= Timeline of the COVID-19 pandemic in Kerala =

The following is the timeline of the COVID-19 pandemic in Kerala from 30 January to 1 December 2020. The timeline is accompanied by a list of confirmed COVID-19 deaths in Kerala until 6 August 2020

== Timeline of reported COVID-19 cases, recoveries and deaths ==
January–February	30 January, 2–3 February	3 Cases: The first positive cases of coronavirus in India were reported from three students of Kerala origin, travelling from the Wuhan province of China, which was the point of origin of the disease. They belonged to Thrissur, Alappuzha and Kasargod districts of Kerala and two of them were medical students at a university in Wuhan. Following the detection of positive cases, the government of Kerala declared a 'state calamity warning'. Over 3000 contacts of the affected individuals were placed under quarantine, out of which 45 were placed in hospital quarantine. The three positive individuals later recovered from the infection following hospital care. The 'state calamity' warning was withdrawn after 4 days, when no further cases were reported. As China was a popular country for students from Kerala to pursue medicine, several medical students got stranded in China when the lock-down due to coronavirus was put into effect. Some of them, who were stranded in airports in China were evacuated and flown into Cochin International Airport and quarantined at isolation wards in Kochi Medical College. However, none of them were later tested positive for the disease.	Total cases (3) Recovered (3) Deaths (0)
March	8 March	5 cases : The positive cases were a couple and their 26-year-old son, who had returned to Kerala from Italy. Two more people who had come in contact with the family also tested positive for the disease. They were kept under quarantine in Pathanamthitta General Hospital. The family had evaded health check-ups and had visited several other places during the one week they had spent in Kerala. Following this, the government issued a 'high alert'.	Total cases (238) Recovered (21) Deaths (2)
March	9 March	1 case : A 3-year-old child, who had returned with his parents from Italy tested positive. The parents and the child were shifted to the isolation ward at Ernakulam Medical College.	Total cases (238) Recovered (21) Deaths (2)
March	10 March	8 cases : Six individuals who were in contact with the family who had returned from Italy were confirmed to have the coronavirus infection. Four of the new cases were admitted at Kottayam and in Kozhencherry. The infected individuals were the grandparents of the affected couple, two from a family they had visited in Ranni and two relatives who picked the couple up from the airport. Later, the parents of the 3-year-old infected child, who were put in isolation in Ernakulam Medical College tested positive, taking the total number of cases in Kerala to 17.	Total cases (238) Recovered (21) Deaths (2)
March	12 March	2 cases : It was confirmed that two persons with travel history from Middle East tested positive for the virus. One, who is from Kannur, had a travel history to Dubai and the other, from Thrissur, had traveled from Qatar. On 13 March 3 people tested positive 1 Italian in Varkala and 2 persons in Trivandrum. No new cases reported on March 14.`	Total cases (238) Recovered (21) Deaths (2)
March	13 March	3 cases : Three more persons, a Keralite who returned from Dubai on Thursday after visiting many countries, including Italy; a tourist from Italy who was under observation at a private resort at Papanasam in Varkala in Thiruvananthapuram; and a Keralite who returned from United Kingdom were tested positive.	Total cases (238) Recovered (21) Deaths (2)
March	15 March	2 cases : A foreigner from Britain who was staying in Munnar, and another a doctor in Trivandrum who had returned from Spain. On 16 March, 3 more cases were confirmed by the Chief Minister of Kerala. One in Kasargod who had visited Dubai and two cases in Malappuram who went to Saudi Arabia bringing the total number of cases to 24.	Total cases (238) Recovered (21) Deaths (2)
March	16 March	3 cases : Three cases have tested positive; one in Kasaragod and two in Malappuram. All the three are said to be Gulf returnees.	Total cases (238) Recovered (21) Deaths (2)
March	19 March	1 case : A person from Kasargod who returned from Dubai.	Total cases (238) Recovered (21) Deaths (2)
March	20 March	12 cases : 5 in Ernakulam, 6 in Kasargod and 1 in Palakkad, bringing the total cases to 40 in Kerala.	Total cases (238) Recovered (21) Deaths (2)
March	21 March	12 cases : 6 in Kasaragod, 3 each in Kannur and Ernakulam districts. All of them returned from Gulf countries.	Total cases (238) Recovered (21) Deaths (2)
March	22 March	15 cases : 5 in Kasargod, 4 in Kannur, 2 each in Malappuram, Ernakulam and Kozhikode.	Total cases (238) Recovered (21) Deaths (2)
March	23 March	28 cases : 19 in Kasargod, 5 in Kannur, 2 in Ernakulam, 1 each in Thrissur and 1 Pathanamthitta. Out of 28, 25 active cases has a travel history from Dubai and rest being person-to-person transmission. Total reported cases were 95 of which 4 were recovered.	Total cases (238) Recovered (21) Deaths (2)
March	24 March	14 cases : 6 in Kasargod, 2 in Kozhikode and 1 each in Alappuzha, Ernakulam, Kottayam, Malappuram, Palakkad and Thiruvananthapuram districts. 8 of the reported cases returned from has a travel history from Dubai and 2 from Qatar and United Kingdom. 1 among 14 is a medical staff who interacted with positive reported patient.	Total cases (238) Recovered (21) Deaths (2)
March	25 March	9 cases : 3 in Ernakulam, 2 each in Palakkad and Pathanamthitta, 1 each in Idukki and Kozhikode according to CM of Kerala.	Total cases (238) Recovered (21) Deaths (2)
March	26 March	19 cases : Wayanad reported its first case along with 9 in Kannur, 3 each in Kasargod and Malappuram, 2 in Thrissur, 1 in Idukki. Five persons who were treatment under Ernakulam will be discharged today. Therefore, as of now there are 126 positives under treatment.	Total cases (238) Recovered (21) Deaths (2)
March	27 March	39 cases : Kollam reported its first case along with 34 in Kasargod, 2 in Kannur, 1 each in Thrissur and Kozhikode. This became the most number of positive cases reported in Kerala on a single day till now.	Total cases (238) Recovered (21) Deaths (2)
March	28 March	6 cases, 1 death : A 69-year-old male from Pallikkal Bazar, Mattancherry, Ernakulam who had a travel history from the Middle East reported to be the first death in Kerala. New cases are 2 from Thiruvananthapuram, 1 each in Kasargod, Malappuram, Palakkad and Kollam.	Total cases (238) Recovered (21) Deaths (2)
March	29 March	20 cases : 8 in Kannur, 7 in and Kasaragod, 1 each in Thiruvananthapuram, Ernakulam, Thrissur, Palakkad and Malappuram. Out of 20, 18 active cases has a travel history from Dubai and rest being person-to-person transmission.4 patients were discharged at Pathanamthitta.	Total cases (238) Recovered (21) Deaths (2)
March	30 March	32 cases : 15 in Kasaragod, 11 in Kannur, 2 each in Idukki and Wayanad. Out of 32, 17 active cases has a travel history and rest being person-to-person transmission.	Total cases (238) Recovered (21) Deaths (2)
March	31 March	7 cases, 1 death : A 68-year-old male from Thiruvananthapuram reported to be the second death in Kerala. New cases are 2 each in Kasaragod and Thiruvananthapuram and 1 each in Kollam, Thrissur and Kannur.	Total cases (238) Recovered (21) Deaths (2)
April	1 April	24 cases : 12 in Kasargod, 3 in Ernakulam, 2 each in Thiruvananthapuram, Thrissur, Malappuram, Kannur, 1 in Palakkad.	Total cases (256) Recovered (359) Deaths (1)
April	2 April	21 cases : 8 in Kasargod, 5 in Idukki 2 in Kollam, and 1 each in Thiruvananthapuram, Pathanamthitta, Thrissur, Malappuram, Kozhikode Kannur.	Total cases (256) Recovered (359) Deaths (1)
April	3 April	9 cases : 7 in Kasargod and 1 each in Thrissur, Kannur.	Total cases (256) Recovered (359) Deaths (1)
April	4 April	11 cases : 6 in Kasargod and 1 each in Alappuzha, Ernakulam, Kannur, Kollam and Palakkad.	Total cases (256) Recovered (359) Deaths (1)
April	5 April	8 cases : 5 in Kozhikode and 1 each in Kannur, Kasargod and Pathanamthitta.	Total cases (256) Recovered (359) Deaths (1)
April	6 April	13 cases : 9 in Kasargod, 2 in Malappuram and 1 each in Kollam, Pathanamthitta.	Total cases (256) Recovered (359) Deaths (1)
April	7 April	9 cases : 4 in Kasargod, 3 in Kannur and 1 each in Kollam, Malappuram.	Total cases (256) Recovered (359) Deaths (1)
April	8 April	9 cases : 4 in Kannur, 2 in Alappuzha and 1 each in Pathanamthitta, Kasargod, and Thrissur.	Total cases (256) Recovered (359) Deaths (1)
April	9 April	12 cases : 4 in Kasaragod, 4 in Kannur, 2 in Malappuram and 1 each in Kollam and Thiruvananthapuram.	Total cases (256) Recovered (359) Deaths (1)
April	10 April	8 cases : 3 in Kasaragod, 3 in Kannur and 2 in Malappuram.	Total cases (256) Recovered (359) Deaths (1)
April	11 April	10 cases : 7 from Kannur, 2 in Kasargod and 1 in Kozhikode.	Total cases (256) Recovered (359) Deaths (1)
April	12 April	2 cases : 1 each in Kannur and Pathanamthitta.	Total cases (256) Recovered (359) Deaths (1)
April	13 April	3 cases : 2 in Kannur and 1 in Palakkad.	Total cases (256) Recovered (359) Deaths (1)
April	14 April	8 cases : 4 in Kannur, 3 in Kozhikode and 1 in Kasargod.	Total cases (256) Recovered (359) Deaths (1)
April	15 April	1 case : in Kannur.	Total cases (256) Recovered (359) Deaths (1)
April	16 April	7 cases : 4 in Kannur, 2 in Kozhikode and 1 in Kasargod.	Total cases (256) Recovered (359) Deaths (1)
April	17 April	1 case : 1 in Kozhikode.	Total cases (256) Recovered (359) Deaths (1)
April	18 April	4 cases : 3 in Kannur and 1 in Kozhikode.	Total cases (256) Recovered (359) Deaths (1)
April	19 April	2 cases : 1 in Kannur and 1 in Kasaragod.	Total cases (256) Recovered (359) Deaths (1)
April	20 April	6 cases : All in Kannur.	Total cases (256) Recovered (359) Deaths (1)
April	21 April	19 cases : 10 in Kannur, 4 in Palakkad, 3 in Kasargod, 1 each in Kollam and Malappuram (1).	Total cases (256) Recovered (359) Deaths (1)
April	22 April	11 cases : 7 in Kannur, 2 in Kozhikode, 1 each in Kottayam and Malappuram.	Total cases (256) Recovered (359) Deaths (1)
April	23 April	10 cases : 4 in Idukki, 2 in Kozhikode, 2 in Kottayam, 1 each in Kollam and Thiruvananthapuram.	Total cases (256) Recovered (359) Deaths (1)
April	24 April	3 cases, 1 death : A 4-month-old baby girl from Manjeri died at Government Medical College, Kozhikode due to COVID-19 reporting the third and the youngest patients death in the state. All positive cases in Kasargod.	Total cases (256) Recovered (359) Deaths (1)
April	25 April	7 cases : 3 each in Kottayam, Kollam and 1 in Kannur.	Total cases (256) Recovered (359) Deaths (1)
April	26 April	11 cases : 6 in Idukki and 5 in Kottayam.	Total cases (256) Recovered (359) Deaths (1)
April	27 April	13 cases : 4 in Idukki, 6 in Kottayam, 1 each in Kannur, Malappuram and Palakkad.	Total cases (256) Recovered (359) Deaths (1)
April	28 April	4 cases : 3 in Kannur and 1 in Kasargod.	Total cases (256) Recovered (359) Deaths (1)
April	29 April	10 cases : 6 in Kollam, 2 each in Thiruvananthapuram and Kasargod. Out of 6 in Kollam, 5 were infected through person-to-person transmission and rest the one is a traveler came from Andhra Pradesh. In Kasargod, both 2 were infected through person-to-person transmission and one among them is a journalist.	Total cases (256) Recovered (359) Deaths (1)
April	30 April	2 cases : 1 in Malappuram and 1 in Kasargod.	Total cases (256) Recovered (359) Deaths (1)
May	2 May	2 cases : 1 in Wayanad and 1 in Kannur.	Total cases (772) Recovered (207) Deaths (6)
May	5 May	3 cases : All in Wayanad.	Total cases (772) Recovered (207) Deaths (6)
May	8 May	1 case : A person in Ernakulam.	Total cases (772) Recovered (207) Deaths (6)
May	9 May	2 cases : 2 Malappuram native repatriated Expats.	Total cases (772) Recovered (207) Deaths (6)
May	10 May	7 cases : 3 in Wayanad, 2 in Thrissur and 1 each in Ernakulam and Malappuram.	Total cases (772) Recovered (207) Deaths (6)
May	11 May	7 cases : 4 in Kasargod, and 1 each in Palakkad, Wayanad and Malappuram.	Total cases (772) Recovered (207) Deaths (6)
May	12 May	5 cases : 3 in Malappuram, and 1 each in Kottayam and Pathanamthitta.	Total cases (772) Recovered (207) Deaths (6)
May	13 May	10 cases : 3 in Malappuram, 2 each in Palakkad and Wayanad and 1 each in Kannur, Kottayam and Kozhikode.	Total cases (772) Recovered (207) Deaths (6)
May	14 May	26 cases : 10 in Kasargod, 5 in Malappuram, 3 each in Palakkad and Wayanad, 2 in Kannur and 1 each in Pathanamthitta, Idukki and Kozhikode.	Total cases (772) Recovered (207) Deaths (6)
May	15 May	16 cases : 5 in Wayanad, 4 in Malappuram, 2 each in Alappuzha and Kozhikode and 1 each in Kasargod, Kollam and Palakkad.	Total cases (772) Recovered (207) Deaths (6)
May	16 May	11 cases : 4 in Thrissur, 3 in Kozhikode and 2 each in Palakkad and Malappuram.	Total cases (772) Recovered (207) Deaths (6)
May	17 May	14 cases : 4 each in Kozhikode and Malappuram, 2 each in Palakkad and Kannur and 1 each in Ernakulam, Kasargod, Kollam and Thrissur.	Total cases (772) Recovered (207) Deaths (6)
May	18 May	29 cases : 6 in Kollam, 4 in Thrissur, 3 each in Thiruvananthapuram and Kannur, 2 each in Pathanamthitta, Alappuzha, Kottayam, Kozhikode and Kasargod and 1 each in Ernakulam, Palakkad and Malappuram.	Total cases (772) Recovered (207) Deaths (6)
May	19 May	12 cases : 5 in Kannur, 3 in Malappuram and 1 each in Alappuzha, Palakkad, Pathanamthitta and Thrissur.	Total cases (772) Recovered (207) Deaths (6)
May	20 May	24 cases : 7 in Palakkad, 4 in Malappuram, 3 in Kannur, 2 each in Pathanamthitta, Thiruvananthapuram and Thrissur and 1 each in Ernakulam, Alappuzha, Kasargod and Kozhikode.	Total cases (772) Recovered (207) Deaths (6)
May	21 May	24 cases : 5 in Malappuram, 4 in Kannur, 3 each in Kottayam and Thrissur, 2 each in Alappuzha, Thiruvananthapuram and Kollam and 1 each in Idukki, Kasargod and Palakkad.	Total cases (772) Recovered (207) Deaths (6)
May	22 May	42 cases, 1 death : A lady from Thrissur, who died in Thrissur on the way from Mumbai to Kerala tested positive. She is reported to be the fourth death in Kerala. New cases are 12 in Kannur, 7 in Kasargod, 5 each in Palakkad and Kozhikode, 4 each in Thrissur and Malappuram, 2 in Kottayam and 1 each in Kollam, Pathanamthitta and Wayanad.	Total cases (772) Recovered (207) Deaths (6)
May	23 May	62 cases : 19 in Palakkad, 16 in Kannur, 8 in Malappuram, 5 in Alappuzha, 4 each in Kozhikode and Kasargod, 3 in Kollam, 2 in Kottayam and 1 in Wayanad.	Total cases (772) Recovered (207) Deaths (6)
May	24 May	53 cases, 1 death : A COVID-19 patient under treatment in Kozhikode (Wayanad Native), who returned to Kerala on 20 May died this day. She was a cancer patient on treatment. She is reported to be the fifth death in Kerala. New cases are 12 each in Kannur and Thiruvananthapuram, 5 each in Malappuram and Kasargod, 4 each in Alappuzha, Ernakulam and Palakkad, 3 in Kollam, 2 in Pathanamthitta and 1 each in Kozhikode and Tamil Nadu.	Total cases (772) Recovered (207) Deaths (6)
May	25 May	49 cases : 14 in Kasargod, 10 in Kannur, 5 each in Palakkad and Thiruvananthapuram, 4 in Kozhikode, 3 each in Alappuzha and Pathanamthitta, 2 each in Kollam and Kottayam and 1 in Idukki.	Total cases (772) Recovered (207) Deaths (6)
May	26 May	67 cases, 1 death : A COVID-19 patient who was also under treatment for neurological disease in Kannur died this day. The source of her infection is unknown. She is reported to be the sixth death in Kerala. New cases are 29 in Palakkad, 8 in Kannur, 6 in Kottayam, 5 each in Ernakulam and Malappuram, 4 each in Kollam and Thrissur and 3 each in Alappuzha and Kasargod.	Total cases (772) Recovered (207) Deaths (6)
May	27 May	40 cases : 10 in Kasargod, 8 in Palakkad, 7 in Alappuzha, 4 in Kollam, 3 each in Pathanamthitta and Wayanad, 2 each in Ernakulam and Kozhikode and 1 in Kannur.	Total cases (772) Recovered (207) Deaths (6)
May	28 May	85 cases and 1 death : A Telangana native died in Thiruvananthapuram. He reached here on 22 May from Jaipur. He is reported to be the seventh death in Kerala. New cases are 18 in Kasargod, 16 in Palakkad, 10 in Kannur, 8 each in Malappuram and Thiruvananthapuram, 7 in Thrissur, 6 each in Kozhikode and Pathanamthitta, 3 in Kottayam, 1 each in Alappuzha, Idukki and Kollam.	Total cases (772) Recovered (207) Deaths (6)
May	29 May	62 cases and 1 death : A COVID-19 patient under treatment in Kottayam (Pathanamthitta native), who came from Dubai on May 11, died this day. New cases are 14 in Palakkad, 8 in Kannur, 6 in Thrissur, 5 each in Malappuram, Pathanamthitta and Thiruvananthapuram, 4 each in Ernakulam and Kasargod, 3 in Alappuzha, 2 each in Kollam, Kozhikode and Wayanad, 1 each in Idukki and Kottayam	Total cases (772) Recovered (207) Deaths (6)
May	30 May	58 cases and 1 death : An Alappuzha native who died today while under treatment for liver disease, tested positive. New cases are 10 in Thrissur, 9 in Palakkad, 8 in Kannur, 4 each in Ernakulam, Kollam, Kozhikode and Idukki, 3 in Kasargod, 2 each in Alappuzha and Thiruvananthapuram, 1 in Kottayam and 7 Air India Cabin Crew.	Total cases (772) Recovered (207) Deaths (6)
May	31 May	61 cases : 12 in Palakkad, 10 in Kasargod, 7 in Kannur, 6 each in Kollam and Alappuzha, 4 each in Thiruvananthapuram and Pathanamthitta, 3 each in Thrissur, Malappuram and Wayanad, 2 each in Kozhikode and Thiruvananthapuram and 1 in Ernakulam.	Total cases (772) Recovered (207) Deaths (6)
June	1 June	57 cases and 1 death : A 56-year-old women in Kozhikode died at Government Medical College, Kozhikode. 14 cases in Kasargod and Malappuram districts each, 9 in Thrissur, 5 in Kollam, 4 in Pathanamthitta, 3 in both Ernakulam and Thiruvananthapuram each, 2 in each Alappuzha and Palakkad, 1 in Idukki and also an Air India Crew member and a primary contact.	Total cases (3173) Recovered (1714) Deaths (15)
June	2 June	86 cases and 1 death : A 65-year-old men native of Kavanad was found dead in his house on 31 May and his COVID-19 test result came positive on 2 June. 15 positive cases in Malappuram, 10 in Alappuzha, 9 in Kasargod, 8 in Kollam, 7 in Thiruvananthapuram, 6 in Kottayam, Thrissur and Wayanad each, 5 in Kannur, Kozhikode and Palakkad each, 3 in Ernakulam and 1 in Pathanamthitta.	Total cases (3173) Recovered (1714) Deaths (15)
June	3 June	82 cases : 14 positive cases in Thiruvananthapuram, 11 in Malappuram, 9 in Idukki, 8 in Kottayam, 7 each in Alappuzha and Kozhikode, 5 each in Ernakulam, Kollam and Palakkad, 4 in Thrissur, 3 in Kasargod, and 2 each in Kannur and Pathanamthitta.	Total cases (3173) Recovered (1714) Deaths (15)
June	4 June	94 cases and 3 deaths : A 73-year-old women who had returned from Chennai via Walayar died at District Hospital, Palakkad. A 77-year-old The priest hailing from Nalanchira died at Government Medical College, Thiruvananthapuram. Another 27-year-old women native to Edappal who had returned from Abu Dhabi on 25 May died at a Private Hospital in Kozhikode. 14 positive cases in Pathanamthitta, 10 in Kozhikode, 8 in Malappuram, 7 in Palakkad, 6 in Kannur, 5 each in Kottayam and Thiruvananthapuram, 4 in Thrissur, 2 in Ernakulam and Wayanad each.	Total cases (3173) Recovered (1714) Deaths (15)
June	5 June	111 cases : Palakkad reported 40 positive cases which is the highest ever daily reporting among all districts to date. Also, 18 cases in Malappuram, 11 in Pathanamthitta, 10 in Ernakulam, 8 in Thrissur, 5 in Alappuzha, 4 in Kozhikode, 3 each in Idukki and Wayanad, 2 in Kollam and 1 each in Kasargod and Kottayam.	Total cases (3173) Recovered (1714) Deaths (15)
June	6 June	108 cases and 1 death : A 61-year-old patient native of Parappanangadi died at the Government Medical College, Manjeri at 6.30 AM on Saturday. 19 positive cases in Kollam, 16 in Thrissur, 12 in Malappuram, 11 in Palakkad, 10 in Kasargod, 9 in Pathanamthitta, 4 in Alappuzha, 3 each in Ernakulam, Idukki and Thiruvananthapuram and 2 in Kottayam.	Total cases (3173) Recovered (1714) Deaths (15)
June	7 June	107 cases and 1 death : An 87-year-old patient hailing from Engandiyur died at Government Medical College, Thrissur. 27 positive cases in Malappuram, 26 in Thrissur, 13 in Pathanamthitta, 9 in Kollam, 7 in Alappuzha, 6 each in Kozhikode and Palakkad, 4 in Thiruvananthapuram, 3 each in Kasargod and Kottayam and 1 each in Idukki and Kannur.	Total cases (3173) Recovered (1714) Deaths (15)
June	8 June	91 cases and 2 deaths : A 42-year-old patient native of Chalakkudy who had arrived from Maldives died at Government Medical College, Thrissur. 27 positive cases in Thrissur, 14 in Malappuram, 13 in Kozhikode, 8 in Kasargod, 5 each in Alappuzha and Kollam, 3 each in Ernakulam, Pathanamthitta, Kottayam and Thiruvananthapuram and 2 in Wayanad.	Total cases (3173) Recovered (1714) Deaths (15)
June	9 June	91 cases : 14 positive cases in Palakkad, 11 in Alappuzha, 10 in Thiruvananthapuram, 8 in Kottayam, 7 each in Kozhikode and Pathanamthitta, 6 each in Malappuram, Thrissur and Wayanad, 5 each in Kannur and Kollam and 2 in Kasargod.	Total cases (3173) Recovered (1714) Deaths (15)
June	10 June	65 cases : 10 positive cases in Kozhikode, 9 in Thrissur, 7 in Malappuram, 6 each in Palakkad and Thiruvananthapuram, 4 each in Ernakulam, Idukki, Kannur and Kollam, 3 each in Kottayam and Pathanamthitta and 1 in Alappuzha.	Total cases (3173) Recovered (1714) Deaths (15)
June	11 June	83 cases and 1 death : A 70-year-old patient native to Iritty, who was under treatment for cancer died while being shifted to Government Medical College, Kannur. 25 Positive cases in Thrissur, 13 in Palakkad, 10 each in Kasargod and Malappuram, 8 in Kollam, 7 in Kannur, 5 in Pathanamthitta, 2 each in Ernakulam and Kottayam and 1 in Kozhikode.	Total cases (3173) Recovered (1714) Deaths (15)
June	12 June	78 cases and 1 death : The 78-year-old patient who died on Thursday night had COVID-19 after his test result turned out to be positive on 13 June. 14 positive cases each in Malappuram and Thrissur, 13 in Alappuzha, 7 in Pathanamthitta, 5 in Ernakulam, 4 each in Kasargod, Kollam and Kozhikode, 3 each in Kannur and Kottayam and 1 each in Idukki and Thiruvananthapuram.	Total cases (3173) Recovered (1714) Deaths (15)
June	13 June	85 cases : 15 positive cases in Malappuram, 14 in Kannur, 12 in Kozhikode, 9 each in Alappuzha and Kasargod, 8 in Palakkad, 7 in Ernakulam, 4 each in Idukki and Thrissur, 1 each in Kottayam and Wayanad.	Total cases (3173) Recovered (1714) Deaths (15)
June	14 June	54 cases : 8 Positive cases in Kozhikode, 7 each in Ernakulam and Thrissur, 6 each in Kasargod and Palakkad, 4 each in Kannur and Thiruvananthapuram, 2 each in Idukki, Kottayam, Malappuram and Pathanamthitta and 1 each in Kollam and Wayanad.	Total cases (3173) Recovered (1714) Deaths (15)
June	15 June	82 cases and 1 death : A 67-year old heart patient died on 12 June and his COVID-19 test result came positive on 15 June. 13 Positive cases in Ernakulam, 11 in Pathanamthitta, 10 each in Kannur and Kottayam, 7 in Palakkad, 6 each in Kozhikode and Malappuram, 5 in Alappuzha, 4 in Kollam, 3 each in Kasargod and Thrissur, 2 in Idukki and 1 each in Thiruvananthapuram and Wayanad.	Total cases (3173) Recovered (1714) Deaths (15)
June	16 June	79 cases : 15 positive cases in Malappuram, 13 in Ernakulam, 7 each in Alappuzha, Kannur and Thrissur, 6 each in Kozhikode, Palakkad and Pathanamthitta, 4 each in Kollam, Kottayam and Thiruvananthapuram and 2 in Kasargod.	Total cases (3173) Recovered (1714) Deaths (15)
June	17 June	75 cases : 14 positive cases in Kollam, 11 in Malappuram, 9 in Kasargod, 8 in Thrissur, 6 each in Kozhikode and Palakkad, 5 in Ernakulam, 4 each in Kannur and Kottayam, 3 each in Thiruvananthapuram and Wayanad and 1 each in Alappuzha and Pathanamthitta.	Total cases (3173) Recovered (1714) Deaths (15)
June	18 June	97 cases and 1 death : A 28-year-old driver of Excise Department of Kerala died at Government Medical College, Kannur. 14 positive cases in Palakkad, 13 in Kollam, 11 each in Kottayam and Pathanamthitta, 9 in Alappuzha, 6 each in Ernakulam, Idukki and Thrissur, 5 each in Kozhikode and Thiruvananthapuram and 4 each in Kannur and Malappuram.	Total cases (3173) Recovered (1714) Deaths (15)
June	19 June	118 cases : 18 positive cases in Malappuram, 17 in Kollam, 13 in Alappuzha, 11 in Ernakulam, 10 in Palakkad, 9 in Pathanamthitta, 8 each in Kannur and Thiruvananthapuram, 7 in Kottayam, 6 in Kozhikode, 4 each in Wayanad and Kasargod, 2 in Idukki and 1 in Thrissur.	Total cases (3173) Recovered (1714) Deaths (15)
June	20 June	127 cases : 24 positive cases in Kollam, 23 in Palakkad, 17 in Pathanamthitta, 12 in Kozhikode, 11 in Kottayam, 7 in Kasargod, 6 in Thrissur, 5 each in Malappuram, Thiruvananthapuram and Wayanad, 4 each in Alappuzha and Kannur, 3 in Ernakulam and 1 in Idukki.	Total cases (3173) Recovered (1714) Deaths (15)
June	21 June	133 cases : 16 positive cases in Thrissur, 15 in Palakkad, 11 in Idukki, 10 each in Alappuzha, Kannur, Kottayam, Kozhikode and Malappuram, 9 in Thiruvananthapuram, 8 in Pathanamthitta, 6 in Kasargod and 5 in Ernakulam.	Total cases (3173) Recovered (1714) Deaths (15)
June	22 June	138 cases : 17 positive cases in Malappuram, 16 in Palakkad, 14 in Ernakulam, 13 each in Kollam and Kottayam, 12 each in Alappuzha and Thrissur, 11 in Thiruvananthapuram, 9 in Kasargod, 5 each in Kozhikode and Wayanad, 4 each in Idukki and Pathanamthitta and 3 in Kannur.	Total cases (3173) Recovered (1714) Deaths (15)
June	23 June	141 cases : 27 positive cases in Pathanamthitta, 27 in Palakkad, 19 in Alappuzha, 14 in Thrissur, 13 in Ernakulam, 11 in Malappuram, 8 in Kottayam, 6 each in Kannur and Kozhikode, 4 each in Kollam, 2 each in Idukki and Wayanad.	Total cases (3173) Recovered (1714) Deaths (15)
June	24 June	152 cases : 25 positive cases in Pathanamthitta, 18 in Kollam, 17 in Kannur, 16 in Palakkad, 15 each in Alappuzha and Thrissur, 10 in Malappuram, 8 in Ernakulam, 7 in Kottayam, 6 each in Idukki and Kasargod, 4 in Thiruvananthapuram, 3 in Kozhikode and 2 in Wayanad.	Total cases (3173) Recovered (1714) Deaths (15)
June	25 June	123 cases : 24 positive cases in Palakkad, 18 in Alappuzha, 13 each in Kollam and Pathanamthitta, 10 in Ernakulam, 9 each in Kannur and Thrissur, 7 in Kozhikode, 6 in Malappuram, 4 in Kasargod, 3 in Idukki and 2 each in Kottayam, Thiruvananthapuram and Wayanad.	Total cases (3173) Recovered (1714) Deaths (15)
June	26 June	150 cases : 23 positive cases in Palakkad, 21 in Alappuzha, 18 in Kottayam, 16 each in Kollam and Malappuram, 13 in Kannur, 9 in Ernakulam, 7 each in Kozhikode, Thiruvananthapuram and Thrissur, 4 in Pathanamthitta, 5 in Wayanad and 2 each in Idukki and Kasargod.	Total cases (3173) Recovered (1714) Deaths (15)
June	27 June	195 cases : 47 positive cases in Malappuram, 25 in Palakkad, 22 in Thrissur, 15 in Kottayam, 14 in Ernakulam, 13 in Alappuzha, 12 in Kollam, 11 each in Kannur and Kasargod, 8 in Kozhikode, 6 in Pathanamthitta, 5 in Wayanad, 4 in Thiruvananthapuram and 2 in Idukki.	Total cases (3173) Recovered (1714) Deaths (15)
June	28 June	118 cases : 26 positive cases in Kannur, 17 in Thrissur, 10 each in Alappuzha and Kollam, 9 in Thiruvananthapuram, 7 each in Ernakulam and Kozhikode, 6 in Kasargod, 5 each in Kottayam, Malappuram and Wayanad, 4 each in Idukki and Palakkad and 3 in Pathanamthitta.	Total cases (3173) Recovered (1714) Deaths (15)
June	29 June	118 cases and 1 death : The COVID-19 test results of a patient native to Tamil Nadu who died at Government Medical College, Manjeri on 24 June came positive on 29 June. The positive cases include 26 in Thrissur, 14 in Kannur, 13 each in Malappuram and Pathanamthitta, 12 in Palakkad, 9 in Kozhikode, 8 in Kottayam, 5 each in Alappuzha, Ernakulam and Idukki, 4 each in Kasargod and Thiruvananthapuram and 2 in Wayanad.	Total cases (3173) Recovered (1714) Deaths (15)
June	30 June	131 cases and 1 death : The COVID-19 test result of Thiruvananthapuram native Thankappan (76) who died on June 27, came out positive. The positive cases include 32 in Malappuram, 26 in Kannur, 17 in Palakkad, 12 in Kollam, 10 in Ernakulam, 9 in Alappuzha, 8 in Kasargod, 4 each in Kozhikode and Thrissur and 1 in Pathanamthitta.	Total cases (3173) Recovered (1714) Deaths (15)
July	1 July	151 cases and 1 death : A Man in Kozhikode who hanged himself to death at his home in Vellayil tested positive post his death for the second time. Positive cases include 34 in Malappuram, 27 in Kannur, 18 in Thrissur, 17 in Palakkad, 12 in Ernakulam, 10 in Kasargod, 8 in Alappuzha, 6 each in Kozhikode and Pathanamthitta, 4 each in Kottayam and Thiruvananthapuram, 3 each in Kollam and Wayanad and 1 in Idukki.	Total cases (19171) Recovered (10689) Deaths (49)
July	2 July	160 cases : 27 in Pathanamthitta, 24 in Malappuram, 18 in Palakkad, 16 in Alappuzha, 9 each in Ernakulam, Kannur, Kollam, Kottayam, Thiruvananthapuram and Thrissur, 8 in Idukki, 7 in Kozhikode, 5 in Kasargod and 1 in Wayanad.	Total cases (19171) Recovered (10689) Deaths (49)
July	3 July	211 cases : 35 in Malappuram, 23 in Kollam, 21 each in Alappuzha and Thrissur, 18 in Kannur, 17 each in Ernakulam and Thiruvananthapuram, 14 each in Kottayam, Kozhikode and Palakkad, 7 each in Kasargod and Pathanamthitta, 2 in Idukki and 1 in Wayanad.	Total cases (19171) Recovered (10689) Deaths (49)
July	4 July	240 cases : 37 cases in Malappuram, 35 in Kannur, 29 in Palakkad, 22 in Pathanamthitta, 20 each in Alappuzha and Thrissur, 16 each in Kollam and Thiruvananthapuram, 14 in Kasargod, 13 in Ernakulam, 8 in Kozhikode, 6 in Kottayam and 2 each in Idukki and Wayanad.	Total cases (19171) Recovered (10689) Deaths (49)
July	5 July	225 cases : 29 in Palakkad, 28 in Kasargod, 27 in Thiruvananthapuram, 26 in Malappuram, 25 in Kannur, 20 in Kozhikode, 13 in Alappuzha, 12 each in Ernakulam and Thrissur, 10 in Kollam, 8 in Kottayam, 6 each in Idukki and Wayanad and 3 in Pathanamthitta.	Total cases (19171) Recovered (10689) Deaths (49)
July	6 July	193 cases and 2 deaths : An 82-year-old patient native to Chokkad, Malappuram who came from Riyadh on 29 June died at Government Medical College, Manjeri. And, a patient native to Thoppumpady who was under treatment at Government Medical College, Ernakulam since 28 June died on 5 July. He was undergoing treatment for diabetes for a long time and was admitted to the hospital after he was diagnosed with COVID-19 and had contracted pneumonia in his lungs. Positive cases include 35 in Malappuram, 26 in Pathanamthitta, 25 in Ernakulam, 15 each in Alappuzha and Kozhikode1, 14 in Thrissur, 11 each in Kannur and Kollam, 8 each in Palakkad and Wayanad, 7 in Thiruvananthapuram and 6 each in Idukki, Kasargod and Kottayam.	Total cases (19171) Recovered (10689) Deaths (49)
July	7 July	272 cases : 63 in Malappuram, 54 in Thiruvananthapuram, 29 in Palakkad, 21 in Ernakulam, 19 in Kannur, 18 in Alappuzha, 15 in Kozhikode, 13 in Kasargod, 12 in Pathanamthitta, 11 in Kollam, 10 in Thrissur, 3 each in Kottayam and Wayanad and 1 in Idukki.	Total cases (19171) Recovered (10689) Deaths (49)
July	8 July	301 cases : 64 in Thiruvananthapuram, 46 in Malappuram, 25 each in Palakkad and Thrissur, 22 in Kannur, 20 in Idukki, 18 in Alappuzha, 17 in Kottayam, 16 in Ernakulam, 15 in Kozhikode, 14 in Wayanad, 8 in Kollam, 7 in Pathanamthitta and 4 in Kasargod.	Total cases (19171) Recovered (10689) Deaths (49)
July	9 July	339 cases : 95 in Thiruvananthapuram, 55 in Malappuram, 50 each in Palakkad, 27 in Thrissur, 22 in Alappuzha, 20 in Idukki, 12 in Ernakulam, 11 in Kasargod, 10 in Kollam, 8 each in Kozhikode and Kannur, 7 each in Kottayam, Pathanamthitta and Wayanad.	Total cases (19171) Recovered (10689) Deaths (49)
July	10 July	416 cases : 129 in Thiruvananthapuram, 50 in Alappuzha, 41 in Malappuram, 32 in Pathanamthitta, 28 each in Kollam and Palakkad, 23 in Kannur, 20 in Ernakulam, 17 each in Kasargod and Thrissur, 12 each in Idukki and Kozhikode and 7 each in Kottayam and Wayanad.	Total cases (19171) Recovered (10689) Deaths (49)
July	11 July	488 cases and 2 deaths : A patient native to Manikyapuram died at Government Medical College, Thiruvananthapuram on 10 July. Health officials believe that he might have contracted the virus from any of his infected customers who came in contact with him. Also, A patient native to Pulluvazhy, who died on 10 July night, turned positive on 11 July. He had been admitted to Malankara Orthodox Syrian Church Medical College, Kolenchery on Friday morning with high fever. Positive cases include 87 in Alappuzha, 69 in Thiruvananthapuram, 54 in Pathanamthitta, 51 in Malappuram, 48 in Palakkad, 47 in Ernakulam, 29 in Thrissur, 19 in Kannur, 18 in Kasargod and Kollam, 17 in Kozhikode, 15 in Kottayam, 11 in Wayanad and 5 in Idukki.	Total cases (19171) Recovered (10689) Deaths (49)
July	12 July	435 cases and 2 deaths : A 63-year-old women native of Arimpur who died on 5 July was confirmed COVID-19 positive on 12 July. Positive cases include 59 in Palakkad, 57 in Alappuzha, 56 in Kasargod, 50 in Ernakulam, 42 in Malappuram, 40 in Thiruvananthapuram, 39 in Pathanamthitta, 19 each in Thrissur and Wayanad, 17 in Kannur, 16 in Idukki, 12 in Kottayam, 5 in Kollam and 4 in Kozhikode.	Total cases (19171) Recovered (10689) Deaths (49)
July	13 July	449 cases and 2 deaths : A 71-year old auto rickshaw driver died at Government Medical College, Kottayam. Also, a 64-year-old women died at Government Medical College, Kannur while undergoing treatment for Cancer. Positive cases include 119 in Alappuzha, 63 in Thiruvananthapuram, 47 each in Malappuram and Pathanamthitta, 44 in Kannur, 33 in Kollam, 19 in Palakkad, 16 in Kozhikode, 15 in Ernakulam, 14 in Wayanad, 10 in Kottayam, 9 each in Kasargod and Thrissur and 4 in Idukki.	Total cases (19171) Recovered (10689) Deaths (49)
July	14 July	608 cases and 1 death : A 47-year-old patient native to Chunakkara who had arrived from Saudi Arabia on early July died at Government T D Medical College, Alappuzha. Positive cases include 201 in Thiruvananthapuram, 70 in Ernakulam, 58 each in Kozhikode and Malappuram, 44 in Kasargod, 42 in Thrissur, 34 in Alappuzha, 26 in Palakkad, 25 in Kottayam, 23 in Kollam, 12 each in Kannur and Wayanad and 3 in Pathanamthitta.	Total cases (19171) Recovered (10689) Deaths (49)
July	15 July	623 cases and 1 death : A 54-year-old women native to Idukki, who died of heart attack on 12 July had been tested positive for the virus post her death on 15 July. Positive cases include 157 in Thiruvananthapuram, 74 in Kasargod, 72 in Ernakulam, 64 each in Kozhikode and Pathanamthitta, 54 in Idukki, 35 in Kannur, 25 in Kottayam, 20 in Alappuzha, 19 in Palakkad, 18 in Malappuram, 11 in Kollam, 5 in Thrissur and 4 in Wayanad.	Total cases (19171) Recovered (10689) Deaths (49)
July	16 July	722 cases and 2 deaths : A 24-year-old patient native to Kariyad had arrived to the state from Ahmedabad, Gujarat on late June died while undergoing his quarantine protocol periods. Also, a 38-year-old patient native to Guruvayur who had arrived from Chennai on 25 June died at Government Medical College, Thrissur. Positive cases include 339 in Thiruvananthapuram, 57 in Ernakulam, 42 each in Kollam and Malappuram, 39 in Pathanamthitta, 33 in Kozhikode, 32 in Thrissur, 26 in Idukki, 25 in Palakkad, 23 in Kannur, 20 in Alappuzha, 18 in Kasargod and 13 each in Kottayam and Wayanad.	Total cases (19171) Recovered (10689) Deaths (49)
July	17 July	791 cases and 1 death : A 45-year-old man who died on 15 July tested positive for COVID-19. He was admitted to Thrissur Medical College due to fever and shortness of breath. Positive cases include 246 in Thiruvananthapuram, 115 in Ernakulam, 87 in Pathanamthitta, 57 in Alappuzha, 47 in Kollam, 39 in Kottayam, 32 each in Kasargod, Kozhikode and Thrissur, 31 in Palakkad, 28 in Wayanad, 25 in Malappuram, 11 in Idukki and 9 in Kannur.	Total cases (19171) Recovered (10689) Deaths (49)
July	18 July	583 cases and 2 deaths : 2 patients of 70 and 60-years old native to Thiruvananthapuram, died on 11 and 16 July respectively, tested positive for the virus on 18 July. Positive cases include 173 in Thiruvananthapuram, 53 in Kollam, 49 in Palakkad, 44 in Ernakulam, 42 in Alappuzha, 39 in Kannur, 29 in Kasargod, 28 each in Idukki and Pathanamthitta, 26 each in Kozhikode and Wayanad, 21 in Thrissur, 19 in Malappuram and 16 in Kottayam.	Total cases (19171) Recovered (10689) Deaths (49)
July	19 July	821 cases and 2 deaths : A patient native to Uppala, Kasargod died of Covid-triggered complications on 17 July and tested positive for the virus for the second time on 19 July. Also, a patient resident of Veliyathunad in Karumalloor panchayat died at Government Medical College, Ernakulam on 19 July. He was undergoing treatment for COVID-19 at Government Medical College, Ernakulam from 8 July. Positive cases include 222 in Thiruvananthapuram, 98 in Ernakulam, 81 in Palakkad, 75 in Kollam, 61 in Thrissur, 57 in Kasargod, 52 in Alappuzha, 49 in Idukki, 35 in Pathanamthitta, 32 in Kozhikode, 25 in Malappuram, 20 in Kottayam, 13 in Kannur and 1 in Wayanad.	Total cases (19171) Recovered (10689) Deaths (49)
July	20 July	794 cases and 1 death : A 73-year old nun who died on 16 July at SD Convent in Ernakulam tested positive for COVID-19 on 20 July. Positive cases include 182 in Thiruvananthapuram, 92 in Kozhikode, 79 in Kollam, 72 in Ernakulam, 53 in Alappuzha, 50 in Malappuram, 49 in Palakkad, 48 in Kannur, 46 in Kottayam, 42 in Thrissur, 28 in Kasargod, 26 in Wayanad, 24 in Idukki and 3 in Pathanamthitta.	Total cases (19171) Recovered (10689) Deaths (49)
July	21 July	794 cases and 1 death : A 72-year-old patient native to Pulluvila, Thiruvananthapuram, who died on 15 July tested positive for the virus on 21 July. Positive cases include 151 in Thiruvananthapuram, 85 in Kollam, 80 in Ernakulam, 61 in Malappuram, 57 in Kannur, 46 each in Alappuzha and Palakkad, 40 each in Kasargod and Pathanamthitta, 39 each in Kozhikode and Kottayam, 19 in Thrissur and 17 in Wayanad.	Total cases (19171) Recovered (10689) Deaths (49)
July	22 July	1038 cases and 1 death : 226 in Thiruvananthapuram, 133 in Kollam, 120 in Alappuzha, 101 in Kasargod, 92 in Ernakulam, 61 in Malappuram, 56 in Thrissur, 51 in Kottayam, 49 in Pathanamthitta, 43 each in Idukki and Kannur, 34 in Palakkad, 25 in Kozhikode and 4 in Wayanad.	Total cases (19171) Recovered (10689) Deaths (49)
July	23 July	1078 cases and 5 deaths : 222 in Thiruvananthapuram, 106 in Kollam, 100 in Ernakulam, 89 in Malappuram, 83 in Thrissur, 82 in Alappuzha, 80 in Kottayam, 63 in Idukki, 51 in Palakkad, 47 in Kasargod, 27 in Pathanamthitta, 10 in Wayanad, 6 in Kozhikode and 5 in Kannur.	Total cases (19171) Recovered (10689) Deaths (49)
July	24 July	885 cases and 4 deaths : 167 in Thiruvananthapuram, 133 in Kollam, 106 in Kasargod, 82 in Kozhikode, 69 in Ernakulam, 58 each in Malappuram and Palakkad, 50 in Kottayam, 44 in Alappuzha, 33 in Thrissur, 29 in Idukki, 23 in 18 in Pathanamthitta, Kannur and 15 in Wayanad.	Total cases (19171) Recovered (10689) Deaths (49)
July	25 July	1103 cases and 5 deaths : 240 in Thiruvananthapuram, 110 in Kozhikode, 105 in Kasargod, 102 in Alappuzha, 80 in Kollam, 79 in Ernakulam, 77 in Kottayam, 68 in Malappuram, 62 in Kannur, 52 in Pathanamthitta, 40 in Idukki, 36 in Thrissur, 35 in Palakkad, 17 in Wayanad.	Total cases (19171) Recovered (10689) Deaths (49)
July	26 July	927 cases and 2 deaths : 175 in Thiruvananthapuram, 107 in Kasargod, 91 in Pathanamthitta, 74 in Kollam, 61 in Ernakulam, 57 in Kozhikode, 56 in Malappuram, 54 in Kottayam, 48 in Idukki, 47 in Kannur, 46 in Alappuzha, 42 each in Palakkad and Wayanad and 41 in Thrissur.	Total cases (19171) Recovered (10689) Deaths (49)
July	27 July	702 cases and 2 deaths : 161 in Thiruvananthapuram, 86 in Malappuram, 70 in Idukki, 68 in Kozhikode, 59 in Kottayam, 41 in Palakkad, 40 in Thrissur, 38 each in Kannur and Kasargod, 30 in Alappuzha, 22 in Kollam, 17 each in Pathanamthitta and Wayanad and 15 in Ernakulam.	Total cases (19171) Recovered (10689) Deaths (49)
July	28 July	1167 cases and 4 deaths : 227 in Thiruvananthapuram, 118 Kottayam, in 112 in Malappuram, 109 in Thrissur, 95 in Kollam, 86 in Palakkad, 84 in Alappuzha, 70 in Ernakulam, 67 in Kozhikode, 63 in Pathanamthitta, 53 in Wayanad, 43 in Kannur, 38 in Kasargod and 7 in Idukki.	Total cases (19171) Recovered (10689) Deaths (49)
July	29 July	903 cases and 1 death : 213 in Thiruvananthapuram, 87 in Malappuram, 84 in Kollam, 83 in Ernakulam, 67 in Kozhikode, 54 in Pathanamthitta, 49 each in Kasargod and Palakkad, 43 in Wayanad, 42 in Kannur, 38 in Alappuzha, 34 in Idukki, 31 in Thrissur and 29 in Kottayam.	Total cases (19171) Recovered (10689) Deaths (49)
July	30 July	506 cases and 2 deaths : 83 in Thrissur, 70 in Thiruvananthapuram, 59 in Pathanamthitta, 55 in Alappuzha, 42 in Kozhikode, 39 in Kannur, 34 in Ernakulam, 32 in Malappuram, 29 in Kottayam, 28 in Kasargod, 22 in Kollam, 6 in Idukki, 4 in Palakkad and 3 in Wayanad.	Total cases (19171) Recovered (10689) Deaths (49)
July	31 July	1310 cases and 3 deaths : 320 in Thiruvananthapuram, 132 in Ernakulam, 130 in Pathanamthitta, 124 in Wayanad, 89 in Kottayam, 84 in Kozhikode, 83 in Palakkad, 73 in Malappuram, 60 in Thrissur, 59 in Idukki, 53 in Kollam, 52 in Kasargod, 35 in Alappuzha and 14 in Kannur.	Total cases (19171) Recovered (10689) Deaths (49)
August	1 August	1129 cases and 8 deaths : 259 in Thiruvananthapuram, 153 in Kasargod, 141 in Malappuram, 95 in Kozhikode, 89 in 85 in Kottayam, Pathanamthitta, 76 in Thrissur, 67 in Alappuzha, 59 in Ernakulam, 47 in Palakkad, 46 in Wayanad, 35 in Kollam, 14 in Idukki and 5 in Kannur.	Total cases (51772) Recovered (38515) Deaths (219)
August	2 August	1169 cases and 1 death : 377 in Thiruvananthapuram, 128 in Ernakulam, 126 in Malappuram, 133 in Kasargod, 70 in Kottayam, 69 in Kollam, 58 in Thrissur, 50 in Kozhikode, 42 in Idukki, 38 each in Alappuzha and Palakkad, 25 in Pathanamthitta, 19 in Wayanad and 16 in Kannur.	Total cases (51772) Recovered (38515) Deaths (219)
August	3 August	962 cases and 2 deaths : 205 in Thiruvananthapuram, 106 in Ernakulam, 101 in Alappuzha, 85 each in Malappuram and Thrissur, 66 in Kasargod, 59 in Palakkad, 57 in Kollam, 37 in Kannur, 36 in Pathanamthitta, 35 in Kottayam, 33 in Kozhikode, 31 in Wayanad and 26 in Idukki.	Total cases (51772) Recovered (38515) Deaths (219)
August	4 August	1083 cases and 3 deaths : 242 in Thiruvananthapuram, 135 in Ernakulam, 131 in Malappuram, 126 each in Alappuzha, 97 in Kozhikode, 91 in Kasargod, 72 in Thrissur, 50 in Palakkad, 37 in Kannur, 32 in Pathanamthitta, 30 in Kollam, 23 in Kottayam and 17 in Wayanad.	Total cases (51772) Recovered (38515) Deaths (219)
August	5 August	1195 cases and 7 deaths : 274 in Thiruvananthapuram, 167 in Malappuram, 128 in Kasargod, 120 in Ernakulam, 108 in Alappuzha, 86 in Thrissur, 61 in Kannur, 51 in Kottayam 41 in Palakkad, 39 each in Idukki and Kozhikode, 37 in Pathanamthitta, 30 in Kollam, 14 in Wayanad.	Total cases (51772) Recovered (38515) Deaths (219)
August	6 August	1298 cases and 3 deaths : 219 in Thiruvananthapuram, 174 in Kozhikode, 153 in Kasargod, 136 in Palakkad, 129 in Malappuram, 99 in Alappuzha, 74 in Thrissur, 73 in Ernakulam, 58 in Idukki, 46 in Wayanad, 40 in Kottayam, 33 in each in Kannur and Pathanamthitta, 31 in Kollam.	Total cases (51772) Recovered (38515) Deaths (219)
August	7 August	1251 cases and 5 deaths : 289 in Thiruvananthapuram, 168 in Kasargod, 149 in Kozhikode, 143 in Malappuram, 123 in Palakkad, 82 in Ernakulam, 61 in Alappuzha, 55 in Wayanad, 39 in Pathanamthitta, 37 in Kottayam, 36 in Kollam, 33 in Thrissur, 23 in Idukki and 13 in Kannur.	Total cases (51772) Recovered (38515) Deaths (219)
August	8 August	1420 cases and 4 deaths : 485 in Thiruvananthapuram, 173 in Kozhikode, 169 in Alappuzha, 114 in Malappuram, 101 in Ernakulam, 73 in Kasargod, 64 in Thrissur, 57 in Kannur, 41 each in Idukki and Kollam, 39 in Palakkad, 38 in Pathanamthitta, 15 in Kottayam and 10 in Wayanad.	Total cases (51772) Recovered (38515) Deaths (219)
August	9 August	1211 cases and 2 deaths : 292 in Thiruvananthapuram, 170 in Malappuram, 139 in Kottayam, 110 in Alappuzha, 106 in Kollam, 78 in Palakkad, 69 in Kozhikode, 56 in Kasargod, 54 in Ernakulam, 41 in Kannur, 30 in Pathanamthitta, 25 in Wayanad, 24 in Thrissur and 17 in Idukki.	Total cases (51772) Recovered (38515) Deaths (219)
August	10 August	1184 cases and 7 deaths : 255 in Malappuram, 200 in Thiruvananthapuram, 147 in Palakkad, 146 in Kasargod, 101 in Ernakulam, 66 in Kozhikode, 63 in Kannur, 41 in Kollam, 40 each in Kottayam and Thrissur, 33 in Wayanad, 30 in Alappuzha, 10 in Idukki and 4 in Pathanamthitta.	Total cases (51772) Recovered (38515) Deaths (219)
August	11 August	1417 cases and 5 deaths : 297 in Thiruvananthapuram, 242 in Malappuram, 158 in Kozhikode, 147 in Kasargod, 146 in Alappuzha, 141 in Palakkad, 133 in Ernakulam, 32 in Thrissur, 30 in Kannur, 25 in Kollam, 24 in Kottayam, 20 in Pathanamthitta, 18 in Wayanad and 4 in Idukki.	Total cases (51772) Recovered (38515) Deaths (219)
August	12 August	1212 cases and 5 deaths : 266 in Thiruvananthapuram, 261 in Malappuram, 121 in Ernakulam, 118 in Alappuzha, 93 in Kozhikode, 81 in Palakkad, 76 in Kottayam, 68 in Kasargod, 42 in Idukki, 31 in Kannur, 19 each in Pathanamthitta and Thrissur, 12 in Wayanad and 5 in Kollam.	Total cases (51772) Recovered (38515) Deaths (219)
August	13 August	1564 cases and 3 deaths : 434 in Thiruvananthapuram, 202 each in Malappuram and Palakkad, 115 in Ernakulam, 98 in Kozhikode, 79 in Kasargod, 75 each in Pathanamthitta and Thrissur, 74 in Kollam, 72 in Alappuzha, 53 in Kottayam, 31 in Idukki, 27 each in Kannur and Wayanad.	Total cases (51772) Recovered (38515) Deaths (219)
August	14 August	1569 cases and 10 deaths : 310 in Thiruvananthapuram, 198 each in Malappuram, 180 in Palakkad, 114 in Ernakulam, 113 in Alappuzha, 101 in Kottayam, 99 in Kozhikode, 95 in Kannur, 80 in Thrissur, 75 in Kollam, 58 in Idukki, 57 in Wayanad, 49 in Kasargod and 40 in Pathanamthitta.	Total cases (51772) Recovered (38515) Deaths (219)
August	15 August	1608 cases and 7 deaths : 362 in Malappuram, 321 in Thiruvananthapuram, 151 in Kozhikode, 118 in Alappuzha, 106 in Ernakulam, 91 in Kollam, 85 in Thrissur, 81 in Kasargod, 74 in Palakkad, 52 in Kannur, 49 in Pathanamthitta, 48 in Wayanad, 39 in Kottayam and 31 in Idukki.	Total cases (51772) Recovered (38515) Deaths (219)
August	16 August	1530 cases and 10 deaths : 519 in Thiruvananthapuram, 221 in Malappuram, 123 in Ernakulam, 118 in Kozhikode, 100 in Kottayam, 86 in Alappuzha, 81 in Kollam, 52 in Kannur, 49 in Wayanad, 48 in Kasargod, 44 in Pathanamthitta, 30 each in Idukki and Thrissur and 29 in Palakkad.	Total cases (51772) Recovered (38515) Deaths (219)
August	17 August	1725 cases and 13 deaths : 461 in Thiruvananthapuram, 306 in Malappuram, 156 in Thrissur, 139 in Alappuzha, 137 in Palakkad, 129 in Ernakulam, 97 in Kasargod, 89 in Kottayam, 77 in Kannur, 48 in Kollam, 46 in Kozhikode, 23 in Idukki, 15 in Wayanad and 2 in Pathanamthitta.	Total cases (51772) Recovered (38515) Deaths (219)
August	18 August	1758 cases and 6 deaths : 489 in Thiruvananthapuram, 242 in Malappuram, 192 in Ernakulam, 147 in Kozhikode, 126 in Alappuzha, 123 in Kannur, 93 in Kottayam, 88 in Kollam, 65 in Pathanamthitta, 51 in Palakkad, 48 in Thrissur, 47 in Wayanad, 42 in Kasargod and 5 in Idukki.	Total cases (51772) Recovered (38515) Deaths (219)
August	19 August	2333 cases and 7 deaths : 540 in Thiruvananthapuram, 322 in Malappuram, 253 Alappuzha, 230 in Ernakulam, 203 in Kottayam, 174 in Kasargod, 126 in Kannur, 97 in Thrissur, 87 in Pathanamthitta, 78 in Kozhikode, 77 in Kollam, 65 in Palakkad, 64 in Idukki and 17 in Wayanad.	Total cases (51772) Recovered (38515) Deaths (219)
August	20 August	1968 cases and 9 deaths : 429 in Thiruvananthapuram, 356 in Malappuram, 198 in Alappuzha, 150 in Ernakulam, 130 in Kozhikode, 124 in Kottayam, 119 in Pathanamthitta, 91 in Kasargod, 86 in Kollam, 78 in Kannur, 72 in Thrissur, 65 in Palakkad, 35 each in Idukki and Wayanad.	Total cases (51772) Recovered (38515) Deaths (219)
August	21 August	1983 cases and 12 deaths : 429 in Thiruvananthapuram, 335 in Malappuram, 165 in Ernakulam, 158 in Kozhikode, 155 in Alappuzha, 136 in Kottayam, 119 in Thrissur, 105 in Kasargod, 83 in Palakkad, 82 in Kollam, 78 each in Kannur and Pathanamthitta, 34 in Idukki and 26 in Wayanad	Total cases (51772) Recovered (38515) Deaths (219)
August	22 August	2172 cases and 15 deaths : 464 in Thiruvananthapuram, 395 in Malappuram, 232 in Kozhikode, 184 in Palakkad, 179 in Thrissur, 119 in Kasargod, 114 in Ernakulam, 104 in Kottayam, 93 in Pathanamthitta, 87 in Alappuzha, 77 in Kollam, 62 in Kannur, 37 in Idukki and 25 in Wayanad.	Total cases (51772) Recovered (38515) Deaths (219)
August	23 August	1908 cases and 5 deaths : 397 in Thiruvananthapuram, 241 in Alappuzha, 200 in Ernakulam, 186 in Malappuram, 143 in Kannur, 133 in Kollam, 119 in Kozhikode, 116 in Thrissur, 106 in Kottayam, 104 in Pathanamthitta, 85 in Kasargod, 39 in Palakkad, 29 in Idukki and 10 in Wayanad.	Total cases (51772) Recovered (38515) Deaths (219)
August	24 August	1247 cases and 11 deaths : 182 in Thiruvananthapuram, 169 in Malappuram, 165 in Ernakulam, 118 in Kasargod, 112 in Kollam, 99 in Palakkad, 89 in Kottayam, 81 in Kozhikode, 76 in Kannur, 60 in Alappuzha, 46 in Thrissur, 20 in Wayanad, 19 in Idukki and 6 in Pathanamthitta.	Total cases (51772) Recovered (38515) Deaths (219)
August	25 August	2375 cases and 10 deaths : 454 in Malappuram, 391 in Thiruvananthapuram, 260 in Kozhikode, 227 in Thrissur, 170 in Alappuzha, 163 in Ernakulam, 152 in Palakkad, 150 in Kannur, 99 in Kasargod, 93 in Pathanamthitta, 87 in Kollam, 86 in Kottayam, 37 in Wayanad and 6 in Idukki.	Total cases (51772) Recovered (38515) Deaths (219)
August	26 August	2476 cases and 13 deaths : 461 in Thiruvananthapuram, 352 in Malappuram, 215 in Kozhikode, 204 in Thrissur, 193 each in Alappuzha and Ernakulam, 180 in Pathanamthitta, 137 in Kottayam, 133 in Kollam, 128 in Kannur, 101 in Kasargod, 86 in Palakkad, 63 in Idukki and 30 in Wayanad.	Total cases (51772) Recovered (38515) Deaths (219)
August	27 August	2406 cases and 10 deaths : 352 in Thiruvananthapuram, 238 in Kozhikode, 231 in Kasargod, 230 in Malappuram, 195 in Palakkad, 189 in Kottayam, 176 in Kollam, 172 in Alappuzha, 167 in Pathanamthitta, 162 in Thrissur, 140 in Ernakulam, 102 in Kannur, 27 in Idukki and 25 in Wayanad.	Total cases (51772) Recovered (38515) Deaths (219)
August	28 August	2543 cases and 7 deaths : 532 in Thiruvananthapuram, 298 in Malappuram, 286 in Alappuzha, 207 in Ernakulam, 189 in Thrissur, 174 in Kozhikode, 157 in Kasargod, 156 in Kollam, 135 in Kannur, 127 in Palakkad, 126 in Kottayam, 88 in Pathanamthitta, 49 in Idukki and 19 in Wayanad.	Total cases (51772) Recovered (38515) Deaths (219)
August	29 August	2397 cases and 6 deaths : 408 in Thiruvananthapuram, 379 in Malappuram, 234 in Kollam, 225 in Thrissur, 198 in Kasargod, 175 in Alappuzha, 152 in Kozhikode, 139 in Kottayam, 136 in Ernakulam, 133 in Palakkad, 95 in Kannur, 75 in Pathanamthitta, 27 in Idukki and 21 in Wayanad.	Total cases (51772) Recovered (38515) Deaths (219)
August	30 August	2154 cases and 7 deaths : 310 in Thiruvananthapuram, 304 in Kozhikode, 231 in Ernakulam, 223 in Kottayam, 195 in Malappuram, 159 in Kasargod, 151 each in Kollam and Thrissur, 133 in Pathanamthitta, 112 in Kannur, 92 in Alappuzha, 45 in Palakkad, 35 in Idukki and 13 in Wayanad.	Total cases (51772) Recovered (38515) Deaths (219)
August	30 August	1530 cases and 7 deaths : 221 in Thiruvananthapuram, 210 in Ernakulam, 177 in Malappuram, 137 in Alappuzha, 131 in Kollam, 117 in Kozhikode, 107 in Pathanamthitta, 103 in Kasargod, 86 in Kottayam, 85 in Thrissur, 74 in Kannur, 42 in Palakkad, 25 in Wayanad and 15 in Idukki.	Total cases (51772) Recovered (38515) Deaths (219)
September	1 September	1140 cases and 4 deaths : 227 in Thiruvananthapuram, 191 in Malappuram, 161 in Ernakulam, 155 in Kozhikode, 133 in Thrissur, 77 in Kannur, 62 in Kottayam, 42 in Palakkad, 32 in Alappuzha, 25 in Kollam, 15 in Kasargod, 12 in Pathanamthitta and 8 in Wayanad.	Total cases (120721) Recovered (76684) Deaths (433)
September	2 September	1547 cases and 7 deaths : 228 in Thiruvananthapuram, 204 in Kozhikode, 159 in Alappuzha, 146 in Malappuram, 145 in Kottayam, 142 in Kannur, 136 in Ernakulam, 121 in Thrissur, 88 in Kasargod, 81 in Kollam, 38 in Wayanad, 30 in Palakkad, 17 in Pathanamthitta and 12 in Idukki.	Total cases (120721) Recovered (76684) Deaths (433)
September	3 September	1553 cases and 10 deaths : 317 in Thiruvananthapuram, 164 in Ernakulam, 160 in Kottayam, 133 in Kasargod, 131 in Kozhikode, 118 in Pathanamthitta, 93 in Thrissur, 91 in Malappuram, 87 in Alappuzha, 74 in Kannur, 65 in Kollam, 58 in Palakkad, 44 in Idukki and 18 in Wayanad.	Total cases (120721) Recovered (76684) Deaths (433)
September	4 September	2479 cases and 11 deaths : 477 in Thiruvananthapuram, 274 in Ernakulam, 248 in Kollam, 236 in Kasargod, 204 in Thrissur, 178 each in Kottayam and Malappuram, 167 in Kozhikode, 141 in Pathanamthitta, 115 in Kannur, 106 in Alappuzha, 84 in Wayanad, 42 in Palakkad and 29 in Idukki.	Total cases (120721) Recovered (76684) Deaths (433)
September	5 September	2655 cases and 11 deaths : 590 in Thiruvananthapuram, 276 in Kasargod, 249 in Malappuram, 244 in Kozhikode, 222 in Kannur, 186 in Ernakulam, 170 in Kollam, 169 in Thrissur, 148 in Pathanamthitta, 131 in Alappuzha, 119 in Kottayam, 100 in Palakkad, 31 in Idukki and 20 in Wayanad.	Total cases (120721) Recovered (76684) Deaths (433)
September	6 September	3082 cases and 10 deaths : 528 in Thiruvananthapuram, 324 in Malappuram, 328 in Kollam, 281 in Ernakulam, 264 in Kozhikode, 221 in Alappuzha, 218 in Kasargod, 200 in Kannur, 195 in Kottayam, 169 in Thrissur, 162 in Palakkad, 113 in Pathanamthitta, 40 in Wayanad and 39 in Idukki.	Total cases (120721) Recovered (76684) Deaths (433)
September	7 September	1648 cases and 12 deaths : 260 in Kannur, 253 in Thiruvananthapuram, 187 in Malappuram, 154 in Kottayam, 134 in Kasargod, 130 in Ernakulam, 128 in Thrissur, 118 in Palakkad, 103 in Kozhikode, 78 in Alappuzha, 71 in Kollam, 24 in Pathanamthitta and 4 each in Idukki and Wayanad.	Total cases (120721) Recovered (76684) Deaths (433)
September	8 September	3026 cases and 13 deaths : 562 in Thiruvananthapuram, 358 in Malappuram, 318 in Ernakulam, 246 in Kozhikode, 226 in Palakkad, 217 in Alappuzha, 209 in Kollam, 168 in Kottayam, 166 in Kasargod, 160 in Pathanamthitta, 158 in Kannur, 129 in Thrissur, 85 in Idukki and 24 in Wayanad.	Total cases (120721) Recovered (76684) Deaths (433)
September	9 September	3402 cases and 12 deaths : 531 in Thiruvananthapuram, 362 in Kollam, 330 in Kozhikode, 323 in Thrissur, 276 in Ernakulam, 270 in Kasargod, 251 in Kannur, 240 in Alappuzha, 201 in Malappuram, 196 in Kottayam, 190 in Pathanamthitta, 131 in Palakkad, 77 in Wayanad and 24 in Idukki.	Total cases (120721) Recovered (76684) Deaths (433)
September	10 September	3349 cases and 12 deaths : 558 in Thiruvananthapuram, 330 in Malappuram, 300 in Thrissur, 276 in Kannur, 267 in Alappuzha, 261 in Kozhikode, 244 in Kollam, 227 in Ernakulam, 217 in Kottayam, 194 in Palakkad, 140 in Kasargod, 135 in Pathanamthitta, 105 in Idukki and 95 in Wayanad.	Total cases (120721) Recovered (76684) Deaths (433)
September	11 September	2988 cases and 14 deaths : 494 in Thiruvananthapuram, 390 in Malappuram, 303 in Kollam, 295 in Ernakulam, 261 in Kozhikode, 256 in Kannur, 221 in Kottayam, 200 in Alappuzha, 184 in Thrissur, 109 in Palakkad, 102 in Kasargod, 93 in Pathanamthitta, 52 in Wayanad and 28 in Idukki.	Total cases (120721) Recovered (76684) Deaths (433)
September	12 September	2885 cases and 15 deaths : 566 in Thiruvananthapuram, 310 in Malappuram, 286 in Kozhikode, 265 in Kollam, 207 in Kannur, 188 in Ernakulam, 184 in Palakkad, 172 in Thrissur, 166 in Kottayam, 163 in Alappuzha, 150 in Kasargod, 88 in Pathanamthitta, 86 in Idukki and 54 in Wayanad.	Total cases (120721) Recovered (76684) Deaths (433)
September	13 September	3139 cases and 14 deaths : 412 in Thiruvananthapuram, 399 in Kozhikode, 378 in Malappuram, 326 in Ernakulam, 252 in Alappuzha, 234 in Kannur, 233 in Palakkad, 205 in Kollam, 196 in Kottayam, 182 in Thrissur, 124 in Kasargod, 102 in Pathanamthitta, 56 in Wayanad and 40 in Idukki.	Total cases (120721) Recovered (76684) Deaths (433)
September	14 September	2540 cases and 15 deaths : 482 in Malappuram, 382 in Kozhikode, 332 in Thiruvananthapuram, 255 in Ernakulam, 232 in Kannur, 175 in Palakkad, 161 in Thrissur, 142 in Kollam, 122 in Kottayam, 107 in Alappuzha, 58 in Idukki, 56 in Kasargod, 20 in Wayanad and 16 in Pathanamthitta.	Total cases (120721) Recovered (76684) Deaths (433)
September	15 September	3215 cases and 12 deaths : 656 in Thiruvananthapuram, 348 in Malappuram, 338 in Alappuzha, 260 in Kozhikode, 239 in Ernakulam, 234 in Kollam, 213 in Kannur, 192 in Kottayam, 188 in Thrissur, 172 in Kasargod, 146 in Pathanamthitta, 136 in Palakkad, 64 in Wayanad and 29 in Idukki.	Total cases (120721) Recovered (76684) Deaths (433)
September	16 September	3830 cases and 14 deaths : 675 in Thiruvananthapuram, 468 in Kozhikode, 323 in Alappuzha, 319 in Ernakulam, 300 in Kollam, 298 in Malappuram, 263 in Thrissur, 247 in Kannur, 236 in Pathanamthitta, 220 in Palakkad, 187 in Kottayam, 119 in Kasargod, 99 in Wayanad and 76 in Idukki.	Total cases (120721) Recovered (76684) Deaths (433)
September	17 September	4531 cases and 10 deaths : 820 in Thiruvananthapuram, 545 in Kozhikode, 383 in Ernakulam, 367 in Alappuzha, 351 in Malappuram, 319 in Kasargod, 296 in Thrissur, 260 in Kannur, 241 in Palakkad, 218 in Kollam, 204 in Kottayam, 136 in Pathanamthitta, 107 in Wayanad and 104 in Idukki.	Total cases (120721) Recovered (76684) Deaths (433)
September	18 September	4167 cases and 12 deaths : 926 in Thiruvananthapuram, 404 in Kozhikode, 355 in Kollam, 348 in Ernakulam, 330 in Kannur, 326 in Thrissur, 297 in Malappuram, 274 in Alappuzha, 268 in Palakkad, 225 in Kottayam, 145 in Kasargod, 101 in Pathanamthitta, 100 in Idukki and 68 in Wayanad.	Total cases (120721) Recovered (76684) Deaths (433)
September	19 September	4644 cases and 18 deaths : 824 in Thiruvananthapuram, 534 in Malappuram, 436 in Kollam, 412 in Kozhikode, 351 each in Ernakulam and Thrissur, 349 in Palakkad, 348 in Alappuzha, 263 in Kottayam, 222 in Kannur, 221 in Pathanamthitta, 191 in Kasargod, 95 in Wayanad and 47 in Idukki.	Total cases (120721) Recovered (76684) Deaths (433)
September	20 September	4696 cases and 16 deaths : 892 in Thiruvananthapuram, 537 in Ernakulam, 536 in Kozhikode, 483 in Malappuram, 330 in Kollam, 322 in Thrissur, 289 in Palakkad, 274 in Kottayam, 242 in Kannur, 219 in Alappuzha, 208 in Kasargod, 190 in Pathanamthitta, 97 in Wayanad and 77 in Idukki.	Total cases (120721) Recovered (76684) Deaths (433)
September	21 September	2910 cases and 18 deaths : 533 in Thiruvananthapuram, 376 in Kozhikode, 349 in Malappuram, 314 in Kannur, 299 in Ernakulam, 195 in Kollam, 183 in Thrissur, 167 in Palakkad, 156 in Kottayam, 112 in Alappuzha, 110 in Kasargod, 82 in Idukki and 18 each in Pathanamthitta and Wayanad.	Total cases (120721) Recovered (76684) Deaths (433)
September	22 September	4125 cases and 19 deaths : 681 in Thiruvananthapuram, 444 in Malappuram, 406 in Ernakulam, 403 in Alappuzha, 394 in Kozhikode, 369 in Thrissur, 347 in Kollam, 242 in Palakkad, 207 in Pathanamthitta, 197 in Kasargod, 169 in Kottayam, 143 in Kannur, 81 in Wayanad and 42 in Idukki.	Total cases (120721) Recovered (76684) Deaths (433)
September	23 September	5376 cases and 20 deaths : 852 in Thiruvananthapuram, 624 in Ernakulam, 512 in Malappuram, 504 in Kozhikode, 503 in Kollam, 501 in Alappuzha, 478 in Thrissur, 365 in Kannur, 278 in Palakkad, 262 in Kottayam, 223 in Pathanamthitta, 136 in Kasargod, 79 in Idukki and 59 in Wayanad.	Total cases (120721) Recovered (76684) Deaths (433)
September	24 September	6324 cases and 21 deaths : 883 in Kozhikode, 875 in Thiruvananthapuram, 763 in Malappuram, 590 in Ernakulam, 474 in Thrissur, 453 in Alappuzha, 440 in Kollam, 406 in Kannur, 353 in Palakkad, 341 in Kottayam, 300 in Kasargod, 189 in Pathanamthitta, 151 in Idukki and 106 in Wayanad.	Total cases (120721) Recovered (76684) Deaths (433)
September	25 September	6477 cases and 22 deaths : 814 in Thiruvananthapuram, 784 in Malappuram, 690 in Kozhikode, 655 in Ernakulam, 607 in Thrissur, 569 in Kollam, 551 in Alappuzha, 419 each in Kannur and Palakkad, 322 in Kottayam, 268 in Kasargod, 191 in Pathanamthitta, 114 in Idukki and 74 in Wayanad.	Total cases (120721) Recovered (76684) Deaths (433)
September	26 September	7006 cases and 21 deaths : 1050 in Thiruvananthapuram, 826 in Malappuram, 729 in Ernakulam, 684 in Kozhikode, 594 in Thrissur, 589 in Kollam, 547 in Palakkad, 435 in Kannur, 414 in Alappuzha, 389 in Kottayam, 329 in Pathanamthitta, 224 in Kasargod, 107 in Idukki and 89 in Wayanad.	Total cases (120721) Recovered (76684) Deaths (433)
September	27 September	7445 cases and 21 deaths : 956 in Kozhikode, 924 in Ernakulam, 915 in Malappuram, 853 in Thiruvananthapuram, 690 in Kollam, 573 in Thrissur, 488 in Palakkad, 476 in Alappuzha, 426 in Kottayam, 332 in Kannur, 263 in Pathanamthitta, 252 in Kasargod, 172 in Wayanad and 125 in Idukki.	Total cases (120721) Recovered (76684) Deaths (433)
September	28 September	4538 cases and 20 deaths : 918 in Kozhikode, 537 in Ernakulam, 486 in Thiruvananthapuram, 405 in Malappuram, 383 in Thrissur, 378 in Palakkad, 341 in Kollam, 310 in Kannur, 249 in Alappuzha, 213 in Kottayam, 122 in Kasargod, 114 in Idukki, 44 in Wayanad and 38 in Pathanamthitta.	Total cases (120721) Recovered (76684) Deaths (433)
September	29 September	7354 cases and 22 deaths : 1040 in Malappuram, 935 in Thiruvananthapuram, 859 in Ernakulam, 837 in Kozhikode, 583 in Kollam, 524 in Alappuzha, 484 in Thrissur, 453 in Kasargod, 432 in Kannur, 374 in Palakkad, 336 in Kottayam, 271 in Pathanamthitta, 169 in Wayanad and 57 in Idukki.	Total cases (120721) Recovered (76684) Deaths (433)
September	30 September	8830 cases and 23 deaths : 1056 in Ernakulam, 986 in Thiruvananthapuram, 977 in Malappuram, 942 in Kozhikode, 812 in Kollam, 808 in Thrissur, 679 in Alappuzha, 631 in Palakkad, 519 in Kannur, 442 in Kottayam, 321 in Kasargod, 286 in Pathanamthitta, 214 in Wayanad, 157 in Idukki.	Total cases (120721) Recovered (76684) Deaths (433)
October	1 October	8135 cases and 29 deaths : 1072 in Kozhikode, 968 in Malappuram, 934 in Ernakulam, 856 in Thiruvananthapuram, 804 in Alappuzha, 633 in Kollam, 613 in Thrissur, 513 in Palakkad, 471 in Kasargod, 435 in Kannur, 340 in Kottayam, 223 in Pathanamthitta, 143 in Wayanad and 130 in Idukki.	Total cases (227983) Recovered (212100) Deaths (739)
October	2 October	9258 cases and 20 deaths : 1146 in Kozhikode, 1096 in Thiruvananthapuram, 1042 in Ernakulam, 1016 in Malappuram, 892 in Kollam, 812 in Thrissur, 633 in Palakkad, 625 in Kannur, 605 in Alappuzha, 476 in Kasargod, 432 in Kottayam, 239 in Pathanamthitta, 136 in Idukki and 108 in Wayanad.	Total cases (227983) Recovered (212100) Deaths (739)
October	3 October	7834 cases and 22 deaths : 1049 in Thiruvananthapuram, 973 in Malappuram, 941 in Kozhikode, 925 in Ernakulam, 778 in Thrissur, 633 in Alappuzha, 534 in Kollam, 296 in Palakkad, 423 in Kannur, 342 in Kottayam, 296 in Pathanamthitta, 257 in Kasargod, 106 in Idukki and 81 in Wayanad.	Total cases (227983) Recovered (212100) Deaths (739)
October	4 October	8553 cases and 23 deaths : 1164 in Kozhikode, 1119 in Thiruvananthapuram, 952 in Ernakulam, 866 in Kollam, 793 in Thrissur, 792 in Malappuram, 555 in Kannur, 544 in Alappuzha, 496 in Palakkad, 474 in Kottayam, 315 in Pathanamthitta, 278 in Kasargod, 109 in Wayanad and 96 in Idukki.	Total cases (227983) Recovered (212100) Deaths (739)
October	5 October	5042 cases and 20 deaths : 705 in Ernakulam, 700 in Thiruvananthapuram, 641 in Kozhikode, 606 in Malappuram, 458 in Kollam, 425 in Thrissur, 354 in Kottayam, 339 in Kannur, 281 in Palakkad, 207 in Kasargod, 199 in Alappuzha, 71 in Idukki, 31 in Wayanad and 25 in Pathanamthitta.	Total cases (227983) Recovered (212100) Deaths (739)
October	6 October	7871 cases and 25 deaths : 989 in Thiruvananthapuram, 854 in Malappuram, 845 in Kollam, 837 in Ernakulam, 757 in Thrissur, 736 in Kozhikode, 545 in Kannur, 520 in Palakkad, 427 in Kottayam, 424 in Alappuzha, 416 in Kasargod, 330 in Pathanamthitta, 135 in Wayanad and 56 in Idukki.	Total cases (227983) Recovered (212100) Deaths (739)
October	7 October	10606 cases and 22 deaths : 1576 in Kozhikode, 1182 in Thiruvananthapuram, 1201 in Ernakulam, 1350 in Malappuram, 948 in Thrissur, 852 in Kollam, 672 in Alappuzha, 650 in Palakkad, 602 in Kannur, 490 in Kottayam, 432 in Kasargod, 393 in Pathanamthitta, 120 in Idukki and 138 in Wayanad.	Total cases (227983) Recovered (212100) Deaths (739)
October	8 October	5445 cases and 26 deaths : 1024 in Malappuram, 688 in Kozhikode, 497 in Kollam, 467 in Thiruvananthapuram, 391 in Ernakulam, 385 in Thrissur, 377 in Kannur, 317 in Alappuzha, 295 in Pathanamthitta, 285 in Palakkad, 236 in Kasargod, 231 in Kottayam, 131 in Wayanad and 121 in Idukki.	Total cases (227983) Recovered (212100) Deaths (739)
October	9 October	9250 cases and 25 deaths : 1205 in Kozhikode, 1174 in Malappuram, 1012 in Thiruvananthapuram, 911 in Ernakulam, 793 in Alappuzha, 755 in Thrissur, 714 in Kollam, 672 in Palakkad, 556 in Kannur, 522 in Kottayam, 366 in Kasargod, 290 in Pathanamthitta, 153 in Idukki and 127 in Wayanad.	Total cases (227983) Recovered (212100) Deaths (739)
October	10 October	11755 cases and 23 deaths : 1632 in Malappuram, 1324 in Kozhikode, 1310 in Thiruvananthapuram, 1208 in Thrissur, 1191 in Ernakulam, 1107 in Kollam, 843 in Alappuzha, 727 in Kannur, 677 in Palakkad, 539 in Kasargod, 523 in Kottayam, 348 in Pathanamthitta, 187 in Wayanad and 139 in Idukki.	Total cases (227983) Recovered (212100) Deaths (739)
October	11 October	9347 cases and 25 deaths : 1451 in Malappuram, 1228 in Ernakulam, 1219 in Kozhikode, 960 in Thrissur, 797 in Thiruvananthapuram, 712 in Kollam, 640 in Palakkad, 619 in Alappuzha, 417 in Kottayam, 413 in Kannur, 378 in Pathanamthitta, 242 in Kasargod, 148 in Wayanad and 123 in Idukki.	Total cases (227983) Recovered (212100) Deaths (739)
October	12 October	5930 cases and 22 deaths : 869 in Kozhikode, 740 in Malappuram, 697 in Thrissur, 629 in Thiruvananthapuram, 618 in Alappuzha, 480 in Ernakulam, 382 in Kottayam, 343 in Kollam, 295 in Kasargod, 288 in Palakkad, 274 in Kannur, 186 in Pathanamthitta, 94 in Idukki and 35 in Wayanad.	Total cases (227983) Recovered (212100) Deaths (739)
October	13 October	8764 cases and 21 deaths : 1139 in Malappuram, 1122 in Ernakulam, 1113 in Kozhikode, 1010 in Thrissur, 907 in Kollam, 777 in Thiruvananthapuram, 606 in Palakkad, 488 in Alappuzha, 476 in Kottayam, 370 in Kannur, 323 in Kasargod, 244 in Pathanamthitta, 110 in Wayanad and 79 in Idukki.	Total cases (227983) Recovered (212100) Deaths (739)
October	14 October	6244 cases and 20 deaths : 1013 in Malappuram, 793 in Ernakulam, 661 in Kozhikode, 581 each in Thiruvananthapuram and Thrissur, 551 in Kollam, 456 in Alappuzha, 364 in Palakkad, 350 in Kottayam, 303 in Kannur, 224 in Kasargod, 169 in Pathanamthitta, 114 in Idukki and 84 in Wayanad.	Total cases (227983) Recovered (212100) Deaths (739)
October	15 October	7789 cases and 23 deaths : 1264 in Kozhikode, 1209 in Ernakulam, 867 in Thrissur, 679 in Thiruvananthapuram, 557 in Kannur, 551 in Kollam, 521 in Alappuzha, 495 in Kottayam, 447 in Malappuram, 354 in Palakkad, 311 in Kasargod, 248 in Pathanamthitta, 143 each in Idukki and Wayanad.	Total cases (227983) Recovered (212100) Deaths (739)
October	16 October	7283 cases and 24 deaths : 1025 in Malappuram, 970 in Kozhikode, 809 in Thrissur, 648 in Palakkad, 606 in Ernakulam, 595 in Thiruvananthapuram, 563 in Alappuzha, 432 in Kottayam, 418 in Kollam, 405 in Kannur, 296 in Pathanamthitta, 234 in Kasargod, 158 in Wayanad and 124 in Idukki.	Total cases (227983) Recovered (212100) Deaths (739)
October	17 October	9016 cases and 26 deaths : 1519 in Malappuram, 1109 in Thrissur, 1022 in Ernakulam, 926 in Kozhikode, 848 in Thiruvananthapuram, 688 in Palakkad, 656 in Kollam, 629 in Alappuzha, 464 in Kannur, 411 in Kottayam, 280 in Kasargod, 203 in Pathanamthitta, 140 in Idukki and 121 in Wayanad.	Total cases (227983) Recovered (212100) Deaths (739)
October	18 October	7631 cases and 22 deaths : 1399 in Malappuram, 976 in Kozhikode, 862 in Thrissur, 730 in Ernakulam, 685 in Thiruvananthapuram, 540 in Kollam, 514 in Kottayam, 462 in Kannur, 385 in Alappuzha, 342 in Palakkad, 251 in Kasargod, 179 in Pathanamthitta, 162 in Idukki and 144 in Wayanad.	Total cases (227983) Recovered (212100) Deaths (739)
October	19 October	5022 cases and 21 deaths : 910 in Malappuram, 772 in Kozhikode, 598 in Ernakulam, 533 in Thrissur, 516 in Thiruvananthapuram, 378 in Kollam, 340 in Alappuzha, 293 in Kannur, 271 in Palakkad, 180 in Kottayam, 120 in Kasargod, 51 in Wayanad, 32 in Pathanamthitta and 28 in Idukki.	Total cases (227983) Recovered (212100) Deaths (739)
October	20 October	6591 cases and 24 deaths : 896 in Thrissur, 806 in Kozhikode, 786 in Malappuram, 644 in Ernakulam, 592 in Alappuzha, 569 in Kollam, 473 in Kottayam, 470 in Thiruvananthapuram, 403 in Palakkad, 400 in Kannur, 248 in Pathanamthitta, 145 in Kasargod, 87 in Wayanad and 72 in Idukki.	Total cases (227983) Recovered (212100) Deaths (739)
October	21 October	8369 cases and 26 deaths : 1190 in Ernakulam, 1158 in Kozhikode, 946 in Thrissur, 820 in Alappuzha, 742 in Kollam, 668 in Malappuram, 657 in Thiruvananthapuram, 566 in Kannur, 526 in Kottayam, 417 in Palakkad, 247 in Pathanamthitta, 200 in Kasargod, 132 in Wayanad and 100 in Idukki.	Total cases (227983) Recovered (212100) Deaths (739)
October	22 October	7482 cases and 23 deaths : 932 in Kozhikode, 929 in Ernakulam, 897 in Malappuram, 847 in Thrissur, 838 in Thiruvananthapuram, 837 in Alappuzha, 481 in Kollam, 465 in Palakkad, 377 in Kannur, 332 in Kottayam, 216 in Kasargod, 195 in Pathanamthitta, 71 in Wayanad and 65 in Idukki.	Total cases (227983) Recovered (212100) Deaths (739)
October	23 October	8511 cases and 26 deaths : 1375 in Malappuram, 1020 in Thrissur, 890 in Thiruvananthapuram, 874 in Ernakulam, 751 in Kozhikode, 716 in Alappuzha, 671 in Kollam, 531 in Palakkad, 497 in Kannur, 426 in Kottayam, 285 in Pathanamthitta, 189 in Kasargod, 146 in Wayanad and 140 in Idukki.	Total cases (227983) Recovered (212100) Deaths (739)
October	24 October	8253 cases and 25 deaths : 1170 in Ernakulam, 1086 in Thrissur, 909 in Thiruvananthapuram, 770 in Kozhikode, 737 in Kollam, 719 in Malappuram, 706 in Alappuzha, 458 in Kottayam, 457 in Palakkad, 430 in Kannur, 331 in Pathanamthitta, 201 in Idukki, 200 in Kasargod and 79 in Wayanad.	Total cases (227983) Recovered (212100) Deaths (739)
October	25 October	6843 cases and 26 deaths : 1011 in Thrissur, 869 in Kozhikode, 816 in Ernakulam, 712 in Thiruvananthapuram, 653 in Malappuram, 542 in Alappuzha, 527 in Kollam, 386 in Kottayam, 374 in Palakkad, 303 in Pathanamthitta, 274 in Kannur, 152 in Idukki, 137 in Kasargod and 87 in Wayanad.	Total cases (227983) Recovered (212100) Deaths (739)
October	26 October	4287 cases and 20 deaths : 853 in Malappuram, 513 in Thiruvananthapuram, 497 in Kozhikode, 480 in Thrissur, 457 in Ernakulam, 332 in Alappuzha, 316 in Kollam, 276 in Palakkad, 194 in Kottayam, 174 in Kannur, 79 in Idukki, 64 in Kasargod, 28 in Wayanad and 24 in Pathanamthitta.	Total cases (227983) Recovered (212100) Deaths (739)
October	27 October	5457 cases and 24 deaths : 730 in Thrissur, 716 in Ernakulam, 706 in Malappuram, 647 in Alappuzha, 597 in Kozhikode, 413 in Thiruvananthapuram, 395 in Kottayam, 337 in Palakkad, 329 in Kollam, 258 in Kannur, 112 in Pathanamthitta, 103 in Wayanad, 65 in Kasargod and 49 in Wayanad.	Total cases (227983) Recovered (212100) Deaths (739)
October	28 October	8790 cases and 27 deaths : 1250 in Ernakulam, 1149 in Kozhikode, 1018 in Thrissur, 935 in Kollam, 790 in Alappuzha, 785 in Thiruvananthapuram, 594 in Kottayam, 548 in Malappuram, 506 in Kannur, 449 in Palakkad, 260 in Pathanamthitta, 203 in Kasargod, 188 in Wayanad and 115 in Idukki.	Total cases (227983) Recovered (212100) Deaths (739)
October	29 October	7020 cases and 26 deaths : 983 in Thrissur, 802 in Ernakulam, 789 in Thiruvananthapuram, 788 in Alappuzha, 692 in Kozhikode, 589 in Malappuram, 482 in Kollam, 419 in Kannur, 389 in Kottayam, 369 in Palakkad, 270 in Pathanamthitta, 187 in Kasargod, 168 in Idukki and 93 in Wayanad.	Total cases (227983) Recovered (212100) Deaths (739)
October	30 October	6638 cases and 28 deaths : 1096 in Thrissur, 761 in Malappuram, 722 in Kozhikode, 674 in Ernakulam, 664 in Alappuzha, 587 in Thiruvananthapuram, 482 each in Kollam and Palakkad, 367 in Kottayam, 341 in Kannur, 163 in Pathanamthitta, 133 in Kasargod, 90 in Wayanad and 76 in Idukki.	Total cases (227983) Recovered (212100) Deaths (739)
October	31 October	7983 cases and 27 deaths : 1114 in Ernakulam, 1112 in Thrissur, 834 in Kozhikode, 790 in Thiruvananthapuram, 769 in Malappuram, 741 in Kollam, 645 in Alappuzha, 584 in Kottayam, 496 in Palakkad, 337 in Kannur, 203 in Pathanamthitta, 156 in Kasargod, 145 in Wayanad and 57 in Idukki.	Total cases (227983) Recovered (212100) Deaths (739)
November	1 November	7025 cases and 28 deaths : 1042 in Ernakulam, 943 in Thrissur, 888 in Kozhikode, 711 in Kollam, 616 in Alappuzha, 591 in Thiruvananthapuram, 522 in Malappuram, 435 in Palakkad, 434 in Kottayam, 306 in Kannur, 160 in Pathanamthitta, 148 in Idukki, 143 in Kasargod and 86 in Wayanad.	Total cases (171290) Recovered (198389) Deaths (760)
November	2 November	4138 cases and 21 deaths : 576 in Kozhikode, 518 in Ernakulam, 498 in Alappuzha, 467 in Malappuram, 433 in Thrissur, 361 in Thiruvananthapuram, 350 in Kollam, 286 in Palakkad, 246 in Kottayam, 195 in Kannur, 60 in Idukki, 58 in Kasargod, 46 in Wayanad and 44 in Pathanamthitta.	Total cases (171290) Recovered (198389) Deaths (760)
November	3 November	6862 cases and 26 deaths : 856 in Thrissur, 850 in Ernakulam, 842 in Kozhikode, 760 in Alappuzha, 654 in Thiruvananthapuram, 583 in Kollam, 507 in Kottayam, 467 in Malappuram, 431 in Palakkad, 335 in Kannur, 245 in Pathanamthitta, 147 in Kasargod, 118 in Wayanad and 67 in Idukki.	Total cases (171290) Recovered (198389) Deaths (760)
November	4 November	8516 cases and 28 deaths : 1197 in Ernakulam, 1114 in Thrissur, 951 in Kozhikode, 937 in Kollam, 784 in Malappuram, 765 in Alappuzha, 651 in Thiruvananthapuram, 571 in Kottayam, 453 in Palakkad, 370 in Kannur, 204 in Idukki, 186 in Pathanamthitta, 182 in Kasargod and 151 in Wayanad.	Total cases (171290) Recovered (198389) Deaths (760)
November	5 November	6280 cases and 26 deaths : 900 in Thrissur, 828 in Kozhikode, 756 in Thiruvananthapuram, 749 in Ernakulam, 660 in Alappuzha, 627 in Malappuram, 523 in Kollam, 479 in Kottayam, 372 in Palakkad, 329 in Kannur, 212 in Pathanamthitta, 155 in Kasargod, 116 in Idukki and 114 in Wayanad.	Total cases (171290) Recovered (198389) Deaths (760)
November	6 November	7002 cases and 27 deaths : 951 in Thrissur, 763 in Kozhikode, 761 in Malappuram, 673 in Ernakulam, 671 in Kollam, 643 in Alappuzha, 617 in Thiruvananthapuram, 464 in Palakkad, 461 in Kottayam, 354 in Kannur, 183 in Pathanamthitta, 167 in Wayanad, 157 in Idukki and 137 in Kasargod.	Total cases (171290) Recovered (198389) Deaths (760)
November	7 November	7201 cases and 28 deaths : 1042 in Ernakulam, 971 in Kozhikode, 864 in Thrissur, 719 in Thiruvananthapuram, 696 in Alappuzha, 642 in Malappuram, 574 in Kollam, 500 in Kottayam, 465 in Palakkad, 266 in Kannur, 147 in Pathanamthitta, 113 in Wayanad, 108 in Idukki and 94 in Kasargod.	Total cases (171290) Recovered (198389) Deaths (760)
November	8 November	6853 cases and 24 deaths : 644 in Ernakulam, 641 in Thrissur, 575 in Kozhikode, 540 in Malappuram, 488 in Kollam, 479 in Alappuzha, 421 in Thiruvananthapuram, 406 in Kottayam, 344 in Kannur, 306 in Palakkad, 179 in Idukki, 159 in Kasargod, 153 in Pathanamthitta and 105 in Wayanad.	Total cases (171290) Recovered (198389) Deaths (760)
November	9 November	3593 cases and 22 deaths : 548 in Malappuram, 479 in Kozhikode, 433 in Ernakulam, 430 in Thrissur, 353 in Alappuzha, 324 in Thiruvananthapuram, 236 in Kollam, 225 in Palakkad, 203 in Kottayam, 152 in Kannur, 75 in Kasargod, 50 in Wayanad, 43 in Pathanamthitta and 42 in Idukki.	Total cases (171290) Recovered (198389) Deaths (760)
November	10 November	6010 cases and 28 deaths : 807 in Kozhikode, 711 in Thrissur, 685 in Malappuram, 641 in Alappuzha, 583 in Ernakulam, 567 in Thiruvananthapuram, 431 in Kollam, 426 in Kottayam, 342 in Palakkad, 301 in Kannur, 234 in Pathanamthitta, 112 in Wayanad, 89 in Idukki and 81 in Kasargod.	Total cases (171290) Recovered (198389) Deaths (760)
November	11 November	7007 cases and 29 deaths : 977 in Ernakulam, 966 in Thrissur, 830 in Kozhikode, 679 in Kollam, 580 in Kottayam, 527 in Malappuram, 521 in Alappuzha, 484 in Thiruvananthapuram, 424 in Palakkad, 264 in Kannur, 230 in Pathanamthitta, 225 in Idukki, 159 in Wayanad and 141 in Kasargod.	Total cases (171290) Recovered (198389) Deaths (760)
November	12 November	5537 cases and 25 deaths : 727 in Thrissur, 696 in Kozhikode, 617 in Malappuram, 568 in Alappuzha, 489 in Ernakulam, 434 in Palakkad, 399 in Kollam, 386 in Thiruvananthapuram, 346 in Kannur, 344 in Kottayam, 185 in Idukki, 138 in Pathanamthitta, 108 in Kasargod and 100 in Wayanad.	Total cases (171290) Recovered (198389) Deaths (760)
November	13 November	5804 cases and 26 deaths : 799 in Kozhikode, 756 in Ernakulam, 677 in Thrissur, 588 in Malappuram, 489 in Kollam, 468 in Alappuzha, 439 in Thiruvananthapuram, 438 in Palakkad, 347 in Kottayam, 240 in Kannur, 189 in Pathanamthitta, 187 in Idukki, 106 in Wayanad and 81 in Kasargod.	Total cases (171290) Recovered (198389) Deaths (760)
November	14 November	6357 cases and 26 deaths : 860 in Ernakulam, 759 in Thrissur, 710 in Kozhikode, 673 in Malappuram, 542 in Alappuzha, 530 in Kollam, 468 in Thiruvananthapuram, 467 in Palakkad, 425 in Kottayam, 363 in Kannur, 171 in Wayanad, 143 in Pathanamthitta, 139 in Kasargod and 107 in Idukki.	Total cases (171290) Recovered (198389) Deaths (760)
November	15 November	4581 cases and 21 deaths : 574 in Kozhikode, 558 in Malappuram, 496 in Alappuzha, 489 in Ernakulam, 425 in Thrissur, 416 in Palakkad, 341 in Kollam, 314 in Thiruvananthapuram, 266 in Kottayam, 203 in Kannur, 171 in Pathanamthitta, 165 in Idukki, 101 in Wayanad and 62 in Kasargod.	Total cases (171290) Recovered (198389) Deaths (760)
November	16 November	2710 cases and 19 deaths : 496 in Malappuram, 402 in Kozhikode, 279 in Ernakulam, 228 in Thrissur, 226 in Alappuzha, 204 in Thiruvananthapuram, 191 in Kollam, 185 in Palakkad, 165 in Kottayam, 110 in Kannur, 83 in Idukki, 64 in Kasargod, 40 in Pathanamthitta and 37 in Wayanad.	Total cases (171290) Recovered (198389) Deaths (760)
November	17 November	5792 cases and 27 deaths : 776 in Malappuram, 682 in Kollam, 667 in Thrissur, 644 in Kozhikode, 613 in Ernakulam, 429 in Kottayam, 391 in Thiruvananthapuram, 380 in Palakkad, 364 in Alappuzha, 335 in Kannur, 202 in Pathanamthitta, 116 in Idukki, 97 in Wayanad and 96 in Kasargod.	Total cases (171290) Recovered (198389) Deaths (760)
November	18 November	6419 cases and 28 deaths : 887 in Ernakulam, 811 in Kozhikode, 703 in Thrissur, 693 in Kollam, 637 in Alappuzha, 507 in Malappuram, 468 in Thiruvananthapuram, 377 in Palakkad, 373 in Kottayam, 249 in Idukki, 234 in Pathanamthitta, 213 in Kannur, 158 in Wayanad and 109 in Kasargod.	Total cases (171290) Recovered (198389) Deaths (760)
November	19 November	5722 cases and 26 deaths : 862 in Malappuram, 631 in Thrissur, 575 in Kozhikode, 527 in Alappuzha, 496 in Palakkad, 456 in Thiruvananthapuram, 423 in Ernakulam, 342 in Kottayam, 338 in Kollam, 337 in Kannur, 276 in Idukki, 200 in Pathanamthitta, 145 in Kasargod and 114 in Wayanad.	Total cases (171290) Recovered (198389) Deaths (760)
November	20 November	6028 cases and 28 deaths : 1054 in Malappuram, 691 in Kozhikode, 653 in Thrissur, 573 in Palakkad, 554 in Ernakulam, 509 in Kollam, 423 in Kottayam, 395 in Alappuzha, 393 in Thiruvananthapuram, 251 in Kannur, 174 in Pathanamthitta, 138 in Kasargod 135 in Wayanad and 85 in Idukki.	Total cases (171290) Recovered (198389) Deaths (760)
November	21 November	5772 cases and 25 deaths : 797 in Ernakulam, 764 in Malappuram, 710 in Kozhikode, 483 in Thrissur, 478 in Palakkad, 464 in Kollam, 423 in Kottayam, 399 in Thiruvananthapuram, 383 in Alappuzha, 216 in Pathanamthitta, 211 in Kannur, 188 in Idukki, 152 in Wayanad and 104 in Kasargod.	Total cases (171290) Recovered (198389) Deaths (760)
November	22 November	5254 cases and 27 deaths : 796 in Malappuram, 612 in Kozhikode, 543 in Thrissur, 494 in Ernakulam, 468 in Palakkad, 433 in Alappuzha, 383 in Thiruvananthapuram, 355 in Kottayam, 314 in Kollam, 233 in Kannur, 220 in Idukki, 169 in Pathanamthitta, 153 in Wayanad and 81 in Kasargod.	Total cases (171290) Recovered (198389) Deaths (760)
November	23 November	3757 cases and 22 deaths : 1023 in Malappuram, 514 in Kozhikode, 331 in Palakkad, 325 in Ernakulam, 279 in Kottayam, 278 in Thrissur, 259 in Alappuzha, 229 in Thiruvananthapuram, 198 in Kollam, 144 in Kannur, 57 in Pathanamthitta, 49 in Idukki, 39 in Wayanad and 32 in Kasargod.	Total cases (171290) Recovered (198389) Deaths (760)
November	24 November	5420 cases and 24 deaths : 852 in Malappuram, 570 in Ernakulam, 556 in Thrissur, 541 in Kozhikode, 462 in Kollam, 461 in Kottayam, 453 in Palakkad, 390 in Alappuzha, 350 in Thiruvananthapuram, 264 in Kannur, 197 in Pathanamthitta, 122 in Idukki, 103 in Wayanad and 99 in Kasargod.	Total cases (171290) Recovered (198389) Deaths (760)
November	25 November	6491 cases and 26 deaths : 833 in Kozhikode, 774 in Ernakulam, 664 in Malappuram, 652 in Thrissur, 546 in Alappuzha, 539 in Kollam, 463 in Palakkad, 461 in Thiruvananthapuram, 450 in Kottayam, 287 in Pathanamthitta, 242 in Kannur, 239 in Wayanad, 238 in Idukki and 103 in Kasargod.	Total cases (171290) Recovered (198389) Deaths (760)
November	26 November	5378 cases and 27 deaths : 719 in Malappuram, 686 in Kozhikode, 573 in Thrissur, 472 in Ernakulam, 457 in Thiruvananthapuram, 425 in Kottayam, 397 in Kollam, 376 in Palakkad, 347 in Alappuzha, 256 in Idukki, 226 in Kannur, 207 in Pathanamthitta, 151 in Wayanad and 86 in Kasargod.	Total cases (171290) Recovered (198389) Deaths (760)
November	27 November	3966 cases and 23 deaths : 612 in Malappuram, 525 in Thrissur, 397 in Ernakulam, 374 in Kozhikode, 351 in Palakkad, 346 in Kottayam, 262 in Thiruvananthapuram, 236 in Alappuzha, 229 in Kollam, 159 in Pathanamthitta, 143 in Idukki, 131 in Kannur, 105 in Wayanad and 96 in Kasargod.	Total cases (171290) Recovered (198389) Deaths (760)
November	28 November	6250 cases and 25 deaths : 812 in Ernakulam, 714 in Kozhikode, 680 in Malappuram, 647 in Thrissur, 629 in Kottayam, 491 in Palakkad, 488 in Thiruvananthapuram, 458 in Kollam, 315 in Kannur, 309 in Alappuzha, 251 in Wayanad, 178 in Idukki, 141 in Pathanamthitta and 137 in Kasargod.	Total cases (171290) Recovered (198389) Deaths (760)
November	29 November	5643 cases and 27 deaths : 851 in Kozhikode, 721 in Malappuram, 525 in Thrissur, 512 in Ernakulam, 426 in Kollam, 399 in Kottayam, 394 in Palakkad, 381 in Alappuzha, 370 in Thiruvananthapuram, 277 in Kannur, 274 in Idukki, 244 in Pathanamthitta, 147 in Wayanad and 122 in Kasargod.	Total cases (171290) Recovered (198389) Deaths (760)
November	30 November	3382 cases and 21 deaths : 611 in Malappuram, 481 in Kozhikode, 317 in Ernakulam, 275 in Alappuzha, 250 in Thrissur, 243 in Kottayam, 242 in Palakkad, 238 in Kollam, 234 in Thiruvananthapuram, 175 in Kannur, 91 in Pathanamthitta, 90 in Wayanad, 86 in Kasargod and 49 in Idukki.	Total cases (171290) Recovered (198389) Deaths (760)
December	1 December	5375 cases and 26 deaths : 886 in Malappuram, 630 in Thrissur, 585 in Kottayam, 516 in Kozhikode, 504 in Ernakulam, 404 in Thiruvananthapuram, 349 in Kollam, 323 in Palakkad, 283 in Pathanamthitta, 279 in Alappuzha, 222 in Kannur, 161 in Idukki, 150 in Wayanad and 83 in Kasargod.	Total cases (5375) Recovered (6151) Deaths (26)

== List of confirmed deaths ==
Details for COVID-19 cases who died in Kerala (as of 6 August 2020)
Case order	Age	Gender	Native	Hospital admitted to	Been to other country	Travel history	Note
1	69	Male	Ernakulam	Government Medical College, Ernakulam	Dubai	Died on 28 March	The patient had a travel history to Dubai. He was admitted to the hospital on March 22 with pneumonia symptoms and later tested positive for coronavirus. He was also suffering from heart disease and high blood pressure and had undergone a bypass surgery earlier.
2	68	Male	Thiruvananthapuram	Government Medical College, Thiruvananthapuram	No	Died on 31 March	The patient was on ventilator support for five days. He had suffered cardiac arrest and paralysis attack while on the life support system. Until now, it is not clear how he had contracted the disease. He had no recent history of foreign travel and according to close relatives, had not come into contact with infected persons.
3	4 Month	Female	Malappuram	Government Medical College, Kozhikode	No	Died on 24 April	The baby with a history of congenital heart disease was admitted on April 21 from a private hospital in Malappuram. She was admitted to the private hospital on April 18 with symptoms of pneumonia. She was referred to the IMCH after she developed "seizure and poor sensorium". She was admitted to the special intensive care unit as she had severe acute respiratory infection. Her throat swab samples were sent for lab tests and they tested positive for the virus. Despite administering antibiotics for pneumonia and giving ventilator support, she continued to be in shock and developed respiratory failure. She had a cardiac arrest and died.
4	73	Female	Thrissur	Chavakkad Govt. Hospital	Mumbai	Died on 21 May	The patient native to Anjangadi, Chavakkad had returned to Kerala on 19 May from Mumbai without a state permit on a private vehicle via road. Later, admitted to Chavakkad Govt. Taluk Hospital due to severe illness. According to reports, the woman had other alignments including hypertension and diabetes. She died while getting an admission to Government Medical College, Thrissur. The death occurred Thursday morning. However, the condition was confirmed by the results of the delayed covalent secretion test.
5	53	Female	Wayanad	Government Medical College, Kozhikode	Abu Dhabi	Died on 24 May	The patient hailing from Kalpetta was an expat and a cancer patient, who had recently returned from Abu Dhabi on 20 May via Cochin International Airport and had been admitted to a private hospital in Calicut. After showing COVID-19 symptoms, her samples were sent for tests. Once confirmed with the infection she was shifted to the Government Medical College, Kozhikode. According to the health department, her health condition worsened and though she was transferred to a special ventilator but her health further deteriorated.
6	62	Female	Kannur	Government Medical College, Kozhikode	No	Died on 25 May	The patient native to Dharmadom, Kannur who was a paralytic, was shifted to the medical college on Friday after she was tested positive for COVID-19. Earlier, she was under treatment for neurological disease in Tellicherry Co-operative Hospital, Thalassery. The source of her infection has not been traced yet. Eight members including her husband tested positive to the virus post her death.
7	68	Male	Telangana	Government Medical College, Thiruvananthapuram	Rajasthan	Died on 27 May	The patient hailing from Telangana reached here on 22 May along with his wife, two children and two relatives on a special train from Jaipur. With neither the requisite travel pass nor other documents, the nomadic family was shifted to the corona care centre at the Institute of Cooperative Management in Poojappura from the Thiruvananthapuram Central railway station. The man was soon shifted to the General Hospital as he showed symptoms of the viral infection. His health condition subsequently deteriorated and he died on Wednesday.
8	65	Male	Kottayam	Government Medical College, Kottayam	Sharjah	Died on 29 May	The patient native to Thiruvalla had been employed in Sharjah, and was flown in from Dubai on 11 May. he had been admitted to an institutional quarantine center in Pathanamthitta since his return and did not exhibit any symptoms of the disease. He was identified as COVID-19 positive after his serum samples were collected on 16 May. He was then shifted to the Pathanamthitta District Hospital, Kozhencherry on 18 May. The patient was brought to the Government Medical College, Kottayam on 25 May after his condition deteriorated. He had several comorbidities including acute diabetes.
9	39	Male	Alappuzha	Government T D Medical College, Alappuzha	Abu Dhabi	Died on 29 May	The patient hailing from Pandanad had returned to the state from Abu Dhabi last week and shifted to an institutional quarantine center. He was under treatment for liver Cirrhosis and later developed complications. He was shifted to Government T D Medical College, Alappuzha on 29 May morning where he died at 3:30 pm. He was a bachelor and worked in Abu Dhabi as a driver.
10	65	Male	Kollam	Govt. District Hospital, Kollam	No	Died on 31 May	The patient native of Kavanad was found dead in his house and brought to Kollam district hospital on 1 June. He had no travel history but his samples were tested under the directive of the medical board.
11	56	Female	Kozhikode	Government Medical College, Kozhikode	Riyadh	Died on 1 June	The deceased woman of native to Mavoor had arrived from Riyadh in Saudi Arabia on 20 May with her husband in a special flight at Kannur airport and was under quarantine. She was shifted to the Government Medical College, Kozhikodeon 25 May after she developed COVID-pneumonia and shifted to intensive care unit on 28 May. She was suffering from heart disease and hypertension.
12	77	Male	Thiruvananthapuram	Government Medical College, Thiruvananthapuram	No	Died on 2 June	The priest hailing from Nalanchira, met with an accident around mid-April and was undergoing treatment at the medical college hospital and Peroorkada hospital. Lately, he developed severe pneumonia and he died on Tuesday morning. Subsequently, his swab test results confirmed that he was afflicted by COVID-19. It is assumed that he might have contracted the deadly virus from one of the two hospitals.
13	73	Female	Palakkad	District Hospital, Palakkad	Chennai	Died on 2 June	The patient had returned to the state from Chennai on 25 May with her son via Walayar and was under home quarantine at her brother's home in Sreekrishnapuram and tested negative. Health officials in Palakkad revealed that she was a chronic diabetic admitted to the District Hospital after she developed complications and died while undergoing treatment. She was admitted to the hospital once again and her samples returned positive for the infection after her demise on 28 May.
14	27	Female	Malappuram	Private Hospital, Kozhikode	Abu Dhabi	Died on 2 June	The patient native to Edappal had returned from Abu Dhabi on 25 May for treatment of cancer and was admitted to a private hospital in Kozhikode. She died on Wednesday and her samples, sent after she developed respiratory problems, tested positive on Thursday.
15	61	Male	Malappuram	Government Medical College, Manjeri	Mumbai	Died on 6 June	The patient is a native of Parappanangadi died at the Government Medical College, Manjeri at 6.30 AM on Saturday. He was a former Santosh Trophy player. He had returned from Mumbai on May 21 with his family. His health condition became bad on 30 May as he was also suffering from pneumonia and acute respiratory distress syndrome. Though the doctors tried plasma therapy on the 61-year-old, the treatment made little improvement in his health condition.
16	87	Male	Thrissur	Government Medical College, Thrissur	No	Died on 7 June	The patient hailing from Engandiyur was under treatment of the virus in a private hospital in Thrissur. He was admitted to the hospital on 2 June with breathing ailments. His sample was sent for COVID-19 testing as he was affected by pneumonia. When his test returned positive on Sunday, he was shifted to the Medical College's isolation ward. He suffered from respiratory ailments and severe pneumonia. His source of infection was yet to be traced.
17	42	Male	Thrissur	Government Medical College, Thrissur	Maldives	Died on 8 June	The patient native of Chalakkudy had arrived from Maldives with his wife, child and mother-in-law. They were in institutional quarantine. He was transferred to a ventilator after developing pneumonia during COVID-19 treatment. He also had kidney failure and shortness of breath. He was one of the first to board a ship from Maldives to Kochi. His infection tests were confirmed on 16 May that he had been convicted.
18	70	Male	Kannur	Government Medical College, Kannur	Muscat	Died on 11 June	The patient native to Iritty, was under treatment for cancer. He had returned from Muscat via Kannur International Airport on 22 May. Though the health workers directed him to observe quarantine at the hospital, he refused to follow it and went to his son's house at Kuthuparamba. His COVID test returned positive earlier on Wednesday and he was taken to the hospital when his condition worsened at night.
19	71	Male	Kannur	Government Medical College, Kannur	Mumbai	Died on 11 June	The patient has reached the state from Mumbai through train on 9 June. He was suffering from heart-related ailments and had breathing trouble. However, he was admitted to Kannur district hospital after suffering from fever and diarrhea. His condition worsened and was shifted to Government Medical College, Kannur on Thursday but died. His sample tested positive for the virus on 12 June.
20	67	Male	Thiruvananthapuram	Government Medical College, Thiruvananthapuram	No	Died on 12 June	The patient native to Vanchiyoor died on 12 June, his COVID-19 results came positive on 15 June. He had respiratory ailments for a long time and was also under treatment for heart disease.
21	28	Male	Kannur	Government Medical College, Kannur	No	Died on 18 June	The patient native to Blathur was a driver of Excise Department of Kerala. His source of infection is yet to be traced. He had been on duty till 12 June with the Mattanur Excise office. He was admitted to a private hospital in Kannur on 12 June with fever and breathlessness. He was diagnosed with pneumonia then and was shifted to the Government Medical College, Kannur on 14 June as his health deteriorated.
22	68	Male	Kollam	Government Medical College, Kollam	Delhi	Died on 22 June	The patient native to Mayyanad had returned to the state from Delhi on 10 June by train to Ernakulam. He reached Kollam on special KSRTC service and was in home quarantine. He was undergoing treatment for acute pneumonia and suffered a heart attack on Monday night. He started showing symptoms of COVID-19 such as fever and shivering on 15 June and was tested positive on 17 June.
23	55	Male	Tamil Nadu	Government Medical College, Manjeri	No	Died on 24 June	The COVID-19 test results of a patient native to Tamil Nadu who died at Government Medical College, Manjeri on 24 June came positive on 29 June. He was engaged in collecting scrap materials in Kottakkal.
24	76	Male	Thiruvananthapuram	Government Medical College, Thiruvananthapuram	Mumbai	Died on 27 June	A patient of who arrived from Mumbai on 27 June was soon admitted to the Intensive care unit at Government Medical College, Thiruvananthapuram after developing severe respiratory illness but died the same day. He also had diabetes and his swab samples were collected for the COVID-19 test and came positive on 30 June.
25	68	Male	Kozhikode	Not admitted	No	Died on 30 June	A man who hanged himself at his home in Vellayil tested positive for COVID-19 post his death. He was a security guard of a residential apartment at PT Usha Rd, Calicut.
26	82	Male	Malappuram	Government Medical College, Manjeri	Riyadh	Died on 5 July	A patient native to Chokkad who came from Riyadh on 29 June died at Government Medical College, Manjeri. He was a blood cancer patient and he was admitted to the hospital on 1 July following high fever.
27	63	Female	Thrissur	Government Medical College, Thrissur	No	Died on 5 July	A 63-year-old patient native of Arimpur who died on 5 July was confirmed COVID-19 positive on 12 July. She was brought to the Medical College Hospital in an unconscious state after having collapsed at home. Her daughter was in the primary contact list of a KSRTC bus conductor at the Guruvayur depot who had tested positive earlier.
28	68	Male	Ernakulam	Government Medical College, Ernakulam	No	Died on 5 July	A patient native to Thoppumpady who was under treatment at Government Medical College, Ernakulam since 28 June died on 5 July. He was undergoing treatment for diabetes for a long time and was admitted to the hospital after he was diagnosed with COVID-19 and had contracted pneumonia in his lungs. Then, the disease worsened and the kidney function was severely affected.
29	52	Male	Thrissur	Not admitted	No	Died on 7 July	COVID-19 test result confirmed the death of a man who collapsed in Kuttanad, Alappuzha. He died on 7 July. The result was positive in the PCR test. The health department found that he was a construction worker and had been in contact with a number of people. It is not clear where he got infected.
30	66	Male	Thiruvananthapuram	Government Medical College, Thiruvananthapuram	No	Died on 10 July	A patient native to Manikyapuram died at Government Medical College, Thiruvananthapuram on 10 July. He was also a diabetes patient. He was running a medical store in Poonthura, which has been announced as the 'Super Spread' region to COVID-19 since a large number of people has been contracted the virus through person-to-person transmission. Health officials believe that he got contracted the virus from any of his infected customers who came in contact with him.
31	79	Male	Ernakulam	Government Medical College, Ernakulam	No	Died on 10 July	A patient native to Pulluvazhy, who died on 10 July night, turned positive on 11 July. He had been admitted to MOSC Medical College at Kolencherry on Friday morning with high fever. His son works at the Kerala State Electricity Board (KSEB) office in Aluva and the health officials believe that the victim might have contracted the infection from him.
32	70	Male	Thiruvananthapuram	Government Medical College, Thiruvananthapuram	No	Died on 11 July	The patient who died at Government Medical College, Thiruvananthapuram on 11 July tested positive for the virus on 18 July.
33	59	Female	Idukki	undisclosed	No	Died on 12 July	The patient native to Rajakkad died of hear attack. She was admitted to a private hospital in Aluva following a chest pain and was in ventilator but died. She had tested positive to the virus ahead of a cardiac surgery.
34	71	Male	Kottayam	Government Medical College, Kottayam	No	Died on 13 July	The patient was native to Kanjirappally. He was an auto driver, it is not clear where he contracted the disease. He was undergoing treatment at the Government Medical College, Kottayam. He was also diagnosed with kidney disease and diabetes.
35	64	Female	Kannur	Government Medical College, Kannur	No	Died on 13 July	The patient native to Kunnothparamba died at Government Medical College, Kannur while undergoing treatment for cancer. It is believed that she might have contracted the virus from her husband who had been tested positive to COVID-19 from person-to-person transmission on the previous day and she had been in contact with him.
36	47	Male	Alappuzha	Government T D Medical College, Alappuzha	Riyadh	Died on 13 July	The patient native to Chunakkara had returned from Saudi Arabia on early July. He was a cancer patient and approached Government Medical College, Kottayam for cancer treatment. He was later referred to Government T D Medical College, Alappuzha. He had also approached the general medicine wing of the Alappuzha Medical College Hospital.
37	45	Male	Thrissur	Government Medical College, Thrissur	No	Died on 15 July	The patient native to Irinjalakuda, who died on 15 July tested positive for COVID-19 through True NAAT test on 17 July. He was admitted to Government Medical College, Thrissur due to fever and shortness of breath.
38	72	Female	Thiruvananthapuram	Government Medical College, Thiruvananthapuram	No	Died on 15 July	The patient native to Pulluvila, who died on 15 July at Government Medical College, Thiruvananthapuram tested positive for COVID-19 on 21 July.
39	24	Male	Kannur	Not admitted	Ahmedabad	Died on 16 July	The patient native to Kariyad had arrived to the state from Ahmedabad, Gujarat on late June. He died while undergoing his quarantine protocol periods.
40	38	Male	Thrissur	Government Medical College, Thrissur	Chennai	Died on 16 July	The patient native to Guruvayur had arrived from Chennai on 25 June died at Government Medical College, Thrissur. He was quarantined at a private Hotel in Guruvayur for 14 days. He then spent 14 days at home in quarantine, where he felt unwell. He was rushed to hospital but died later.
41	60	Male	Thiruvananthapuram	Government Medical College, Thiruvananthapuram	Yes	Died on 16 July	The patient who died at Government Medical College, Thiruvananthapuram on 16 July tested positive for the virus on 18 July.
42	73	Female	Ernakulam	Not admitted	No	Died on 16 July	The patient died on 16 July at SD Convent in Ernakulam tested positive for the virus on 20 July. She was a cardiac and diabetes patient.
43	74	Female	Kasargod	Government Medical College, Kannur	No	Died on 17 July	The patient native to Uppala died of Covid-triggered complications on 17 July. She tested positive on July 11. However, health officials and family members disagree on the source of infection. She and her daughter-in-law were shifted to the district hospital in Kanhangad after testing positive. She developed pulmonary complication and was shifted to Medical College Hospital at Pariyaram in Kannur. She was also a diabetic patient.
44	67	Male	Ernakulam	Government Medical College, Ernakulam	No	Died on 19 July	The patient is a resident of Veliyathunad in Karumalloor panchayat died at Government Medical College, Ernakulam on 19 July. He was undergoing treatment for COVID-19 at Government Medical College, Ernakulam from 8 July. He was diagnosed with high blood pressure and diabetics. Following his health condition getting worse, he was provided with ventilator support, but died.
45	75	Male	Idukki	Government Medical College, Kottayam	Theni	Died on 20 July	The patient native to Ayyappancoil was in Theni, Tamil Nadu with his son at a relative's house, came back to Ayyappancoil on 15 July. While the duo was undergoing home quarantine, he showed symptoms of fever and his swab samples were collected for testing a few days back. When his test results were found to be positive on 20 July, he was shifted to the Idukki Medical College Hospital. Later, his condition worsened due to breathing difficulties and he was shifted to the Government Medical College, Kottayam, died few hours after.
46	73	Male	Thiruvananthapuram	Government Medical College, Thiruvananthapuram	No	Died on 20 July	The patient is a native to Parassala.
47	79	Female	Idukki	Private Hospital, Ernakulam	No	Died on 20 July	The patient native to Thodupuzha was undergoing treatment at a private hospital for kidney ailment. She died on 20 July and tested positive for the virus on 20 July.
48	79	Female	Kollam	Government Medical College, Kollam	No	Died on 21 July	The patient died on 21 July and tested positive for the virus on 23 July.
49	60	Male	Kannur	Government Medical College, Kannur	No	Died on 21 July	The patient native to Thrippangottur died on 21 July and tested positive for the virus on 23 July. He was admitted to Pariyaram Medical College Hospital for a cardiac arrest. He was also under treatment for cancer.
50	57	Male	Kozhikode	Government Medical College, Kozhikode	No	Died on 22 July	The patient native to Kallayi was admitted to Government Medical College, Kozhikode on 20 July after he tested positive for the virus on 19 July. He had contact with other COVID-positive patients.
51	85	Female	Alappuzha	Government T D Medical College, Alappuzha	No	Died on 22 July	The patient is native to Kattoor died on 22 July and tested for the virus on 23 July. She was admitted to the hospital after experiencing shortness of breath. The disease was first confirmed to her daughter-in-law, an employee of a private lab.
52	85	Female	Kasargod	Government Medical College, Kannur	No	Died on 22 July	The patient native to Anangoor was admitted to Pariyaram Medical College Hospital on 20 July, was on ventilator support. She had undergone treatment for pneumonia at a private hospital in Kasaragod. She was tested positive while at Kasaragod and was shifted to the medical college.
53	65	Female	Ernakulam	Government Medical College, Ernakulam	No	Died on 22 July	The patient native of Vazhakulam was tested positive for COVID-19 on 30 July.
54	68	Male	Kasargod	Government Medical College, Kannur	No	Died on 23 July	The patient native to Thannott is suspected that the virus might be transferred from a medical college. He was admitted to a private hospital in Kanhangad, was admitted to Pariyaram Medical College on 29 June due to a liver ailment. He returned home on 6 July after receiving treatment.
55	44	Male	Thiruvananthapuram	Government Medical College, Thiruvananthapuram	No	Died on 23 July	The patient was a native to Chirayinkeezhu.
56	58	Male	Kozhikode	Government Medical College, Kozhikode	No	Died on 23 July	The patient was under quarantine after he came in contact with a COVID-19 patient. He was under treatment for high blood pressure and diabetes. Though he was taken to the medical college, he died on 23 July.
57	67	Female	Kozhikode	Government Medical College, Kozhikode	No	Died on 23 July	The patient native to Karaparamba, who had high blood pressure and asthma, died on 24 July. The next day, her daughter, who was suffering from cancer, also died.
58	76	Female	Ernakulam	Government Medical College, Ernakulam	No	Died on 24 July	The patient's swab who died on 24 July was taken and the results of her sample on 25 July showed that she tested positive for the virus. She was an inmate of the Karunalayam care home and convent at Thrikkakara.
59	82	Male	Kottayam	Government Medical College, Kottayam	No	Died on 24 July	The patient native to Chungam, was bedridden for quite some time following a fall.
60	59	Male	Ernakulam	Government Medical College, Ernakulam	No	Died on 24 July	The patient native to Edathala was undergoing treatment at the Kalamassery Medical College Hospital for the past few days. Though plasma therapy was tried, doctors were unable to save his life. His test result came post his death on 31 July.
61	75	Female	Kasargod	Pariyaram Medical College	No	Died on 25 July	The patient native to Padanakkad died at Pariyaram Medical College on 25 July. She had visited the Kanhangad District Hospital after experiencing extreme respiratory issues. She was diabetic and was additionally taking medicines for thyroid issues. She examined optimistic for COVID-19 virus after her swab was collected when she arrived right here for therapy. Later, her situation deteriorated as she was identified with Pneumonia and was referred to the Medical faculty in Kannur. However, her physique oxygen ranges dropped drastically.
62	40	Female	Palakkad	District Hospital, Palakkad	Tiruppur	Died on 25 July	The patient native to Kollengode was taken to the hospital after she collapsed in the bathroom on 26 July. She had returned from Tirupur with her son on his motorbike. She collapsed on the same day her quarantine period was supposed to end. In the test that was followed, she was diagnosed COVID positive.
63	71	Male	Thrissur	Government Medical College, Thrissur	No	Died on 26 July	The patient native to Irinjalakuda was undergoing treatment at Government Medical College, Thrissur. He was admitted with COVID-19 symptoms at the hospital on 17 July. He was a retired KSEB employee.
64	71	Male	Malappuram	Government Medical College, Manjeri	No	Died on 26 July	The patient native to Tirurangadi died at Government Medical College, Manjeri on 26 July. He was a diabetic. He was confirmed of the virus on 19 July. He was shifted to the ventilator on 21 July after his condition turned worse. His source of the infection is unknown.
65	61	Male	Malappuram	Government Medical College, Kozhikode	No	Died on 26 July	The patient native to Pookkottumpadam died at the Government Medical College, Kozhikode. He was tested positive for COVID-19 on 24 July. However, he died due to kidney failure.
66	70	Male	Kasargod	Pariyaram Medical College	No	Died on 26 July	The patient native to Kumbla, was a heart patient. He died while undergoing treatment at Pariyaram Medical College. He was under treatment at a private hospital in Kasargod following serious health issues.
67	72	Male	Alappuzha	Government T D Medical College, Alappuzha	No	Died on 26 July	The patient native of Kollakadavu, was diagnosed with COVID-19 during a private hospital examination. He was later shifted to Vandanam Medical College 26 July. He was rushed to the ICU after suffering a heart attack and died in the evening.
68	59	Male	Thrissur	Government Medical College, Thrissur	No	Died on 26 July	The patient native to was Irinjalakuda was a lung cancer patient died on 26 July. He turned COVID positive in the test conducted after death on 1 August.
69	72	Male	Ernakulam	Private Hospital, Kochi	No	Died on 27 July	The patient native to Kunnathunad, who was admitted for COVID-19 in a private hospital in Kochi, died on 27 July. He was diagnosed with a severe heart problem, said hospital authorities.
70	65	Male	Thiruvananthapuram	Government Medical College, Thiruvananthapuram	No	Died on 27 July	The patient native of Kanyakumari died on 27 July.
71	56	Female	Kollam	Government Medical College, Kollam	No	Died on 28 July	The patient native of Koivila, who died on 28 July, tested positive for COVID-19 on 29 July. She was an employee of a private nursing college and had been undergoing treatment for heart problems.
72	67	Male	Malappuram	Government Medical College, Manjeri	No	Died on 29 July	The patient native of Chelari, was undergoing treatment at the Intensive Care Unit (ICU) in Government Medical College, Manjeri. He was earlier admitted to a private hospital in Kozhikode on July 24 following severe fever. Subsequent tests revealed that he was COVID-19 positive and he was admitted to the Government Medical College, Manjeri on 25 July. He was also suffering from diabetes, high blood pressure and heart-related ailments.
73	82	Male	Malappuram	Government Medical College, Manjeri	No	Died on 29 July	The patient native to Peruvallur was constantly taking medication for diabetes, high blood pressure, respiratory diseases and Alzheimer's disease. He was admitted to the Intensive Care Unit (ICU) of Government Medical College, Manjeri on 29 July after suffering severe shortness of breath. He was transferred to ICU the same day after he confirmed his COVID-19.
74	49	Male	Kozhikode	Government Medical College, Kozhikode	No	Died on 29 July	The patient native of Kozhikode Beach was taken to beach hospital on 26 July with respiratory problems and coughing. He tested COVID-19 positive in the test taken after admission. A medical bulletin said adding he also suffered from severe left ventricular dysfunction, coronary artery disease, chronic kidney disease and diabetes.
75	73	Female	Kollam	Government Medical College, Kollam	No	Died on 29 July	The patient native to Kottarakkara was under treatment in Kollam worsened and died when she was being shifted to Government Medical College, Kollam.
76	68	Female	Thiruvananthapuram	Government Medical College, Thiruvananthapuram	No	Died on 29 July	The patient native to Parassala died at Government Medical College, Thiruvananthapuram on 29 July. Her swab were taken for test and came positive for the COVID-19 on 2 August.
77	77	Male	Kozhikode	Government Medical College, Kozhikode	No	Died on 30 July	The patient native of Pallikandy, died at the Government Medical College, Kozhikode early on 30 July. He had comorbidities including cardiac disease. He was admitted to Government Medical College, Kozhikode on 24 July and was on a ventilator.
78	85	Female	Ernakulam	Government Medical College, Ernakulam	No	Died on 30 July	The patient native to Thrippunithura was admitted with COVID pneumonia at Ernakulam medical college, Kalamassery. She died on 30 July.
79	53	Male	Ernakulam	Government Medical College, Ernakulam	No	Died on 31 July	The patient native of Aluva, who was undergoing treatment for the virus at Government Medical College, Ernakulam, died on 31 July. He was also suffering from diabetes and blood pressure.
80	80	Female	Ernakulam	Government Medical College, Ernakulam	No	Died on 31 July	The patient was a nun staying at St Theresa's convent in Koonammavu died at the Government Medical College, Ernakulam. She was also suffering from blood pressure and cholesterol.
81	69	Male	Kasargod	Government Medical College, Kannur	No	Died on 31 July	The patient was a copra merchant at Kaikkottukadav in Trikaripur panchayat died of COVID-19 early on 31 July. Four employees of his shop have also tested positive for COVID-19. He died while being taken to Pariyaram medical college. His fluid test was performed at Kanhangad district hospital. However, the test result came post his death only.
82	62	Male	Thiruvananthapuram	Government Medical College, Thiruvananthapuram	No	Died on 31 July	The patient native to Nedumangad died at Government Medical College, Thiruvananthapuram on 31 July. However, the test result of his COVID-19 virus came post his death on 1 August.
83	82	Female	Ernakulam	Government Medical College, Ernakulam	No	Died on 31 July	The patient was a prominent socialist leader and a native of Thrikkakara. He was admitted to the hospital three days ago due to age-related illnesses. He was the Ernakulam district president of the Janata Party for a long time.
84	51	Female	Kasargod	Government Medical College, Kannur	No	Died on 31 July	The patient native to Manjeshwar died at Government Medical College, Kannur 31 July. Her swabs tested positive for the virus post his death on 6 August.
85	68	Male	Thiruvananthapuram	Government Medical College, Thiruvananthapuram	No	Died on 1 August	the patient native to Neyyattinkara was admitted to the medical college following chest pain on 31 July, died on 1 August. The COVID test conducted after his death turned positive of the virus infection on 3 August.
86	53	Male	Thiruvananthapuram	Government Medical College, Thiruvananthapuram	No	Died on 1 August	The patient native to Kalliyode died at Government Medical College, Thiruvananthapuram on 1 August. On the 26 July, he sought treatment at the Sneha Hospital, Balaramapuram with symptoms such as fever, headache and shortness of breath. He was examined at NIMS Medicity on the 31 July and was later shifted to the Intensive Care Unit of the Government Medical College, Thiruvananthapuram.
87	45	Male	Kozhikode	Government Medical College, Kozhikode	No	Died on 1 August	The patient native to Peruvayal died at Government Medical College, Kozhikode on 1 August. His swabs were collected for the COVID-19 test on the same day and tested positive for the virus on 4 August.
88	66	Male	Kozhikode	Government Medical College, Kozhikode	No	Died on 1 August	The patient native to Chombala died at Government Medical College, Kozhikode on 1 August. However, his test result came positive on 3 August.
89	76	Male	Kasargod	Government Medical College, Kannur	No	Died on 1 August	The patient native to Udumbunthala tested positive for the virus on 28 July, shifted to Government Medical College, Kannur, died on 1 August.
90	69	Male	Ernakulam	Government Medical College, Ernakulam	No	Died on 2 August	The patient native to Kuttamassery died at Government Medical College, Ernakulam on 2 August. He was being treated for two weeks after contracting the disease. He has already undergone heart surgery.
91	52	Male	Alappuzha	Government T D Medical College, Alappuzha	No	Died on 2 August	The patient native to Nooranad died at Government T D Medical College, Alappuzha on 2 August. His swabs were collected for the COVID-19 test on the same day and tested positive for the virus on 3 August.
92	73	Male	Kozhikode	Government Medical College, Kozhikode	No	Died on 2 August	The patient native to Feroke died while in treatment at Government Medical College, Kozhikode on 2 August. His COVID-19 test result came positive on 3 August.
93	73	Female	Kasargod	Government Medical College, Kannur	No	Died on 2 August	The patient native to Uppala was admitted to the Government Medical College, Kannur after testing positive for the virus on 30 July, died on 2 August.
94	70	Male	Kozhikode	Government Medical College, Kozhikode	No	Died on 3 August	The patient native to Kakkattil had a heart condition. He was being treated at a private hospital in Kozhikode for a few days. He was then shifted to Government Medical College, Kozhikode due to acute illness.
95	58	Male	Kollam	Government Medical College, Kollam	No	Died on 3 August	The patient native to Velinalloor died at Government Medical College, Kollam on 3 August.
96	59	Female	Kannur	Government Medical College, Kannur	No	Died on 3 August	The patient native to Irikkur was admitted to the Government Medical College, Kannur after testing positive for the virus on 23 July, died on 3 August.
97	63	Male	Thiruvananthapuram	Government Medical College, Thiruvananthapuram	No	Died on 5 August	The patient native to Vizhinjam died at Government Medical College, Thiruvananthapuram on 5 August.
