= Kelunairpady =

Village in Kerala, India

Kelunairpady is a location in Chokkad, Malappuram district, Kerala, India.

Kelunairpady is one of the best environmental-exotic place in Malappuram district. It is full of mountains, mountain valleys and mountain waterfalls.

The name 'Kelunairpady' was derived from a person named Kelu nair. He was the richest and chief person of that village.

Kelunairpadi is approximately 19 km north of Nilambur town in Ooty Perumbilavu state highway. The village has witnessed lot of historic events like 'Mappila Lahala' or Malabar riots during 1921. Major occupation of people are rubber tapping, farming etc. Lot of Christian farmers migrated to this place in the late 1960s. Pullengode government higher secondary school is the school for almost 2500 students in that village.

== Culture ==
Kelunairpady village is a predominantly Muslim populated area. Hindus exist in comparatively smaller numbers. So the culture of the locality is based upon Muslim traditions. Duff Muttu, Kolkali and Aravanamuttu are common folk arts of this locality. There are many libraries attached to mosques giving a rich source of Islamic studies. Most of the books are written in Arabi-Malayalam which is a version of the Malayalam language written in Arabic script. People gather in mosques for the evening prayer and continue to sit there after the prayers discussing social and cultural issues. Business and family issues are also sorted out during these evening meetings. The Hindu minority of this area keeps their rich traditions by celebrating various festivals in their temples. Hindu rituals are done here with a regular devotion like other parts of Kerala.

== Transportation ==
Kelunairpadi village connects to other parts of India through Nilambur town. State Highway No.28 starts from Nilambur and connects to Ooty, Mysore and Bangalore through Highways 12, 29 and 181. National highway No.66 passes through Ramanattukara and the northern stretch connects to Goa and Mumbai. The southern stretch connects to Cochin and Trivandrum. State. The nearest airport is at Kozhikode. The nearest major railway station is at Feroke.

One of Best Family of kelunair Pady is kooriyil house. They are the old inhabitants of the village.
