= Arimpur =

- village
- Location in Kerala, India Arimpur (India)
- Coordinates: 10°29′0″N 76°8′0″E
- Country: India
- State: Kerala
- District: Thrissur

Languages
  - Official: Malayalam, English
- Time zone: UTC+5:30 (IST)
- PIN: 680620

Arimpur is a small village located in Thrissur District of Kerala, India.
