= Pulluvazhy =

Pulluvazhi
- village
- Location in Kerala, India Pulluvazhi (India)
- Coordinates: 10.087854°N 76.508789°E
- Country: India
- State: Kerala
- District: Ernakulam
- Time zone: UTC+5:30 (IST)
- PIN: 683541
- Vehicle registration: KL- 40
- Coastline: 0 kilometres (0 mi)
- Nearest city: Perumbavoor
- Literacy: 100%%
- Lok Sabha constituency: Chalakkudy
- Climate: Tropical monsoon (Köppen)
- Avg. summer temperature: 35 °C (95 °F)
- Avg. winter temperature: 20 °C (68 °F)
- Website: pulluvazhy.com

Pulluvazhi is a small village in Rayamangalam Grama panchayat in the Ernakulam district of Kerala state, India. It is close to the towns Perumbavoor, Muvattupuzha and Kothamangalam.

Pulluvazhi is the birthplace of many people representatives in the Kerala legislature. K.G .Rohithakshan Kartha (KGR Kartha), represented Seventh Kerala Legislative Assembly as Minister for Health; Communist Party veteran and former Chief Editor of Deshabhimani, P. Govinda Pillai, well known educationalist Rev K.C. Paily were born in Pulluvazhy. Padayatt Kesavapillai Vasudevan Nair (PKV), the 9th Chief Minister of Kerala also had firm connections in this village and his memorial service had performed here. Famous Nangelil Ayurvedic Marmma Therapy Doctors are from Pulluvazhi. Sister Rani Maria Vattalil, also known as Indore Rani, the martyr philanthropist was also born in this village. The writer and social critique M.P. Narayana Pillai, Communist Party veteran S.Sivasankara Pillai(Edappally Sivan), P.R. Sivan, former MLA and renowned drama director Kalady Gopi were also from Pulluvazhy.

Pulluvazhi is known for its unity against Hartal, a common strike practice in India by affecting work, travel and commercial activity etc. Pulluvazhy gave mere importance to this strike and never supported any kind of such strike. The shops and businesses generally remain open in a Harthal Day, and serves travellers passing through the area as the village is besides Airport-Kottayam MC Road. The only two occasions when the village had downed shutters were when Communist leaders P. Govinda Pillai, P K V and P.R. Sivan died.

Currently, the village is famous for timber business.

== Population ==
- Population: 25,691
- Males: 12,841
- Females: 12,850
- Number of Households: 5,928

== Landmarks ==
=== Temples ===
- Kuttikkattu Mahadeva Temple
- Nangelil Bhagavathy Temple
- Koottumadom Sree Subramanya swami Temple
- Perakkattu Sree Mahadeva Temple

=== Churches ===
- St. Thomas Catholic Church Pulluvazhy. A pilgrim station. Most attractions are St. Antony's Chapel and Sr Rani Maria Museum.
- Mar Gregorious Jacobite Syrian Chapel

Ashram

- Mata Amritanandamayi Math

=== Colleges ===
- San Joe college of nursing

=== Schools ===
- Jayakeralam Higher Secondary School
- St. Joseph's Convent Senior Secondary English Medium School
- Lower Primary School
- Nirmala Kindergarten
