= Chokkad =

Chokkad chokkad
- Town
- Country: India
- State: Kerala
- District: Malappuram

Population
  - Total: 37,238

Languages
  - Official: Malayalam, English
- Time zone: UTC+5:30 (IST)

Chokkad is a town situated south-east of Nilambur in the Malappuram district of Kerala, India. The town is located off the state highway between Nilambur and Kalikavu.

== See also ==
- Kelunairpady
