= Government Medical College, Kannur =

Medical College in India

Coordinates: 12°4′26″N 75°17′38″E

- Type: Government
- Established: 1993; 33 years ago
- Affiliations: Kerala University of Health Sciences, NMC
- Principal: Prof. Dr.Sairu Philip
- Undergraduates: 100 Admission per year
- Postgraduates: 36 Admission per year
- Location: Pariyaram, Kerala, India
- Campus: 119 acres
- Administration: Department of Health and Family Welfare, Government of Kerala

Government Medical College Kannur, Pariyaram, or Pariyaram Medical College, was established in March 1993 at Pariyaram in Kannur district, Kerala state, India. It was the first medical college to be established under the cooperative sector in India and was then called Academy of Medical Sciences (ACME).

This is now a major medical center in the Malabar area. This serves Kannur district, Kasaragod district and parts of Kozhikode district and Wayanad district.

== History ==
The Pariyaram Medical College was a vision of Mr. M. V. Raghavan, Minister of Kerala.

== See also ==
- Parassinikkadavu Snake Park
