= NIMS Medicity =

Hospital in Kerala

NIMS Medicity (Noorul Islam Institute of Medical Science and Research Foundation) also known as NIMS Hospital is a 350-bed tertiary care super specialty hospital situated at Neyyattinkara, Thiruvananthapuram. It is the first initiative in healthcare by the 57-year-old Noorul Islam Educational trust. Nims Medicity was established in the year 2005. Apart from the super specialty hospital, Noorul Islam College of Dental Science and Noorul Islam College of Nursing are also situated at the Nims Medicity campus. Noorul Islam University located in Kumarakovil, Thuckalay, Kanyakumari District Tamil Nadu, India is the other major establishment of the Noorul Islam Educational Trust.

NIMS concentrates on the Super Specialty treatments like Cardiology and Cardiac Surgery, Nephrology and Renal Transplantation, Neurology, Neurosurgery, Haematology, Hepatology, advanced Gastro Interventions, Diagnostic and Therapeutic upper GI & lower GI endoscopic procedures including upper and lower GI bled management, polypectomies and therapeutic ERCP and capsule endoscopy services. Nims Medicity won the Times of India Excellence Award Asian Diaspora Achievers Award 2011. Dr Faizal Khan is in charge of the institution.
