= Government Medical College, Manjeri =

Medical college in Kerala, India

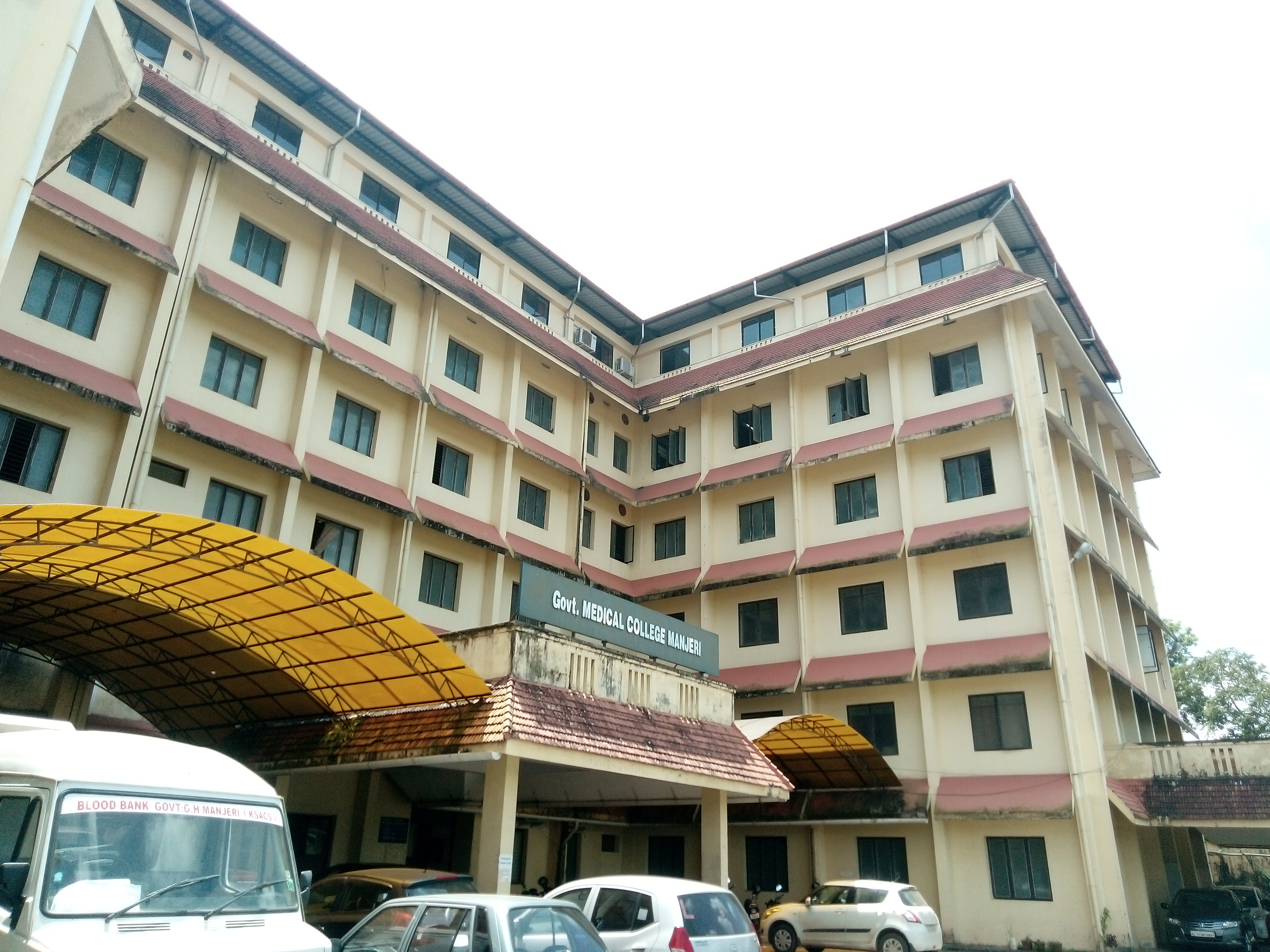
- Other name: GMC Manjeri
- Type: Government
- Established: September 1, 2013; 12 years ago
- Affiliations: Kerala University of Health Sciences
- Principal: Dr Anilraj K.K
- Location: Manjeri, Malappuram, Kerala, India; 11.11637°N 76.12100°E
- Administration: Department of Health and Family Welfare, Government of Kerala
- Website: www.govtmedicalcollegemanjeri.ac.in

Government Medical College, Manjeri, is a medical college established in Malappuram District affiliated to Kerala University of Health Sciences (KUHS), located in Manjeri around 12 kilometres (7.5 mi) from Malappuram. The hospital has 500 beds and 12 operation theatres with an intake of 110 students every year.

It is the sixth government medical college in the Kerala, inaugurated on 1 September 2013 by then Kerala Chief Minister Oommen Chandy and well facilitated by Kerala Chief Minister Pinarayi Vijayan since 2016. Manjeri Govt. Medical College is one among the newly sanctioned four medical colleges in Kerala. It was allowed for Malappuram district in revised 2011 state budget by Finance Minister K.M. Mani in July 2011.

== Progress ==
The new medical college is being set up by upgrading the 520-bedded General hospital at Manjeri. Land acquisition for additional space has been done few months back.

== How to reach ==
- By road: Nearest KSRTC bus station is at Up Hill, Malappuram. Plenty of buses ply between the station and the college. The nearest private bus stands are at Manjeri town.
- By rail: Nearest station is at Angadipuram located 22 km (14 mi) from the college
- By air: Karipur International Airport located in the district is 21 km (13 mi) from the college and is the nearest airport
