= Manikyapuram =

- Village
- Interactive map of Manikyapuram
- Location in Andhra Pradesh, India Manikyapuram (India)
- Coordinates: 18.951869°N 84.631325°E
- Country: India
- State: Andhra Pradesh
- District: Srikakulam
- Talukas: Kaviti

Languages
  - Official: Telugu
- Time zone: UTC+5:30 (IST)
- PIN: 532292
- Telephone code: 08947
- Vehicle registration: AP
- Lok Sabha constituency: Srikakulam
- Vidhan Sabha constituency: Ichchapuram

Manikyapuram is a village in Kaviti mandal, Srikakulam district of the Indian state of Andhra Pradesh.

Majority of population in this village speaks odiya and few Telugu . Manikyapuram is bordered by Kaviti mandal to the north, Kanchili and Sompeta mandals to the south, Odisha state to the west and the Bay of Bengal to the east.
