= Veliyathunad =

Village in Ernakulam District, Kerala, India

Veliyathunad is a village spread over Aluva Taluk and Paravur Taluk of Eranakulam district in the Indian state of Kerala. Veliyathunad is situated near Aluva town. Veliyathunad is one of rarest greenery sights in Eranakulam District: even though Veliyathunad people have all the benefits of a rural area they face few of the problems of other rural areas.

Veliyathunad is a part of Karumalloor panchayat and is situated 7 kilometers from Aluva Railway Station, 10 kilometers from North Paravur Bus Stand and 12 kilometers from Cochin International Airport. The village is bounded by distributaries of the Periyar river. It consists of large tracts of paddy fields and is mainly a rice-based agrarian economy. However, due to losses in paddy farming many farmers have recently changed to banana farms.

== Institutions ==
- Govt M.I.U.P School Veliyathunad
- The Alwaye Settlement H.S. School
- Jyothi Nivas Public School
- Muhammed Abdul Rahman Sahib Library
- Veliyathunad Post Office
- Govt. Ayurveda Dispensary
- Veliyathunad Co-operative Bank
- Janaseva Sisubhavan
- Welfare Association Trust
- Thanthra Vidya Peedham
- Carmelgiri St.Joseph Pontifical Seminary
- Kolbe Asramam
- Similia Homeo Lab
- Ice Station
- Govt Homoeo Dispensary
- Thomas Clinic Malikempeedika

== Localities ==
Parana, Thandirikkal, Aduvathuruth, Thadikkakadav, Cheriyath, Kadooppadam, Millupady, Vayalodam, Kanypady, Pallypadi, Madrassapady, Paruvakkad, Aattilpuzhakkav, Mariyappady, Vayalakkad, Parelipallam, Laksham Veedu, 4Cent, Societyppady, Mambra, Valliyappanpady

== Places of Worship ==
Churches

- St. Thomas Orthodox Syrian Church

Masjids

- Hidayathul Anam Madrassa & Masjid Madrassapady, Veliyathunad
- W. Veliyathunadu Jum'a Masjid
- E. Veliyathunadu Jum'a Masjid
- Kadoopadam Jum'a Masjid
- Thadikkakadav Jum'a Masjid
- Badriya Masjid, Aduvathuruth
- Salafi Masjid, Parana
- Arafa Masjid, parana
- Millupady Masjid
- Minarul Huda Masjid.
- Masjid Abdullah Khayath
- MasjidulRahma Vayalakad

Temples

- Aattippuzhakkav Bhagavathi Temple
- Cheriyath Narasimha Swamy Temple
- Vellam Bhagavathi Temple
- Mullakkal Temple
- Alungal Bhagavathi Temple
- Chirangara Temple
