= Udumbunthala =

Village in Kasargod District, Kerala, India

Udumbunthala is a small village located in Thrikaripur, in the Kasaragod district of Kerala in India.

== History ==
About 1000 years ago, this area was under sea. When Calamities occurred, many places and rivers appeared like Udumbunthala Kavayi river, Madakkal Island, Kadappuram Padincharan river, Kadappuram etc. Gradually some feudal rulers entered with so many workers in this area and landscaped for their dwellings and cultivation. After that, Families from Nalupurappattu invaded the places where Udumbunthala, Kaikottukadavu, Valvakkad and Madakkal. Brothers like Nalupurappattu Ibrahim Haji and Mohammed Kunchi Haji were ruled till their death.they devoted some of their lands to the masjid committees as Waqf.

== Transportation ==
Local roads have access to NH 66 which connects to Mangaluru in the north and Kozhikode in the south. The nearest railway station is Payyanur railway station at Payyanur on the Mangaluru—Palakkad line. There are airports at Mangalore International Airport, Kannur International Airport and Calicut International Airport, nearest one is Kannur International Airport
