= Bible Society of India Telangana Auxiliary =

Religious organisation in India

- Abbreviation: BSI TS Auxiliary
- Formation: 2016
- Founded at: Secunderabad
- Type: Bible Society
- Legal status: Charitable trust
- Purpose: Literary
- Headquarters: Bangalore
- Location: Secunderabad
- Region served: Telangana
- Services: Raising contribution, translating, printing, distribution
- Official language: Lambadi, Telugu and Urdu
- Secretary General: Rev. John Basy Paul, CSI, M. Th. (Serampore))
- Main organ: India Bible Society of Trust Association
- Parent organisation: Bible Society of India
- Secessions: Bible Society of India Andhra Pradesh Auxiliary
- Affiliations: United Bible Societies
- Budget: Rs.1.10,00,000.00 (2014)
- Website: http://www.bsind.org/andhra_pradesh.html
- Formerly called: Bible Society of India Andhra Pradesh Auxiliary

The Bible Society of India Telangana Auxiliary is located in Secunderabad which was bifurcated from the erstwhile Andhra Pradesh Auxiliary on 2 February 2016.

This Auxiliary translated the Telugu and Lambadi versions of the Bible.

== Telugu version ==
In the Annual report of the British & Foreign Bible Society John Hay had undertaken the revision of the Telugu Bible (of Lyman Jewett?). In the same report, mention was made of the Secunderabad Branch.

In 1953, the Telugu Bible was revised from earlier version which had been translated by John Hay, Edward Pritchett, John Smith Wardlaw (1813-), James William Gordon, John Redmond Bacon and Dhanavada Anantam.

Rev. A. B. Masilamani who majored in Greek at Serampore College was Auxiliary Secretary as well part of the Translation Team providing stylistic corrections in Telugu. Modern translations of the Telugu Bible in common language were taken up by Rev. Victor Premasagar and Rev. G. Babu Rao, both of whom were Scholars of Biblical Hebrew and Biblical Greek as well as colleagues at the Protestant Regional Theologiate in Secunderabad.

During the Auxiliary Secretaryship of Rev. B. G. Prasada Rao, a team consisting of Rev. Suppogu Israel and Rev. G. Babu Rao began translating portions of the Bible into modern Telugu which included,

- Portions translated into modern Telugu
  - Book of Ruth, 1976
  - Man You Cannot Ignore, 1976

The Old Testament Scholar, Dr. Graham S. Ogden, Asia-Pacific Regional Translations Coordinator of the United Bible Societies used to liaise with the Auxiliary during the Secretaryship of L. Prakasam, providing scholarly inputs and also reviewing the progress of the Telugu-Old Testament Common Language Project Coordinator, Rev. G. Babu Rao.

A Living Bible in Telugu was also proposed as early as 1980

== Lambadi version ==
In 2001, the Lambadi version translated by B. E. Devaraj was released.

== Auxiliary formation and Secretaries ==
The present Auxiliary was bifurcated on 2 February 2016 from the Bible Society of India Andhra Pradesh Auxiliary and on 5 June 2016, a new Auxiliary Secretary was appointed hailing from the Protestant Regional Theologiate, that is, the Andhra Christian Theological College, which had by then had been a source of translators for earlier revisions of the Bible comprising B. E. Devaraj, CSI, Muriel Spurgeon-Carder, CBCNC, Victor Premasagar, CSI, K. David, CBCNC and G. Babu Rao, CBCNC, who also served as Auxiliary Secretary for the earlier Bible Society of India Andhra Pradesh Auxiliary encompassing the present two Telugu states of Telangana and Andhra Pradesh.

=== Administrators since beginning ===
| Tenure | Auxiliary Secretaries at Bible House, Secunderabad (Since undivided Andhra Pradesh to present Telangana) | Earned Academic Credentials |
| 1953-1963 | The Rev. E. Prakasam, AELC | L. Th. (Serampore) |
| 1963-1969 | The Rev. A. B. Masilamani, CBCNC | L. Th. (Serampore), B. D. (Serampore), M. A. (Calcutta), Th. M. (Toronto), Ph. D. (Osmania) |
| 1969-1976 | The Rev. B. G. Prasada Rao, CSI | B. D. (Serampore), M. Th. (Serampore) |
| 1976-1981 | The Rev. T. B. D. Prakasa Rao, CSI | B. A. (Andhra), B. D. (Serampore), M. A. (Osmania), B. Ed. (Andhra) |
| 1981-1998 | The Rev. L. Prakasam, CBCNC | L. Th. (Serampore) |
| 1998-2001 | The Rev. G. Babu Rao, CBCNC | B. Sc. (Andhra),^{Double majors in Mathematics} B. D. (Serampore), M. Th. (Serampore) |
| 2001-2012 | The Rev. N. L. Victor, SA | B. A. |
| 2012-2016 | The Rev. B. S. Rajashekar, STBC | B. Com. (Nagarjuna), B. D. (Serampore), M. Th. (Serampore)^{Double Masters} |
| 2016-2018 | The Rev. P. K. Praveen Prabhu Sudheer, CSI | B. Com. (Osmania), B. D. (Serampore), M. Th. (Serampore), Ph. D. (Madras) |
| 2018-present | The Rev. John Basy Paul, CSI | B. Sc. (Kakatiya), B. D. (Serampore), M. A. (Kakatiya), M. Th., (PThU), M. Th. (Serampore) |
