= Ichchapuram Assembly constituency =

Constituency of the Andhra Pradesh Legislative Assembly, India

Coordinates: 19.11°N 84.69°E

Ichchapuram
- Constituency No. 1 for the Andhra Pradesh Legislative Assembly
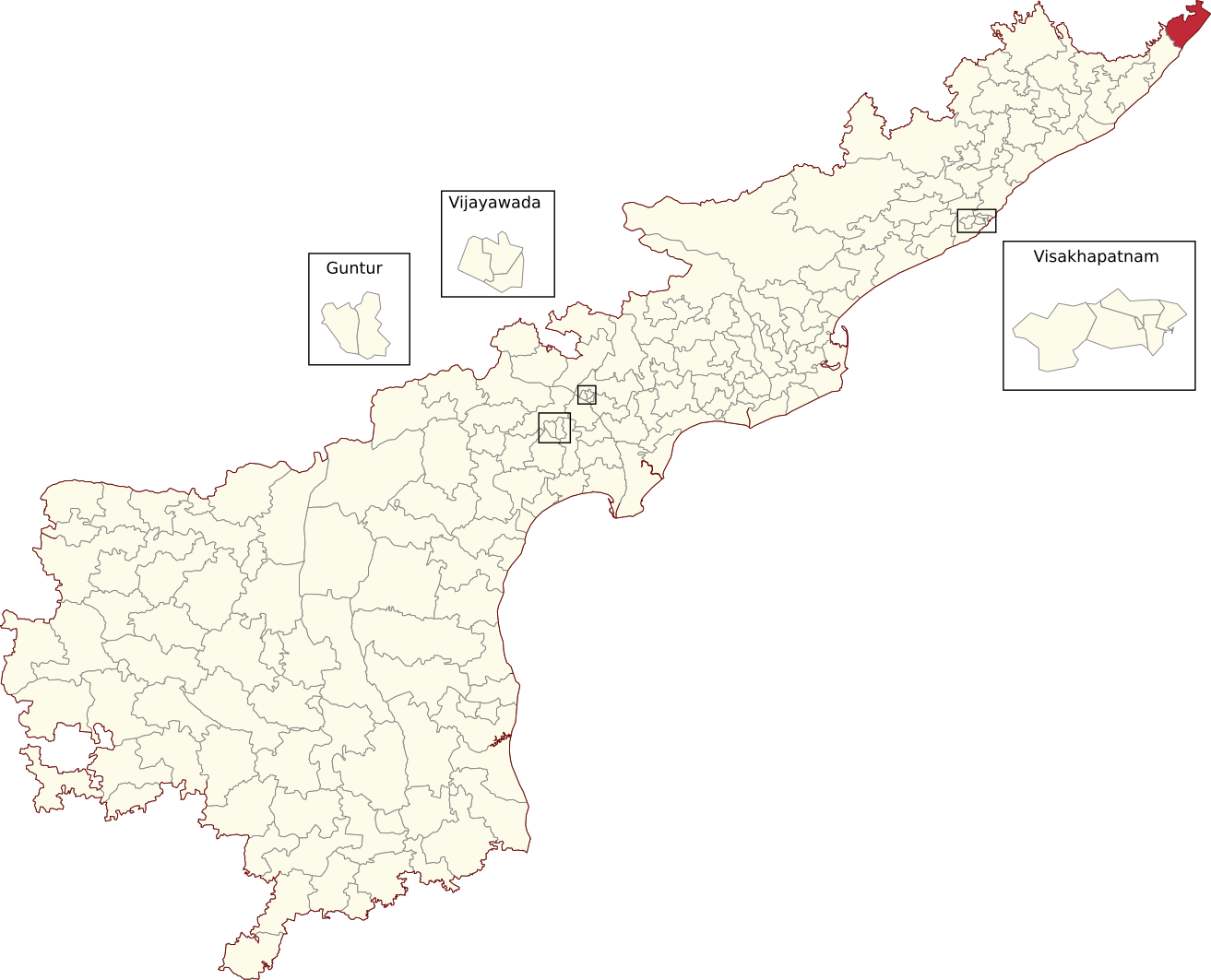
- Location of Ichchapuram Assembly constituency within Andhra Pradesh

Constituency details
- Country: India
- Region: South India
- State: Andhra Pradesh
- District: Srikakulam
- Lok Sabha constituency: Srikakulam
- Established: 1951
- Total electors: 246,228
- Reservation: None

Member of Legislative Assembly
- 16th Andhra Pradesh Legislative Assembly
- Incumbent Ashok Bendalam
- Party: TDP
- Alliance: NDA
- Elected year: 2024

Ichchapuram Assembly constituency is a constituency in Srikakulam district of Andhra Pradesh that elects representatives to the Andhra Pradesh Legislative Assembly in India. It is one of the seven assembly segments of Srikakulam Lok Sabha constituency.

Most Successful parties from Ichchapuram Assembly
1. TDP (9 Times) (56.2%)
2. INC (3 Times) (18.8%)
3. KLP (2 times) (12.5%)
4. Others (2 Times) (12.5%)

Ashok Bendalam is the current MLA of the constituency, having won the 2024 Andhra Pradesh Legislative Assembly election from Telugu Desam Party. As of 2019, there are a total of 246,228 electors in the constituency. The constituency was established in 1951, as per the Delimitation Orders (1951).

== Mandals ==
The four mandals that form the assembly constituency are:

Mandals
Kanchili
Ichchapuram
Kaviti
Sompeta

Mandals in Ichchapuram Assembly constituency

== Members of the Legislative Assembly ==
Following is the list of members who have been elected from the constituency to the Andhra Pradesh Legislature till date.

Year	Member	Political party
1952	Asi Neeladri Reddy	Krishikar Lok Party
1955	Uppada Rangababu Reddy	Krishikar Lok Party
1962	Kirti Chandra Deo	Indian National Congress
1967	L. K. Reddy	Swatantra Party
1972	Uppada Rangababu Reddy	Indian National Congress
1978	Bendalam Venkateswara Sharma	Janata Party
1983	M. V. Krishnarao	Telugu Desam Party
1985	M. V. Krishnarao	Telugu Desam Party
1989	M. V. Krishnarao	Telugu Desam Party
1994	Dakkata Achuta Ramayya Reddy	Telugu Desam Party
1999	M. V. Krishnarao	Telugu Desam Party
2004	Naresh Kumar Agarwal	Indian National Congress
2009	Piriya Sairaj	Telugu Desam Party
2014	Ashok Bendalam	Telugu Desam Party
2019	Ashok Bendalam	Telugu Desam Party
2024	Ashok Bendalam	Telugu Desam Party

== Election results ==
=== 1955 ===
1955 Andhra State Legislative Assembly election: Ichchapuram
Party	Candidate	Votes	%	±%
KLP	Uppada Rangababu	14,565	66.28	▲41.57
Independent	Harihara Patnaik	7,408	33.71	New
Majority		7,157	N/A	
Turnout		21,973	N/A	N/A
KLP hold		Swing		

=== 1962 ===
1962 Andhra Pradesh Legislative Assembly election: Ichchapuram
Party	Candidate	Votes	%	±%
INC	Kirti Deo	21,677	63.37	New
SWA	Dakkata Pitambaru	12,527	36.62	New
Majority		9,150	26.75	▼10.9
Turnout		34,204	N/A	N/A
INC gain from KLP		Swing		

=== 1967 ===
1967 Andhra Pradesh Legislative Assembly election: Ichchapuram
Party	Candidate	Votes	%	±%
SWA	L.K. Reddy	26,571	53.24	▲16.62
INC	K. Deo	20,138	40.35	▼23.02
Independent	A. K. Reddy	3,201	6.41	New
Majority		6,433	12.89	
Turnout		49,910	76.08	
SWA gain from INC		Swing		

=== 1972 ===
1972 Andhra Pradesh Legislative Assembly election: Ichchapuram
Party	Candidate	Votes	%	±%
INC	Uppada Rangababu	26,956	52.38	▲12.03
SWA	Bendalam V. Sharma	24,503	47.62	▼5.62
Majority		2,453	4.76	−8.13
Turnout		51,459	72.56	▼3.52
INC gain from SWA		Swing		

=== 1978 ===
1978 Andhra Pradesh Legislative Assembly election: Ichchapuram
Party	Candidate	Votes	%	±%
JP	Bendalam Sharma	34,251	56.1	
INC	La::a Swarmy	19,805	32.5	New
INC	Uppada Rangababu	4,427	7.3	
Independent	Appadu Sahu	1,743	2.9	{New
Independent	Manabala Ramarao	813	1.3	New
Majority		14,446	23.6	
Turnout		62,585	75.2	▲2.64
JP gain from INC		Swing		

=== 1983 ===
1983 Andhra Pradesh Legislative Assembly election: Ichchapuram
Party	Candidate	Votes	%	±%
TDP	M.V. Krishna Rao	28,168	47.4	
INC	Labala Rao	19,062	32.1	▼0.4
LKD	Krishan Bodda	7,943	13.4	New
BJP	Krishnamurthy Potula	2,052	3.5	{New
Independent	Buddapu Chandramani	1,656	2.8	New
Independent	Rama Manbala	545	0.9	New
Majority		9,106	15.3	▼8.9
Turnout		60,835	71.0	▼4.2
TDP hold		Swing		

=== 1985 ===
1952 Madras Legislative Assembly election: Ichchapuram
Party	Candidate	Votes	%	±%
TDP	M.V. Krishnarao	47,333	77.9%	+30.5
INC	Rao Labala	11,965	19.7%	−12.4
Independent	Reddy Buddepu	872	1.4%	
Independent	Madina Ramarao	604	1.0%	
Margin of victory		35,368	58.2%	+42.9
Turnout		61,818	67.8%	−3.2
Registered electors		91,224		5,504
TDP hold		Swing		

=== 1989 ===
1989 Andhra Pradesh Legislative Assembly election: Ichchapuram
Party	Candidate	Votes	%	±%
TDP	M.V. Krishnarao	46,984	60.7	▼17.2
INC	Buddala Trinadha	30,485	39.4	▲19.7
Majority		16,499	21.3	−36.9
Turnout		80,924	69.8	▲2.00
TDP hold		Swing		

=== 1994 ===
1994 Andhra Pradesh Legislative Assembly election: Ichchapuram
Party	Candidate	Votes	%	±%
TDP	Dakkata Achuta	37,859	44.6	▼16.1
INC	Buddhala Trinadha	24,375	28.7	▼10.7
Independent	Rao Bendalam	19,635	23.1	New
BSP	Bisai Vedavara	1,091	1.3	{New
Independent	Kanababu Pullata	867	1.0	New
BJP	Rao Mohana	779	0.9	New
Independent	Ratnala Narayana	257	0.3	New
Majority		13,484	15.9	▼5.4
Turnout		86,875	72.6	▲2.8
TDP hold		Swing		

=== 1999 ===
1999 Andhra Pradesh Legislative Assembly election: Ichchapuram
Party	Candidate	Votes	%	±%
TDP	M. V. Krishnarao	44,633	51.6	▲7
INC	Kumar Naresh Agrawal	40,290	46.6	▲17.9
Anna Telugu Desam Party	Yadav Vasulu Kollo	1,624	1.9	New
Majority		4,343	5	▼10.9
Turnout		89,715	68.9	▼3.7
TDP hold		Swing		

=== 2004 ===
2004 Andhra Pradesh Legislative Assembly election: Ichchapuram
Party	Candidate	Votes	%	±%
INC	Naresh Kumar Agarwal	51,927	54.0	▲7.48
TDP	Yakambari Dakkata	44,182	46.0	▼5.60
Majority		7,745	8.1	
Turnout		96,109	73.5	▲7.05
INC gain from TDP		Swing	▲6.54	

=== 2009 ===
2009 Andhra Pradesh Legislative Assembly election: Ichchapuram
Party	Candidate	Votes	%	±%
TDP	Piriya Sairaj	45,277	33.2	▼12.8
INC	Narthu Ramarao	43,002	31.6	▼22.4
PRP	Nartu Seshagiri Rao	39,256	28.8	New
Majority		2,275	1.7	▼6.4
Turnout		1,36,222	73.1	▼0.4
TDP gain from INC		Swing	▲4.8	

=== 2014 ===
2014 Andhra Pradesh Legislative Assembly election: Ichchapuram
Party	Candidate	Votes	%	±%
TDP	Ashok Bendalam	86,815	54.2	▼21.0
YSRCP	Narthu Rama Rao	61,537	38.4	New
INC	Agarwal Naresh	6,582	4.1	▼27.5
Majority		25,278	15.7	▲14.0
Turnout		1,60,919	71.8	▼1.3
TDP hold		Swing		

=== 2019 ===
2019 Andhra Pradesh Legislative Assembly election: Ichchapuram
Party	Candidate	Votes	%	±%
TDP	Ashok Bendalam	79,992	47.5	▼6.7
YSRCP	Piriya sairaj	72,847	43.2	▲4.8
JSP	Dasari Raju	11,123	6.6	New
INC	Kolli Eshwar Rao	2138	1.24	▼2.9
BJP	J. S. V. Prasad	1826	1.1	New
NOTA	None of the Above	3880	2.25	
Majority		7,145	4.14	▼11.57
Turnout		1,68,543	69.6	▼2.2
TDP hold		Swing	▼5.75	

=== 2024 ===
2024 Andhra Pradesh Legislative Assembly election: Ichchapuram
Party	Candidate	Votes	%	±%
TDP	Ashok Bendalam	110,612	58.58	
YSRCP	Piriya Vijaya	70,829	37.51	
INC	Masupatri Chakravarthi Reddy	792	0.42	
NOTA	None of the above	4,374	2.32	
Majority		39,783	21.07	
Turnout		1,88,815		
TDP hold		Swing		

== See also ==
- List of constituencies of the Andhra Pradesh Legislative Assembly
