= Majhiputtuga =

- Village
- Interactive map of Majhiputtuga
- Location in Andhra Pradesh, India Majhiputtuga (India)
- Coordinates: 18.9545428°N 84.6221173°E
- Country: India
- State: Andhra Pradesh
- District: Srikakulam
- Mandal: Kanchili
- Panchayat: Talatampara

Languages
  - Official: Telugu ( తెలుగు )
- Time zone: UTC+5:30 (IST)
- Postal code: 532292
- Vehicle registration: AP 30

Majhiputtuga, also spelled as Majjiputtuga is a small village in Talatampara Panchayat in Kanchili mandal of Srikakulam district in Andhra Pradesh.
