= Telineelapuram and Telukunchi Bird Sanctuaries =

Bird sanctuaries in Andhra Pradesh, India

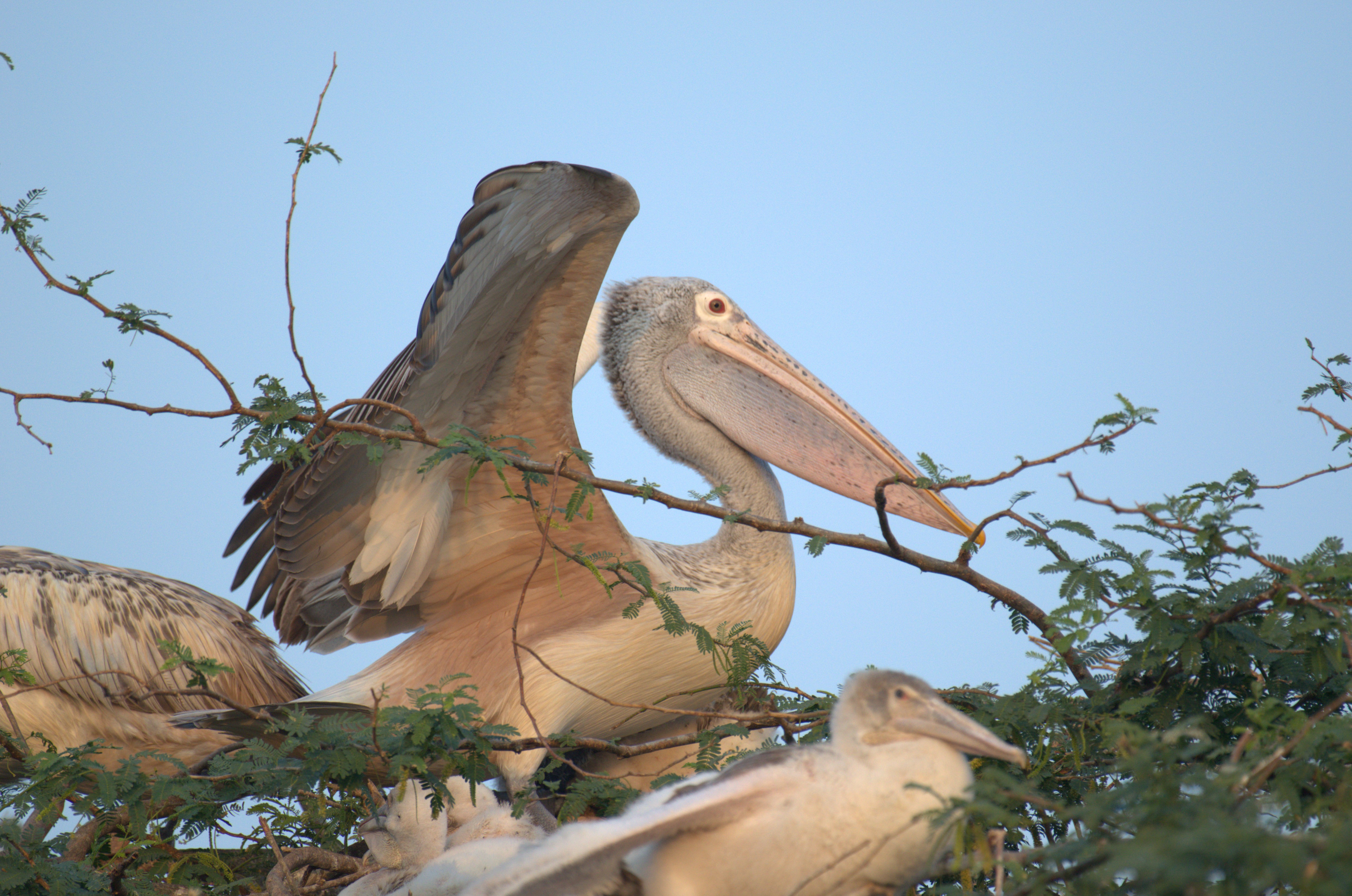
Spot-billed pelican (Pelecanus philippensis) at Telineelapuram Bird Sanctuary

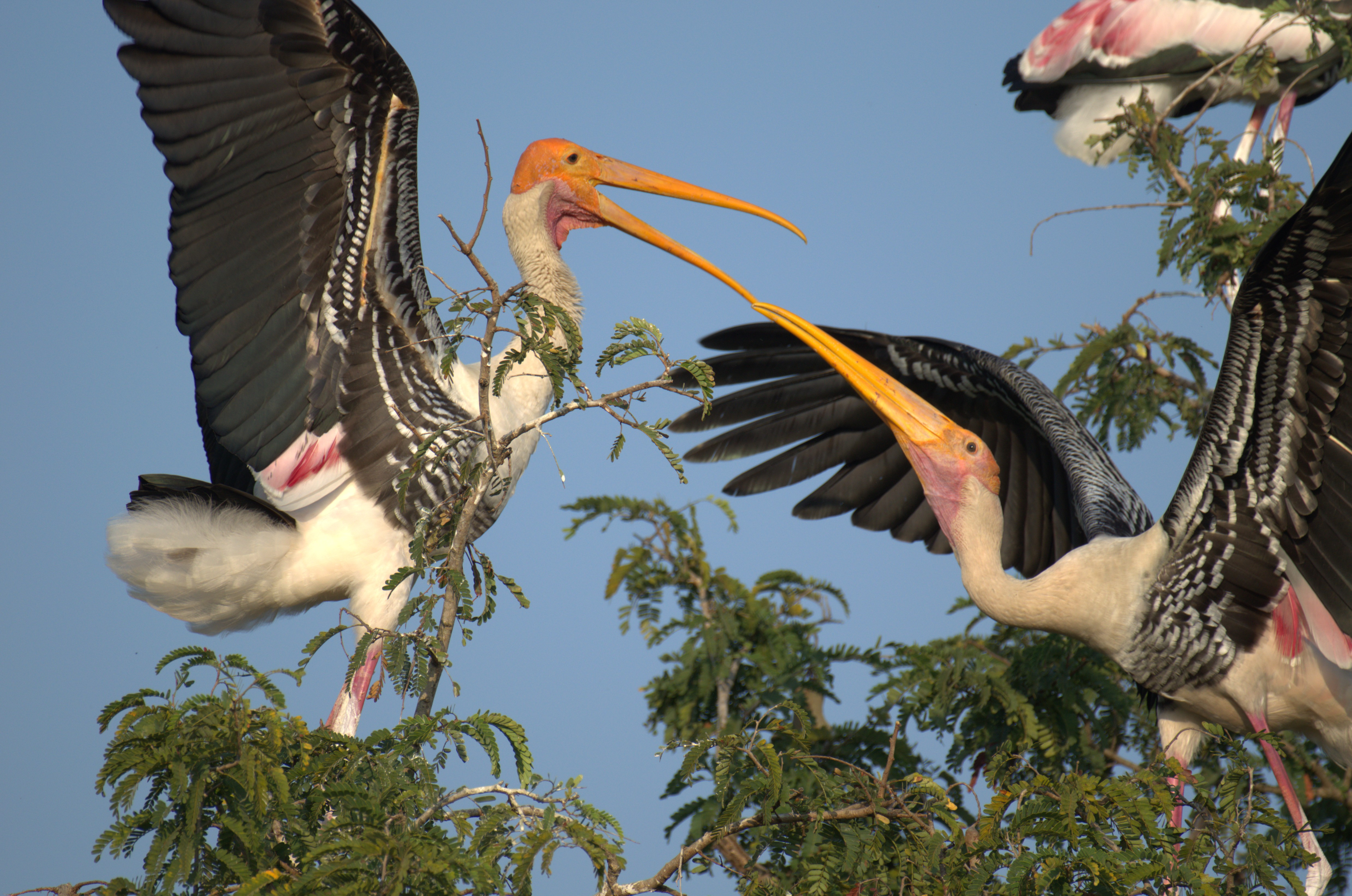
Painted storks (Mycteria leucocephala) at Telineelapuram Bird Sanctuary

Telineelapuram and Telukunchi Bird Sanctuaries are located in Srikakulam district of Andhra Pradesh, India. Telineelapuram is a village located 65 kilometres (40 mi) from Srikakulam in Tekkali mandal, while Telukunchi is at a distance of 115 kilometres (71 mi) from Srikakulam in Ichchapuram mandal. Every year, over 3,000 pelicans and painted storks visit from Siberia to these villages during September and stay on till March.

Researchers at Andhra University found that the migratory movement of birds was first noticed over 15 years ago, when the number of birds exceeded 10,000. At present, the figure has been reduced to about 3,000.

The Tekkali creek and the villages in its vicinity like Telineelapuram, Ijjuvaram, Naupada in the district have become a seasonal resort for the winged tourists coming from as far as Siberia in Russia, Malaysia, Hungary, Singapore and Germany apart from 113 different species of inland birds, a majority of which are migrants from other states.

== Weather ==
The temperature ranges in summer is between 22–39 °C (72–102 °F) and in winter it is between 15–26 °C (59–79 °F).

== Transport ==
Nearest railway station to Telineelapuram is Naupada railway station which is a 3 km distance. Whereas the nearest railway station to visit Telikunchi Bird sanctuary is Ichapuram (IPM) 4 km away from the location.
