= Triantafyllou =

Surname list

Triantafyllou (Greek: Τριανταφύλλου) is a Greek surname. Notable people with the surname include:

- Michael Triantafyllou, Greek mechanical engineer
- Panagiotis Triantafyllou, Greek wheelchair fencer
- Eugenia Triantafyllou, Greek writer
- Soti Triantafyllou (born 1957), Greek writer
- Pericles K. Triantafyllou (1934 - 2017), merchant and industrialist, founder of the canning company ELNAKO, president of Pannafpliakos-Iraklis F.C. and vice-president of Panaigialeios F.C.
