= Vardoulakis =

Vardoulakis (Greek: Βαρδουλάκης) is a Greek surname. Notable people with the surname include:

- Dimitris Vardoulakis (born 1975), Greek philosopher
- Ioannis Vardoulakis (1949–2009), Greek scientist
