= Govinda puram =

Indian village

Coordinates: 19.164848°N 84.775734°E

- Village
- Interactive map of Govinda puram
- Country: India
- Union Territory: Odisha

Govinda puram is a village in Ganjam district in the south of Odisha, India, bordering Andhra Pradesh. It is located southeast of Berhampur and northeast of Ichchapuram. Govinda puram is a business center catering to surrounding villages. The major occupations are agriculture and trading.
