= Nikos Markatos =

Nikolaos – Christos Markatos of Gregorios is former rector of NTUA (1991–1997) and professor emeritus of the department of chemical engineering of NTUA. He was visiting professor at the department of applied mathematics and theoretical physics at the University of Cambridge, and he is fellow of the Royal Academy of Arts in England (FRSA). He is also visiting professor at Texas A&M university, since 1 January 2016.

Born in Athens, Greece, on 1 March 1944, he studied chemical engineering at NTUA. In 1967 and continued his postgraduate specialization in business administration at Athens University of Economics in 1969. He continued his postgraduate studies at the Imperial College of London from 1970 to 1974 where he obtained his diploma (DIC), and at the same university his doctoral diploma (PhD) in engineering in 1974. The same year he worked as post-doctoral researcher in fluid dynamics and thermodynamics, Department of Mechanical Engineering, Imperial College of London and worked with the internationally renowned Professor D.B.Spalding, FRS, with whom he continued to work until the latter's death in 2017.

He worked until 1984 at CHAM Ltd company as director of the Department of Aerospace (1976) and then (from 1977 onwards) as director of the Application Development all research departments of the company. In December 1982 he was elected professor in the School of Mathematics and Scientific Computing, University of Greenwitch, London, and director of the Centre for Mathematical Modelling and Process Analysis, a centre he created with Prof. M. Cross, the head of school. The centre is still going strong in original research. Since April 1983 he worked alongside as a visiting professor in Computational Fluid Dynamics Unit of Imperial College of London. From 1974 he worked as a technical consultant to many research centers and government institutions in many countries. He is a recipient of many awards. In June 1980 he was awarded, by the Inventions Council of NASA, the Certificate of Recognition and an award for the "Creative development of innovative technology which is considered as a serious contribution with future consequences in aerospace and other fields of science".

In 1985 he was elected professor of chemical engineering, NTUA and the years 1990 and 1992 was twice elected dean of the same department, a position he held until 1994. He was elected rector of the NTUA twice, in 1991 and 1994. In 2006 and then in 2008 he was elected again dean of the School of Chemical Engineering until 2010. In 2002 and 2003 he was senior visiting professor of applied mathematics and theoretical physics, University of Cambridge, and Fellow of Selwyn College, University of Cambridge. He was a visiting professor at Surrey University, UK (2000-2010). In 1996 he was awarded an honorary doctorate by the University of Sofia, Bulgaria (doctorate honoris causa).

He was a municipal councilor in the municipality of Athens from 1994 to 1998.

He was a candidate MP with the political party PASOK in B 'Athens in the 2004 national elections. Also, in the national elections on 6 May 2012 and in the elections for the European Parliament in 2014 participated as a candidate collaborating (although ideologically belonging to a different party) with the political party Independent Greeks. In July 2014 he disagreed with the president of the Independent Greeks Panos Kammenos about issues on Cyprus and has since left. He served as a councillor for the Municipality of Athens (1995-1999). His social activities in Greece and abroad are very well known through his publications in the national press and his appearances on TV. He has presented two TV series, one that lasted for years on education ("The Educational and Cultural Files") and the other on technology ("Human Works"), that promoted the notion of the “Universitas” as the place where society reflects upon itself, and discussed the role of technology in the future of humanity and the planet. Six years as rector and eight years as dean he organized dozens of social, cultural and political events, such as “The Athens Summit”, that attracted international interest and had as speakers, among others, Mikhail Gorbatchev, the then president of Cyprus Vassiliou, Simon Perez, Peter Ustinov, Neal Kinnock, and many more. Six years as rector of NTUA and eight years as dean of School of Chemical Engineering made him very competent in organising matters, such as research and coordination of projects and personnel. When he was elected as rector, the university had a debt of 500 million drachmas. Six years later it had a surplus of 11 billion drachmas, as a result of organising research and managing the university assets. The National Technical University of Athens became among the top in rank European Universities in obtaining competitive European projects. The return of its other assets rose from below 1% to above 8%, a level at which it still is. As rector he also established the concepts of continuous education, service laboratories (which offer paid-for services to clients), the “Industrial Linkage” University Office. He also organised the postgraduate studies and introduced into the engineering curriculum topics in humanities. The library and all other administrative functions were electronically organised and controlled via a sophisticated network of optical fibres. His laboratory of Computational Mechanics contributed to the improvement of the Athens air pollution (nefos), and has assisted local communities throughout Greece to improve their environmental conditions (examples include, the proper placing of a power plant in Lesvos, refusing the installation of a Chinese port in south Crete, installing a centre for accident prevention and management in west Attica and performing the Seveso studies on behalf of the relevant ministries). It is also worth mentioning, the development of an internationally innovative computer system, FIREMENTOR (see Internet), for the early warning and management of forest fires. He was co-ordinator of two European projects in energy efficiency in process technology, and he was recently co-ordinating a LIFE project on e-symbiosis. He has been a scientific partner in several others and in many Greek-funded ones. He is currently involved in sustainable development (particularly at Texas A&M), and researches with his Ph.D. students alternative forms of energy (wind turbines, fuel cells and photovoltaics). His contribution to teaching is also considerable, and his views on modern educational tools have found support in the student population. He is currently teaching at Texas A&M University "Computational Sustainability topics" and at National Technical University of Athens "Computational Fluid Mechanics", at postgraduate level. He has clear ideas on education, culture and the role of the university in the modern era, which he has published in the national press of Greece and presented in scientific conferences in Europe. Among his other activities, a very important one was the development under his leadership of “The Lavrion Technological Park”, as an incubator of innovation and culture educator. This park links today university research and market development. An effort was also made to create the “University of Alexander the Great” in Alexandria, Egypt, at the premises of the old Hellenic Schools there. Although the project started successfully, it was never accomplished because of problems the Ministry of Foreign Affairs had. Finally, under his efforts a postgraduate centre in Metsovo (North Western Greece) was established which works successfully until now, to honour the Metsovo donors, who helped, in the 19th century, create NTUA (Metsovion Polytechneion).

He is married to Christina Kroussa and has three children.
