= L. Prakasam =

Indian church leader (died 1998)

Lella Prakasam, CBCNC
- Born: Andhra Pradesh
- Died: 18 July 1998; Visakhapatnam, Andhra Pradesh
- Occupations: Auxiliary Secretary, Bible Society of India Andhra Pradesh Auxiliary
- Congregations served: Ichchapuram, Sompeta, Tekkali, Visakhapatnam
- Offices held: Chaplain, Arogyavaram Eye Hospital, Sompeta; Manager, Bible Society of India Andhra Pradesh Auxiliary Bible House and Reading Room, Visakhapatnam (1974–1982); Auxiliary Secretary, Bible Society of India Andhra Pradesh Auxiliary, Secunderabad (1982–1998)
- Title: The Reverend

L. Prakasam was a pastor of the Convention of Baptist Churches of Northern Circars who served as the auxiliary secretary of the Bible Society of India Andhra Pradesh Auxiliary during the period 1982–1998, the longest in the history of the auxiliary.

Prakasam belonged to the Krishna Association of the Convention of Baptist Churches of Northern Circars and hailed from Akiveedu.

== Ecclesiastical ministry ==
=== Convention of Baptist Churches of Northern Circars ===
The Convention of Baptist Churches of Northern Circars posted Prakasam to parishes in the northern coastal area of Andhra Pradesh along the Bay of Bengal in Ichchapuram, Sompeta, Tekkali and Visakhapatnam. Prakasam was Pastor of the Calvary Baptist Church, Visakhapatnam in 1980–1981.

=== Bible Society of India Andhra Pradesh Auxiliary ===
Prakasam first joined the Bible Society of India Andhra Pradesh Auxiliary during the tenure of the Auxiliary Secretary B. G. Prasada Rao in 1974 as Manager of the Bible House and Reading Room in Waltair. In 1981, when the successive auxiliary secretary, T. B. D. Prakasa Rao was recalled by his church society, the vacant position was filled with the elevation of Prakasam as the auxiliary secretary of the Bible Society of India Andhra Pradesh Auxiliary, who moved over to Secunderabad. During the tenure of Prakasam, revisions of the Bible in the Telugu language were periodically held by the Old Testament scholars Graham Ogden, G. Babu Rao and G. D. V. Prasad and the New Testament scholar Jonadob Nathaniel from the Bible Society of India, Bangalore. Prakasam was also instrumental in the modernisation of the auxiliary, ensuring that the Translations, Distribution, and Resource Mobilisation areas were developed.

After serving nearly 17 years of distinguished work at the auxiliary, Prakasam died on 18 July 1998 in Visakhapatnam. To fill the unexpected void, the Bible Society of India appointed Prakasam's confidant and Bible Society of India Andhra Pradesh Auxiliary Old Testament Common Language Translation Coordinator G. Babu Rao, who was a lecturer at the Andhra Christian Theological College, Secunderabad, and well versed with the Bible Society work as translator since 1973 from the period of B. G. Prasada Rao.

Other offices
Preceded by T. B. D. Prakasa Rao, CSI; 1976–1981	Auxiliary Secretary; Bible Society of India Andhra Pradesh Auxiliary, Secunderabad; 1982-1998	Succeeded by G. Babu Rao, CBCNC; 1998–2001
