= Talatampara =

Coordinates: 18°28′N 83°43′E

Talatampara kalinga puttuga
- village
- Interactive map of Talatampara
- Country: India
- State: Andhra Pradesh
- District: Srikakulam

Population (2001)
  - Total: 4,193

Languages
  - Official: Telugu and odia
- Time zone: UTC+5:30 (IST)
- Nearest city: Visakhapatnam
- Climate: normal (Köppen)

Talatampara is a panchayat in Kanchili mandal of Srikakulam District in Andhra Pradesh, India. It is located in between the small towns Sompeta and Kaviti.

== Demographics ==
As of 2001 Indian census, the demographic details of Talatampara village is as follows:

- Total Population: 4,193 in 914 Households
- Male Population: 2,060 and Female Population: 2,133
- Children Under 6-years of age: 565 (Boys - 287 and Girls - 278)
- Total Literates: 2,470
