= RoboTuna =

Investigation into design of autonomous underwater vehicles

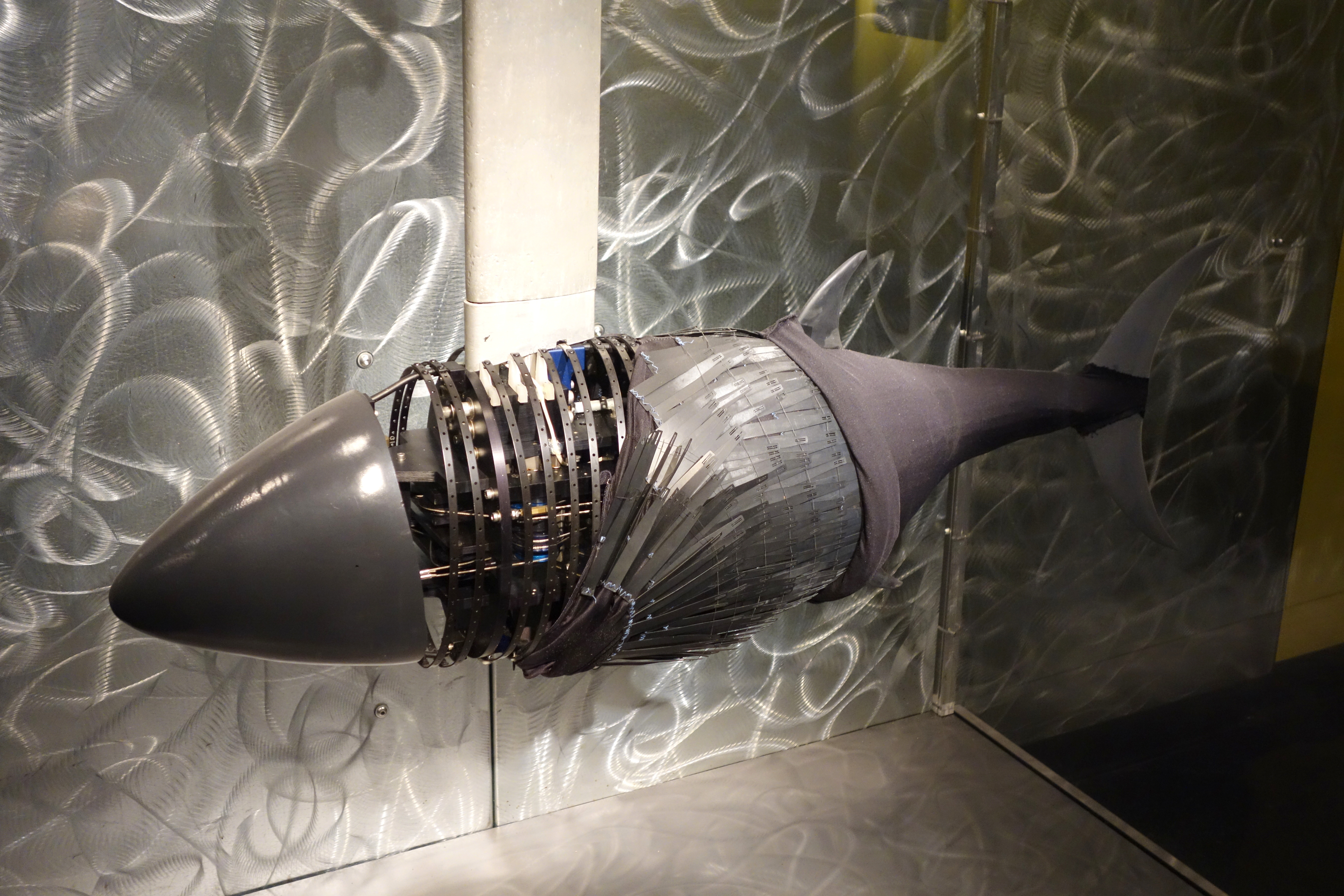
RoboTuna on display at the MIT Museum.

The RoboTuna was a robotics project involving a series of robotic fish designed and built by a team of scientists at the Massachusetts Institute of Technology (MIT).

== The project ==
The RoboTuna project started in 1993. The aim was to investigate the possibility of constructing a robotic submarine that could reproduce the way tuna swim and see if it could serve as a superior system of propulsion for autonomous underwater vehicles.

The experiment was a success, as researchers discovered that their robotic fish was both more maneuverable and used less energy than other robotic submarines. The Science Museum in London, UK, has one on display in its geophysics and oceanography section as of 2015.

== Improvements ==
While the early results were successful, the RoboTuna was not able to replicate the bursts of acceleration that real tuna were able to manage. Researchers improved the design using a genetic algorithm, in which the best systems will "get to have virtual offspring", according to researcher David Barrett. Early incarnations worked poorly but, as the system evolved, the RoboTuna's abilities improved. Visualization techniques showed that the RoboTuna had begun taking advantage of vortices that it created. A swish of its tail one way created a vortex, which was then used by a swish the other way, thus propelling it off the vortex it had created. This technique not only helps the robotic fish with normal swimming, but also explains the impressive standing start speeds of real tuna.

== The researchers ==
Those involved in the project included Michael Triantafyllou, David Barrett (who built the first RoboTuna (Charlie I) in 1995 for his PhD thesis), and David Beal and Michael Sachinis, who introduced several modifications (including a cable-pulley system) to produce RoboTuna II.

== See also ==
- Tunabot
