= National Technical University of Athens =

Greek university

Coordinates: 37°59′16.31″N 23°43′53.81″E

- Εθνικό Μετσόβιο Πολυτεχνείο
- Logo
- Type: Public higher education institution
- Established: December 31, 1836; 189 years ago (OS); January 27, 1837; 189 years ago (NS)
- Academic affiliations: TIME, CESAER
- Budget: 5,065,956.40 (2024)
- Rector: Ioannis Chatzigeorgiou
- Administrative staff: 512
- Students: 23,914
- Location: Athens, Greece
- Campus: Patision Complex (central Athens), Zografou campus (Central Athens district)
- Colors: White & gold
- Mascot: Prometheus
- Website: www.ntua.gr/en/

The National Technical University of Athens (NTUA; Greek: Εθνικό Μετσόβιο Πολυτεχνείο, romanized: Ethnikó Metsóvio Polytechneío, lit. 'National Metsovian Polytechnic'), sometimes known as Athens Polytechnic, is a public technical university in Athens, Greece. Founded in 1837, it is the oldest technical university in Greece. It is named Metsovio(n) in honor of its benefactors Nikolaos Stournaris, Eleni Tositsa, Michail Tositsas and Georgios Averoff, whose origin is from the town of Metsovo in Epirus.

It was founded in 1837 as a part-time vocational school named Royal School of Arts which, as its role in the technical development of the fledgling state grew, developed into Greece's sole institution providing engineering degrees up until the 1950s, when polytechnics were established outside Athens. Its traditional campus, located in the center of Athens on Patission Avenue on a site donated by Eleni Tositsa, features a suite of neoclassical buildings by architect Lysandros Kaftantzoglou (1811–1885). A new campus, the Zografou Campus, was built in the 1980s.

NTUA is divided into nine academic schools, eight being for the engineering disciplines, including architecture, and one for applied sciences (mathematics and physics). Undergraduate studies have a duration of five years.

The university comprises about 700 of academic staff, 140 scientific assistants and 260 administrative and technical staff. It also has about 8,500 undergraduates and about 1,500 postgraduate students. Eight of the NTUA's Schools are housed at the Zografou Campus, while the School of Architecture is based at the Patission Complex.

== History ==
NTUA was established by royal decree on December 31, 1836 (OS), January 21, 1837 (NS), under the name "Royal School of Arts" (Greek: Βασιλικό Σχολείο των Τεχνών). It began functioning as a part-time vocational school (only Sundays and holidays) to train craftsmen, builders and master craftsmen to cover the needs of the new Greek state. In 1840, due to its increasing popularity and the changing socio-economic conditions, NTUA was upgraded to a full time technical school which worked alongside the Sunday school. Courses were expanded and the institution was housed in its own building on Pireos Street.

=== The restructuring ===
In 1843 a major restructuring was made. Three departments were created:

- Part-Time Vocational School
- Daily School
- A new Higher School of Fine Arts

The new department's object was fine arts and engineering. The new department, which was later renamed School of Industrial and Fine Arts, rapidly evolved towards a major higher education institution. Tradition has it that arts referred to both technical professions and fine arts. Even today, the school maintains a school of architecture that is closely related to the School of Fine Arts, which later evolved to become a separate school.

The name Polytechnnic came in 1862, with the introduction of several new technical courses. This restructuring continued steadily until 1873. At the time, the school became overwhelmed by the plethora of students wishing to learn higher technical skills. This led to its move to a new campus.

=== The relocation ===
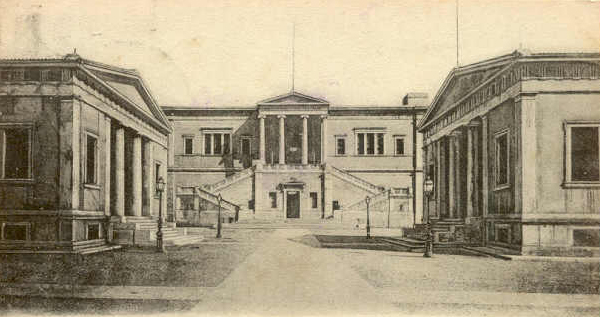
The historical Patission Street campus in a postcard of 1900.

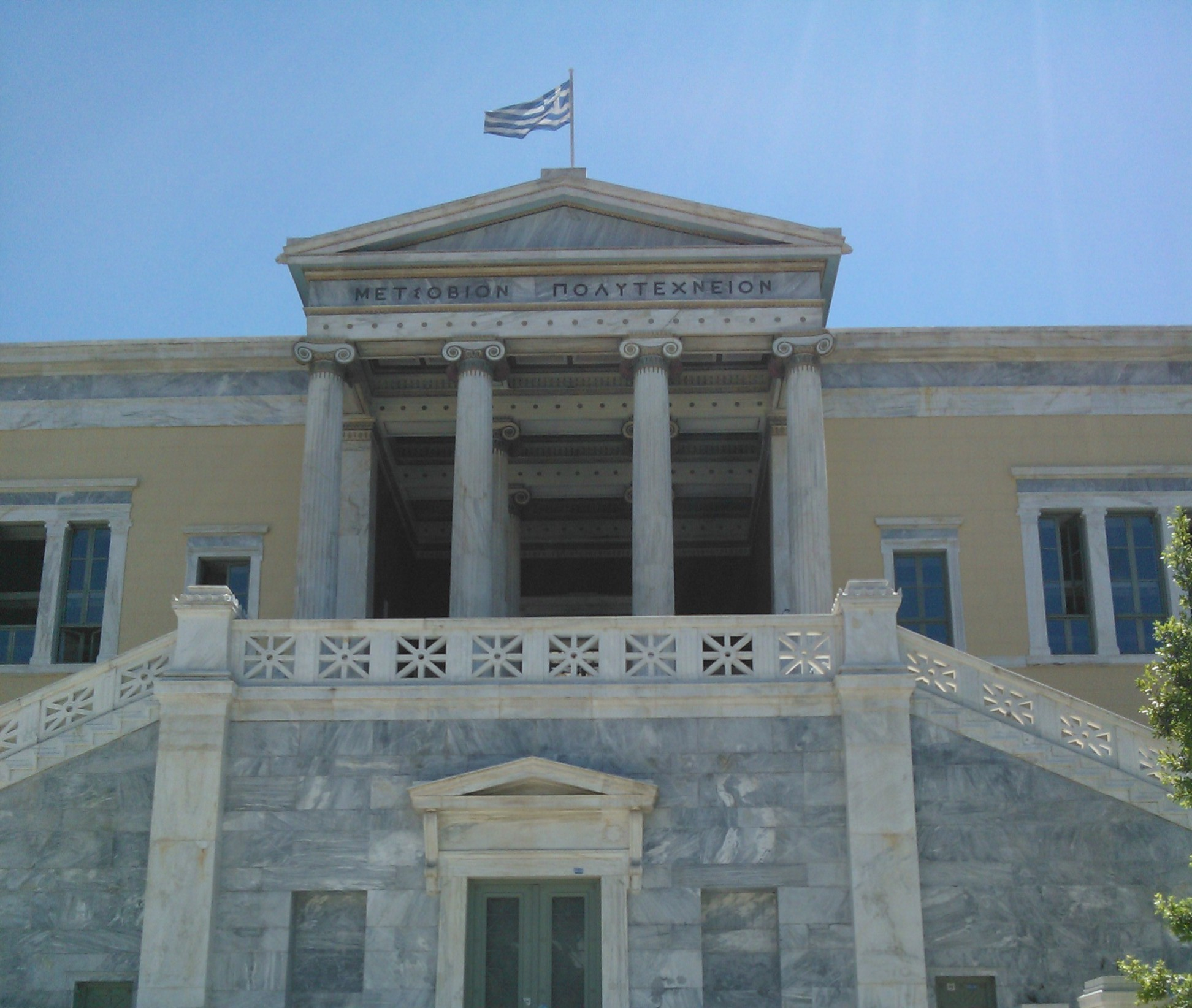
The main facade of the Averof building today.

In 1873 it moved to its new campus in Patission Street and was known as Metsovion Polytechnion (Metsovian Polytechnic) after the birthplace of the benefactors who financed construction of this campus. Though the Patission Street campus was incomplete at the time, rising student demand made it urgent to relocate.

In 1887, the institution was partitioned into three technical schools: Structural Engineering, Architecture and Mechanical Engineering — all four-year degrees at the time. It was at this point that the institute was recognized as a technical education facility by the state adapting to the nation’s developmental needs.

In 1914, new schools were created and was officially named Ethnicon Metsovion Polytechnion (National Metsovian Polytechnic) went under the supervision of the Ministry of Public Works. This is when new technical schools started to be formed, a process that was completed three years later, in 1917, when the NTUA changed form. By special law, the old School of Industrial Arts was now separated into the Higher Schools of Civil Engineering, Mechanical & Electrical Engineering, Chemical Engineering, Surveying Engineering and Architecture. Later, the schools of Naval Engineering, and Mining and Metallurgical Engineering were formed, and the school of Mechanical & Electrical Engineering was split up into two separate schools, Mechanical Engineering and Electrical and Computer Engineering, which is almost the form of schools maintained until now.

In 1923, the NTUA alumni formed the core of the Technical Chamber of Greece, the professional organization that serves as the official technical adviser of the Greek state and is responsible for awarding professional licenses to all practicing engineers in Greece.

In 1930, the Athens School of Fine Arts was established, acquiring its independence from the NTUA, as a school exclusively focused in the teaching the fine arts. This allowed the two schools to develop separately as a technical and an arts school respectively.

In 1941 to 1944, the National Technical University of Athens played an important role in the country's political life with the Greek students participating in the National Resistance under the German occupation. During the Axis occupation of Greece, NTUA, in addition to its function as an academic institution, became one of the most active resistance centers in Athens.

=== The uprising ===
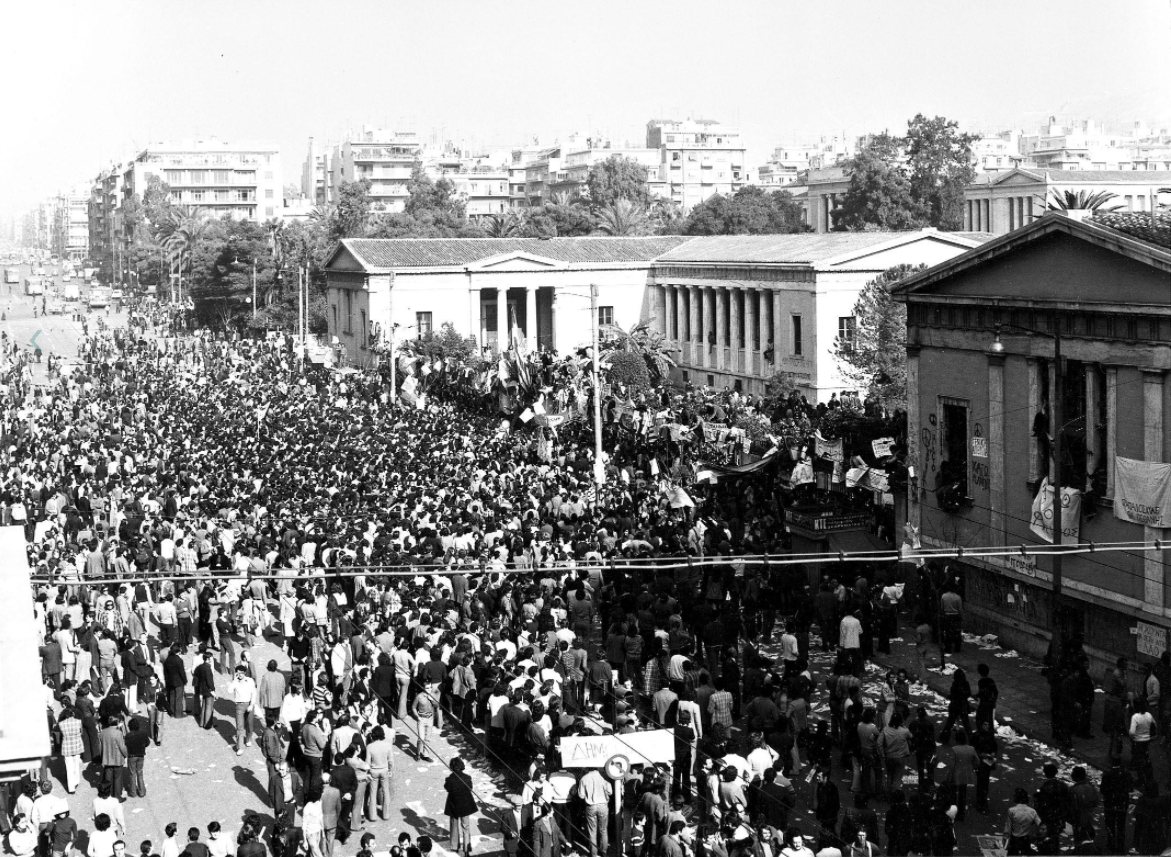
Protesters outside NTUA's Patission Complex during the Athens Polytechnic uprising in November 1973.

The Polytechnic uprising of November, 1973, marked a turning point in Greece's struggle against the military dictatorship that had seized power in 1967. This historic event, which began with student protests at NTUA, culminated in a brutal crackdown by the regime.

The uprising was ignited by a series of student demonstrations and occupations, each met with increasing violence from the authorities. The final confrontation began on November 14, when students barricaded themselves inside NTUA's Patission Complex and began broadcasting a pirate radio station, calling for popular rebellion.

On November 17, the military regime used army tanks to break through the gates and unleash a wave of violence against the students and their supporters. The toll of the Polytechnion uprising was tragic. Several demonstrators were killed; many more were arrested by the military police and were tortured for months in military prisons. The uprising galvanized the Greek people and the junta was irreparably damaged by the popular outcry (it fell in 1974, after the Turkish invasion in Cyprus).

The uprising is commemorated annually on November 17 by students, political parties, and the Greek government as a symbol of the struggle for freedom, democracy, and social justice. A monument created by Memos Makris and erected at the NTUA campus honors the victims of the uprising and serves as a poignant reminder of the sacrifices made by those who fought against tyranny.

== Emblem ==
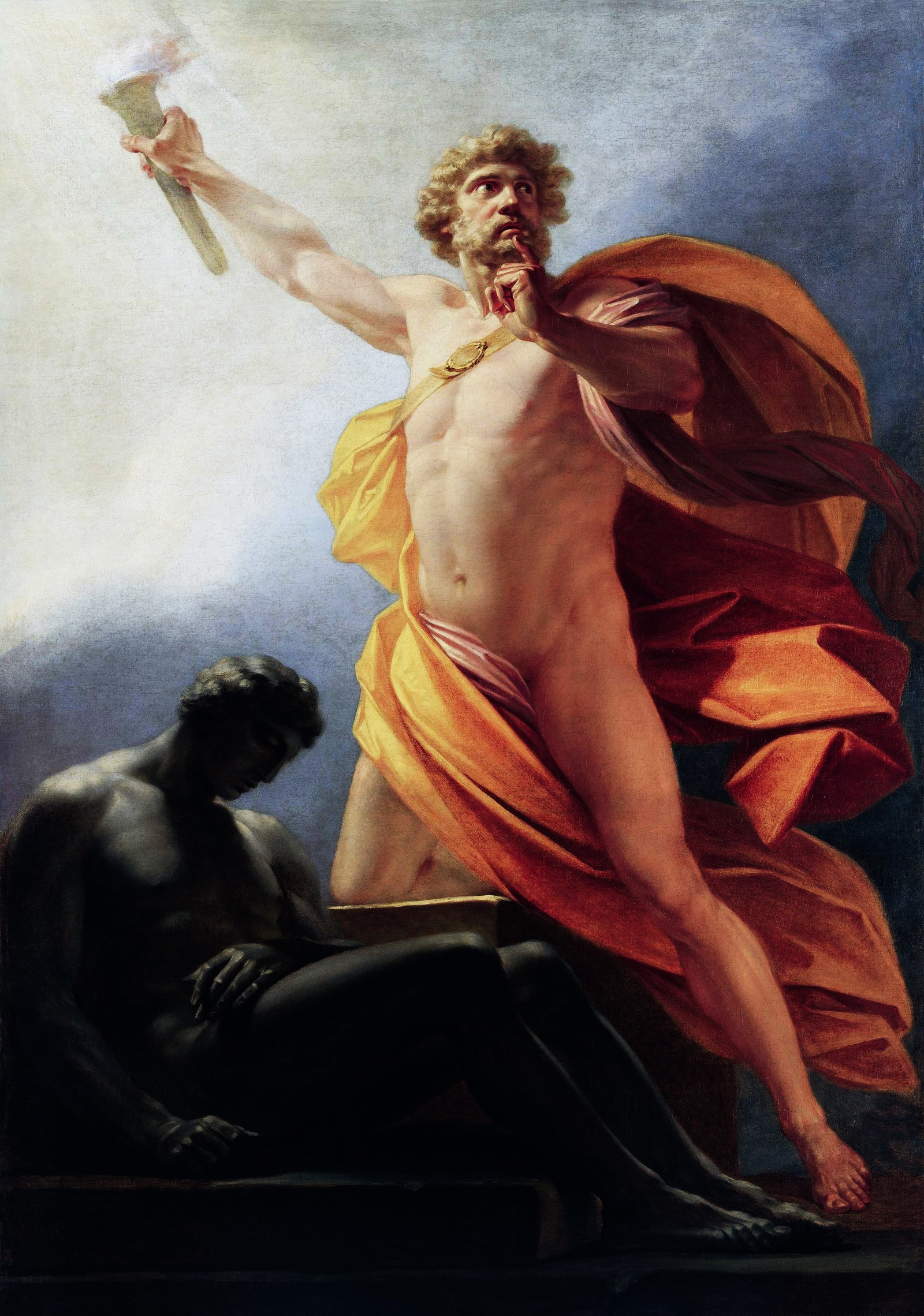
Prometheus Brings Fire by Heinrich Friedrich Füger. Prometheus brings fire to mankind as told by Hesiod, with its having been hidden as revenge for the trick at Mecone.

The emblem of the NTUA features Prometheus bringing the fire from the gods to the mankind. In Greek mythology, Prometheus defied the Olympian gods by giving fire to humanity in the form of technology, knowledge and, more generally, civilization. This emblem underscores NTUA's commitment to addressing real human needs and dimensions.

The emblem is round and black. It features Prometheus in the center holding a lit torch with his right hand. To the right is an altar with a flame on top and the name "Prometheus the Fire-bringer (Pyrphoros) inscribed on the sides. On the left side of the emblem, the name ΕΘΝ • ΜΕΤΣΟΒ • ΠΟΛΥΤΕΧΝΕΙΟΝ is written in capital letters, along with the year NTUA was established in Greek numerals (i.e.,).

The emblem was designed in 1954 by the greek artist Nikos Hadjikyriakos-Ghikas, who also served as Professor of Drawing until 1958. His original sketches for the emblem are part of the Hadjikyriakos-Ghikas collection of the Benaki Museum.

== Academic profile ==
=== Schools ===
The National Technical University of Athens is divided into nine academic schools (Greek: σχολές), which are furthermore divided into 33 departments (Greek: τομείς):

- School of Applied Mathematical and Physical Sciences (founded 1999)
- School of Electrical and Computer Engineering (founded 1975)
- School of Civil Engineering (founded 1837)
- School of Mechanical Engineering (founded 1982)
- School of Architecture (founded 1917)
- School of Chemical Engineering (founded 1917)
- School of Rural, Surveying and Geoinformatics Engineering (founded 1917)
- School of Mining and Metallurgical Engineering (founded 1946)
- School of Naval Architecture and Marine Engineering (founded 1969)
Departments by School
- School of Applied Mathematical and Physical Sciences
  - Department of Mathematics Archived 2006-12-06 at the Wayback Machine
  - Department of Physics
  - Department of Mechanics
  - Department of Humanities, Social Sciences and Law
- School of Electrical and Computer Engineering
  - Department of Signals, Controls and Robotics
  - Department of Computer Science
  - Department of Εlectric Power
  - Department of Electromagnetics, Electrooptics and Electronic Materials
  - Department of Industrial Electric Devices and Decision Systems
  - Department of Communications, Electronics and Information Systems
  - Department of Information Transmission Systems and Material Technology
- School of Civil Engineering
  - Department of Structural Engineering
  - Department of Water Resources, Hydraulic and Maritime Engineering
  - Department of Transportation Planning and Engineering
  - Department of Geotechnical Engineering
  - Department of Engineering Construction and Management

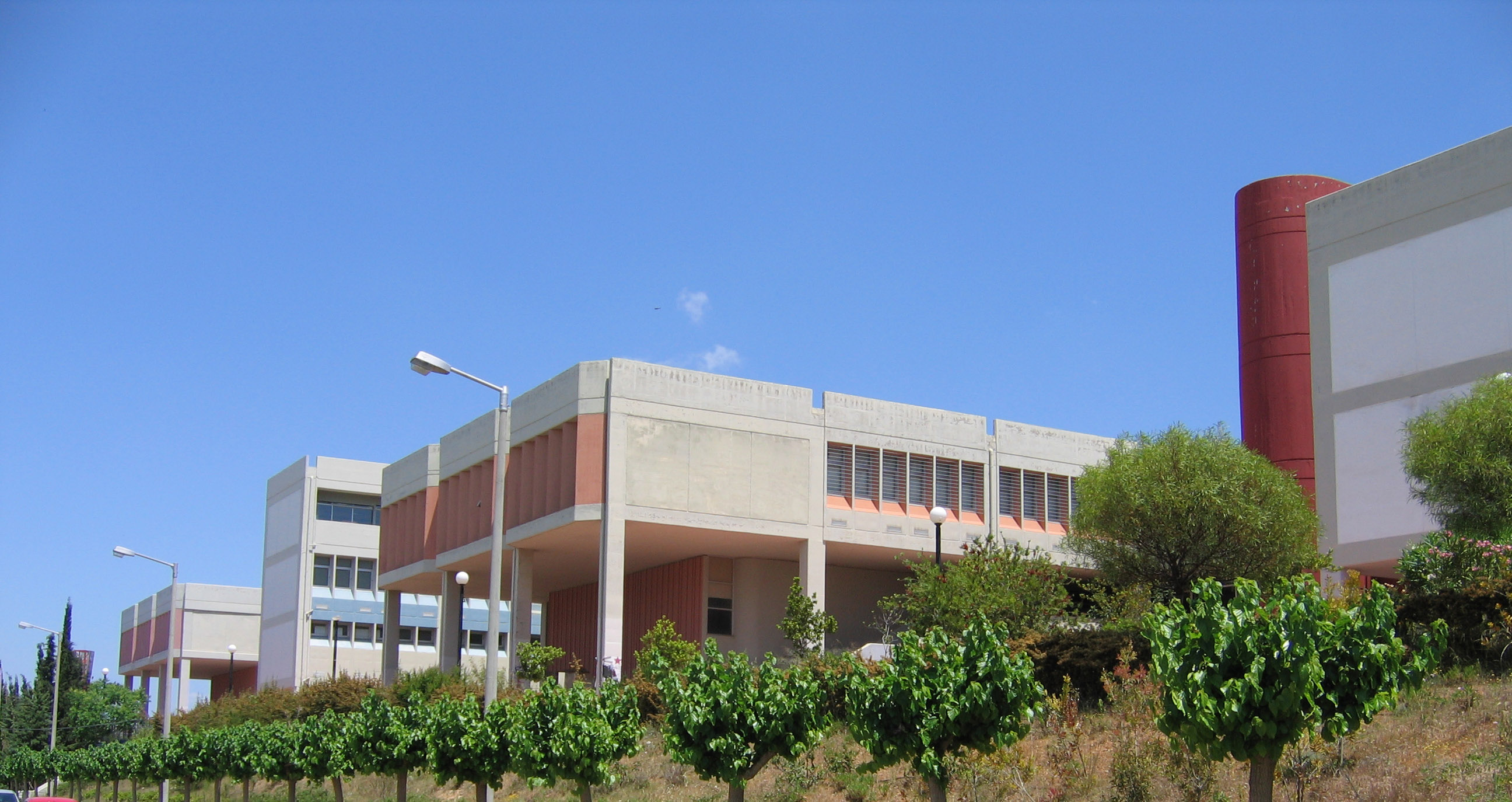
View of the School of Mechanical Engineering.

- School of Mechanical Engineering
  - Department of Fluid Mechanics Engineering
  - Department of Thermal Engineering
  - Department of Nuclear Engineering
  - Department of Mechanical Constructions and Automatic Control
  - Department of Manufacturing Technology
  - Department of Industrial Management and Operational Research
- School of Architecture
  - Department of Architectural Design
  - Department of Urban and Regional Planning
  - Department of Interior Design and Landscaping
  - Department of Building Technology-Structural Design and Mechanical Equipment
- School of Chemical Engineering
  - Department of Chemical Sciences
  - Department of Process and Systems Analysis, Design and Development
  - Department of Materials Science and Engineering
  - Department of Synthesis and Development of Industrial Processes
- School of Rural, Surveying and Geoinformatics Engineering
  - Department of Topography
  - Department of Geography and Regional Planning
  - Department of Infrastructure and Rural Development
- School of Mining and Metallurgical Engineering
  - Department of Geological Sciences
  - Department of Mining Engineering
  - Department of Metallurgy and Materials Technology
- School of Naval Architecture and Marine Engineering (in Greek)
  - Department of Ship Design & Maritime Transport
  - Department of Ship Hydrodynamics
  - Department of Marine Engineering
  - Department of Marine Structures

=== Studies ===
==== Undergraduate studies ====
The academic calendar of NTUA comprises 10 independent, integral academic semesters. Each semester lasts 18 weeks: 13 weeks of classes, a two-week break (Christmas and Easter holidays for the fall and spring semester respectively), and three weeks of semester exams. The tenth semester is devoted to the preparation of the diploma thesis. The diploma thesis has to be related to one of the courses of the faculty. The student has at his or her disposal at least a full academic semester to prepare the thesis. Upon completion of the thesis, the student must take part in an oral examination that can take place either in June, October or February, after the final examinations, provided that the student has passed all courses prescribed by the curriculum.

An important part of the studies in NTUA are the summer training projects which take place in Industrial and Production Units, in the period between the end of the spring semester and the beginning of the fall semester. They constitute an elective course for the Faculties of Civil Engineering, Survey Engineering (Surveying and Geodesy Camp) and Mining and Metallurgy Engineering (Mining Camp) and are partially subsidized by the European Union.

==== Postgraduate studies ====
There are currently 20 departmental or inter-departmental postgraduate courses, coordinated by NTUA Departments, leading to the respective Post Graduate Specialization Diploma, with a minimum duration of 17 months, including one in Business Administration (in collaboration with the Athens University of Economics and Business). Moreover, NTUA participates in nine post-graduate programs coordinated by other Greek Universities. After the acquisition of the Post Graduate Specialization Diploma, the student can proceed towards submitting a doctoral thesis.

=== Academic staff ===
NTUA Academic staff per school
School	Lecturers	Associate professors	Assistant professors	professors	Emeritus	Total
School of Applied Mathematics and Physics	5	35	27	40	13	120
School of Electrical and Computer Engineering	1	11	12	52	20	96
School of Civil Engineering	12	16	17	23	13	81
School of Mechanical Engineering	5	12	8	20	10	55
School of Architecture	18	20	9	34	38	119
School of Chemical Engineering	6	13	10	48	-	77
School of Rural and Surveying Engineering	7	14	5	15	8	49
School of Mining and Metallurgical Engineering	4	10	9	14	14	51
School of Naval Architecture and Marine Engineering	0	4	5	15	5	29

== Research and innovation ==
NTUA boasts high research activity, as research and education are both its goals. Research is managed by administrative and education personnel, but can be conducted by graduate and sometimes undergraduate students as well. Research is administered by five separate offices:

1. The Special Accounting for Research Office (ΕΛΚΕ)
2. The Liaison Office
3. The Innovation and Entrepreneurship Unit
4. The Internship Program
5. The Office of Researchers
6. The Interdisciplinary Research Center
7. The Interdisciplinary Unit for Reusable Energy

Research is funded by the NTUA endowment, or often directly through public or private funds.

=== Ranking ===
University rankings

Global – Overall
- ARWU World: 801–900 (2024)
- QS World: =378 (2027)
- THE World: 801–1000 (2026)
- USNWR Global: =615 (2026)

The National Technical university of Athens is one of Greece's top universities. The 2027 QS World University Rankings (WUR) ranked NTUA #387, with the 2026 QS faculty area rank being #134 for Engineering & Technology.. According to the 2026 QS WUR Ranking By Subject for Civil and Structural Engineering, NTUA falls within the 51-100 range. Its highest position in this category was #25 in 2013. NTUA has the highest citation impact score (0.88) among the Greek universities, based on a ranking prepared by the Directorate General for Science and Research of the European Commission in 2003 (updated 2004) that was compiled as part of the Third European Report on Science & Technology Indicators. During 2022, 130 researchers from NTUA were included among the top-cited scientists (top 2%).

=== Academic evaluation ===
Between October 2015 and July 2016, the Hellenic Authority for Higher Education (HEHA) carried out the external evaluation of all Greek institutions of higher education. The final external evaluation report for NTUA was submitted by the experts in November 2016. The report stresses that NTUA is well-organized and boasts an outstanding reputation due to its students and faculty, who have significantly contributed to Greek science and technology. Challenges include adapting to changes in higher education, legal obstacles, and staff alignment. The university has a broad and diverse range of subjects, strong industry links, and a commitment to quality assurance, but faces issues like state intervention, funding inadequacies, and the need for better external stakeholder engagement and internal services.

== Campus ==
=== Patission Complex ===
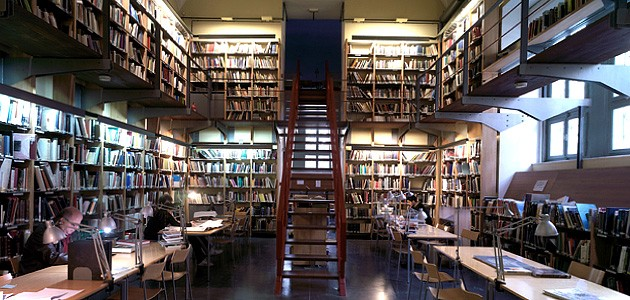
NTUA School of Architecture Library at the Patission Complex

The Averof building is one of the most important and elegant buildings of the Athenian Neoclassical period located in the center of Athens and the most important work of architect Lysandros Kaftanzoglou. It constitutes also one of the most important creations of European Neoclassicism, directly influenced in its design by the monuments of the Athenian Acropolis. Its construction began in 1862 and ended in 1878. After its completion, the building was in continuous use for more than 125 years during which it suffered from several additions and alterations. The main building has housed at times the National Gallery and various exhibitions of Schliemann's archaeological findings and relics of the 1821 Greek revolution.

The Averof building reached a deteriorating state and was eventually in great need of restoration and modernization in order to continue operating as an educational establishment. The aim of the conservation project, namely for the Averof to be used again as an educational building, was successfully achieved after the building became operative in the beginning of 2010 and won the grand prize of Europa Nostra in 2012.

=== Zografou Campus ===
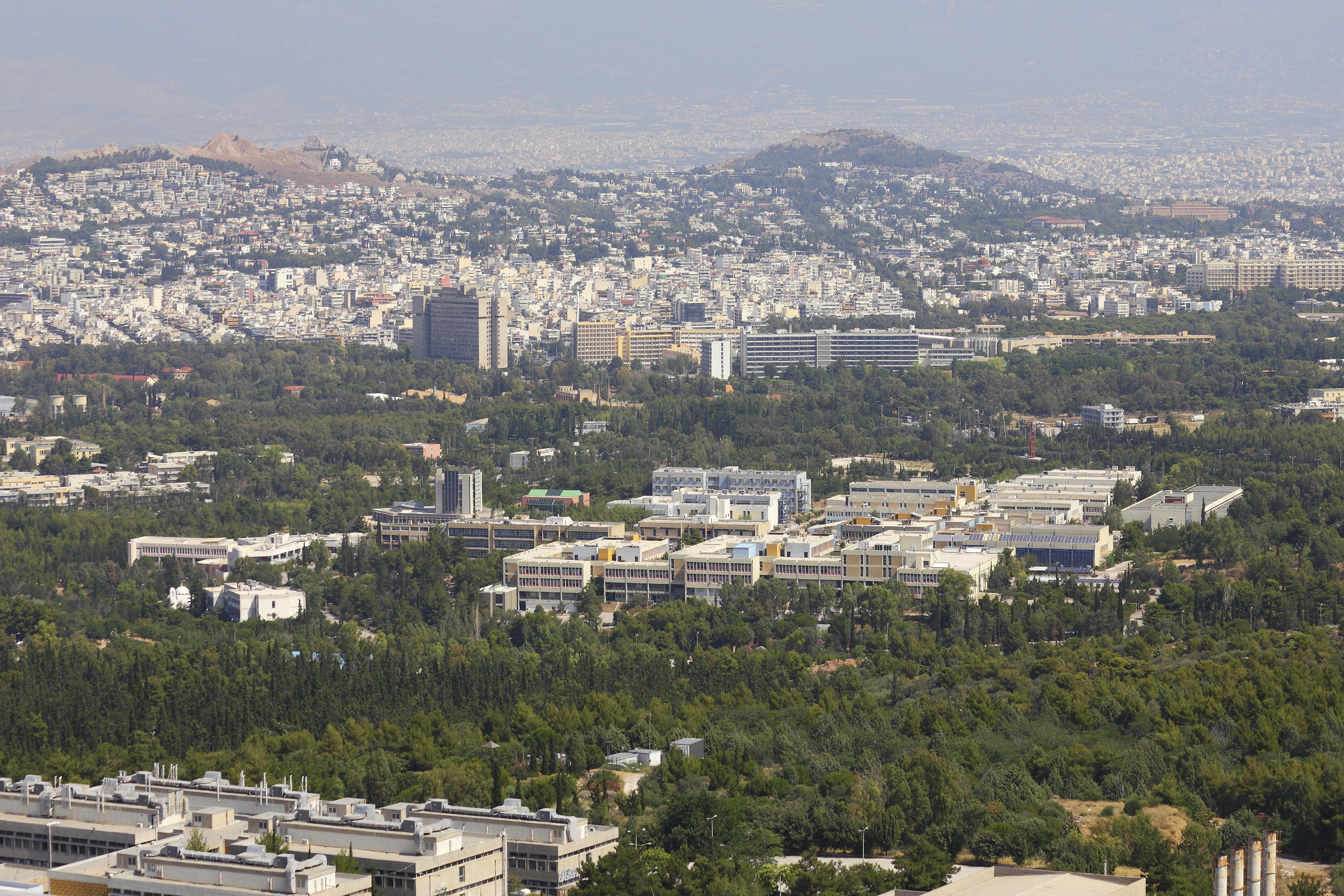
View of the Zografou campus from Kalogeros hill

The main campus is located in the Zografou area of the Athens metropolitan area, housing all the schools except that of Architecture, which remains in its traditional location on the Patission Avenue for historical reasons. The main campus spreads over an area of about 190 acres, 6 km from the center of Athens. It includes 65 acre buildings fully equipped with lecture theaters, laboratories, libraries, gyms, a central library, a computer center and a medical center.

The School of Applied Mathematics and Physical Sciences is housed in the center of the campus. Right next to it is the Mining and Metallurgical Engineering School. The Civil Engineering School and the Rural and Surveying Engineering School are both housed on the south-west near the Zografou Gate. Mechanical Engineering, Chemical Engineering, Naval Engineering, and the new Electrical Engineering School are all housed near the middle of the campus, while the old Electrical Engineering buildings remain on the north-east.

==== Transportation ====
There are in-campus roads making all buildings accessible by bicycle and car. There are also various internal buses that allow for transportation within the facilities, driving around the perimeter of the campus and through eight different bus stops. The campus is accessible through three main gates: the Katechaki and Kokkinopoulou Gates on the north, and the Zografou Gate on the west. There are 2,000 dedicated parking spots scattered throughout the campus, most nearby all major buildings. The campus resides near the subway Katechaki station, which makes it accessible within minutes from any area of Athens. Furthermore, six different buses are available for transportation from various city locations to the campus: the 608 from Galatsi, 230 from Acropolis, 242 from the Katechaki Metro station and 140 from Glifada.

==== Central Library ====
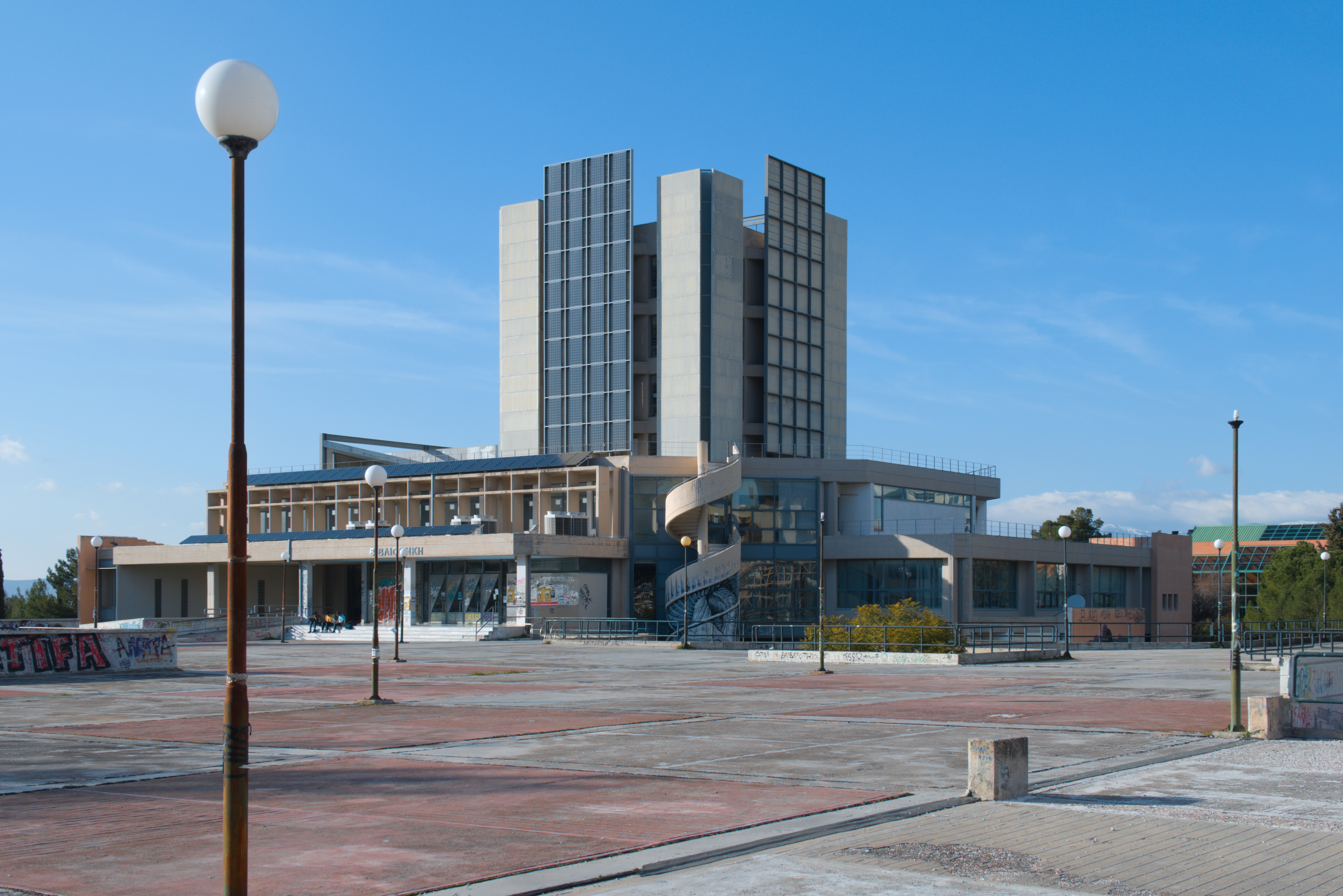
Central Library of National Technical University of Athens

On the campus lies the NTUA Central Library, which has operated since 1914, and was the first library in Greece with a complete index. Today, it remains one of the largest technical libraries in the country, featuring a collection of over 215,000 books and 100,000 scientific issues. The library is available to the public at all times for studying, and available to students, faculty, and internal and external researchers for borrowing.

The central library building at Zografou campus houses also the historical library of NTUA as a special collection. This scientific-technical library is unique in Greece, and one of the most important in Europe, since it contains approximately 60,000 volumes and periodicals (1,096 titles) issued from the 17th century until 1950. The main bulk of NTUA's historical collection consists of old and rare books, pamphlets, maps, engravings and encyclopedias.

=== Other facilities ===
==== Lavrion Technological and Cultural Park (LTCP) ====
Lavrion Technological and Cultural Park (LTCP), is a body of scientific research, education, business and culture. Founded in place of the old French Mining Company of Lavrion (Compagnie Francaise des Mines du Laurium) in 1992, as a result of the initiative undertaken from the National Technical University of Athens.

LTCP aims at linking scientific and technological research conducted in Athens with the needs and interests of the business world, and to the realization of cultural events related to the promotion of the history and culture of the wider area of Lavreotiki, and the emergence of the history of activities in the past had developed in the maintenance of premises. The LTCP area is a unique monument of industrial architecture and archeology and placed him in a series of housing facilities for business and research excellence.

The services provided by LTCP as well as its renovated facilities, continue to support research, education and technology. Today, LTCP is essentially the only technology park in Attica, which specializes in areas – keys of modern applied technology, such as information technology, electronics technology, telecommunications, robotics, laser technology, environmental technology, energy, shipbuilding, marine technology, etc.

==== Institute of Communication and Computer Systems (ICCS) ====
Founded in 1989, Institute of Communication and Computer Systems (ICCS) is an independent, non-profit research organization dedicated to advancing the values, mission, and strategic goals of the National Technical University of Athens (NTUA). Scientific research at ICCS is structured around various interdisciplinary thematic areas, including AI and Smart Systems, Hardware and Software, Computer Networks, Mobile Communications, Control and Automation, Power Production, Transport and Distribution, Energy, Climate, Biomedical and Biomechanics, Information Systems, Management and Decision Support, and Photonics.

==== Metsovion Interdisciplinary Research Center (MIRC) ====
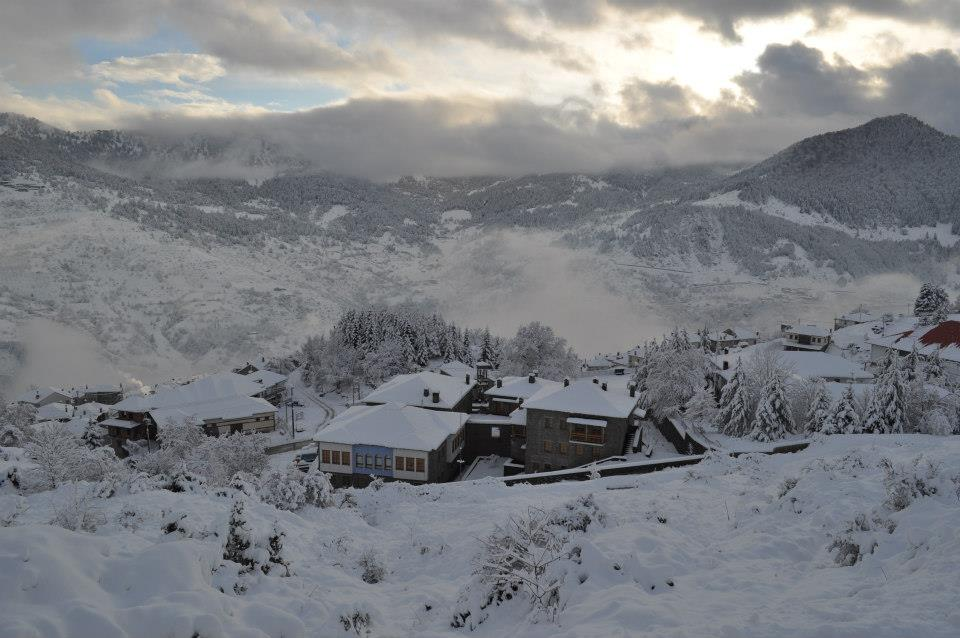
MIRC facilities at Metsovo

The Metsovion Interdisciplinary Research Center (MIRC) of the National Technical University of Athens for the Protection and Development of Mountainous Environment and Local European Cultures was founded in 1993 by decision of the National Technical University of Athens Senate, following the proposal of the then Rector professor Nikos Markatos.

The principal aim of MIRC is to contribute to the protection and development of mountainous environment and local European cultures and the provision of continuing education. As well as, the conduct of research, studies, seminars and conferences, relevant to the broader object of MIRC, the creation of a European network with related organizations under the aegis of the center or the participation in already existing networks. The above will be utilized by universities, cultural, research and productive organizations with the aim of assisting Metsovon in becoming a European center of decentralized interdisciplinary, educational, research, technological and cultural activities of NTUA.

== Culture ==
NTUA Choir – Lemonaki
The NTUA choir performing the folk greek song "Lemonaki" in a mixed choir rearrangement in 2010

=== Music Department ===
The NTUA Music Department was established in 1960 by Chancellor Alexander Pappas. The first president of the music department was composer Vassilis Makridis. It features a mixed choir, a string orchestra, and free lessons for various instruments, among others piano, guitar, bouzouki, and cello. The music department groups regularly perform publicly within the facilities of the university, but also elsewhere. At the moment, the department's president is conductor and composer Michalis Economou.

=== Dancing Department ===
The Dancing Department was established in 1990. It is formed by students, and it features various groups, including a Greek traditional and Cretan folk dances group, a European and Latin Ballroom dances group, a Salsa and a tango group. The groups meets weekly, and perform regularly inside and outside the facilities of the university. Attendance and dancing lessons are free for undergraduate and graduate students, alumni, faculty and even people not related to the university. The dancing department is housed near the center of the main campus.

=== Theatrical Group ===
The Theatrical Group was established in 1991. It is a self-managed group, which teaches the art of performance and often performs in public. Participation in the group is free for students. The theatrical group is housed near the center of the main campus. The theatrical group has also organized a separate percussion lessons group.

=== Sports ===
The main sports facilities of NTUA are housed in the Sports Center located to the south of the campus, taking up about 3,500 square meters. The campus sport facilities feature tennis and soccer courts, a field and track, a sauna, ping pong tables, and more. More than 40 sport teams exist, and the sports practiced include aerobics, yoga, Pilates, basketball, volleyball, soccer, handball, ping pong, tennis, martial arts inside the campus facilities and swimming, polo, rowing, yachting, rappelling, rafting, squash, wind surfing, and equestrianism outside.

Each year several inter-departmental championships are organized among the teams of the university faculties. NTUA student's teams have been distinguished and received many awards in Panhellenic University Games, as well as in university games abroad.

=== Open source ===
There is an open source students group whose purpose is to promote the use of open source software throughout the university and beyond. Furthermore, NTUA officially supports open source software by using it in its laboratories and other facilities, but also hosting mirrors for all major open source projects with a collection of over 2.5 terabytes of free and open source software.

=== Foreign languages ===
English and French are the languages taught in NTUA. All non-exchange students have to choose between the two as a mandatory foreign language course. For foreign students, the NTUA Linguistic Service offers the option of attending Greek courses during the entire academic year, free of charge. These courses are intended to provide students with the basic linguistic tools, so that they can understand and communicate efficiently with people in Greece.

== Participation in international organizations ==
- CESAER – Conference of European Schools for advanced Engineering, Education and Research
- EEGECS – Network on European Education in Geodetic Engineering, Cartography and Surveying
- SEFI – Societe Europeene pour la Formation des Ingenieurs (European Society for Engineering Education)
- TIME – Top Industrial Managers Europe

=== Student groups ===
- Prom Racing
- Prometheus Eco Racing
- White Noise
- Amphitronics
- Oceanos
- Aiolos
- Skaki
- Athens Local BEST Group
- Electrical Engineering STudent's European Association Local Committee of Athens (EESTEC)
- Euroavia
- International Association for the Exchange of Students for Technical Experience (IAESTE)

== Notable alumni ==
- Nicholas Ambraseys – professor of engineering seismology at Imperial College London
- Dimitris Anastassiou – developer of MPEG-2 algorithm for transmitting high quality audio and video over limited bandwidth and Columbia University professor of electrical engineering
- Dora E. Angelaki – professor of Neuroscience in the New York University Tandon School of Engineering
- John Argyris – one of the founders of the finite element method, professor at Imperial College London and University of Stuttgart
- Costas Azariadis – professor at the Department of Economics, UCLA and Edward Mallinckrodt Distinguished University professor in Arts & Sciences, Washington University in St. Louis
- Dimitri Bertsekas – professor of engineering at MIT
- Dimitris Bertsimas – professor in the Sloan School of Management at the Massachusetts Institute of Technology
- Charalambos Bouras – historian, professor of History of Architecture and restoration architect
- Georges Candilis – architect and urbanist, one of the founders of Team 10
- Giorgio de Chirico – Greek-born Italian artist and writer
- Constantine Dafermos – applied mathematician, professor at Brown University and recipient of Norbert Wiener Prize in Applied Mathematics
- Constantinos Daskalakis – computer scientist, professor at MIT
- Eleni Diamanti – electrical engineer and quantum-communications researcher at the French National Centre for Scientific Research, recipient of the 2024 CNRS Silver Medal and Innovation Medal.
- Athos Dimoulas – poet
- Eleftherios N. Economou – professor of Physics, former chairman of the
- Despo C. Fatta-Kassinos – environmental engineer, professor at University of Cyprus
- Georgios Gennimatas – former MP, minister and founding member of Panhellenic Socialist Movement
- Georgios B. Giannakis – computer scientist, engineer and inventor, professor of Wireless Telecommunications at the University of Minnesota
- John Iliopoulos – the first person to present the Standard Model of particle physics in a single report, recipient of the Dirac Medal
- Paris Kanellakis – computer scientist, professor at Brown University
- Linda P. B. Katehi – Chancellor of UC Davis
- Alexander S. Kechris – mathematician, professor at Caltech
- Loukianos Kilaidonis – composer, songwriter and singer
- Emmanouil Korres – professor, writer, restoration architect
- Georgios Lianis – professor and first Minister of Research and Technology (1982)
- Nikos Markatos – former Rector of the NTUA
- Dimitra Markovitsi – Photochemist, former president of the European Photochemistry Association
- Max Nikias – former president of the University of Southern California
- Constantine Papadakis – former president of Drexel University
- Christos Papadimitriou – computer scientist, laureate of the 2002 Knuth Prize for longstanding and seminal contributions to the foundations of computer science
- Panos Papalambros – professor emeritus of mechanical engineering at the University of Michigan, Ann Arbor
- Yannis Papathanasiou – politician, former Minister for Economy and Finance of Greece
- Athanasios Papoulis – engineer and applied mathematician
- Theodosios Pavlidis – computer scientist and Distinguished Professor Emeritus of Computer Science at the State University of New York, Stony Brook
- Nicholas A. Peppas – professor in engineering, University of Texas at Austin
- Aris Phillips – professor of mechanical engineering at Yale University
- Dimitris Pikionis – architect and painter
- George Prokopiou – billionaire shipowner
- Athanasios Roussopoulos – professor in applied statics and iron constructions at the National Technical University of Athens, where his work was mostly concerned with the development of the theory of aseismic structures, politician, member of the Greek Parliament and Minister of Public Works in 1966, he was also president of the Technical Chamber of Greece
- Joseph Sifakis – computer scientist, laureate of the 2007 Turing Award for his work on model checking.
- John Travlos – architect, architectural historian, and archaeologist
- Michael Triantafyllou – professor of mechanical and ocean engineering at MIT
- Alexandros Tombazis – architect
- Alexis Tsipras – former prime minister of Greece
- Ioannis Vardoulakis – professor of civil engineering at University of Minnesota and at NTUA, a pioneer of theoretical and experimental geomechanics
- Iannis Xenakis – one of the most important post-war avant-garde composers, pioneer of the use of mathematical models in music and architect
- Mihalis Yannakakis – computer scientist, laureate of the 2005 Knuth Prize for numerous ground-breaking contributions to theoretical computer science
- Thaleia Zariphopoulou – mathematician, professor of Finance at the University of Texas at Austin
- Mihail Zervos – professor of financial mathematics at London School of Economics
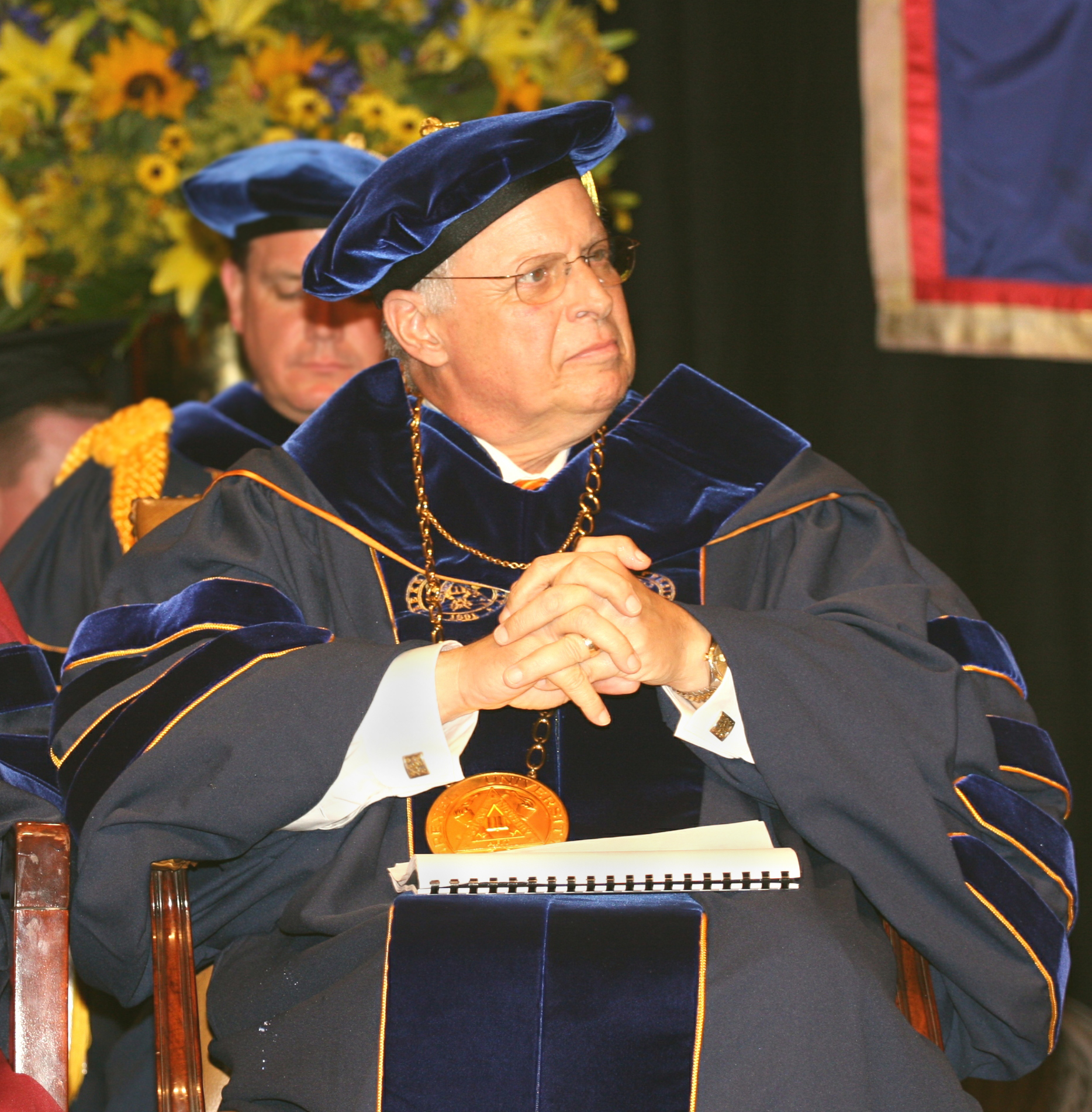
President of Drexel University Constantine Papadakis, Civil '69

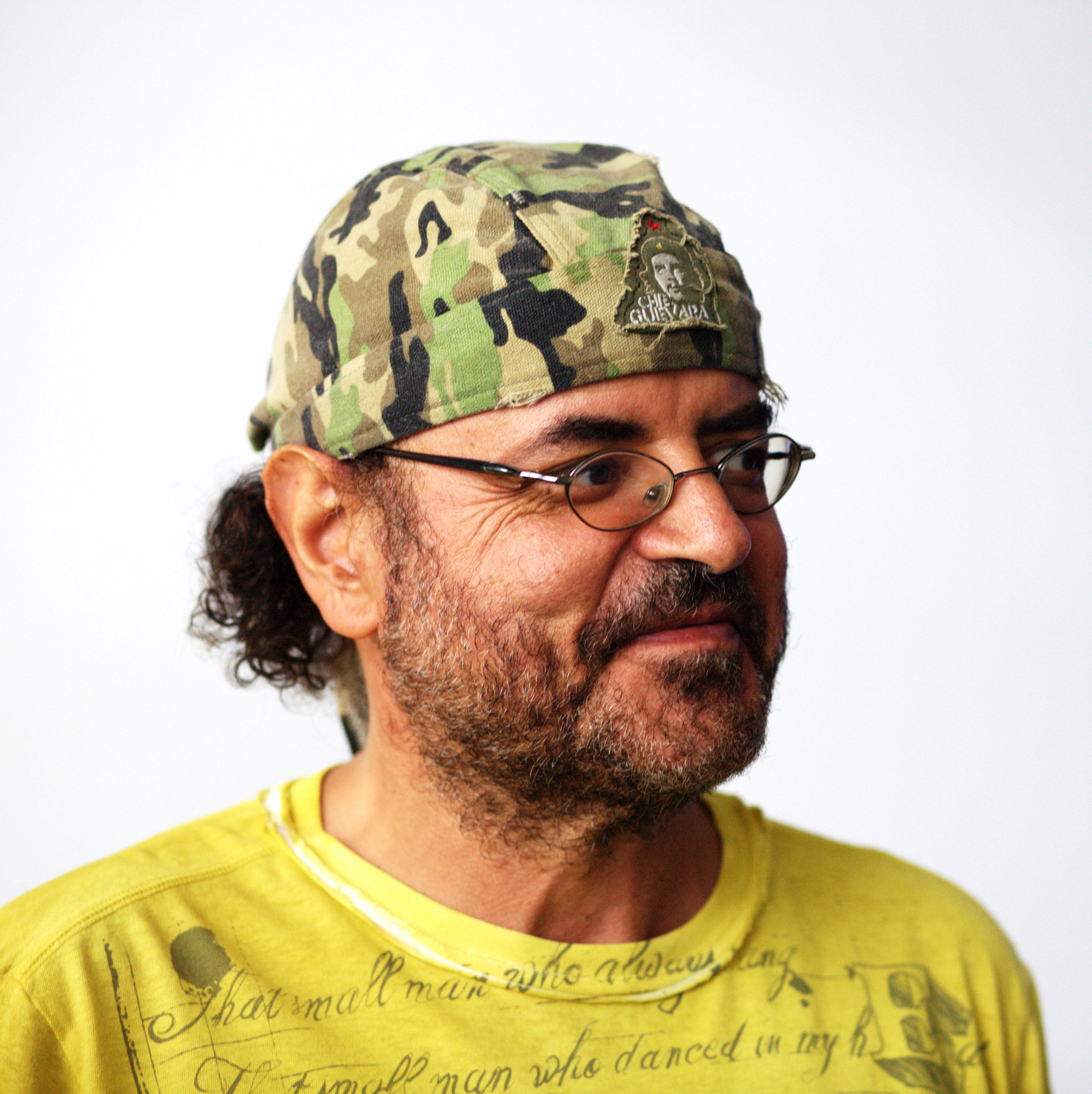
Computational Complexity author Christos Papadimitriou, ECE '72

Nicholas A. Peppas, Chemical '71

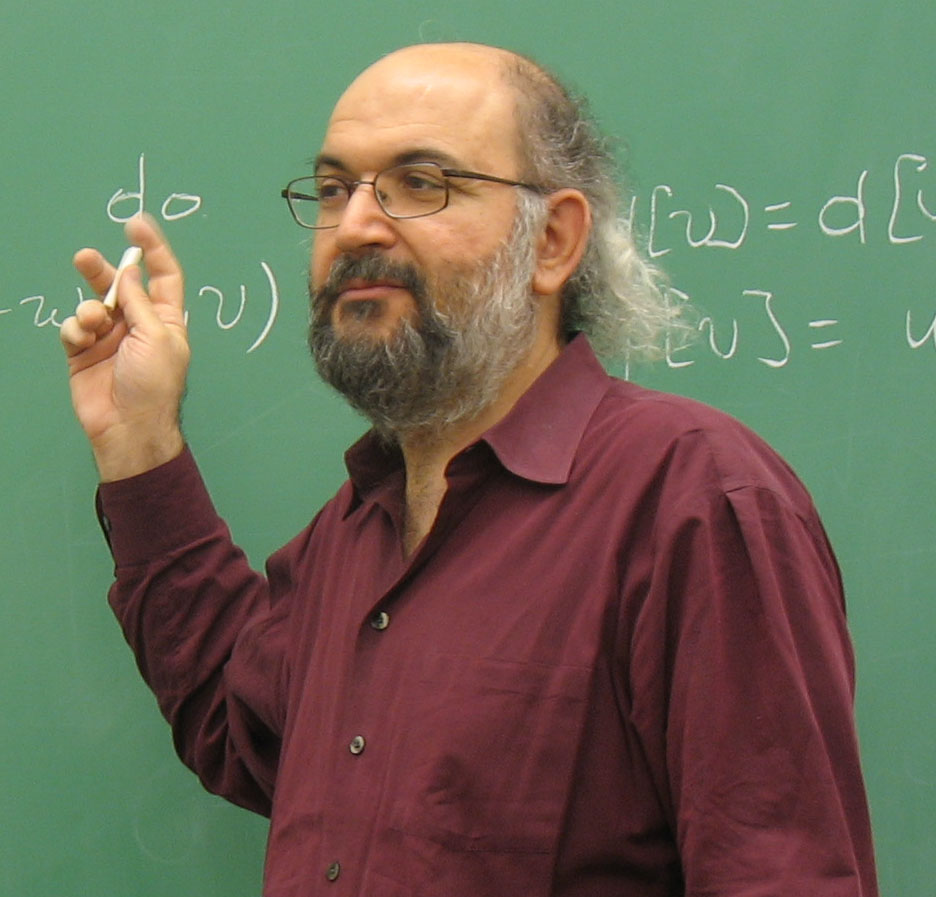
Knuth Prize 2005 winner Mihalis Yannakakis, ECE '75

== See also ==
- Athens Polytechnic uprising
- Polytechnic (Greece)
- List of universities in Greece
- Top Industrial Managers for Europe
- Open access in Greece

== Bibliography ==
- Volkert, Klaus; Menghini, Marta; Barbin, Évelyne (2019). Descriptive Geometry, The Spread of a Polytechnic Art The Legacy of Gaspard Monge. Cham, Switzerland: Springer International Publishing. ISBN 9783030148089.
