= Michael Triantafyllou =

Michael Triantafyllou is Professor of Mechanical and Ocean Engineering in the Department of Mechanical Engineering, Director of the Center for Ocean Engineering, Head of the Area of Ocean Science and Engineering, and Director of the Testing Tank and Propeller Tunnel Facilities at the Massachusetts Institute of Technology (MIT). He is best known for his work on underwater robots, based upon and emulating the performance of fish, including the six-foot laboratory robot the RoboTuna (part of a permanent exhibition at the Science Museum in London since 1998), the free-swimming RoboPike (1998), and the RoboTurtle (2005).

Triantafyllou was born and grew up in Athens, Greece. After graduating from the National Technical University of Athens in 1974 (Naval Architecture and Marine Engineering), he continued with graduate studies at MIT. In 1977 he graduated with a dual S.M. in Ocean Engineering and Mechanical Engineering in 1977, followed in 1979 by an Sc.D. in Ocean Engineering. Upon receiving his doctorate, Triantafyllou took up a teaching post at MIT in the Department of Ocean Engineering.

Triantafyllou has been a visiting scientist at the Woods Hole Oceanographic Institution, Chairman of the Joint MIT/WHOI Program Committee in Oceanographic Engineering, and visiting professor at the National Technical University of Athens in Greece, Kyushu University in Japan, the Norwegian University of Science and Technology in Trondheim, Norway, and ETH Zurich in Switzerland.

"The main focus of his recent research has been on flow control, vortex-induced vibrations, and biomimetics, the discipline that explores what can be learned about the physics of underwater propulsion from live animals."

== Sources ==
- Center for Ocean Engineering
- "Ask the Scientists" — interview
