= Sompeta railway station =

Railway station in Andhra Pradesh

Sompeta
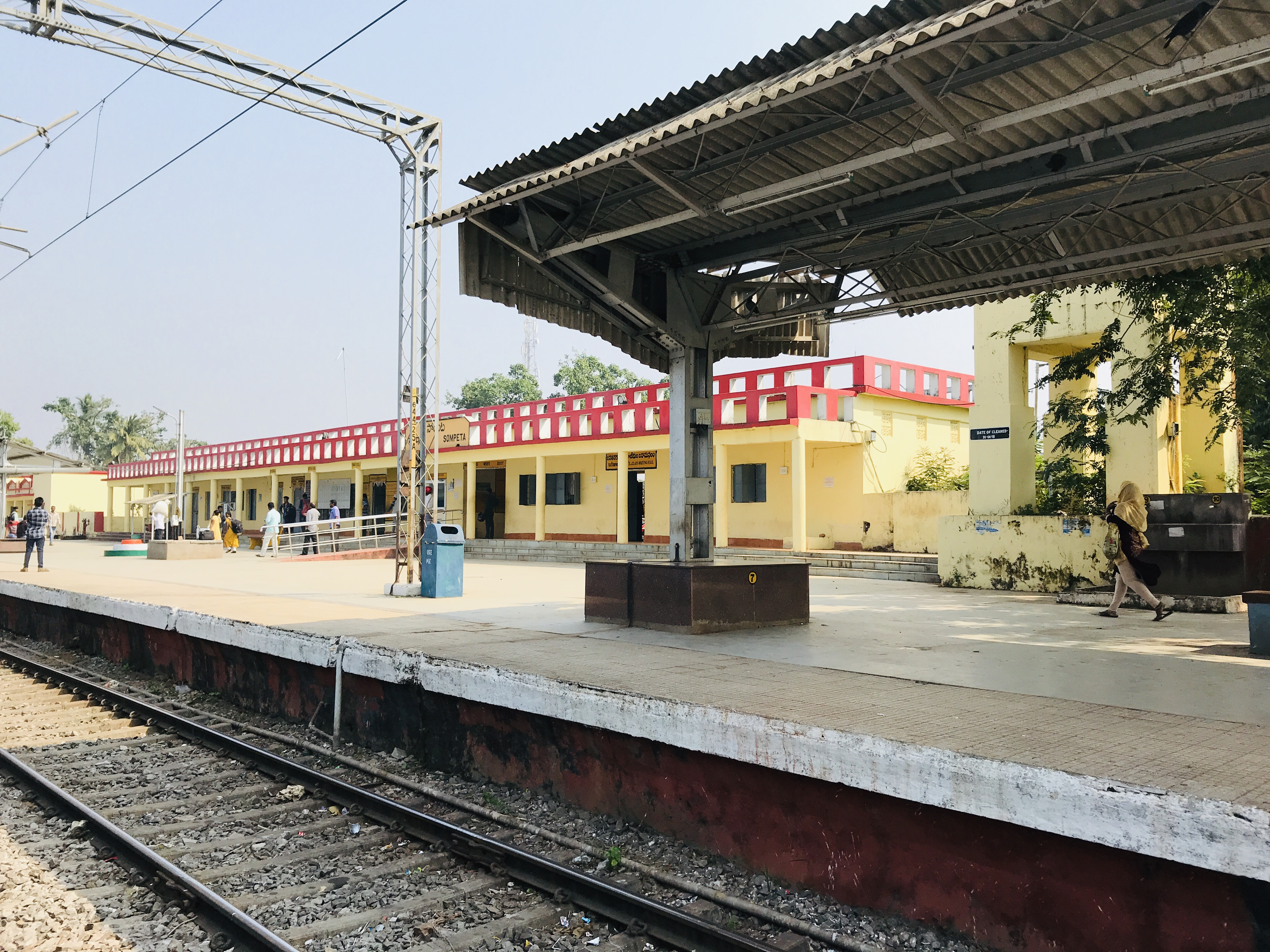
- Platform 1 of Sompeta station

General information
- Location: Main Road, Kanchili, Srikakulam distt., Andhra Pradesh; India
- Coordinates: 18°58′52″N 84°34′59″E
- Elevation: 48 m (157 ft)
- System: Indian Railways junction station
- Lines: Khurda Road–Visakhapatnam section of Howrah–Chennai main line
- Platforms: 4
- Tracks: 5 ft 6 in (1,676 mm) broad gauge

Construction
- Structure type: Standard on-ground station
- Parking: Available

Other information
- Status: Active
- Station code: SPT
- Zone(s): South Coast Railway
- Division(s): Visakhapatnam

History
- Opened: 1893–96
- Electrified: 1998–99
Location
- Location within Andhra Pradesh Location within India

Sompeta railway station (station code:SPT) is located in the Indian state of Andhra Pradesh. It serves Sompeta-kanchili, Kaviti and surrounding areas in Srikakulam district.

It is a major hub for regions around Sompeta and Kanchili. It is situated in Kanchili (Telugu: కంచిలి), a village and a Mandal in Srikakulam district in Andhra Pradesh. In this station 14 Superfast trains, 18 Express trains and 6 Passenger trains halt in this station in both directions.

== History ==
This station was built during the period 1893–1896, supporting 1,287 km (800 mi) of railway tracks covering the coastal area from Cuttack to Vijayawada. It was built and opened to traffic by East Coast State Railway. Later in 1900s this was handed over to Bengal Nagpur Railway (BNR). When India became independent the station came under jurisdiction of South Eastern Railway. After 2003, as per restricting of Indian railways zones, the station fell under jurisdiction of East Coast Railway.

The Bengal Nagpur Railway was nationalised in 1944. The Eastern Railway was formed on 14 April 1952, with the portion of East Indian Railway Company east of Mughalsarai and the Bengal Nagpur Railway. In 1955, South Eastern Railway was carved out of Eastern Railway. It comprised lines mostly operated by BNR earlier. Among the new zones were East Coast Railway and South East Central Railway. Both these railways were carved out of South Eastern Railway

== Amenities ==
This station has a First Class waiting hall, computerised reservation offices, II class waiting room, footbridge, and a public address system. A computerized reservation counter is available from 08:00Hrs to 20:00Hrs.

This station has 4 platforms.

== Administration ==
This station is staffed by a station superintendent, three station masters, ten traffic pointsmen, and three booking clerks. The station superintendent is in overall charge of the station, and is responsible for all aspects of station maintenance, staff administration, and commercial statistics.

The station contains the office of a senior section engineer for the railway. The permanent way (PWAY) works for tracks and gate is located here.
