= Bible Society of India Andhra Pradesh Auxiliary =

Religious organisation in India

- Formation: 1951
- Founded at: Secunderabad
- Type: Bible Society
- Legal status: Charitable trust
- Purpose: Literary
- Headquarters: Bangalore
- Location: Guntur
- Region served: Andhra Pradesh
- Services: Raising contribution, translating, printing, distribution
- Official language: Telugu
- Auxiliary Secretary: The Rev. K. John Vikram, CSI, M. Th. (Yonsei)
- President: Medidi Johnson
- Key people: The Rev. M. Mani Chacko, CSI, PhD (London), General Secretary of the BSI, Bangalore
- Main organ: India Bible Society Trust Association
- Parent organization: Bible Society of India
- Subsidiaries: 1 (Visakhapatnam)
- Affiliations: United Bible Societies
- Budget: Rs. 1.10,00,000.00 (2014)
- Website: http://www.bsind.org/andhra_pradesh.html
- Formerly called: Book Depot of the Tamil Nadu Auxiliary

The Bible Society of India Andhra Pradesh Auxiliary is located in Guntur.

From 1951 through 2016, the Andhra Pradesh Auxiliary was housed at the Bible House on Rashtrapathi Road in Secunderabad until it was moved to Guntur. This Auxiliary assists the Translations Department of the BSI to translate the Scriptures into the languages spoken in the state of Andhra Pradesh that include not only Telugu language, but also Urdu language, Lambadi language and other minority linguistic groups.

== Telugu version ==
In the Annual report of the British & Foreign Bible Society John Hay had undertaken the revision of the Telugu Bible (of Lyman Jewett?). In the same report, mention was made of the Secunderabad Branch.

In 1953, the Telugu Bible was revised from earlier version which had been translated by John Hay, Edward Pritchett, John Smith Wardlaw (1813–), James William Gordon, John Redmond Bacon and Dhanavada Anantam.

The Rev. A. B. Masilamani who majored in Greek at Serampore College was Auxiliary Secretary as well part of the Translation Team providing stylistic corrections in Telugu. Modern translations of the Telugu Bible in common language were taken up by The Rev. Victor Premasagar and The Rev. G. Babu Rao, both of whom were Scholars of Biblical Hebrew and Biblical Greek as well as colleagues at the Protestant Regional Theologiate in Secunderabad.

During the Auxiliary Secretaryship of The Rev. B. G. Prasada Rao, a team consisting of The Rev. Suppogu Israel and The Rev. G. Babu Rao began translating portions of the Bible into modern Telugu which included,

- Portions translated into modern Telugu
  - Book of Ruth, 1976
  - Man You Cannot Ignore, 1976

Old Testament Scholar, The Rev. Graham S. Ogden, Asia-Pacific Regional Translations Coordinator of the United Bible Societies used to liaise with the Auxiliary during the Secretaryship of The Rev. L. Prakasam, providing scholarly inputs and also reviewing the progress of the Telugu-Old Testament Common Language Project Coordinator, The Rev. G. Babu Rao in the presence of the Old Testament Scholar, The Rev. G. D. V. Prasad, then Director – Translations of the Bible Society of India.

A Living Bible in Telugu was also proposed as early as 1980.

== Lambadi version ==
The Auxiliary released the New Testament in Lambadi language on 25 October 1999 in the presence of then Auxiliary Secretary, The Rev. G. Babu Rao, then Director – Translations of the Bible Society of India, Central Office, Bengaluru, The Rev. G. D. V. Prasad and then General Secretary, B. K. Pramanik at the STBC-Centenary Baptist Church, Secunderabad under the shepherdship of Pastor N. Thomas. Speaking at the release, Pastor Lazarus Lalsingh of Badao Banjara Phojer who put in efforts for bringing the New Testament in Lambadi recalled the earlier efforts of The Rev. B. E. Devaraj in translating texts into Lambadi at the release in 1999.

== Auxiliary Secretaries ==
The first Auxiliary Secretary was appointed in the 1950s beginning with The Rev. E. Prakasam, AELC who served till the 1960s, followed by The Rev. A. B. Masilamani, CBCNC, both of whom were hymn writers. During the 1970s, The Rev. B. G. Prasada Rao, CSI who was one of the first postgraduates in theology at the United Theological College, Bangalore led the Auxiliary till the 1980s and was followed by The Rev. T. B. D. Prakasa Rao, CSI who had an inter-disciplinary academic record at three different universities, who was succeeded in the 1990s by The Rev. L. Prakasam, CBCNC who had substantial ministerial track.

When the 21st century began, Old Testament Scholar, The Rev. G. Babu Rao was already at the helm since the concluding years' of 1990s and had also led the Telugu language Old Testament common language translations of the Bible Society of India since the 1970s, and was succeeded as Auxiliary Secretary by The Rev. N. L. Victor of the Salvation Army in the 2000s. In the beginning of 2010s, The Rev. B. S. Rajashekar, STBC took over as Auxiliary Secretary and was followed by and The Rev. K. John Vikram, CSI, who was installed in 2020s.

Tenure	Auxiliary Secretaries of Andhra Pradesh Auxiliary {From AP (1956–2014) to present-day AP}	Earned Academic Credentials
1953–1963	The Rev. E. Prakasam, AELC	L. Th. (Serampore)
1963–1969	The Rev. A. B. Masilamani, CBCNC	L. Th. (Serampore), B. D. (Serampore), M. A. (Calcutta), Th. M. (Toronto), PhD (Osmania)
1969–1976	The Rev. B. G. Prasada Rao, CSI	B. D. (Serampore), M. Th. (Serampore)
1976–1981	The Rev. T. B. D. Prakasa Rao, CSI	B. A. (Andhra), B. D. (Serampore), M. A. (Osmania), BEd (Andhra)
1981–1998	The Rev. L. Prakasam, CBCNC	L. Th. (Serampore)
1998–2001	The Rev. G. Babu Rao, CBCNC	BSc (Andhra),^{Double majors in Mathematics} B. D. (Serampore), M. Th. (Serampore)
2001–2012	The Rev. N. L. Victor, SA	B. A.
2012–2020	The Rev. B. S. Rajashekar, STBC	B. Com. (Nagarjuna), B. D. (Serampore), M. Th. (Serampore)^{Double Masters}
2020–present	The Rev. K. John Vikram, CSI	BSc (Andhra), MSc (Andhra), B. D. (Serampore), M. Th. (Yonsei)
