= Kanchili =

- Village
- Interactive map of Kanchili
- Location in Andhra Pradesh, India Kanchili (India)
- Coordinates: 18.981°N 84.582°E
- Country: India
- State: Andhra Pradesh
- District: Srikakulam
- Talukas: Kanchili

Languages
  - Official: Telugu
- Time zone: UTC+5:30 (IST)
- PIN: 532 290
- Telephone code: 08947
- Vehicle Registration: AP30 (Former); AP39 (from 30 January 2019)
- Lok Sabha constituency: Srikakulam
- Vidhan Sabha constituency: Ichchapuram

Kanchili is a village and headquarters in Kanchili mandal, Srikakulam district of the Indian state of Andhra Pradesh.

Kanchili mandal is bordered by Kaviti mandal to the north, Odisha state to the west and Sompeta mandal to the south and east.

== Demographics ==
As per the Indian census in 2011, the demographic details of Kanchili mandal is as follows:

- Total population: 3,837; in 810 households
- Male population: 2,144
- Female population: 1,693
- Child population (age 0-6): 363
- Literacy rate: 71.1% (male: 81.31%; female: 57.81%)

== Etymology ==
"Kanchili" village has acquired its name from the local village deity "Kanchamma" who is worshiped with devotion by the locals. The residents of Kanchili, as a matter of their social and moral responsibility, renovated the old temple of goddess 'Kanchamma'.

== Transport ==
It has a railway station; it is named after a neighboring large mandal "Sompeta Railway Station". Most of the trains passing through the Howrah - Chennai route halt here. This railway station falls under the South Coast Railway zones. The railway serves as a major transportation of this village. NH-5 Passes through this village. APSRTC runs a plenty of buses through this village connecting to many cities and villages.
