= Ashok Bendalam =

Indian politician

Member of the Andhra Pradesh Legislative Assembly
- Incumbent
- Assumed office 2014
- Preceded by: Piriya Sairaj
- Constituency: Ichchapuram

Personal details
- Party: Telugu Desam Party

Ashok Bendalam is an Indian politician from Andhra Pradesh. He is a member of the Andhra Pradesh Legislative Assembly from the Ichchapuram Assembly constituency representing the Telugu Desam Party (TDP) since 2014. He won for a third time as an MLA, in the 2024 Andhra Pradesh Legislative Assembly election. He was appointed whip on 12 November 2024.

== Career ==
Bendalam acted as the in-charge for TDP in Ichchapuram. He won the 2014 Andhra Pradesh Legislative Assembly election and retained the seat in the 2019 election. He represented Telugu Desam Party from the Ichchapuram Assembly constituency.
