= B. E. Devaraj =

Indian translator

- Education: M. A., L.Th.

Ecclesiastical career
- Church: Church of South India, (Diocese of Nandyal)
- Ordained: 1948
- Writings: See Section
- Offices held: Lecturer, Andhra Christian Theological College, Rajahmundry, South India
- Title: Reverend

B. E. Devaraj was a translator who pioneered the Lambadi version of the New Testament. He was Acting Commissary and Vicar General of the Archdeaconry of Nandyal from 1950 to 1951.

Devaraj also taught in the Andhra Christian Theological College, Rajahmundry {affiliated to the Senate of Serampore College (University) - a university within the meaning of Section 2 (f) of the University Grants Commission Act, 1956 (as modified up to 20 December 1985)}.

Ravela Joseph who compiled a bibliography of original Christian writings in Telugu with the assistance of B. Suneel Bhanu under the aegis of the Board of Theological Education of the Senate of Serampore College included books by B. E. Devaraj entitled A Commentary on First Corinthians (మొదటి కొరింథీ పత్రిక వ్యాఖ్యానము), Good Friday (మoఛి శుక్రవారము), and Love's Servant (ప్రెమదాసు).

The Bible Society of India Andhra Pradesh Auxiliary released the New Testament in Lambadi on 25 October 1999 in the presence of G. Babu Rao, then Auxiliary Secretary, G. D. V. Prasad, Director - Translations of the Bible Society of India, Central Office, Bengaluru and B. K. Pramanik, its General Secretary. Lazarus Lalsingh of Badao Banjara Phojer who put in efforts for bringing the New Testament in Lambadi recalled the earlier efforts of B. E. Devaraj in translating texts into Lambadi at the release in 1999.

== Contribution ==
- Books in Telugu
  - 1949 - Religious Lessons
  - 1956 - Good Friday (మoఛి శుక్రవారము)
  - 1960 - Gospel of St. Mark in simplified Telugu
  - 1967 - Love's Servant (ప్రెమదాసు).
  - 1969 - History of the Church in India,
  - 1973 - A Commentary on First Corinthians (మొదటి కొరింథీ పత్రిక వ్యాఖ్యానము)
- Books in Lambadi (Translations)
  - 1963 - Gospel According to St. Mark
  - 1966 - Gospel According to St. Luke
- Books in Lambadi (Translations with Special Titles)
  - 1974 - Way of Hope, The Gospel According to St. Mark
  - 1975 - Way of Peace, The Gospel according to St. Luke
  - 1976 - Way of Life, The Gospel According to St. John

== History and studies ==
Devaraj attended the local S.P.G. School in Nandyal and then graduated from the Noble College in Machilipatnam in 1920 where he took a B.A. He also studied for an M.A. at the Madras University in 1929, eventually became principal of a Training School in Nandyal.

During 1946–1947, Devaraj attended a special course at the United Theological College, Bengaluru and was ordained as an Anglican Priest in 1948.

== Reminisce ==
Talathoti Punnaiah who studied a 3-year theology course leading to Bachelor of Theology at the Andhra Christian Theological College, both at Rajahmundry and at Hyderabad from 1970 to 1973 recalls his association with B. E. Devaraj:

Devaraj was Bursar of the College and a senior most among the faculty hailing from an Anglican background, very active and healthy. He was very good in Telugu and composed the Hymn 484 appearing in the Christian Hymnal in Telugu. He was very particular in grammar pronunciation. As I studied in Madras and had Tamil slang, I was afraid to read the Telugu book in the class. Later on, I understood the importance of Telugu language through his Telugu class and I improved my Telugu vocabulary, expression and accent.

Professional and academic associations
Preceded by -	Translator Bible Society of India Andhra Pradesh Auxiliary	Succeeded by -
Academic offices
Preceded by -	Lecturer; Andhra Christian Theological College, Rajahmundry; 1964 -	Succeeded by
Religious titles
Preceded by	Vicar; Church of India, Pakistan, Burma and Ceylon (Diocese of Calcutta, Archdeaconry of Nandyal)	Succeeded by
Preceded by E. J. Wyld; Commissary; 1948 - 1950	Acting Commissary and Vicar General; Archdeaconry of Nandyal; Diocese of Calcutta; Church of India, Pakistan, Burma and Ceylon; 1950 - 1951	Succeeded by William Arthur Patridge; Commissary; 1951 - 1963
