= Dual degree =

Two academic or professional degrees in parallel study

Joint degrees are academic qualifications awarded through integrated study programmes jointly designed, coordinated, and delivered by two or more higher education institutions. These institutions may be located within the same country or across different national education systems. Depending on the structure of the programme and the applicable legal frameworks, graduates may receive a single joint qualification, two separate qualifications (commonly referred to as a double degree or dual degree), or multiple national diplomas awarded for a single coordinated course of study.

Joint degrees differ from standard national qualifications in that they are based on shared curricula, coordinated quality assurance procedures, and mutual recognition of academic work across participating institutions. They are often used as instruments of academic cooperation and internationalisation in higher education.

== Background ==
The development of joint degrees is closely linked to broader efforts to enhance cross-border cooperation in higher education. In Europe, joint degrees emerged prominently in the late 1990s within the context of the Bologna Process, which aimed to improve the comparability, compatibility, and transparency of national higher education systems.

The Council of Europe and the European Commission have actively promoted joint programmes as tools for strengthening academic mobility, fostering institutional partnerships, and facilitating the recognition of qualifications across borders.

Outside Europe, joint and dual degree programmes have expanded through bilateral agreements between universities in different regions, particularly between North America, Europe, and East Asia, often supported by national or supranational mobility schemes.

== Types of joint qualifications ==
Joint programmes may lead to different forms of academic certification, depending on institutional arrangements and national legislation.

=== Joint degree ===
A joint degree is a single qualification jointly awarded by two or more higher education institutions. The diploma is issued collectively and usually bears the names, logos, and signatures of all participating institutions. Legal recognition of joint degrees depends on whether national regulations explicitly allow the issuance of a single diploma by multiple institutions.

=== Double or dual degree ===
A double degree (or dual degree) programme results in two separate academic qualifications, each awarded by one of the participating institutions. Although the curriculum is coordinated, each institution issues its own diploma in accordance with its national education system. This model is more widely used where joint diplomas are not legally recognised.

== Programme structure ==
Joint and double degree programmes typically involve:

- a jointly agreed curriculum and learning outcomes;
- mandatory mobility periods at partner institutions;
- mutual recognition of courses and credits;
- coordinated supervision of final projects or theses.

The overall duration of study may be equivalent to that of a standard degree or slightly extended, but joint programmes are generally designed to avoid duplication of coursework.

== Quality assurance ==
Quality assurance for joint degree programmes is often more complex than for national programmes, as it involves multiple accreditation agencies and regulatory frameworks. In the European context, quality assurance is guided by the Standards and Guidelines for Quality Assurance in the European Higher Education Area (ESG).

Some countries have introduced specific procedures to allow a single external evaluation of joint programmes, reducing administrative burdens and ensuring consistent academic standards.

== Recognition ==
Recognition of joint and double degrees depends on national legislation and international agreements. In Europe, the Lisbon Recognition Convention provides a legal framework for the recognition of qualifications resulting from joint programmes, encouraging fair and transparent evaluation by competent authorities.

== Advantages and challenges ==
Joint degree programmes are often associated with enhanced international exposure, interdisciplinary learning, and improved employability. They may also strengthen institutional cooperation and contribute to curriculum innovation.

At the same time, challenges include administrative complexity, differences in academic calendars and grading systems, legal constraints on joint diplomas, and higher financial and organisational demands on both institutions and students.

== See also ==
- Academic major
- Double majors in the United States
- Interdisciplinarity
- Bologna Process
- European Higher Education Area
- Academic mobility
