= Multiple major in the United States =

In the United States, a multiple major refers to an academic program in which an undergraduate student fulfills the requirements for two or more distinct disciplines or fields of study, receiving a single bachelor's degree with all majors listed on the diploma or transcript. This practice allows students to pursue diverse interests or enhance their career prospects by demonstrating expertise in multiple areas.

Unlike dual degrees, which involve completing two separate degrees and often require more time and credits, a double major typically fits within the standard time frame for a bachelor's degree. In the United States, undergraduate programs toward a bachelor's degree often follow a liberal arts model, and have a set group or type of coursework (sometimes called distribution or core requirements) together with a specialization, called a major—a double major would usually complete one set of the core requirements and two sets of the degree specialization requirements.

Increasing numbers of college students in the United States are accumulating more than one major, with an estimated 25% of college graduates with more than one major. Some schools report that 30% to 40% of their undergraduates are double majors. The added benefits of a second major include the opportunity to increase student knowledge and the expectation of increased earnings and competitiveness. Students cite enjoying the coursework, gaining parental approval, and finding a job after graduation as the three most important reasons for pursuing a second major. Additionally, the pursuit of a double major can be an “identity project” by which students appear to focus on their “low status” major as their “core identity,” while their high status major is used when discussing their education with parents and potential employers.

== Types ==
A 2008 study found that 27% of double majors had two arts/social science majors, 14% had two business majors, while 39% had two majors that crossed disciplinary categories. Some first majors lend themselves to greater likelihood of acquiring a second. Business Administration, Social Science and Education majors are the most likely to have pursued a second major. According to the Teagle Report, the ten most popular concentrations for double majors are:

1. Foreign Languages
2. Economics
3. Business
4. Engineering
5. Political Science
6. Biology
7. Psychology
8. English
9. History
10. Mathematics

In addition, the ten most popular double major combinations are:

1. Two Different Business Majors
2. Foreign Language and International Studies
3. Foreign Language and Political Science
4. Economics and Mathematics
5. Economics and Political Science
6. Foreign Language and Biology
7. Foreign Language and Economics
8. Foreign Language and Business
9. Economics and Engineering
10. Foreign Language and Psychology.

== Breadth versus depth ==
The goal of many colleges and universities is to produce students of a wide breadth of knowledge, an aim that is evident in the implementation of general education courses and other similar curricular requirements. An additional major suggests a greater likelihood of achieving this and researchers have begun to unpack the relationship between double majors and their knowledge base. A study, in particular, identify two kinds of double majors – those who “hyper-specialize” and those who “hypo-specialize.” Hyper-specialists are those who have both majors in similar academic fields (e.g., psychology and sociology), while hypo-specialists have majors in distinct fields (e.g., English and chemistry). Most double majors are hypo-specialists, but close to a third of double majors hyper-specialize.

Double majors who hyper-specialize are predictably more concentrated in their knowledge base as a result of taking courses in areas that overlap whereas hypo-specialists would appear to have more breadth in their courses. Hyper-specialization, however, has different impacts upon knowledge breadth depending upon field of study. Humanities double majors, for example, see no difference in breadth exposure regardless of whether their second major is similar or dissimilar. This provides a stark contrast to social and natural science double majors who see a negative impact to hyper-specialization in terms of acquiring a broad range of knowledge.

== Effect on earnings and other labor market outcomes ==
Post-graduation earnings vary widely for double majors. Studies have estimated that a double major experiences a benefit of approximately 2.3% to 3.4% to their earnings compared to single majors. A major in the science, technology, engineering or mathematics, either as a single major or part of a double major, fared appreciably better than other double-major combinations. Students double majoring in engineering and natural sciences earned an average salary of $78,342; those double majoring in education and a social science earned $45,491.

A double major is directly beneficial for those who only have a bachelor's degree. Double majors who go on to complete a graduate degree see no difference in earnings than those with a single major, controlling for field and level of degree.

There is much inconsistency when it comes to economic returns to a second major. The greatest gains in earnings come when the two majors are in different fields (hypo-specialization), with the highest returns being among those who opt for technical majors. An arts/social science or education pairing with a business or math/science has greater earning potential than a single arts/social science or education major – although, adding an arts/social science or education major with a business or math/science degree offers no greater rewards than a single major in either of those fields. On the contrary, it appears that an education and math/science pairing results in ‘‘lower’’ earnings compared to a single math/science major. The greatest earnings appear to be for those who opt for an engineering– math/science pairing. Compared to those with only the math/science major, double majors have returns of up to 30 percentage points. The most profitable second majors, regardless of the first major, appear to be Business and Administration, Computer Science, and Engineering. In some cases, gender appears to matter greatly. Female engineering-math/science double majors, for example, have greater earning returns than males. On the other hand, Males do not suffer the earnings penalty that female education double majors often do. Differences in earnings also appear across types of institutions. Liberal Arts colleges, where close to a third of students have two majors, the return to earnings are small and insignificant. In contrast, a 3.9% premium appears for double majors from Research institutions, where less than a quarter of students add a second major.

== Differences between single and double majors ==
In terms of collegiate experiences, studies have found a number of differences between single and double majors. Compared to their single major peers, double majors appear to be more involved in extracurricular activities, more likely to hold positions in student organizations, and more likely to pursue academic interests (research projects with faculty or honors thesis) outside the classroom. Double majors, on average, have higher GPAs than single majors. In fact, students with GPAs of 3.5 or higher are more than twice as likely to double major. 27% of them even have a minor. Students who expect to go to graduate school are 72% more likely to pursue a double major, and these students are also twice as likely to say they plan on pursuing a Ph.D. than their single major peers. This reflects post-baccalaureate pursuits, as 23.4% of individuals with just bachelor's degrees were double majors, compared to 24.9% of those who have graduate degrees.

== Class and gender ==
An estimated 25% of women are double majors, compared to 22% of men, although most studies show generally no difference between men and women. Double majoring can provide an added benefit for women, who often balance differing expectations when it comes to major selection. On the one hand, traditional gender socialization lends itself to less financially lucrative majors (those in the humanities, for example). On the other hand, the promise of financial rewards (as well as parental pressure) may push many women towards the science, technology, engineering and mathematics majors. Combinations of double majors differed largely by gender, with men likely to pair business or economics with a second major while women often pair a foreign language or psychology with a second major. Moreover, women often emphasized that a double major makes them more marketable to prospective employers and to graduate programs, especially if their majors appear to come from two unrelated fields.

The top double major combinations for men are as follows:

1. Two Different Business Majors
2. Economics and Engineering
3. Economics and Political Science
4. Economics and Foreign Language
5. Economics and Mathematics
6. Engineering and Mathematics
7. Economics and Business
8. Political Science and Philosophy
9. Engineering and Computer Science
10. Foreign Language and International Studies.

The most popular double major combinations for women are:

1. Foreign Language and International Studies
2. Foreign Language and Political Science
3. Foreign Language and Psychology
4. Foreign Language and Human Development
5. Foreign Language and Biology
6. Foreign Language and Business
7. Two Different Business Majors
8. Art and Psychology
9. Foreign Language and English
10. Biology and Psychology.

Some differences appear between single and double majors in terms of family and educational background, although less than perhaps might be expected. Double majors are more likely to come from wealthy families, have at least one parent with a bachelor's degree, and are less likely to work than their single major peers. Furthermore, double majors are slightly more likely to have graduated from a private high school and have taken more AP classes.

== The role of institutions ==
Institutions vary largely in their percentage of double majors. Public schools appear to have close to twice the amount of double majors than private schools, in part because they tend to offer a broader array of subjects and classes. Larger schools, however, see decreases of about 1.25% in double majors for every additional 1500 students compared to smaller schools. The greatest increase in the number of double majors appears to be happening at the most selective colleges. Schools with higher percentages of students with student loans see decreases in the number of double majors compared to more affluent universities. Campuses that are predominantly white, have mostly traditional-aged students (18-24), and are more selective (25% of incoming freshmen score at least 1200 or more on the SAT) have more double majors than other campuses. Likewise, an estimated $6800 increase in tuition is associated with a 1% increase in double majors. Different institution types may also vary in the culture surrounding double majors. In liberal arts institutions, for example, an estimated 30% of all students pick up a second major compared to research institutions where only 22% of students double-up.
