= Kaviti =

- Village
- Interactive map of Kaviti
- Location in Andhra Pradesh, India Kaviti (India)
- Coordinates: 19.0167°N 84.6833°E
- Country: India
- State: Andhra Pradesh
- District: Srikakulam
- Talukas: Kaviti

Languages
  - Official: Telugu
- Time zone: UTC+5:30 (IST)
- PIN: 532322
- Telephone code: 08947
- Vehicle Registration: AP30 (former); AP39 (from 30 January 2019)
- Lok Sabha constituency: Srikakulam
- Vidhan Sabha constituency: Ichchapuram

Kaviti is a village and mandal headquarters of Kaviti mandal in Srikakulam district of the Indian state of Andhra Pradesh.

It is at a distance of 130 Km from the district headquarters.

== Geography ==
Kaviti is located at 19.0167°N 84.6833°E. It has an average elevation of 41 meters (137 feet).

=== Uddanam ===
The coastal belt at Uddanam is covered with large extent of Coconut, Cashewnut, Jack and other fruit trees, is commonly known as 'Udyanam' or 'Udyanavanam' or 'Uddanam'. The area is commonly visited for its scenery.

== Demographics ==
As of 2001 Indian census, the demographic details of Kaviti mandal is as follows:

- Total Population: 70,945 in 16,777 Households
- Male Population: 33,590 and Female Population: 37,355
- Children Under 6-years of age: 9,996 (Boys - 5,120 and Girls - 4,876)
- Total Literates: 33,781
