= Ichchapuram =

- Town
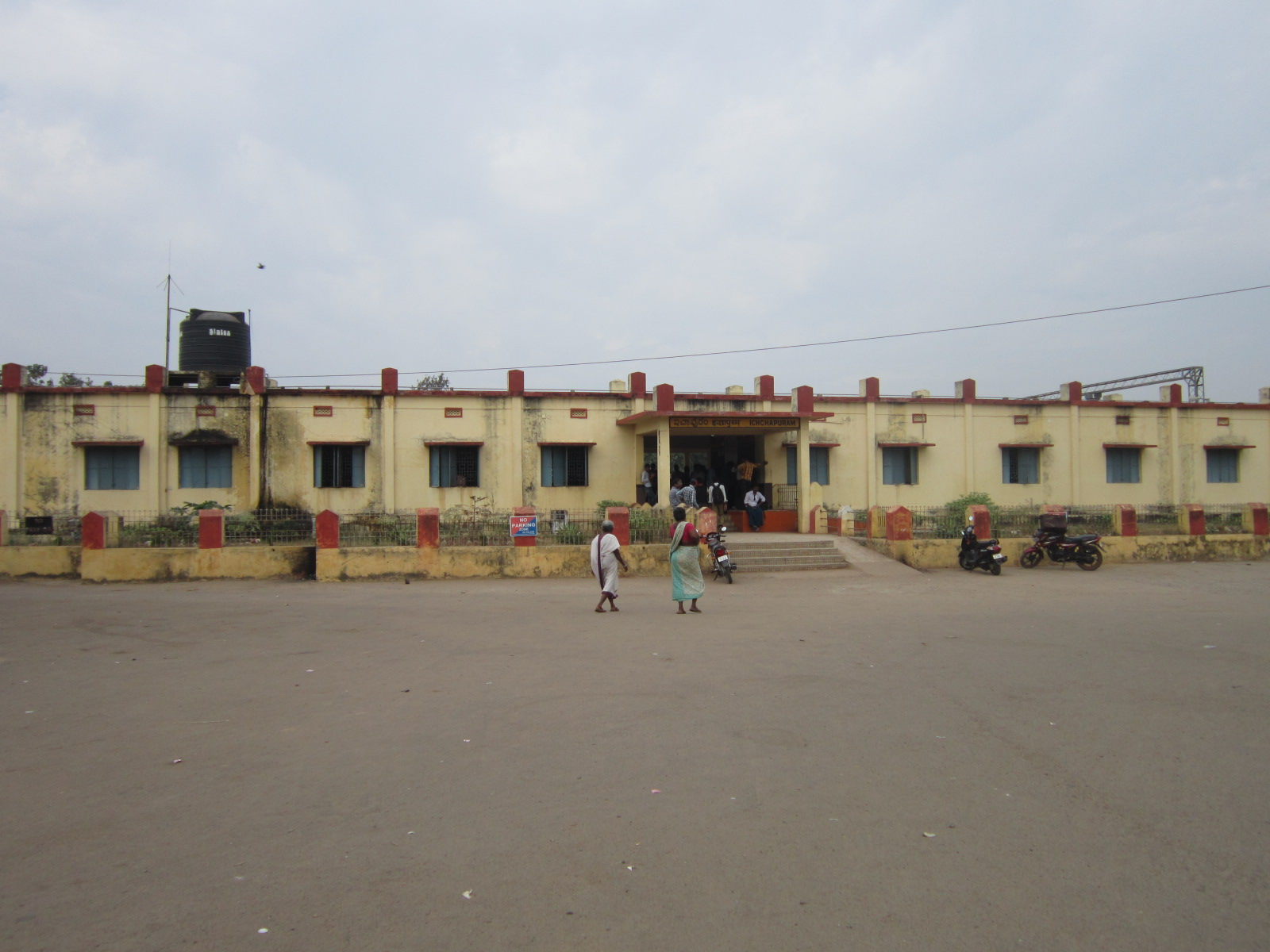
- Ichchapuram railway station

- Location in Andhra Pradesh, India
- Coordinates: 19.12°N 84.7°E
- Country: India
- State: Andhra Pradesh
- District: Srikakulam

Government
  - Type: Municipality
  - Body: Ichapuram Municipality, SUDA
  - Member of Legislative Assembly: Ashok Bendalam

Area
  - Total: 27.28 km^{2} (10.53 sq mi)
- Elevation: 15 m (49 ft)

Population (2011)
  - Total: 40,000
  - Density: 1,500/km^{2} (3,800/sq mi)

Languages
  - Official: Telugu
- Time zone: UTC+5:30 (IST)
- PIN: 532 312
- Telephone code: +91–8947
- Vehicle Registration: AP30 (former); AP39 (from 30 January 2019)
- Lok Sabha constituency: Srikakulam
- Vidhan Sabha constituency: Ichchapuram
- Website: ichapuram.cdma.ap.gov.in

Ichchapuram is a town in the Srikakulam district of the Indian state of Andhra Pradesh. It is located on the border of Odisha and Andhra Pradesh and is nearly 142 km from the district capital, Srikakulam. Ichchapuram municipality is the largest urban local body in the Srikakulam district. It had a population of 36,493 as of 2011.

== History ==
In October-November 2026, Ichchapuram suffered severe flooding from the Bahuda River due to Cyclone Arnab.

== Geography ==
Ichchapuram lies on the border of Andhra Pradesh and Odisha at 19.12°N 84.7°E. It has an average elevation of 7 metres (22 feet). The town sits on the Bahuda river. The overall geographical area of the town is 27 hectares and the nearest town, Palasa, is 50 km away. Sonpur Beach is a 35-minute drive to the east. Ichchapuram's famous Swetchawathi temple is located in the northeast quadrant of the municipality.

== Demographics ==
As of 2011 census, the town had a population of 36,493, with 17,716 males above the age of 6, 18,777 females above the age of 6, and 4,004 children between the ages of 0 and 6. Ichapuram's average literacy rate is 71.12% with 23,105 literate individuals. The two primary languages of the municipality are Telugu and Odia.

== Government and politics ==
Ichchapuram municipality is classified by the Indian government as a 3rd grade municipality. Ichchapuram is an assembly constituency in Andhra Pradesh. Ashok Bendalam is the present MLA.

== Transport ==
National Highway 16, a part of Golden Quadrilateral highway network, bypasses the town. The Ichchapuram railway station is on the Howrah–Chennai main line.

== Climate ==
Climate data for Ichchapuram, Andhra Pradesh
Month	Jan	Feb	Mar	Apr	May	Jun	Jul	Aug	Sep	Oct	Nov	Dec	Year
Mean daily maximum °C (°F)	25.4 (77.7)	26.1 (79.0)	31.4 (88.5)	33.5 (92.3)	34.9 (94.8)	32.5 (90.5)	28.4 (83.1)	28.8 (83.8)	29.2 (84.6)	28.9 (84.0)	26 (79)	25.5 (77.9)	29.2 (84.6)
Mean daily minimum °C (°F)	15.1 (59.2)	16.3 (61.3)	19.9 (67.8)	24.8 (76.6)	26.2 (79.2)	26.4 (79.5)	26.1 (79.0)	25.5 (77.9)	25.4 (77.7)	21.2 (70.2)	17.4 (63.3)	14.3 (57.7)	21.5 (70.8)

== Education ==
There are several private schools in the town, including Vidhya Bharathi English medium school, Swarna Bharathi English medium school, Gnana Bharathi English medium school, and Ravindra Bharathi English medium school.

== See also ==
- List of municipalities in Andhra Pradesh
