= G. D. V. Prasad =

The Reverend G. D. V. Prasad CSI
- Born: Gundugollu Deva Vara Prasad; Andhra Pradesh
- Citizenship: Indian
- Education: B.Sc. (Andhra), 1979, B. D. (Serampore), 1981, M. Th. (Serampore)
- Alma mater: Bishop’s College, Calcutta, United Theological College, Bangalore, University of Aberdeen, Scotland
- Occupations: Ecclesiastical Administrator and Translations Scholar
- Religion: Christianity
- Church: Church of South India (Diocese of Krishna-Godavari)
- Writings: 2011, The Bible Society of India: Partnership in Scripture Translation; 2011, Imaging the Word: A Twenty-First Century Perspective 1811-2011 (with Chiranjivi Nirmal)
- Congregations served: CSI-St. John's Church, Visakhapatnam
- Offices held: Teacher of Old Testament, Bishop’s College, Calcutta (-1991), Director, (Translations), Bible Society of India, Bangalore (1991-2011)
- Title: The Reverend

G. D. V. Prasad is an Old Testament scholar and translator who was the Director of Translations at the Bible Society of India, Bangalore, from 1991 to 2010. Prasad is from the Diocese of Krishna-Godavari of the Church of South India.

== Spiritual studies ==
=== West Bengal ===
After initial graduate studies in sciences at the Andhra University, Prasad discerned his avocation towards priesthood and was sent by N. D. Anandarao Samuel, then Bishop-in-Krishna-Godavari for propadeutic studies to the Bishop’s College, Calcutta where he pursued a graduate degree in divinity along with his companion, G. Dyvasirvadam, also hailing from the Diocese of Krishna-Godavari. Later, the Senate of Serampore College (University) awarded Prasad a degree in B. D. during the Registrarship of D. S. Satyaranjan.

=== Karnataka ===
For postgraduate studies, Prasad enrolled at the United Theological College, Bangalore in 1979 where he specialised in the Old Testament under Theodore N. Swanson and E. C. John, a direct student of Gerhard von Rad and Claus Westermann. Companions of Prasad during his postgraduate studies included M. Devadas and G. Devakadasham. Prasad's study period at the Seminary in Bangalore coincided with the Old Testament scholar Rev. G. Babu Rao's research studies. After two years in Bangalore, Prasad completed his studies in 1981 and was awarded a postgraduate degree, M.Th., by the Senate of Serampore College (University) in its ensuing convocation held in 1982 at the Karnataka Theological College, Mangalore during the Registrarship of the New Testament Scholar, D. S. Satyaranjan.

=== Scotland ===
After a period of ecclesiastical ministry as presbyter and teacher of the Old Testament, Prasad carried out research at the University of Aberdeen, Scotland where some of his companions from India included Siga Arles and others.

== Ecclesiastical contribution ==
Prasad was ordained as a Pastor of the Diocese of Krishna-Godavari of the Church of South India during the bishopric of T. B. D. Prakasa Rao at a joint ordination mass at the CNI-St. Paul's Cathedral, Kolkata in the presence of Dinesh Chandra Gorai, then Bishop - in - Calcutta.

=== Teacher ===
Prasad began his ecclesiastical contribution first as a Teacher of the Old Testament at the Bishop’s College, Calcutta and began teaching along with Timotheas Hembrom who, incidentally, was a study companion of G. Babu Rao, Nitoy Achümi and Basil Rebera.

=== Pastoral ===
After a period of teaching ministry in West Bengal, Prasad was recalled to the Diocese of Krishna-Godavari to take up a pastoral role at the CSI-St. John's Church in Visakhapatnam during the bishopric of T. B. D. Prakasa Rao. Prasad pastored a predominantly Congregational Church that was established by the London Missionary Society.

=== Translations ===
In 1991, after returning from the University of Aberdeen, Prasad joined the Bible Society of India as Director, Translations succeeding John Philipose During Prasad's stint with the Translations Department, he worked closely with the Translation Consultants of the United Bible Societies, Graham Ogden and Basil Rebera.

Following the footsteps of his predecessors, Chrysostom Arangaden, M. P. John and John Philipose, Prasad ensured that translations continued to remain in focus and worked together with his colleague Jonadob Nathaniel, then translations advisor. Many versions and revisions of the Bible were released during Prasad's incumbency as Director, Translations. One among them was the Lambadi version of the New Testament which was released at the STBC-Centenary Baptist Church, Secunderabad in the presence of Rev. G. Babu Rao, then auxiliary secretary of the Bible Society of India Andhra Pradesh Auxiliary on 25 October 1999.

During the bicentenary of the Bible Society of India, Prasad along with Chiranjivi J. Nirmal co-authored Imaging the Word: A Twenty-First Century Perspective.

In 2001 when T. B. D. Prakasa Rao took voluntary retirement from the Diocese of Krishna-Godavari, Prasad chose not to contest the bishopric paving way for the election and subsequent consecration of G. Dyvasirvadam, his companion at the Bishop’s College, Calcutta as the fifth CSI-Bishop-in-Krishna-Godavari Diocese.

Other offices
Preceded by John Philipose, 1984-1991	Director-Translations, Bible Society of India, Bangalore; 1991-2011	Succeeded by D. Jonadob Nathaniel, 2011-
