= Graham Ogden =

Old Testament scholar

The Reverend Doctor Graham Sydney Ogden
- Born: 17 July 1938 (age 88); Sydney, Australia
- Citizenship: Australian
- Education: 1957, B.A. (Sydney, 1961, L.Th. (Moore), 1961, B.D. (London), 1965, M. Litt. (Durham), 1975, Ph.D. (Princeton)
- Alma mater: University of Sydney, Sydney, Moore Theological College, Sydney, University of London, London, University of Durham, Durham, Princeton Theological Seminary, Princeton
- Occupations: Priest, Translator and Old Testament Scholar
- Years active: 1961-present

Ecclesiastical career
- Religion: Christianity
- Church: Anglican
- Ordained: As Deacon in 1962 at Durham Cathedral, Durham, As Priest in 1964 at St. John's College Chapel, Durham
- Writings: see section
- Congregations: England, Australia, Japan, Singapore, United States, Taiwan and Hong Kong
- Offices held: Planning Officer, Department of Main Roads, Sydney 1958, Tutor and Research Fellow, St John's College, Durham 1962-1964, Missionary, Church Missionary Society 1965-1972, Lecturer in Old Testament, Trinity Theological College, Singapore 1968-1972, Lecturer in Old Testament, United Theological College, Sydney 1976-1978, CMS Missionary, Professor of Old Testament and Academic Dean, Taiwan Theological College, Taipei 1978-1985, Translations Consultant, United Bible Societies 1985-2003, Asia-Pacific Regional Translation Co-ordinator, United Bible Societies 1995-1999
- Title: Rev. Dr.

Graham Sydney Ogden is an Old Testament scholar who served as Translations Consultant with the United Bible Societies. Ogden contributed to the scholarly journals through his research and his writings began appearing in The Bible Translator, Journal of Biblical Literature, Journal for the Study of the Old Testament, Vetus Testamentum and other journals.

== United Bible Societies ==
Ogden joined the United Bible Societies in 1985 and oversaw the translations in the Asia-Pacific region. As part of his visits to India, Ogden used visit the Bible Society of India, Bangalore liaising with John Philipose, G. D. V. Prasad and Jonadob Nathaniel, the successive Translations incharges and oversee the translation/revision projects of the Bible Society of India in Bengali, Gujarati, Odiya, and Telugu. Ogden also used to visit the Bible Society of India Andhra Pradesh Auxiliary in Secunderabad liaising with Rev. G. Babu Rao, the Coordinator of the Telugu language Old Testament Common Language Translation project of the Bible Society of India and a former study companion of Basil Rebera at the United Theological College, Bangalore.

As Translation Consultant with the United Bible Societies, Ogden took up translation of the Bible into Troko, Amis, Yami, Bunun, Paiwan, Tayal, and Hakka Chinese. Ogden is a graduate of both Japanese (Tokyo) and Mandarin (Taipei) Language Schools.

During Ogden's stint with the United Bible Societies, he worked closely with Basil Rebera, his colleague and Translations Consultant.

== Writings ==
Ogden has contributed to the study of the Old Testament and acknowledges the influence of senior Old Testament Scholars, Norman Porteous and Bernard Anderson.

=== Commentaries ===
- 1987, A Promise of Hope- a Call to Obedience: A Commentary on the Books of Joel and Malachi

=== Books ===
- 1975, The Tob-Spruch in Qoheleth : its function and significance as a criterion for isolating and identifying aspects of Qoheleth's thought
- 1978, Moses and Cyrus
- 1997, A Handbook on Ecclesiastes
- 1998, A Handbook on Song of Songs
- 2007, Qoheleth
- 2011, Isaiah

=== Articles ===
- 1979, Qoheleth's Use of the 'Nothing is Better'-Form
- 1982, Prophetic oracles against foreign nations and Psalms of communal lament: the relationship of Psalm 137 to Jeremiah 49:7-22 and Obadiah
- 1983, Qoheleth XI 1-6
- 1983, Joel 4 and Prophetic Responses to National Laments
- 1984, The Mathematics of Wisdom: Qoheleth IV 1-12
- 1984, Qoheleth XI 7-XIII 8: Qoheleth's Summons to Enjoyment and Reflection
- 1986, The Interpretation of dor in Ecclesiastes 1:4
- 1988, The Use of Figurative Language in Malachi 2:10-16
- 1996, Jotham's Fable: its structure and function in Judges 9
- 1997, The 'Better'-Probert (tob-Spruch), Rhetorical Criticism, and Qoheleth
- 2003, Literary Allusions in Isaiah: Isaiah 44:28-45:13 Revisited
- 2004, Temporal Idioms in Isaiah 16.14; 21.16; and 23.15
- 2004, Rev. Euan McG. Fry
- 2004, The relationship between Isaiah 33.14b-16 and Psalm 15.1-5
- 2005, Translator training in the UBS Asia-Pacific region
- 2009, Note: An Exegetical Issue in Isaiah 16.14
- 2010, Isaiah 24: A Case of Form over Content?

Academic offices
Preceded by -	Asia-Pacific Regional Translations Coordinator, United Bible Societies; 1995-1999	Succeeded by Daud Soesilo
