= Jonadob Nathaniel =

The Reverend Doctor D. Jonadob Nathaniel CSI
- Born: Devasagayam Jonadob Nathaniel; India
- Citizenship: Indian
- Education: B.Sc. (Madras), B. D. (Serampore), M. Th. (Serampore), Th.D. (SEAGST)
- Alma mater: Madras University, Union Biblical Seminary, Pune (Maharashtra), United Theological College, Bangalore (Karnataka), South East Asia Graduate School of Theology, Manila (Philippines)
- Occupations: Ecclesiastical Administrator and Translations Scholar
- Religion: Christianity
- Church: Church of South India
- Writings: No date, Critical Perspectives: The Anawim and the Tsunamis, 2014, The Feeding of the 5000 – from post colonial perspective
- Offices held: Translations Advisor, Bible Society of India, Bangalore (1990-2011)
- Title: The Reverend Doctor

Devasagayam Jonadob Nathaniel is a New Testament Scholar and the current the Director, Translations at the Bible Society of India, Bangalore.

Jonadob was Translations Advisor at the Bible Society of India and was involved in language translations and revisions of the Bible in many of the Indian languages. As a Translations Scholar, Jonadob Nathaniel has been an advocate of the Paratext utility developed by the United Bible Societies.

In 2014, Jonadob led a Nepali language Bible Translation Workshop at Darjeeling.

== Studies ==
Jonadob pursued graduate studies in sciences from the Madras University and proceeded to the Union Biblical Seminary, Pune where he studied a bachelors course under C. V. Mathew.

For postgraduate studies, Jonadob joined the United Theological College, Bangalore where he specialised in New Testament during 1988–1990 under Professor K. James Carl and M. V. Abraham and undertook a dissertation entitled The background and use of the term "Mysterion" in the Pauline Corpus and was awarded an M. Th. degree by Senate of Serampore College (University) in its annual convocation by then Registrar, D. S. Satyaranjan. During Jonadob's study period in Bangalore, his other companions included B. D. Prasad Rao, H. R. Cabral and Daniel Sadananda. Jonadob also pursued doctoral studies at the South East Asia Graduate School of Theology in Manila.

== Ecclesiastical ministry ==
In 1990, Jonadob became Translations Advisor at the Bible Society of India, Bangalore working together with John Philipose, then Director-Translations followed by the G. D. V. Prasad. As part of the Translations, Jonadob used to review the new and modern translations throughout India and also used to visit the Bible Society of India Andhra Pradesh Auxiliary in Secunderabad together with Graham Ogden, liaising with the Old Testament Scholar, Rev. G. Babu Rao, Coordinator of the Telugu Old Testament Common Language Translation Project of the Bible Society of India.

After nearly two-decades as Translation Adviser, Jonadob Nathaniel was made Director-Translations in 2011 succeeding G. D. V. Prasad and continues to take forward the translation work with a new impetus with an able translation team comprising Premraj Nag and N. Subramani. Moreover, the present General Secretary Mani Chacko hails from the clergy and also happens to be an Old Testament Scholar.

Other offices
Preceded by G. D. V. Prasad, 1991–2011	Director-Translations, Bible Society of India, Bangalore; 2011-Present	Succeeded by Incumbent
