= Basil Rebera =

Old Testament scholar

- Born: Basil Arthur Rebera; 1935; Sri Lanka
- Died: 2021 (aged 85–86)
- Occupation: Translation scholar
- Years active: 1973–2021 (48 years)
- Known for: Worldwide translations of United Bible Societies
- Title: Dr.
- Parent(s): Ms. Felicia and Mr. Allan

Academic background
- Education: B.D. (Serampore) (1971); M.Th. (Serampore) (1974); Ph.D. (Macquarie) (1981)
- Alma mater: United Theological College, Bangalore (India) (1967-1973); Australian National University, Canberra (Australia) (1976); Macquarie University, Sydney (Australia) (1979-1981)
- Thesis: The Book of Ruth: Dialogue and Narrative, the Function and Integration of the Two Modes in an Ancient Hebrew Story (1981)
- Doctoral advisor: Frank Anderson

Academic work
- Discipline: Semiotics
- Sub-discipline: Old Testament Translation
- Institutions: Translation Consultant, United Bible Societies Asia-Pacific Region Region (1976–1988), Director, Translation and Text Division of the Bible Society Australia (1988–1993), Coordinator United Bible Societies Global Translation Services (1993–2000)

Basil A. Rebera (1935–2021) was an Old Testament Scholar and a Translation Consultant with the United Bible Societies focusing on translations of the Bible the world over. As a contributor to scholarly research, Rebera's writings have been reviewed in Journal of Biblical Literature and The Bible Translator.

In 1975, Rebera took part in the second All-India Biblical Meeting held under the aegis of the National Biblical, Catechetical and Liturgical Centre in Bangalore led by Rev. Fr D. S. Amalorpavadass where Rebera presented a report on the Inter-Confessional translations of the Bible Society of India.

== Contribution ==
Rebera is an authority on Ruth and his linguistic analysis has caught the attention of many Translation scholars. Kristin Moen Saxegaard in Character Complexity in the Book of Ruth writes that

Basil A. Rebera raises another theological question in his arguments. Normally in Ruth (Ruth 1:8; 2:12, 19; 3:10; 4:11), it is the "beneficiary that merits the invocation" which is the focus, not the benefactor. When Ruth tells Naomi that it was at Boaz' field, Naomi "immediately invokes a second blessing in Ruth 2:20.". I find Rebera's arguments convincing.

Further, Robert B. Chisholm of the Dallas Theological Seminary in Interpreting the Historical Books: An Exegetical Handbook writes that

Collation analysis can be the key to correct interpretation. A fine example of this is Basil Rebera's study of Naomi's blessing in Ruth 2:20.

Joy Sisley of the Staffordshire University in her work, Power and Interpretive Authority in Multimedia Translation writes,

Basil Rebera argues that any discussion of faithfulness should recognize that "Christians and people of other faiths alike recognize only a written text as the Christian Scriptural source of revelation and authority". Rebera links the issue of faithfulness to the original Word with a problem of authenticity. He discusses the problem of fidelity in fairly narrow terms by pointing to a distinction between the specific nature of images and the generic nature of language. He applies the same criteria of equivalence as the linguistic model by assuming that the meaning of the image is intentional in that it stands for the object it represents in a one-to-one relationship.

== Studies ==
=== Graduate ===
Rebera pursued graduate studies in theology from 1967 to 1971 at the United Theological College, Bangalore, the only autonomous College under the nation's first University, the Senate of Serampore College (University) where he obtained a Bachelor of Divinity (B. D.) during the Principalship of Joshua Russell Chandran. Incidentally, when the Old Testament Scholar and an alma mater of the college, Victor Premasagar happened to proceed to St. Andrew's University for research studies, he happened to stop over at the college and taught introductory Biblical Hebrew to the graduate students. As a student of Victor Premasagar, Rebera took interest in learning the ancient Biblical languages and went on to enroll for postgraduate studies in Biblical Studies specializing in Old Testament.

During his collegiate studies, Rebera took an active part in literary pursuits and was made Assistant Editor of the UTC College Magazine during 1969–1970.

=== Post-graduate ===
Soon after Rebera completed his graduate studies, the Bible Society of India led by the clergy consisting of A. E. Inbanathan and C. Arangaden, then General Secretary and Associate General Secretary (Translations) respectively, chose Rebera to pursue post-graduate studies in Biblical Studies so that he would be an asset to the Bible Society of India. Rebera then continued his studies at the Seminary by enrolling into Master of Theology, specializing in Old Testament under E. C. John from 1971 to 1973 working out a dissertation entitled The meaning of mispat and sedeq/sedaqah in the pre-exilic prophetic literature and their translation in the Sinhalese Bible. Rebera was part the pioneer group of postgraduate students who specialised in Old Testament comprising A. P. Chacko, G. Babu Rao, Nitoy Achümi, S. J. Theodore and Timotheas Hembrom. The university awarded graduate and postgraduate degrees in the ensuing convocations during the Registrarship of C. Devasahayam.

==== Study Companions ====
Rebera and his erstwhile companions at the United Theological College, Bangalore comprising G. Babu Rao, S. J. Theodore, N. K. Achumi, A. P. Chacko, and Timotheas Hembrom were notable for their contribution to the Bible Society in translation and revision of the scriptures into other languages. While Timotheas Hembrom was involved in Santali language translation, N. K. Achumi was involved in translation/revision of the Bible in Naga language. Similarly, G. Babu Rao joined the Bible Society of India in 1973 as Translator of the Telugu Old Testament and a decade later, in 1984, became Coordinator of the Telugu Old Testament Common Language Translation (Telugu OT-CL) Project of the Bible Society of India which also took along S. J. Theodore on the panel of the Telugu OT-CL Project Team.

E. C. John, the Professor of Rebera and his study companions was instrumental in infusing scholarly enthusiasm among his students. Known for his scholarship and administration, E. C. John was also involved in Malayalam translation of the Bible.

=== Research ===
For research studies, Rebera studied at the Macquarie University and at the Australian National University and was awarded a doctorate by the Macquarie University in 1981 in Biblical Studies based on his dissertation entitled, The Book of Ruth: Dialogue and Narrative, the Function and Integration of the Two Modes in an Ancient Hebrew Story.

== Translation career ==
The confidence reposed in Rebera by the clergy consisting of the rural Pastor, A. E. Inbanathan and C. Arangaden remained for posterity as Rebera metamorphosed himself into a Translation scholar.

=== Bible Society of India ===
Rebera began his career as a Translator with the Bible Society of India right from 1973 onwards.

=== United Bible Societies ===
In 1974, Rebera was appointed Translation Consultant by the United Bible Societies for the Asia-Pacific Region Region and was based in India, Thailand and Singapore, a position which he held until 1988 till he moved to the Bible Society Australia.

In his second stint starting in 1993 at the United Bible Societies, Rebera became Coordinator for the Global Translation Services at the United Bible Societies and was based in New York at the American Bible Society. Rebera was appointed in 1993–1994 and oversaw translations of the Bible into many languages and also the revision of the existing versions. Rebera worked closely with the Asia-Pacific Regional Translations Coordinator, Graham S. Ogden.

=== Bible Society Australia ===
In 1988, Rebera took up the position of Director, Translation and Text Division of the Bible Society Australia. After a 6-year stint with the Bible Society Australia, Rebera again moved to the United Bible Societies in 1993.

== Writings ==
- 1973, The meaning of mispat and sedeq/sedaqah in the pre-exilic prophetic literature and their translation in the Sinhalese Bible,
- 1975, The Bible Society of India and Inter-Confessional Translations,
- 1982, Identifying participants in Old Testament dialogue,
- 1983, Book titles (2): the prophetic books,
- 1985, Yahweh or Boaz: Ruth 2:20 reconsidered,
- 1987, Translating Ruth 3:16,
- 1989, He got up’--or did he: (1 Samuel 20:25)
- 1987, Lexical cohesion in Ruth : a sample
- 1994, Current Trends in Scripture Translation
- 2004, Rev. Euan McG. Fry,
