= Tongshun Street Church =

Protestant church in China

Tongshun Street Church, or Tongshunjie Church (simplified Chinese: 通顺街教堂; traditional Chinese: 通順街教堂; pinyin: Tōngshùn Jiē Jiàotáng; lit. 'smooth street church'), full name Tongshun Street Christian Church, is the oldest Protestant church still operating in Hohhot, the capital of Inner Mongolia, China. Its history can be traced back to 1886. After the mid-1950s, Tongshun Street Church used to be the joint gathering place for all the Christian denominations in the city for quite a few years. Now, the church is the intern church of the Inner Mongolia Bible School and the Bible distribution point of the United Bible Societies in Hohhot.

== History ==
In 1886, the China Inland Mission established a Protestant church on Tongshun Street in Kweisui City (today's Hohhot), with 7 pastors (Swedish), 289 believers, 168 rooms, 2 national schools (one for boys and one for girls), and 1 high school for boys.

From 1923 to 1925, with the help of donations from believers, Swedish pastor Mai purchased a grain store compound on Tongshun Street North Road, built an auditorium there, and established Guisui Peizhen National School in the backyard of the church. A medical office was established where Swedish doctors treated citizens and trained local doctors. The church had a tall bell tower, and the bell could be heard within a radius of three or four miles.

In the late 1950s, the Three-Self Patriotic Movement of "self-government, self-support, and self-preach" emerged in Christian circles across the country. And all the Christian denominations in Hohhot started to hold joint worship services at the Tongshun Street Church.

In 1966, when the Cultural Revolution began, the church was forced to stop gathering and the buildings were converted into a grain station. It was not until around 1980 after the end of the Cultural Revolution that these properties were returned to the church.

In 1987, the church resumed religious services after some simple repairs. At first, services drew only a few hundred participants.

From October 1995 to October 1996, a general renovation was carried out. When completed, the church had a building area of 1,010 square meters and could accommodate 1,500 people worshiping at the same time.

In 2010, the west building of the courtyard was renovated and some offices were added. A new Christian Council residential dormitory was built on the north side.

From September to October 2015, the church was renovated again and facilities such as tables and chairs were added. The members of the church also increased to about 3,000. In the same year, Inner Mongolia Bible School moved into the newly built teaching building in the church yard.

== Ministry ==
In addition to Sunday worship, the church also carries out many other ministries such as evangelism and social care. For example, donation to the Red Cross to fight against COVID-19 and care for empty nesters.

Since 1997, Tongshun Street Church has been the Bible distribution point of the United Bible Societies in Hohhot.

== Architecture ==
The Tongshun Street Church, which was built between 1923 and 1925 and renovated in 1995, has a building area of 1,010 square meters. The main hall is divided into upper and lower floors and can accommodate 1,500 people gathering at the same time. In addition to the main hall, there is also a front hall and a backyard. The front hall is for preaching, and the backyard contains residences, offices and warehouses for pastors and other staff. On the high bell tower hangs a large iron bell with a particularly loud sound. When the bell is struck, it can be heard within a radius of three to five miles.

== Bible school ==
The Inner Mongolia Christian Bible School was founded in 1987, affiliated to the Inner Mongolia Christian Council. It was initially a Christian volunteer class. In 2007, it was renamed "Inner Mongolia Christian Bible School". In 2015, the school moved to the newly built teaching building on the grounds of Tongshun Street Church. At the same time, the church was designated as the school's practice church. There is a three-year college class (Bible and Sacred Music majors), and students come from all over the Region of Inner Mongolia. As of 2022, the cumulative number of graduates of the Bible school has exceeded 1,200.
