= Park Rankin =

The Reverend W. Park Rankin
- Born: England
- Citizenship: British
- Occupation: Pastor
- Religion: Christianity
- Church: Church of South India
- Congregations served: Presbyter, St. Andrew's Church, Bangalore (1960-1961)
- Offices held: Auxiliary Secretary, Bible Society of India Bombay Auxiliary, Mumbai (1953-1959), General Secretary, Bible Society of India, Bangalore (1959-1960), Interim Secretary, Bible Society of Ethiopia, Addis Ababa (1965), Director, Emperor's School for the Blind, Addis Ababa (1971)
- Title: The Reverend

W. Park Rankin was the General Secretary of the Bible Society of India, Bangalore and held office during 1959-1960.

== Ecclesiastical ministry ==
=== Mumbai (India) ===
Earlier, Rankin was the Auxiliary Secretary of the Bombay Auxiliary during 1953-1959 and was involved in the translation of the Bible into Marathi language and Gujarati language. When Rankin's services were required at the Central Office of the Bible Society of India, Rankin left from Mumbai to Bangalore in 1959 making J. B. Satyavrata to hold the post of Auxiliary Secretary of the Bible Society of India Bombay Auxiliary. Although Rankin was supposed to return to Mumbai after a year, his return got delayed due to which Satyavrata was appointed as full-time Auxiliary Secretary of the Bombay Auxiliary.

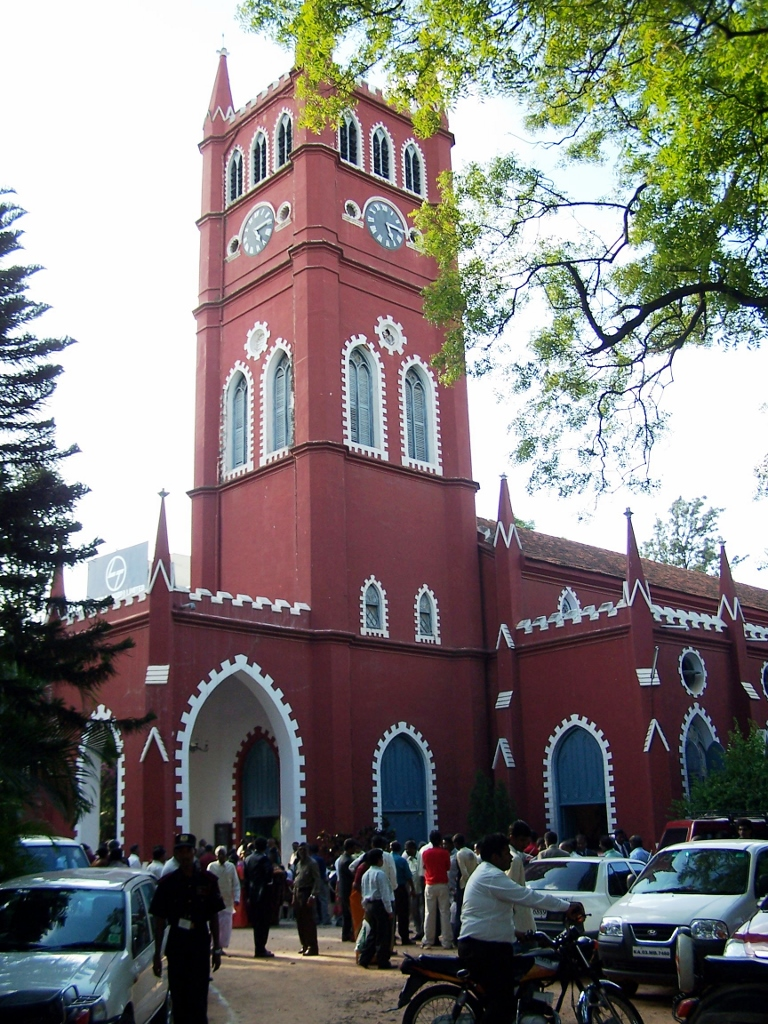
St. Andrew's Church, Bangalore where Rankin and his colleague C. Arangaden served as Presbyters during 1960/1961.

=== Bangalore (India) ===
Rankin was General Secretary of the Bible Society of India for a year during 1959-1960 till a successor was selected and appointed. When the Bible Society of India Trust Association chose the rural Pastor, A. E. Inbanathan as the next General Secretary, Rankin continued to be in Bangalore and served as Deputy General Secretary of the Bible Society of India to help the new General Secretary get acquainted with the knowledge required to take forward the work of the Bible Society of India. It was during Rankin's incumbency that the foundation for the Translations Department was laid resulting in the appointment of Chrysostom Arangaden as Associate General Secretary (Translations).

During Rankin's period of stay in Bangalore, he became full-time Presbyter of the St. Andrew's Church of the Church of South India where he served during 1960-1961. Chrysostom Arangaden, the newly appointed Associate General Secretary (Translations), Bible Society of India also served as Associate Presbyter at the St. Andrew's Church during 1960 along with his colleague Rankin.

=== Addis Ababa (Ethiopia) ===
Rankin later left for Ethiopia where he was the Bible Society in Ethiopia and later served the visually challenged at a home in Addis Ababa.

Other offices
Preceded by	Auxiliary Secretary, Bible Society of India Bombay Auxiliary, Mumbai; 1953-1959	Succeeded by J. B. Satyavrata; 1960-
Preceded by Marjorie Harrison, 1958-1959	General Secretary, Bible Society of India, Bangalore; 1959-1960	Succeeded by A. E. Inbanathan; 1960-1981
Religious titles
Preceded by P. J. Child/Henry Sedlo, 1959	Presbyter, St. Andrew's Church, Bangalore; 1960-1961	Succeeded by David Mackie; 1961-1963
