= St. Andrew's Church, Bengaluru =

St. Andrew's Church
- Saint Andrew's Church
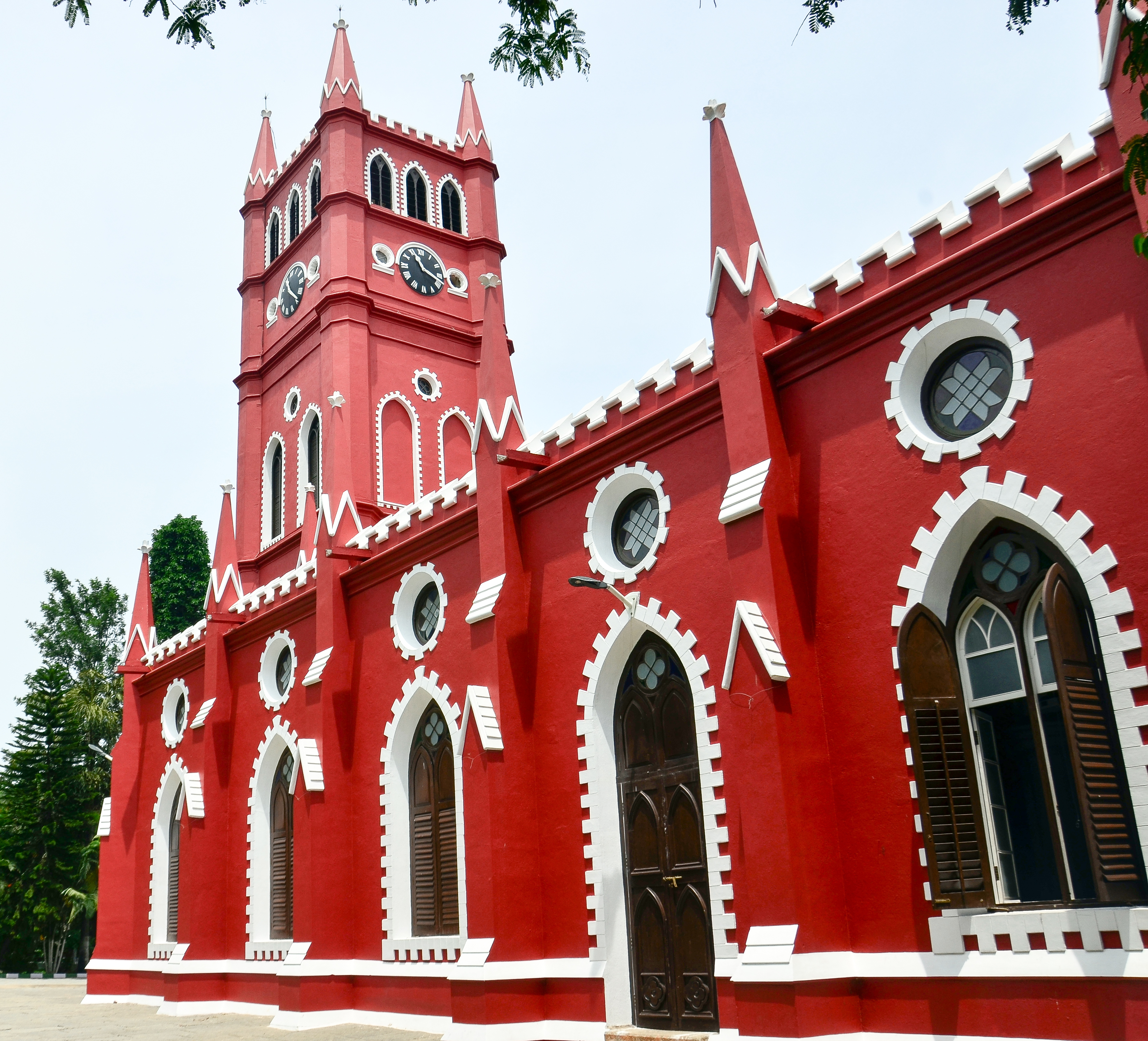
- St. Andrew's Church
- 12°58′45″N 77°36′15″E
- Location: Bangalore
- Country: India
- Denomination: Church of South India
- Tradition: Anglican
- Website: http://standrewschurch.org.in/

History
- Former name: St. Andrew's Kirk
- Consecrated: 1866

Architecture
- Style: Orthodoxical Presbyterian Scottish
- Years built: 1864-1866
- Groundbreaking: 1864
- Completed: 1866
- Construction cost: £ 4,500 (INR 45000)

Administration
- Diocese: Karnataka Central Diocese

Clergy
- Bishop: Rt. Rev. Dr. Prasana Kumar Samuel

St. Andrew's Church , consecrated in 1866, is a Presbyterian church, located on Cubbon Road, Bangalore. Initially knows as St. Andrews's Kirk, it was a Church of Scotland church till 1959 when it became part of the Karnataka Central Diocese of the Church of South India. The church is named after Saint Andrew, the patron saint of Scotland. St Andrew's Church celebrated its 150 years anniversary on 20 November 2014.

The church was consecrated in memory of Mary Elizabeth McGoun (died 1867), wife of Col. Thomas McGoun of the 6th Madras Native Infantry (died 19 April 1868 at Marseille on the way back to Scotland, has a memorial stone at the St. Andrew's Kirk, Madras), it was once known as the martyr's church. The monument to the memory of Mary Elizabeth is located at the end of the church altar.

== History ==
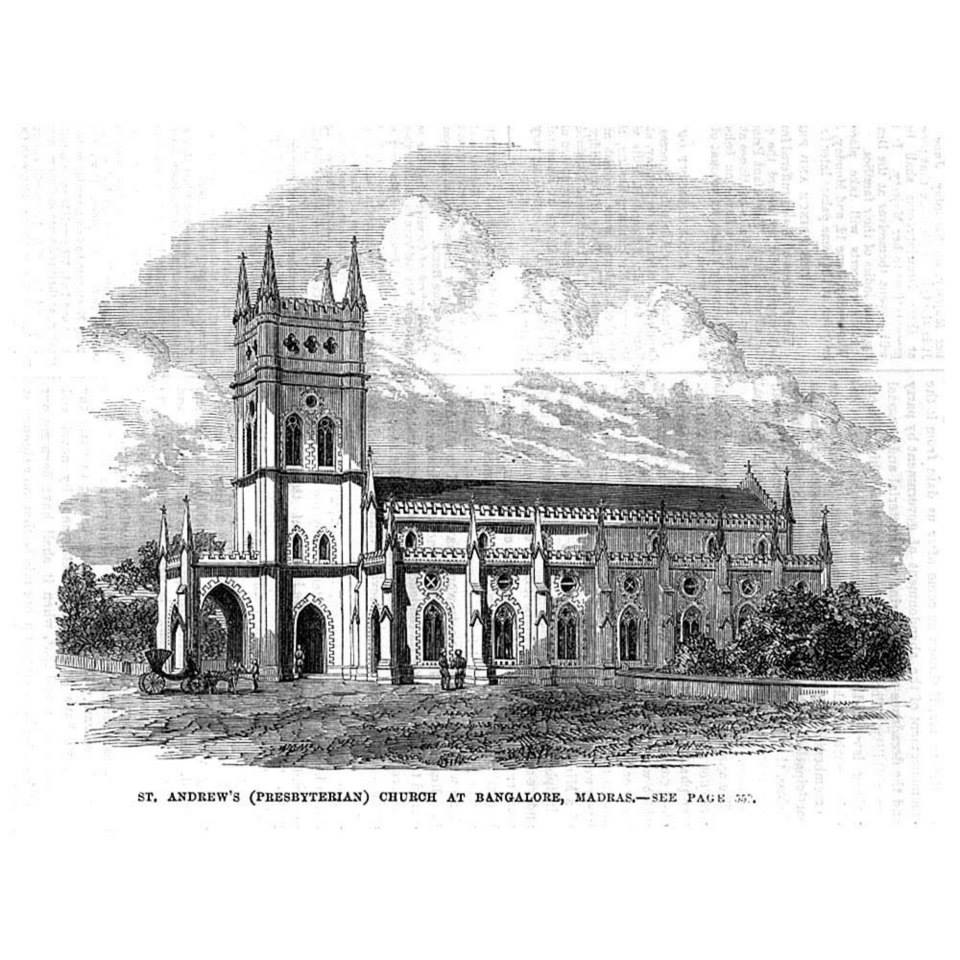
St. Andrew's (Presbyterian) Church at Bangalore, Madras Presidency - Illustrated London News (1866)

The foundation stone for the kirk was laid by Lady Grant, (wife of Lieutenant-General Sir. Hope Grant, the then Quartermaster-General of Her Majesty's Forces in the British Madras Presidency), on 22 November 1864. The church was completed and opened for service on 18 November 1866. The cost of constriction (including the land) was Sterling Pounds 4,500 (INR 45,000), the cost covered by private subscriptions and government grant. The sermon of church dedication was given by Rev. Stewart Wright, Church of Scotland chaplain in the Madras Presidency. Rev. Wright was also the presbyter in charge of the new St. Andrew's Kirk. The Illustrated London News reported the inauguration in 1866, with credits given to R C Dobbs, Executive Engineer of Mysore and Major Sankey, chief Engineer of Mysore

When the St. Mark's Cathedral was damaged by fire on 17 February 1923, St. Andrew's provided its church for the St. Mark's congregation to worship, till St. Mark's was repaired and reopened in 1927. The early congregation consisted of Scottish officers and men of the British Madras Army, and civilians of Scottish origin. Native Indians were also allowed to occupy the back pews.

As a result of the declining Scottish members, in order to attract more people to the church, Kannada services were started in 1965.

== Architecture ==
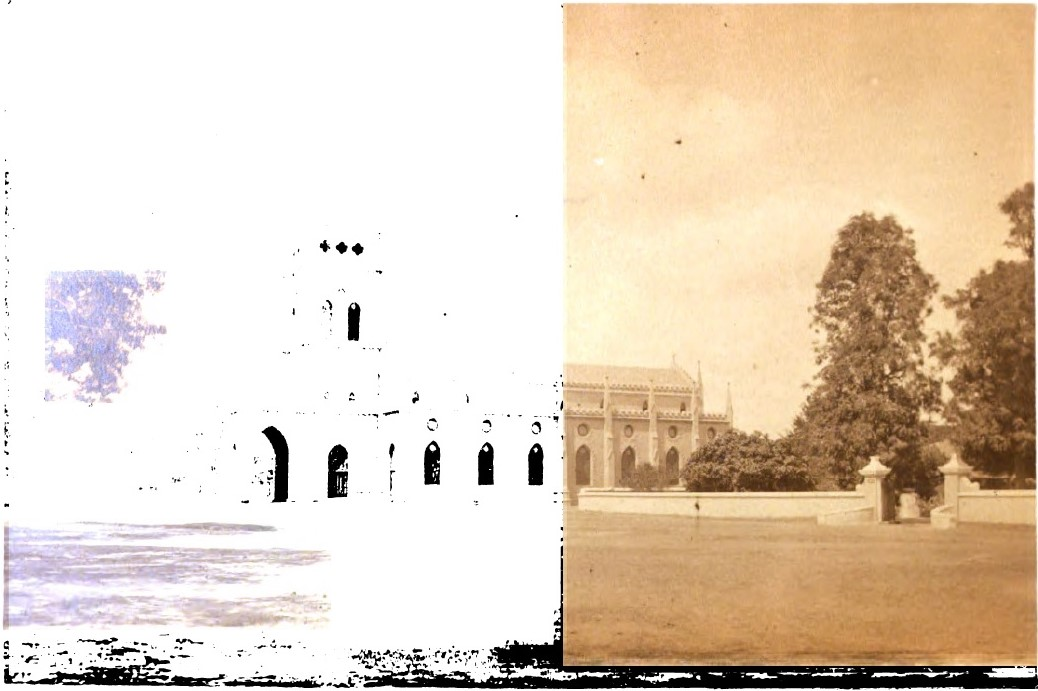
St. Andrew's Kirk, Bangalore (1867)

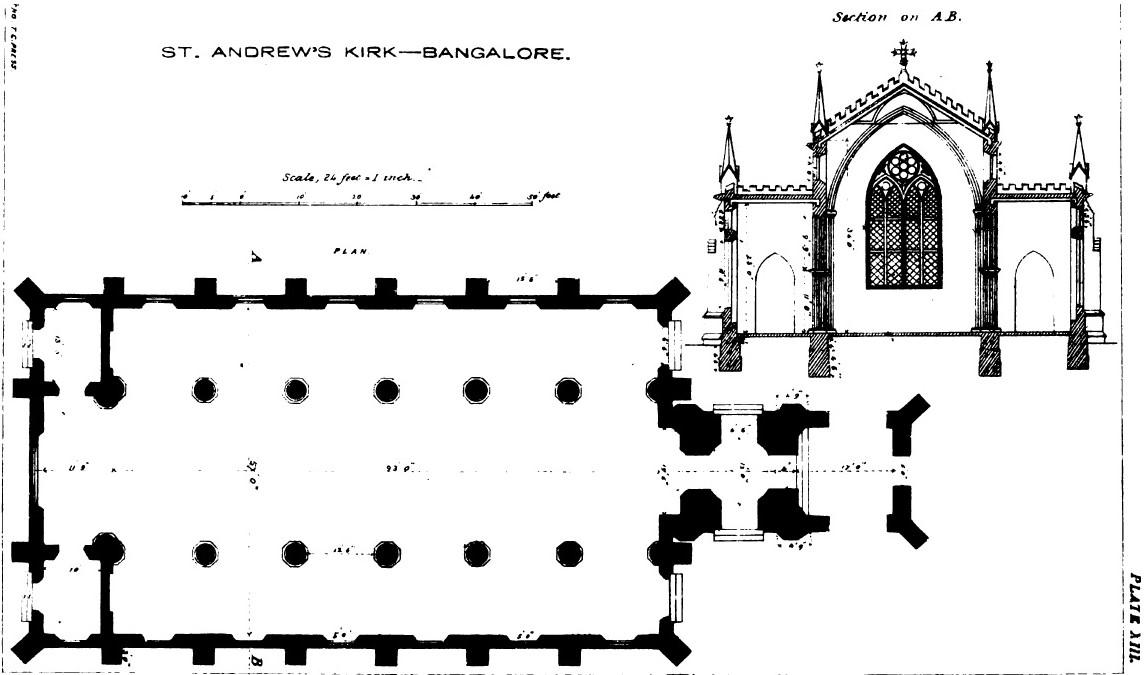
Plan of the St. Andrew's Kirk, Bangalore (1867)

The church building has the Gothic structure, with a height of 43 ft., length of 105 ft., and width of 57 ft. Stained glass covers all the windows and the large gable. The pulpit is made of teak wood, and is richly carved, in sync with the church architecture.

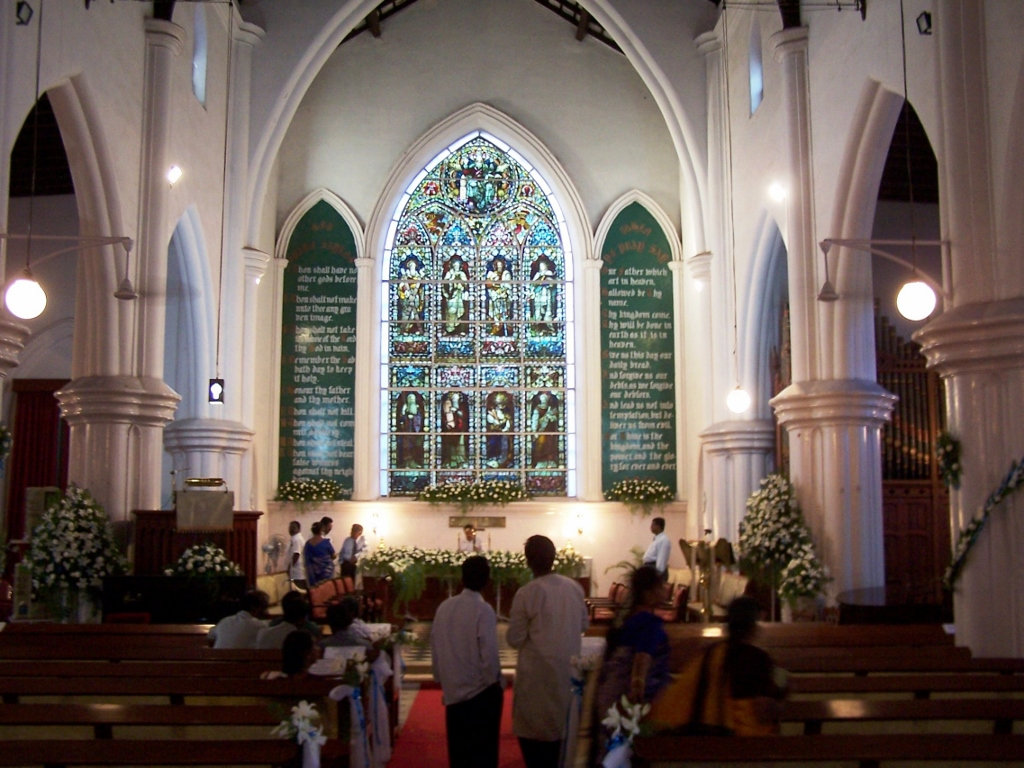
Inside View, St. Andrew's Church, Bangalore (2004)

The brick coloured, pure gothic structure was designed by R C Dobbs and Major Sankey. St Andrew's Kirk was the second church to be designed by Richard Hieram Sankey, (an Irishman from County Tipperary), after the Anglican Cathedral of All Saints at Nagpur. Architecturally, St. Andrew's Church has many similarities with the main block of the Central College, Bangalore, with its Gothic style, characterised by steeping roof of Mangalore tiles, a row of decorative ridge-tiles on the top, turreted parapets and gables, iron crested towers, intricately done plaster motifs, railings of cast iron, and pilasters and pavilions rising from the wing.

Sankey published as description of St. Andrew's Kirk at Bangalore in the journal, Professional Papers on Indian Engineering. Volume 4, published by the Thomason Civil Engineering College, Roorkee. He describes the Kirk to have commenced divine services in November 1864. The church has a length of 93 ft., width of 57 ft. and consisted of a nave covered by a slated pent roof, and aisles on the sides with Bengal terrace roofing. The church was built to accommodate 500 people. The tower was originally intended to be a steeple has a height of 90 ft., nave to the wall plates under the roof trusses was 34 ft., and the side aisles were 23 ft. Brickwork, plastering and chunam (lime) was used in the construction. Ample ventilation and light was made possible by including clerestory windows of the nave, and main and circular windows on the side aisles. There was no transept to break the voice and the acoustics were excellent. The cost of construction was BINR 40,000, with this cost including the furniture and fittings. Half of this cost was raised by public subscription, and the other half met by the Government of Madras. Excluding the furniture and fittings, the cost of construction was BINR 5 per ft2.

== Stained glass ==
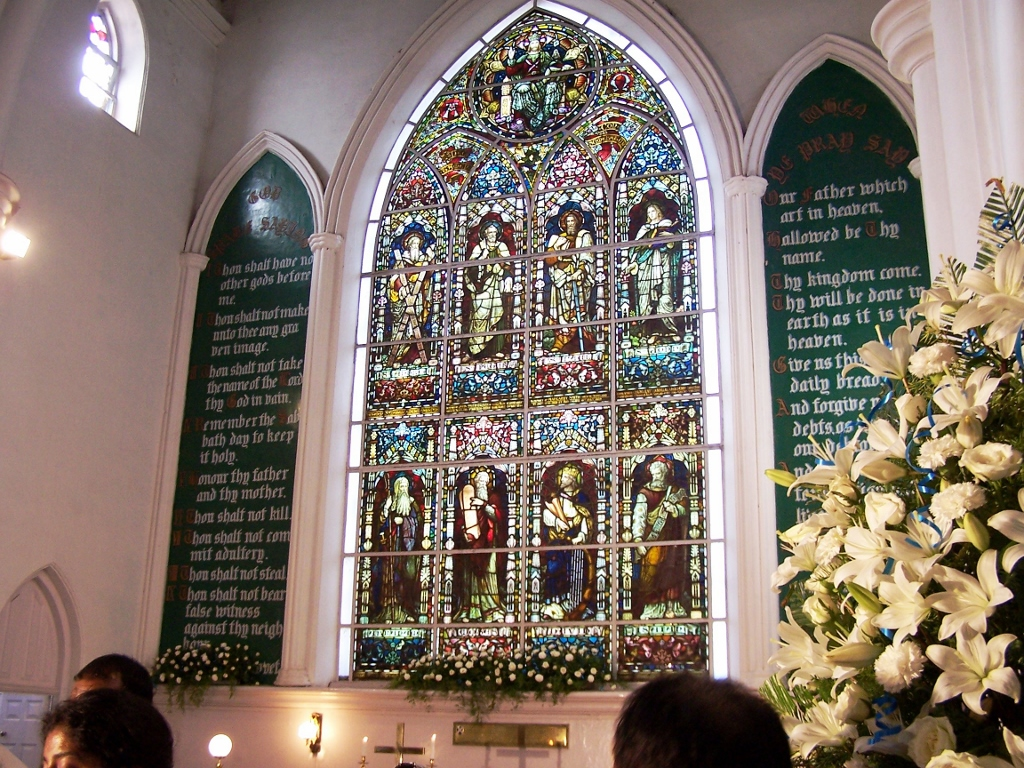
Stained Glass, St. Andrew's

There is a 25 ft. stained glass above the altar, fusing 15 panels into one, created by Scottish artist Alex Ballantine and his assistant Gardiner, in order to commemorate the diamond jubilee of the reign of Queen Victoria in 1897. At the base, the Old Testament characters of Abraham, Moses, King David and Prophet Isaiah are painted. The top the apostles of Christ - St. Andrew, St Peter, St Paul and St John are painted. Above this, there is the burning bush which is the symbol of the Church of kirk, alpha symbol on the right and omega symbol on the right (signifying beginning and the end). On the very top is painted Jesus Christ.

In the late 1970s, the stained glass started sagging backwards, and had to be supported by iron beams from behind.

== Scottish heritage ==
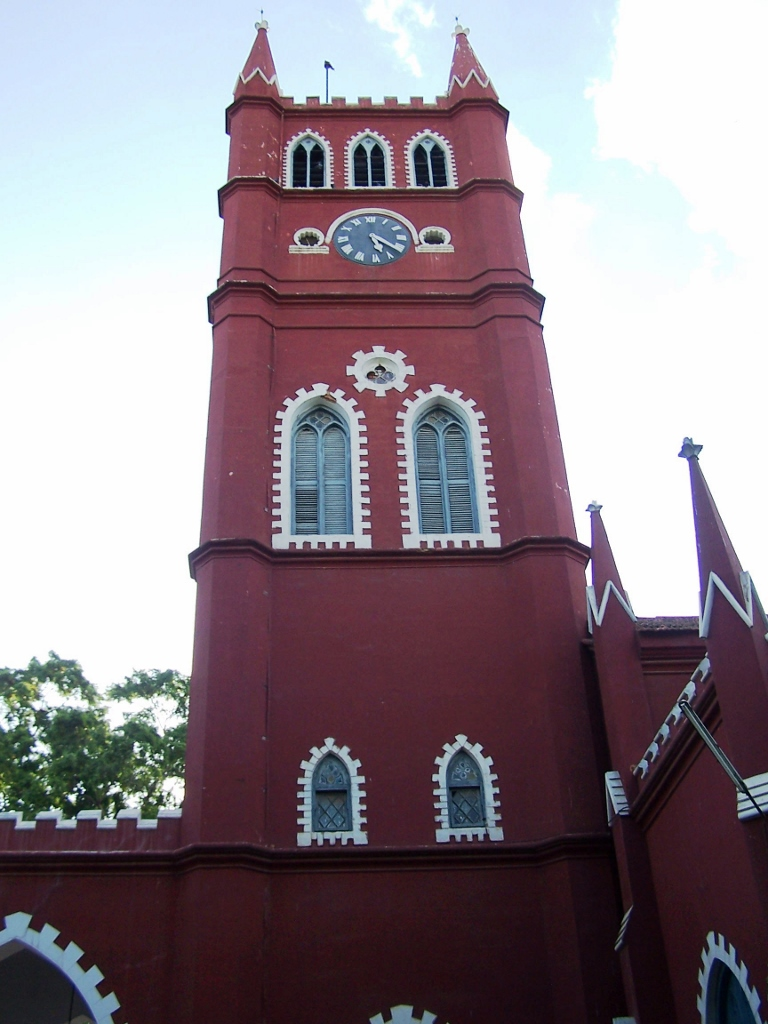
Clock Tower, St. Andrew's

St. Andrews's known as the St. Andrew's Kirk followed Scottish customs, such as western music, classical Scottish square dancing, Burns’ night, celebrating St. Andrew's day, etc. St. Andrew's Church Bangalore, along with 3 other St. Andrew's Churches in India were being governed by the Colonial and Continental Committee of the Church of Scotland. After Indian independence in 1947, the number of Scottish families living in the city declined. Eventually, in September 1959, the church was transferred to the Church of South India, when Rev. P J Child was the last Scottish minister of the congregation.

== Bell Tower ==
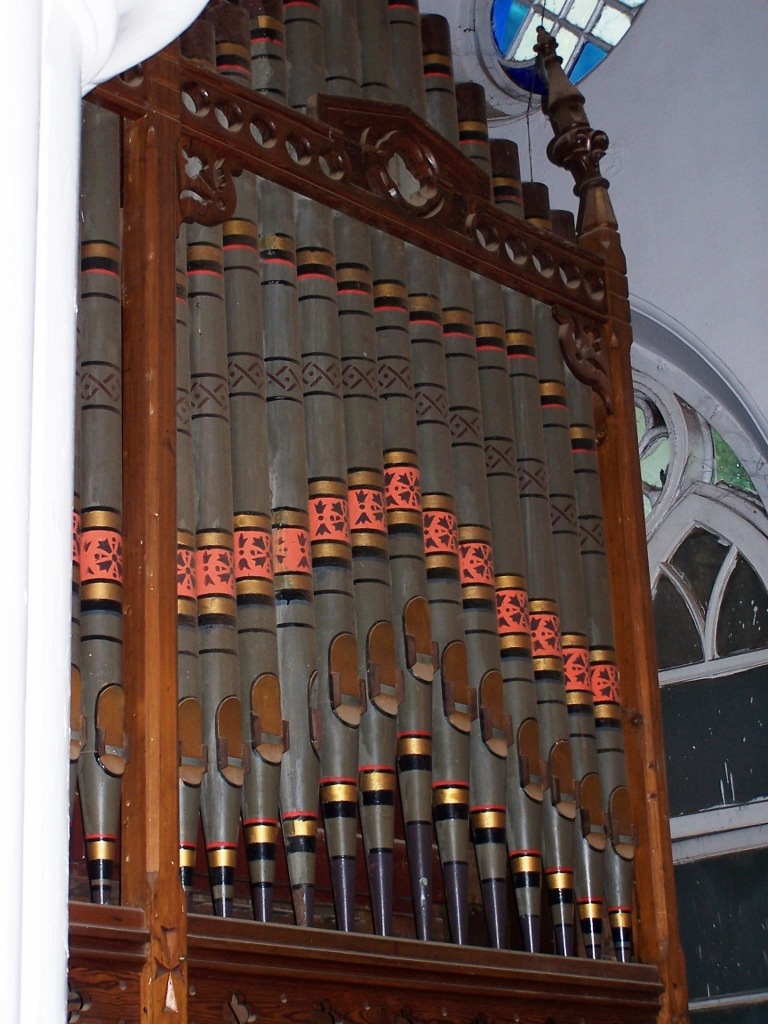
Pipe Organ, St. Andrew's (2004)

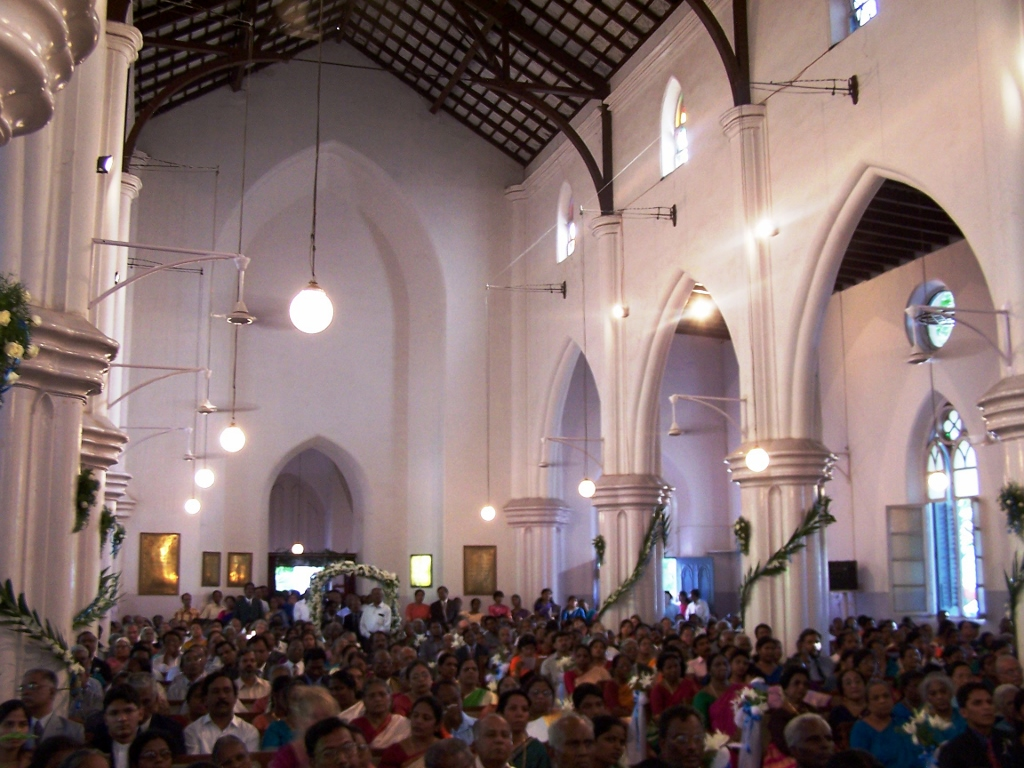
Interiors of St. Andrew's

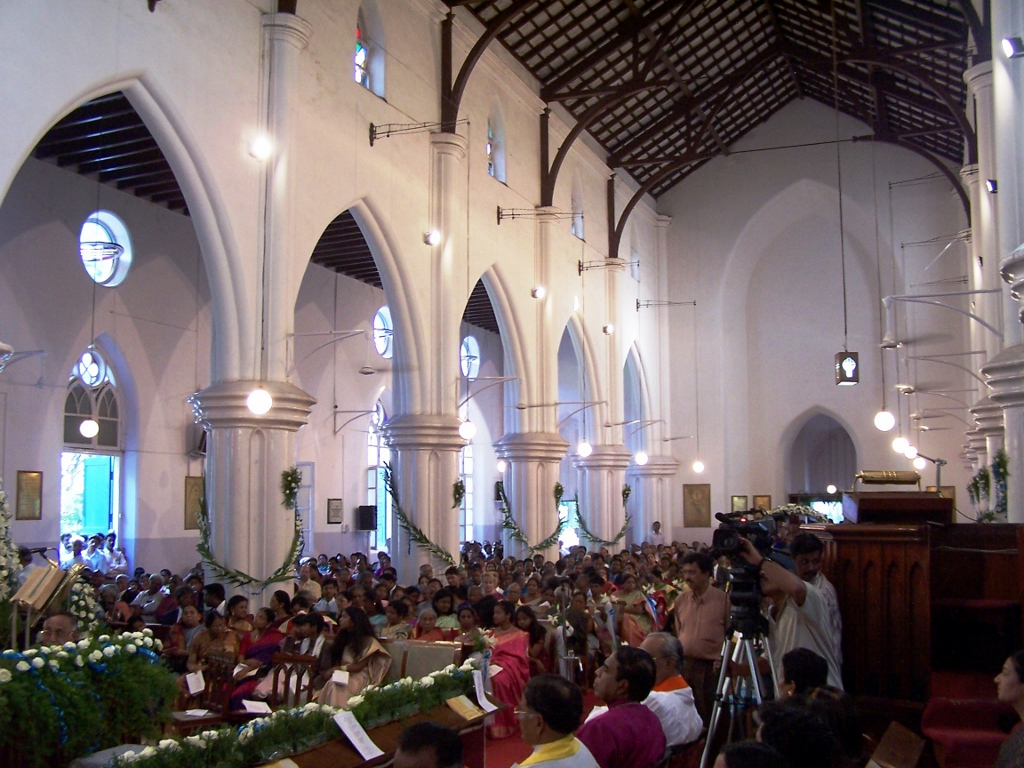
Interiors of St. Andrew's

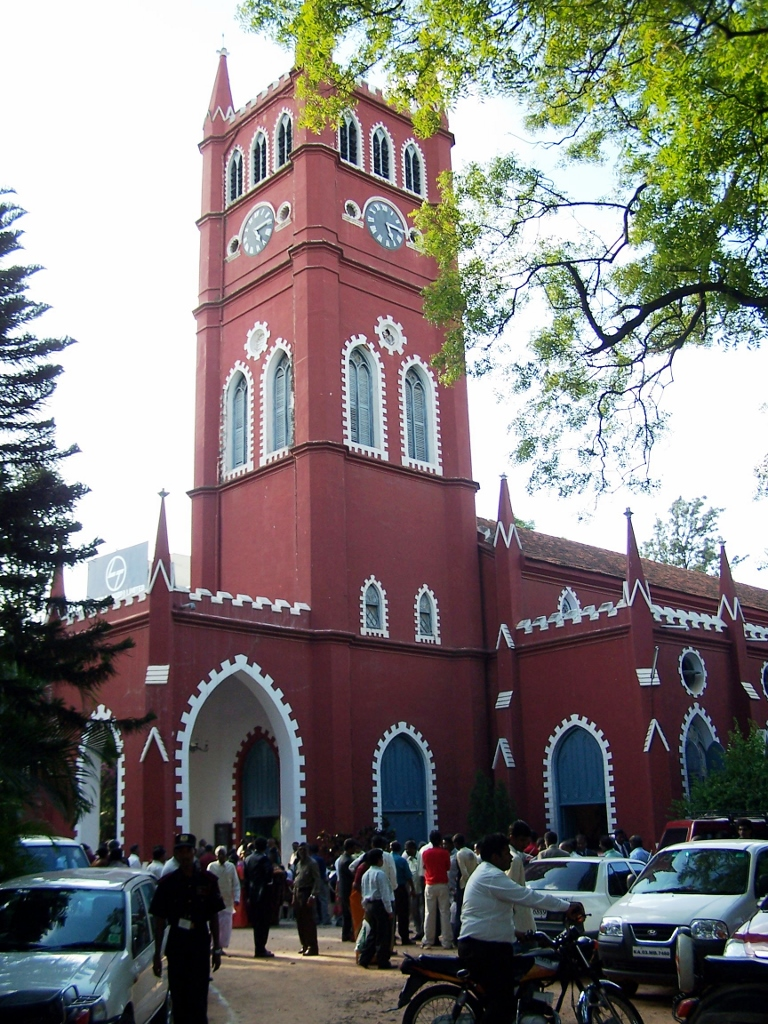
Clock Tower, St. Andrew's (2004)

In 2005, the clock tower of St. Andrew's developed a tilt after heavy rains. The Bishop of Bangalore approached the Bishop of Madras, who sent well known architect Joseph Durairaj to study the damage. Other structural engineers had deemed the clock tower to be unsafe and suggested it be brought down. However Durairaj suggested that the tower was safe and could be restored structurally. The bell tower and the portico had been damaged by wear and tear, and exposure to rains, with the foundation sinking and the tower developing an incline. The Bishop constituted a Church Renovation Implementation Committee, taking advice from the professors of Structural Engineering from the Indian Institute of Science. Restoration work was undertaken, and the completed just in time for the church to celebrate its 142 years on 26 November 2006.

== Pipe organ ==
The old pipe organ was installed in St. Andrew's on 3 May 1881, built by Peter Conacher and Co., Huddersfield, England. After 126 years of service, the organ showed signs of wear and tear. The task of restoration of the pipe organ was done by M/s Middle Organ Company, UK, who restored the organ in record time and also added some more features to the organ. In order to commemorate the restoration, on 4 January 2009, eminent organist and music laureate Prof. Dr. Richard Marlow, Director of Music, Trinity College, UK was invited to perform and organ recital, during the re-dedication of the church organ ceremony. Joseph Thomas Williams, father of Indian composer Ashley William Joseph, was the chief pipe organist.

== St. Andrew's schools ==
=== St. Andrew's High School ===
There existed a St. Andrew's High School, as per the Report on Public Instruction in Mysore, for the Year 1877–78, and other records. In November 1877, the St. Andrew's High School had 20 students in both senior and junior Matriculation Classes(p. 61), with 12 in High School(p. 130) and 4 boarders(p. 179). being managed by the Church of Scotland. Further, records of the Madras Government indicate that in 1871, 1 student of the St. Andrew's High School, Bangalore, passed the Madras Matriculation Exam with a second class. Reports of the Mysore Government dated 1868 also mention the St. Andrew's School, Bangalore. There is no information on when the school was closed or renamed.

=== St. Andrew's Girls' School ===
The St. Andrew's Girls' School was started in January 1878, and was managed by Miss. Millard. The reason for opening this school was the closing of the Wesleyan English Girls' School being closed as a result of the building being converted to an orphanage for girls affected by the great famine (p. 107). There is no information on when the St. Andrew's Girls' School was closed or renamed.

=== St. Andrew's Free School ===
In 1897, a primary school called the St. Andrew's Free School, was started at Thimmiah Road, Bangalore Cantonment. The school was meant for the poorer sections of society and when it started, there were 50 children from poor families, who received free education, uniform and mid-day meal. However, the school had to be closed due to poor response.

According to the records of the Mysore Residency (1880-1947), in 1928, land was acquired for the extension of the St. Andrew's Free School (p. 125), metal work training was started at the school in 1930 (p. 135), the school building was extended in 1931 (p. 137), the school inspected in 1940 (p. 236). In 1944, the building of the St. Andrew's Free School was leased out to the Municipal Commission of the Bangalore Civil and Military Station (p. 298)

The school changed hands to the Corporation in 1944, and was renamed as the Government Urdu Higher Primary School (date unsure). It still stands at Black Palli, Shivaji Nagar. The plaque which reads St Andrews Free School, January 1897 still exists, and so do the buildings and school campus. According to the school head mistress Haneefunissa (who was a student of the school at around 1962), the school once had about 800 students, which has now dropped down to 60. Getting the children to school is a major effort, with ayahs being sent to round them up and bring them to school.

No information is available on when the lease lapses and when the property will revert to the St. Andrew's Church.

=== St. Andrew's Primary School, Siddapura ===
In 1977, the church, re-established the St. Andrews's Primary School at the Siddapura Slum, for the benefit of under-privileged children. The children from poor families are given free uniforms, and free education.

== Vintage gallery ==
A Tucks Post card, published in 1930, could not be unfortunately displayed here, due to licensing issues. It can be seen at this link St. Andrew's Church, Bangalore

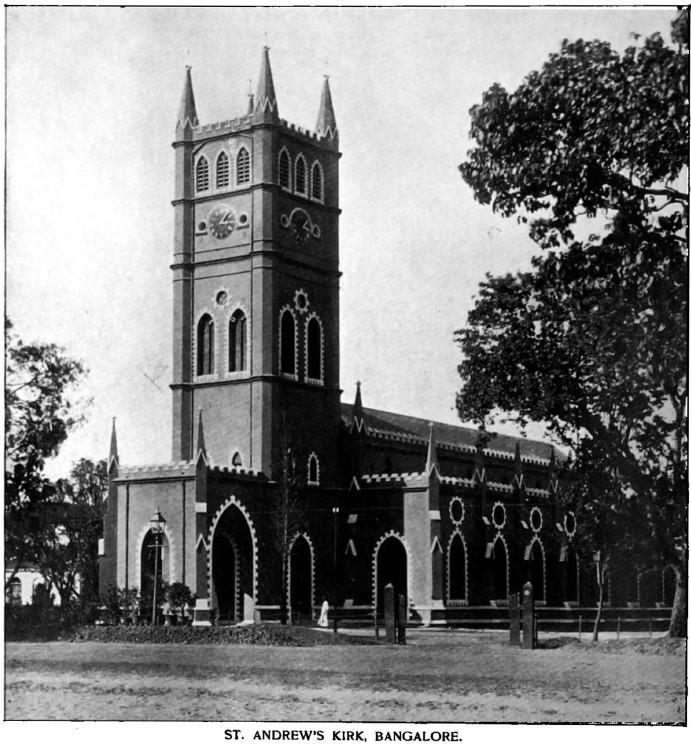
St Andrews Kirk, Bangalore (around 1895), by J H Furneaux

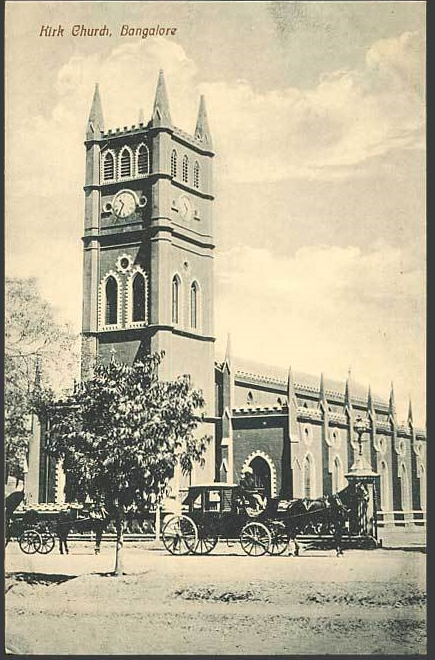
Kirk Church, Bangalore

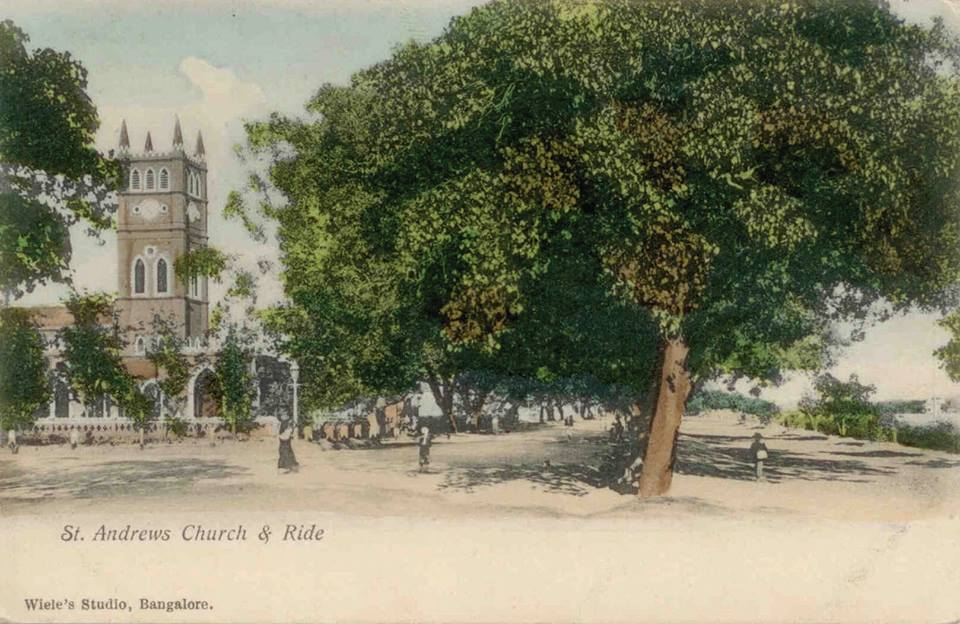
St. Andrews & Ride, Wiele's Studio, Bangalore

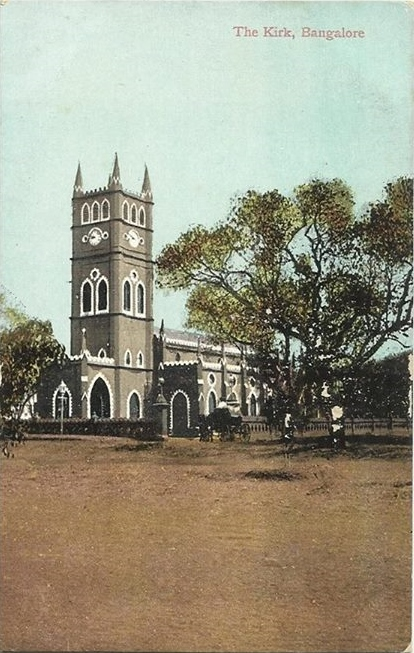
The Kirk, Bangalore

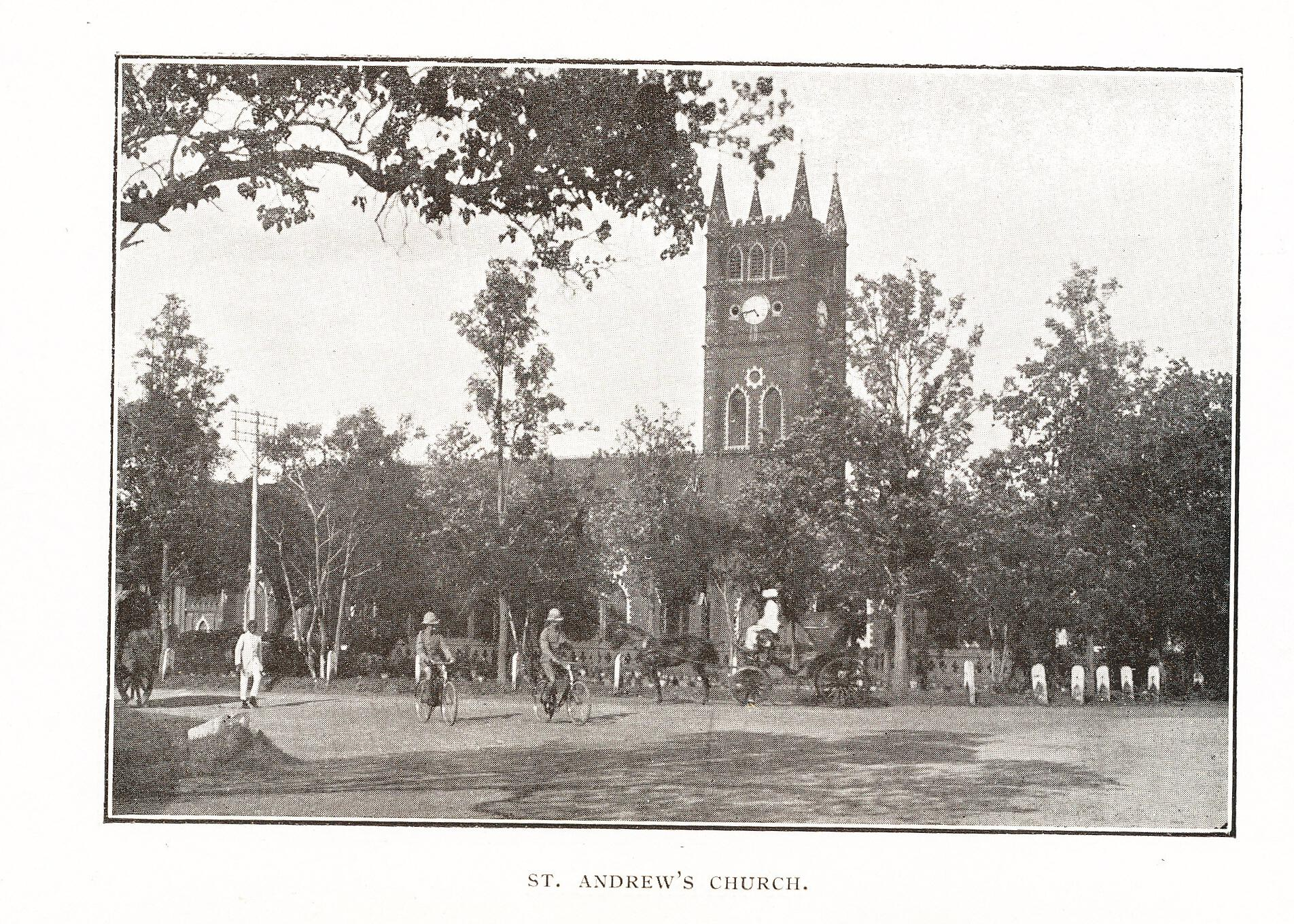
St. Andrews Church, Bangalore (1900), by C H Doveton (seen from Lady Curzon Road)

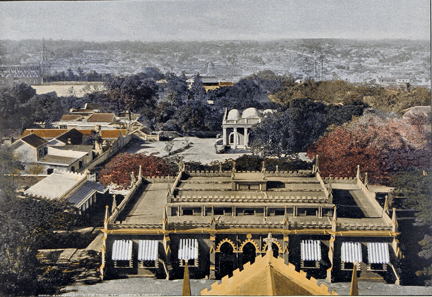
A View from St. Andrew, Bangalore, by Bourne and Shepherd (c.1890) (St. Mary's can be seen on the top left)

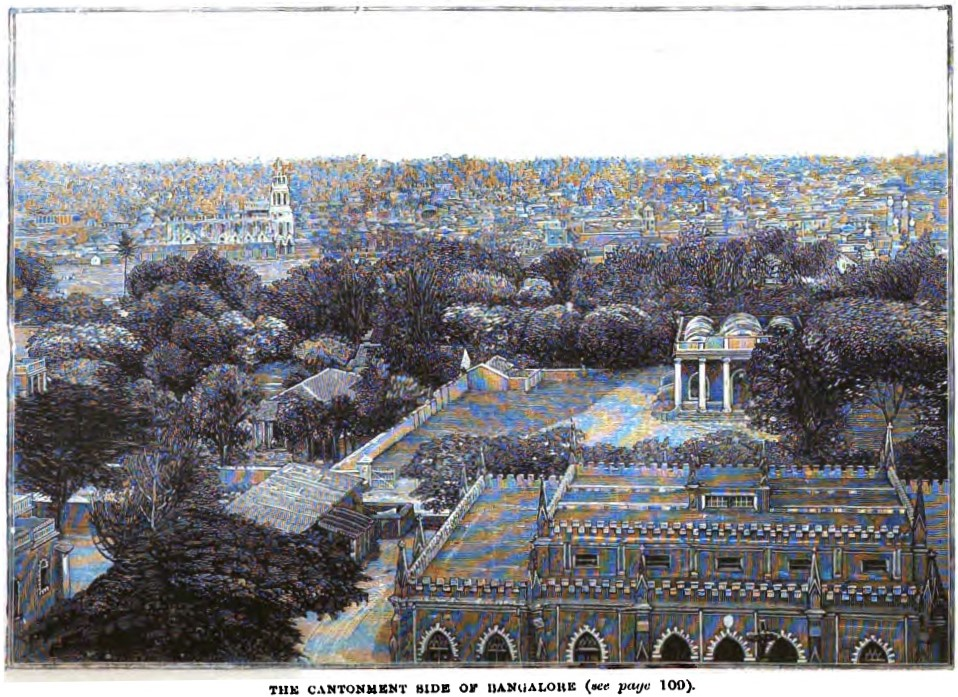
The Cantonment Side of Bangalore (p. 98, 1890), London Missionary Society

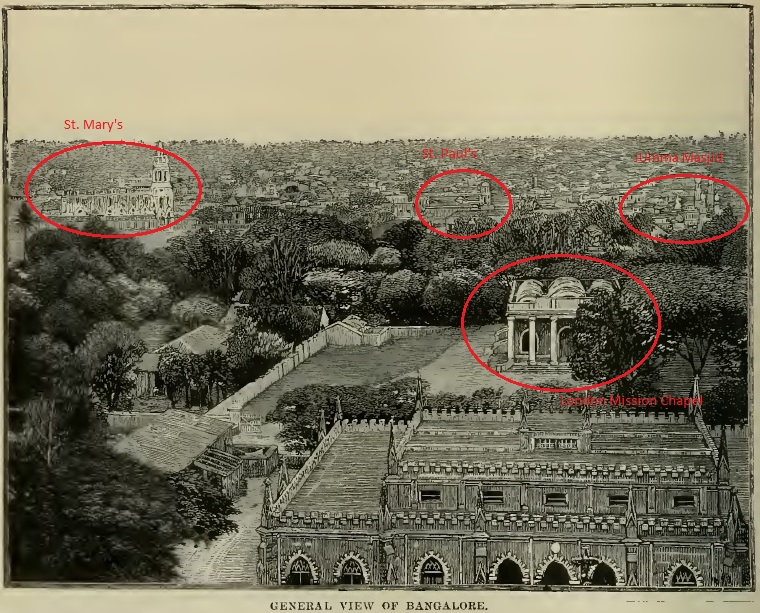
General View of Bangalore (Behind St. Andrew's), Cassell (1890) (St. Mary's and St. Paul's can be seen)

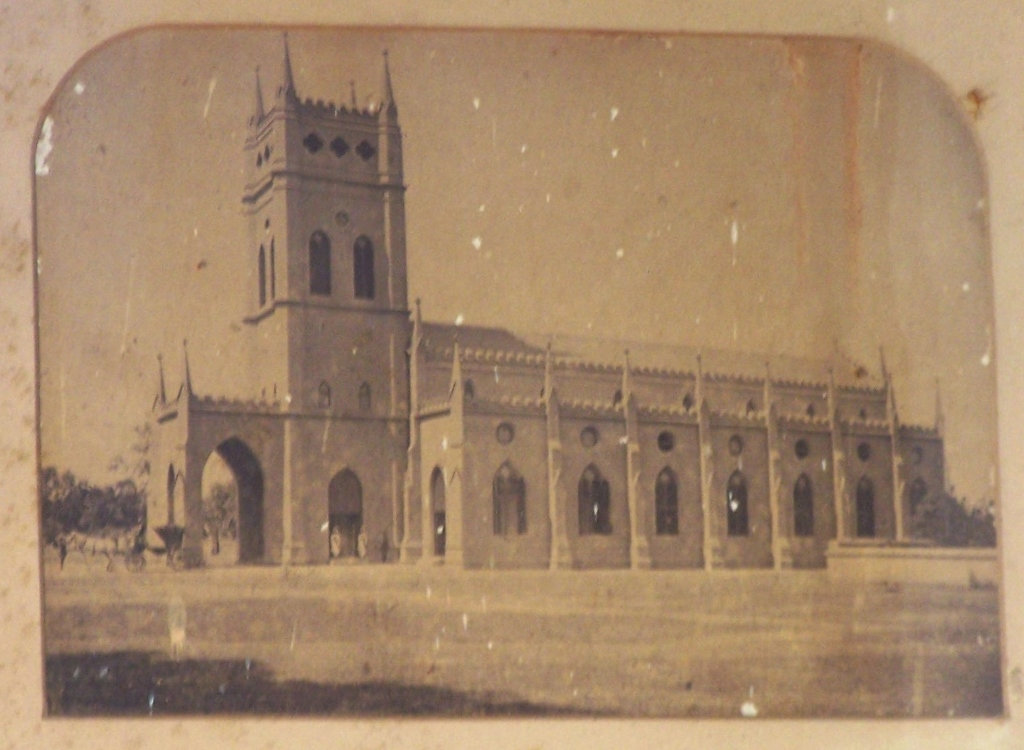
Old photograph of St. Andrew's Church displayed inside the church

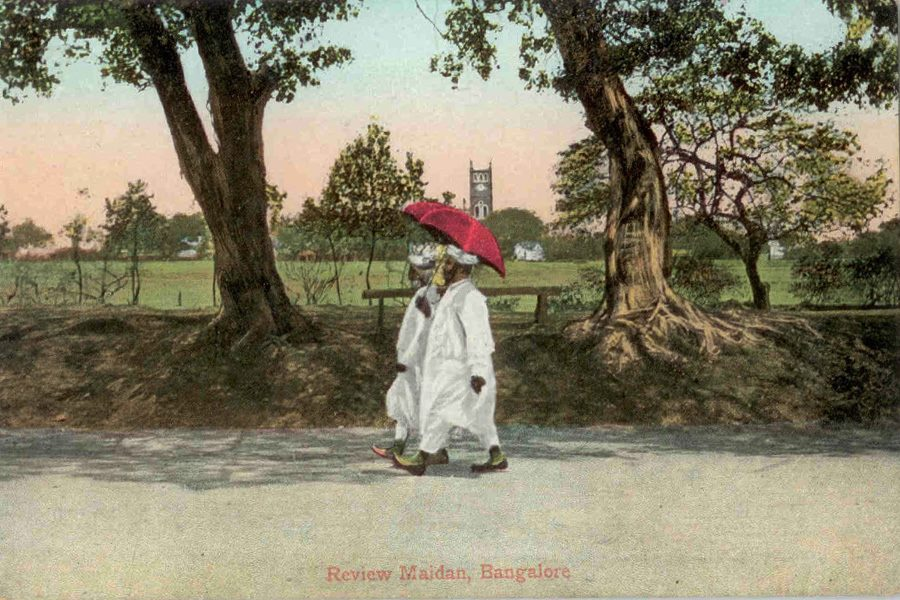
Review Maidan, Bangalore (Mohammedans walking on South Parade, St. Andrew's Seen through the Parade Grounds)

== Garden ==
The church compound has more than 31 species of trees, such as Rain Tree, Nile Tulip, Ashoka Tree, Jacaranda, etc. These offer shelter for migratory birds, which perch on the tree canopy. The churchyard is house to hundreds of mynas, squirrels, barbets, kites and other birds and animals.

== Mission ==
The church started a Socio-economic Development Society in 1977, for the development of children from the under privileged, poor and down trodden segments of society.

== Dateline ==
- 1864 November 22 Foundation stone laid for Church
- 1866 November 18 St. Andrew's Church building dedicated, first sermon preached by Rev. Stewart Wright
- 1869 April 'Kirk Session' of governing-elders formed by Rev. Alex Walker
- 1881 May Pipe Organ installed
- 1893 Tower Clock installed. The Clock manufactured by M/s. Gillette & Johnson (Cryodon) Ltd., England
- 1959 September Affiliation with Church of South India, Rev. P J Child as Presbyter and Rev. Sargent as Bishop.
- 1962 Introduction of CSI Liturgy
- 1963 March Rev. R W Rentoul joined to serve as Presbyter for 6 years
- 1963 April Common Cup for Communion introduced
- 1963 April Indian National Flag bought for Church use
- 1963 June Formation of the 1st Pastorate Committee after first election
- 1963 September Sunday Evening Services started Fellowship coffee arranges after each morning Sunday worship
- 1965 March Separate worship in Kannada introduced, with Rev. G Puttaraj delivering the first sermon in Kannada.
- 1967 July First Joint Service of Kannada and English, to be continued every 1st Sunday of the Month.
- 1969 March Rev. G Hari the first Indian Minister took charge
- 1969 October Harvest Festival introduced
- 1977 February Socio Economic Development Society established and St. Andrew's School in the slum started.
- 1978 August Transfer of the Church property to CSI Trust
- 1981 May Pipe Organ centenary celebrated
- 1982 March Church repainted to restore the original shade - Brick Red
- 1983 Sunday School in Kannada started
- 1985 November Tri-centenary celebration of Bach & Handel, a music festival conducted by the Church Choir
- 1988 July New gate in the old architectural design was installed and dedicated as a gift from Basel Mission Christian Association
- 1988 November Dawn of 125th year in the life and Ministry of the Church with the theme "Congregation in Mission" on St. Andrew's Day festival celebrated on 27 November.
- 1989 February Tower Clock repaired and put back in action with a special rededication worship service. The Clock was repaired at Madras by M/s. P Orr & Sons.

== List of Presbyters (till 1996) ==
- Rev. Stewart Wright (1864-1866)
- Rev. W A Liston (1868, 1874–79)
- Rev. Alexander Walker (1868–71, 1872, 1874–77)
- Rev. A Clifford Bell (1871–74)
- Rev. James Jollie (1879–81, 1884–87)
- Rev. John D Morrison (1881–84)
- Rev. James N Ogilvie (1887–90, 92–93, 94, 95–98)
- Rev. Robert H Stevenson (1890–92, 93–94, 1901, 1904)
- Rev. T Scott (1899)
- Rev. John Heron (1899-1901, 1904–07, 1913–14)
- Rev. A W Mackenzie (1906–07)
- Rev. James Donald Mitchell (1908–11)
- Rev. J G Philip (1911)
- Rev. J H H Macniel (1920–23)
- Rev. D F Mackenzie (1923–25, 1928–30)
- Rev. G C Macpherson (1925–26)
- Rev. G M D Short (1926–28, 1931–35)
- Rev. S W Cameron (1930–31)
- Rev. Dr. A Moffat (1933)
- Rev. K Mackintosh (1935–36)
- Rev. J W Ingram (1935–36)
- Rev. James P Reid (1936–39)
- Rev. L Mac Edward (1939–40)
- Rev. R W Matheson (1942–46)
- Rev. G Buchanan (1946–47)
- Rev. A J Mac Donald (1947)
- Rev. Brady (1947)
- Rev. R E Lec ( 1947–1949)
- Rev. Lewi J Thomas (1950–55)
- Rev. Dr. A Mc Leish (1955–58)
- Rev. Dr. Henry Sedlo (1955–58, 1959)
- Rev. P J Child (1959)
- Rev. W Park Rankin (1960–61)
- Rev. Dr. Chrysostom Arangaden (Associate Presbyter) (1960)
- Rev. David Mackie (1961–63)
- Rev. Appavoo (Associate Presbyter) (1963)
- Rev. R W Rentoul (1963–69)
- Rev. Wisheart (Associate Presbyter) (1969)
- Rev. J Mullins (1969–71)
- Rev. David Harris (Associate Presbyter) (1971)
- Rev. R G Heri (1969–75)
- Rev. Roy Pape (Associate Presbyter) (1975)
- Rev. S A Salins (1975–81)
- Rev. Dr. Wehmeier (Associate Presbyter) (1975)
- Rev. Dr. K C Abraham (1975–76)
- Rev. Benjamin Dorairaj (1981–87)
- Rev. Dr. Christopher Doraisingh (Associate Presbyter) (1987)
- Rev. S Vasanthakumar (1987- )
- Rev. Dr. H. S. Wilson (Associate Presbyter) (1987)
- Rev. Dr. Samson Prabhakar (Associate Presbyter) (1993)
- Rev. Jessie Ranjan (Presbyter-in-Charge) (1993-)
- Rt. Rev. N. D. Ananda Rao Samuel (Associate Presbyter) (1993–94)
- Rev. Manohar Chandra Prasad (Associate Presbyter) (1994–95)
- Rev. Alwin Maben (Assistant Presbyter) (1995-1996)
