= A. E. Inbanathan =

The Reverend A. E. Inbanathan, CSI PhD (Hartford)
- Born: Athisayanathan Emmanuel Inbanathan
- Education: B. D. - United Theological College, Bangalore, (Karnataka), M. A. - Union Theological Seminary, New York (United States), PhD - Hartford Seminary, Hartford, Connecticut (United States)
- Occupation: Pastor
- Parent: Athisayanathan

Ecclesiastical career
- Religion: Christianity
- Church: Church of South India
- Writings: 1949, The Mysticism of Sadhu Sundar Singh, 1951, Karmasamsara: A study in history of doctrine of Hindu theology, 1958, The Christian Message in the Indian Setting, 1960, Man in Christian Thought
- Congregations: Tindivanam, Vellore
- Offices held: Pastor, Church of South India (); Chaplain, Christian Medical College and Hospital, Vellore (−1960)
- Title: The Reverend Doctor

A. E. Inbanathan was the sixth general secretary of the Bible Society of India Central Office in Bangalore, who held the office from 1960 to 1981, the longest ever held by a clergyman.

Inbanathan was a pastor who served in a rural setting in Tindivanam from where he moved on to medical ministry serving as chaplain. During his stint at the Bible Society of India, many translations of the Bible and revisions of the existing versions in the languages of India were undertaken. In 1964, the Ao Naga language Bible was released in the presence of Inbanathan in Impur. Revision of the Telugu language Bible began during the tenure of Inbanathan who along with his colleague, Chrysostom Arangaden, involved Old Testament scholars Victor Premasagar and G. Babu Rao.

== Studies ==
Inbanathan studied at the High School in Tindivanam and the Voorhees College, Vellore, after which he discerned his avocation towards priesthood and underwent ministerial formation between 1939 and 1943 at the United Theological College, Bangalore, affiliated to the nation's first university, the Senate of Serampore College (University), under the principalship of Max Hunter Harrison, after which the university awarded Inbanathan a graduate degree in B.D. by then registrar C. E. Abraham.

In 1949, Inbanathan moved to the Union Theological Seminary (New York City) affiliated to the Columbia University where he pursued a postgraduate course. Inbanathan also pursued research studies in comparative religion at the Hartford Seminary which he completed in 1951. Many interesting facets about A. E. Inbanathan during his time in America have been recorded in journals. The Quarterly Review of the Union Theological Seminary (New York City) wrote, He was young, intelligent and with an attractive personality.. The General Synod of the Reformed Church of America noted, Rev. A. E. Inbanathan, pastor of one of the churches in South India has completed his studies in America and is enroute to his home. He has been an inspiration to all who have met him.

== Ecclesiastical ministry ==
=== As rural pastor ===
Inbanathan was a pastor of the South India United Church which later unionized itself into the Church of South India and served in Tindivanam, the town in which the theologian D. S. Amalorpavadass schooled. As a rural pastor in Tindivanam, Inbanathan was able to understand the ethos of India enabling him to interact with people and gain pastoral experience at the ground level.

=== As medical chaplain ===
As chaplain of the Christian Medical College and Hospital, Vellore, Inbanathan played an active role both in chaplaincy as well and in administration of the Association and Council of the College as Secretary.

=== As administrator ===
In 1960, Inbanathan moved to the Bible Society of India, Bangalore, and took up the position of general secretary of the society that was involved in Translations, Resource Mobilisation, Production and Distribution of the Sacred Scriptures with focus on India. When Inbanathan took up the office of General Secretary of the Bible Society of India, there were ten auxiliaries including one in Ceylon. Inbanathan's rural pastoral experience enabled him to manage the country-level auxiliaries at a better level with his successive colleagues at the auxiliary level consisting of E. Prakasam, A. B. Masilamani, B. G. Prasada Rao and others.

With a record service of nearly 21 years, Inbanathan was a name to reckon with in India. Inbanathan ensured that the Bible Society of India worked together with the Senate of Serampore College (University) and the National Council of Churches in India and the other ecclesiastical institutions.

In matters of administration at the Bible Society of India, Inbanathan worked closely with J. S. S. Malelu, then president of the Bible Society of India, as well as the other successors.

Inbanathan also played a role at the United Bible Societies. In 1969, Inbanathan was elected as the chairperson of the General Committee of the United Bible Societies. In subsequent meetings of the United Bible Societies, Inbanathan was also elected as the chairperson of the Council of the United Bible Societies.

Inbanathan retired from the Bible Society of India in 1981 during the presidency of Alexander Mar Thoma.

== Other ==
During the World Council of Churches conclave held from 19 November through 5 December 1961, Inbanathan participated in the Assembly as a fraternal delegate of the United Bible Societies and also spoke on 1 December on the topic The Bible and Evangelism in the presence of the Archbishop of York, The Most Reverend Donald Coggan.

Inbanathan was also a participant at one of the synods of the Church of South India Synod.

Other offices
Preceded by W. Park Rankin; 1959–1960	General Secretary, Bible Society of India, Bangalore; 1960–1981	Succeeded by O. M. Mani; 1981
