= John Philipose =

Indian biblical scholar

The Reverend Doctor John Philipose
- Education: B.Sc. Madras Christian College, 1958, B.D. (Serampore), 1970, MTh. Princeton Theological Seminary, New Jersey, USA, 1975, Ph.D. in New Testament (Andrews)
- Alma mater: Madras Christian College, United Theological College, Bangalore, Princeton Theological Seminary, New Jersey, USA, University of St. Andrews, Scotland
- Occupations: Ecclesiastical Administrator and Translations Scholar
- Religion: Christianity
- Writings: see section
- Offices held: Minister, Church of South India (-1968), NT Consultant, Bible Society of India(1968-1984), Translations Consultant, United Bible Societies (-1984), Director, (Translations), Bible Society of India, Bangalore (1984-1991)
- Title: The Reverend Doctor

John Philipose is a New Testament Scholar who served as the Director of Translations at the Bible Society of India, Bangalore during 1984-1991 succeeding M. P. John. Philipose was involved in various translations and revisions of the Bible into the many Indian languages and used to contribute to scholarly journals like The Bible Translator.

== Studies ==
After graduate studies in sciences from Madras Christian College, Tambaram leading to B.Sc., John Philipose joined the United Theological College, Bangalore in 1955 to discern his avocation towards priesthood during the Principalship of J. R. Chandran and completed his studies in 1958 leading to the award of the graduate degree B.D. by the Senate of Serampore College (University) during the Registrarship of C. E. Abraham. He completed his MTh from Princeton Theological Seminary, New Jersey in 1970. For later studies, Philipose enrolled at the University of St. Andrews where he specialized in New Testament leading to the award of Ph.D. by the University in 1975 under Professor Mathew Black.

== Ecclesiastical ministry ==
Philipose was earlier Translations Consultant with the United Bible Societies who was appointed during the tenure of C. Arangaden and was based in Bangalore. Philipose worked together with his Translation team across India consisting of M. P. John, Victor Premasagar, G. Babu Rao, Basil Rebera and others. In the mid-eighties, Philipose was appointed as the Director, Translations at the Bible Society of India where he succeeded his colleague, M. P. John and held the post until 1991 till the appointment of the Old Testament Scholar, G. D. V. Prasad.

== Works ==
- Philipose, John (1975). Western non-interpolations and related phenomena in the Gospels.
- ——— (1977). Off the beaten track: Some problems of translation.
- ———; Arangaden, Chrysostom (1992). Carey's legacy of Bible translation.
- ——— (1992). Kurios in Luke: A Diagnosis.

== Translations ==
As a Translator, John Philipose translated some of the portions of the Bible into Malayalam along with K. C. Abraham and M. K. Cherian,

- 1973, The resurrection of the Lord Jesus (in Malayalam),
- 1975, The man you cannot ignore ... (in Malayalam),
- 1976, The way of life : the Gospel according to Saint John (in Malayalam),
