= C. V. Mathew =

Bishop

Bishop Dr. C V Mathew
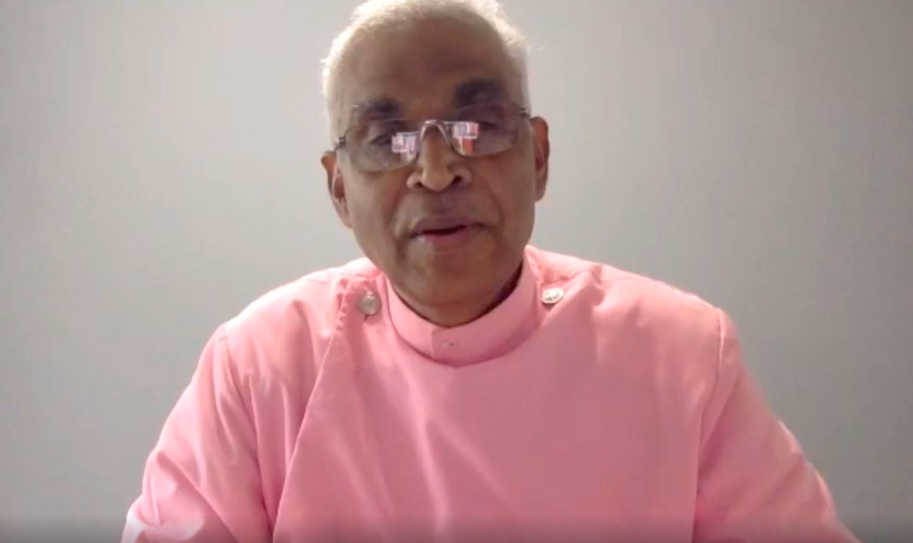
- Church: St. Thomas Evangelical Church of India
- Predecessor: Bishop Dr. M K Koshy
- Successor: Bishop. Dr. Thomas Abraham

Orders
- Consecration: 28 November 2008

C. V. Mathew is a bishop of the St. Thomas Evangelical Church of India. He was the presiding bishop of the St. Thomas Evangelical Church of India from 2008 until his retirement on 31 December 2018. His area of specialization was in a Christian response to Hindu fundamentalism.

== Career ==
Positions held by Mathew include

- Priest of St. Thomas Evangelical Church of India
- Episcopal
- Presiding Bishop of St. Thomas Evangelical Church of India from 2008 to 2018.
- President Bible Society of India - Kerala Auxiliary
- Chairman of the Evangelical Fellowship of India - the grouping of all evangelical churches, organisations and ministries in the country.
- Director of World Vision international Asia Pacific Region
- Deputy Chairman of the Lausanne Committee of world Evangelization
- Principal of Jubilee Memorial Bible College, Chennai.
- Academic Dean - India's largest evangelical seminary.

He has also served as the Vicar of different parishes of the St Thomas Evangelical Church of India.

== Writings ==
- Area of Light: The Indian Church and Modernisation by Charles Corwin, C. V. Mathew. Hardcover, ISPCK, ISBN 81-7214-166-1 (81-7214-166-1)
- Jubilee Reflections: Essays on Selected Theological Issues by C.V. Mathew. Softcover, Indian Society for Promoting Christian Knowledge, The, ISBN 81-7214-591-8 (81-7214-591-8) Mission in Context:
- Missiological Reflections Essays in Honour of Roger E. Hedlund and June Hedlund by I.S.P.C.K. (Organization), Roger E. Hedlund, Mylapore Institute for Indigenous Studies, C. V. Mathew, June Hedlund. Hardcover, MIIS/ISPCK, ISBN 81-7214-722-8 (81-7214-722-8)
- The Saffron Mission: A Historical Analysis of Modern Hindu Missionary Ideologies and Practices by C. V. Mathew. Hardcover, Indian Society for Promoting Christian Knowledge, ISBN 81-7214-537-3 (81-7214-537-3)

== Past students ==
During a stint at the Union Biblical Seminary, Pune, Mathew's students included Jonadob Nathaniel, the current director of translations of the Bible Society of India and B. Samuel Raja Sekhar, the current auxiliary secretary of the Bible Society of India Andhra Pradesh Auxiliary.
