= Rene Van de Walle =

Bible scholar

The Reverend Father Rene Van de Walle, SJ Teacher - in - Old Testament (1958-1989) De Nobili College, Poona (Maharashtra)
- Born: January 28, 1924; Larrey, Côte-d'Or (France)
- Died: June 9, 2009 (aged 85); Bruges (Belgium)
- Education: B.Th. (JDV); L.S.S. (PIB)
- Alma mater: Sacred Heart College, Shembaganur (Tamil Nadu); St. Aloysius Minor Seminary, Ranchi (Jharkhand); De Nobili College, Pune (Maharashtra); Pontifical Biblical Institute, Rome (Italy)
- Occupation: Spiritual Formator
- Years active: 1957-2009 (52 years)
- Known for: Exegesis on Wisdom Literature

Ecclesiastical career
- Religion: Christianity
- Church: Roman Catholic Church (Society of Jesus)
- Ordained: 1957
- Congregations: Ranchi (India) and Menen (Belgium)
- Offices held: Translator, Bible Society of India, Bombay Auxiliary; President, Society for Biblical Studies in India; Member, Catholic Biblical Association of India
- Title: The Reverend Father

René Van de Walle (28 January 1924 - 9 June 2009) was a Belgian Jesuit priest, biblical scholar, and academic. He specialized in the Old Testament and taught at the major National Catholic Seminary of Jnana Vidyadeepth in Pune (India). He contributed to scholarly research through his writings which appeared in the major theological journals in India for nearly two decades.

== Biography ==
Born in Larrey, Côte-d'Or (France) on 28 January 1924 the young René entered the novitiate of the Jesuits in Drongen (Belgium), on the 7 September 1945. After a year of preparation – learning Sanskrit and Indian civilization – in Wépion, he sails off to India where he first spends another year of language study (Hindi) in Hazaribagh. Then follow philosophical studies in Shembaganur near Kodaikanal (1949–1952).

After two years of educational experience among the tribals of Chotanagpur (Ranchi) René is sent for theological studies in Pune, at the De Nobili College, from 1954 to 1958, with priestly ordination by Bishop Andreas D’Souza (of Pune) at the end of the third year, on March 24, 1957.

However, given his intellectual bent, the young priest is destined for higher ecclesiastical education, and hence sent for a two years ‘biennium’ at the Pontifical Biblical Institute in Rome (1960–1963). His dissertation - required for the doctoral degree -, deals with The Murmuring of the Jews in the Wilderness. While in Rome, on the 2 February 1963, he makes his final religious profession in the Society of Jesus.

Back in India Fr Van de Walle immediately begins his academic career at the national Seminary (nowadays Jnana Deepa Vidyapeeth’) in Pune (then Poona), a major town of Maharashtra, east of Mumbai, on the West coast of India. There Van de Walle was Professor of Old Testament and was associated with the revision of the Marathi Bible produced by the Bible Society of India.

Father van de Walle lived in Pune (then Poona) continuously until health concerns forced him to return to his home country, Belgium (in 1989), where he carried out his priestly ministry in the Menin area. He then joined the Jesuit retirement home of Heverlee, where he passed away on the 9 June 2009.

== Writings ==
- 1965, An Administrative Body of Priests and a Consecrated People,
- 1967, Welcome address at the biennial of the Society for Biblical Studies in India,
- 1969, The sin in the garden and the sinfulness of the world,
- 1975, Jesus - Christ of Atonement or Christ The New Man?,
- 1975, The Prophets' Call for Renewal and Reconciliation,
- 1978, (co-translated with Christopher T. Begg), Parables of Jesus. Insight and Challenge
- 1978, Death and beyond in the sapiential literature,
- 1981, Israel's Relations with the Nations,
- 1983, Esther and Judith, Two Valiant Women,
- 1986, The Various Facets of Man in Wisdom Literature,
- 1986, Wisdom,
- 1989, The Minor Prophets as Conscientizers,
- No date, A comparative study on Psalm 139 and Hymn IV, 16 of Atharvaveda,

Professional and academic associations
Preceded by D. F. Hudson, BMS; 1966-1968; K. V. Mathew, MMTSC; 1983-1984	President; Society for Biblical Studies in India; 1968-1970; 1984-1986	Succeeded by E. C. John, CSI; 1970-1972; S. Joseph, STBC; 1986-1988
Academic offices
Preceded by	Professor of Old Testament, De Nobili College, Pune, Maharashtra	Succeeded by
