= Bible Society of India =

Christian organisation

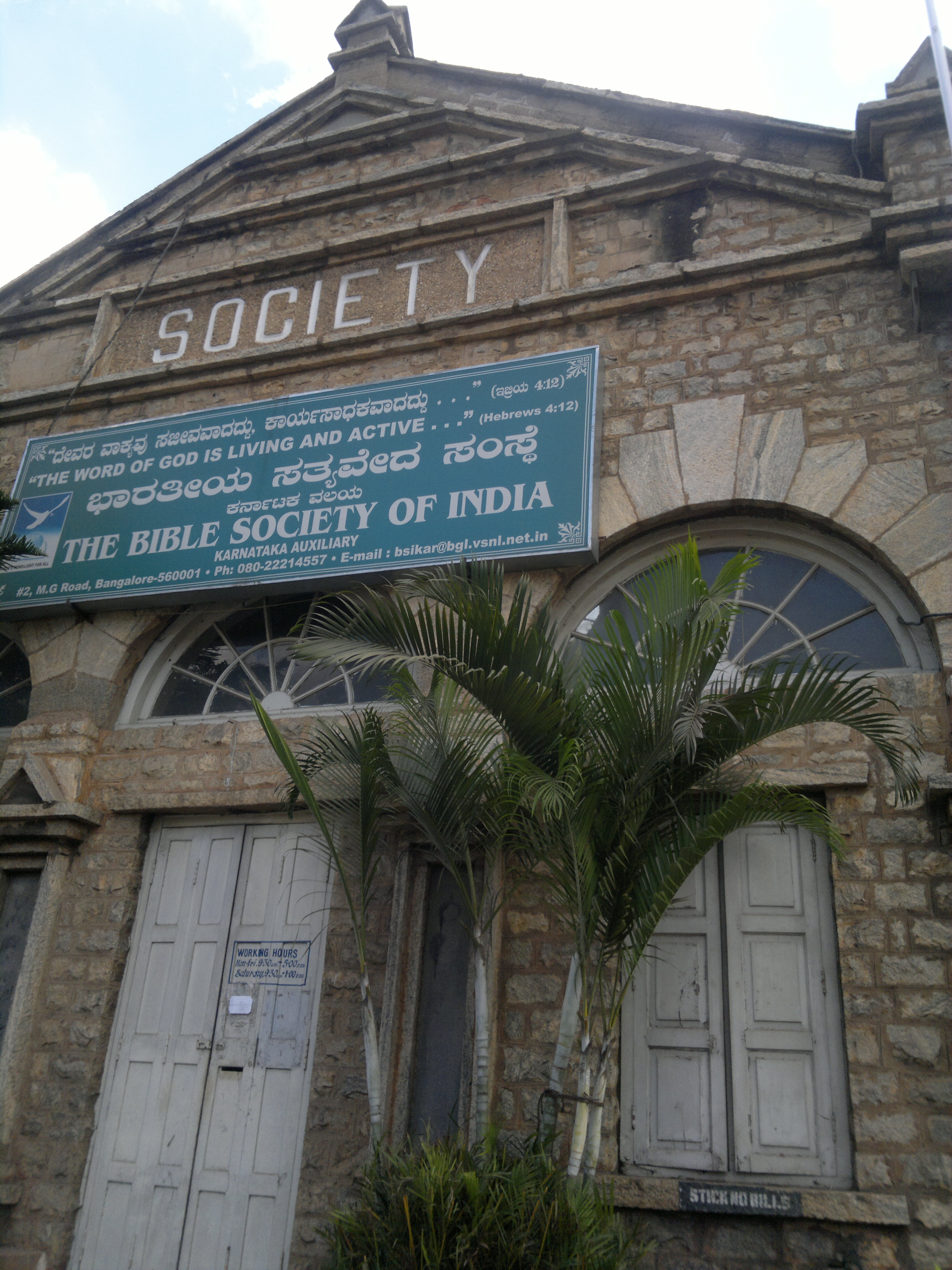
- Bible Society of India - earlier office situated on Cubbon Park end - The Karnataka Auxiliary is now situated in this premises.
- Abbreviation: BSI
- Predecessor: The British and Foreign Bible Society in India and Ceylon
- Formation: 21 February 1811
- Founder: The British and Foreign Bible Society
- Founded at: Nagpur
- Type: Bible Society
- Legal status: Society
- Purpose: Literary
- Headquarters: Bangalore
- Location: India
- Region served: Indian subcontinent
- Services: Contribution, Translation, Printing, Distribution
- Official language: English
- Secretary General: Rev. Dr. Kavito G. Zhimo
- President: Rev. Dr. Leelavathi Vemuri
- Vice-President: Rev. Dr. Bijaya Kumar Pattnaik
- Treasurer: Mr. Deepak George Pothan
- Directors: Translations: The Rev. Dr. W. Along Jamir, D.Th. (Serampore); Church Relations and Resource Mobilisation: The Dr. Hrangthan Chhungi, D. Th. (Serampore) (Associate Director), Marketing and Publishing: Mr. Paul Stephen (Sr. Director), Media, Communications and Information Technology: Mr. Caleb Martin Hilton (Associate Director), Finance: Mr. Tinku George (Director)
- Main organ: India Bible Society Trust Association (IBSTA)
- Parent organization: United Bible Societies
- Subsidiaries: 17
- Affiliations: United Bible Societies
- Website: https://www.bsind.org/
- Remarks: Sowing Circle (A publication of the BSI)
- Formerly called: The Bible Society of India and Ceylon

The Bible Society of India is a Christian body that is authorized to translate, produce, distribute and market the Bible and is a member of the United Bible Societies.

The motto of the Society is to translate the word of God into languages, which people can understand, in a format they have access to, and produce the scriptures at a price people could afford to buy. The Bible Society works together with many organizations in India to translate the Bible into various languages of India. The Bible is now available in 74 Indian languages, the New Testament in 92 additional languages, Braille Bibles in 15 Indian languages for visually impaired people, and Scripture portions in 48 languages.

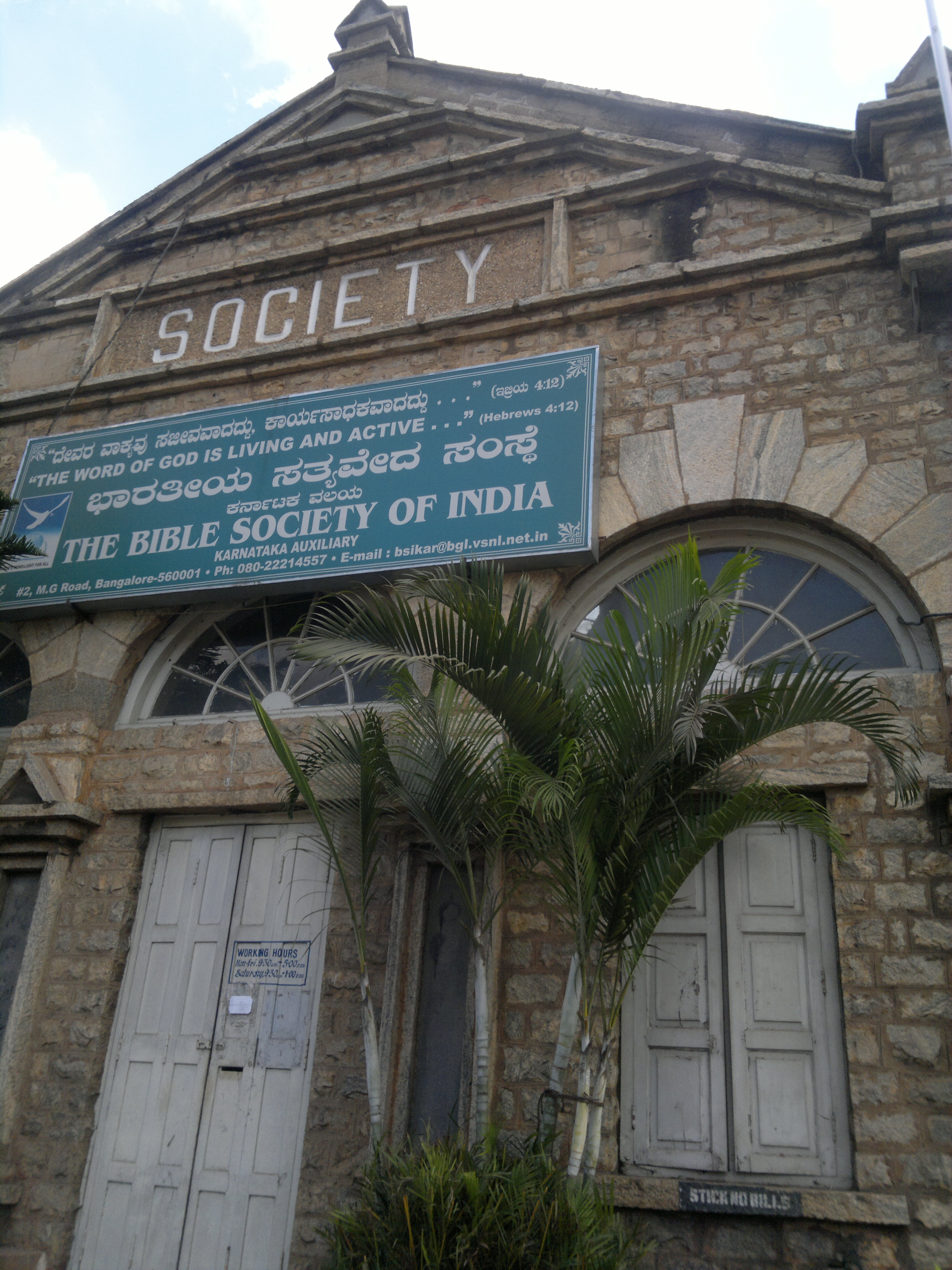

== History ==
On 21 February 1811, a meeting was held "at the college of Fort William for the propriety of instituting a Bible Society, as Auxiliary to the British and Foreign Bible Society established in London", entitled "The Calcutta Auxiliary Bible Society" with the same objectives as those in London." This Auxiliary Bible Society in Serampore, West Bengal first began an attempt to coordinate the supply of Scriptures to existing Christians in Portuguese, Tamil, Cingalese, Malayalam, and Canarese languages. They sent 5,000 Cingalese (Sinhalese) New Testaments to a new Auxiliary Bible Society in Ceylon formed in August 1812.

The headquarters of the Bible Society of India moved from Nagpur to Bangalore in 1950, under the leadership of General Secretary Premanand Mahanty. The Central Office of the Bible Society of India is located in Bangalore city in the state of Karnataka in South India.

== The Translations ==
Succession of Translation Directors
- 1960-1981 The Rev. C. Arangaden, Th.M. (Princeton),
- 1981-1984 The Rev. M. P. John, Ph.D. (Chicago),
- 1984-1991 The Rev. John Philipose, Ph.D. (St.Andrews),
- 1991-2011 The Rev. G. D. V. Prasad, M. Th. (Serampore),
- 2011-2021 The Rev. Jonadob Nathaniel, D.Th. (SEAGST)
- 2021- The Rev. Dr. W. Along Jamir, D.Th. (Serampore)

=== Sources for translating and revising ===
The Society depends on original sources material of the scriptures available in Biblical Hebrew, Biblical Aramaic and Biblical Greek languages for which the sources include the Biblia Hebraica Stuttgartensia and the Novum Testamentum Graece.

=== Pool of Scholars trained in Biblical languages ===
Since the beginning, the Society worked together with the National Council of Churches in India and the Senate of Serampore College (University) and the first Translations Director, C. Arangaden helped found the Society for Biblical Studies in India (SBSI) which had been fully-ecumenical consisting of Biblical Scholars from the Catholic, Orthodox, Protestant, and Charismatic Church Societies.

Father Rene Van de Walle a member of the Society for Biblical Studies in India was associated with the revision of the Marathi Bible. Similarly, Father Lucien Legrand was associated with the inter-confessional translation in Tamil language. With this background, the Society systematically built up a pool of Biblical Scholars who specialised in Old Testament with Biblical Aramaic and Biblical Hebrew and also New Testament with Biblical Greek. The Scholars include Yisu Das Tiwari, B. E. Devaraj, C. Arangaden, Victor Premasagar, E. C. John, K. V. Mathew, M. P. John, John Philipose, Gnana Robinson, G. Babu Rao, Timotheas Hembrom, Nitoy Achümi, Basil Rebera, S. John Theodore and others.

=== Inter-confessional translations ===
The Society translates and revises the scriptures from the original Biblical languages without prejudice to Protestant, Orthodox, Catholic or Charismatic. As such, the translations of the Society are held in regard by the Christians. Though the Catholics did not have scriptures in a language of their own, it was the outcome of the Second Vatican Council which paved way for the vernacular translations.

Old Testament and New Testament Scholars of the Catholic Churches worked together with the Society to either translate or revise vernacular translations and were also instrumental in inter-confessional translations. The Rev. Father D. S. Amalorpavadass was a strong proponent for the inter-confessional translations making the Bible Society to come out with one such version in Tamil language. In other languages of India too, the Catholic Fathers were very much in favour of an inter-confessional translation.

In the recent times, the Society works together with the Conference of Catholic Bishops of India led by Fr. Govindu Rayanna, a New Testament Scholar and a member of the Society for Biblical Studies in India.

=== The Translation Directors ===
The Directors who led the translation at the Society were notable in the Senate of Serampore College (University) having taught at either the constituent College of the University or its affiliated institutions. It was during the period of C. Arangaden that the translations department was built up together with the General Secretary, the rural Pastor, A. E. Inbanathan had much understanding of the Church and Christianity in India and worked together with the Senate of Serampore College (University). It was during their tenure that thoroughbred Scholars were appointed throughout India leading to quality translations.

Auxiliaries of the Bible Society of India
No.	Founding year	Name of the Auxiliary	Location	State	Secretary
I.	1983	Aizawl Auxiliary	Aizawl	Mizoram	Rev Remlal Faka
II.	1845	Allahabad Auxiliary	Allahabad	Uttar Pradesh	Rev. Gershombhai Khirsti (Pro tem)
III.	1951	Andhra Pradesh Auxiliary	Guntur	Andhra Pradesh	Rev. Rev John Vikram (CSI) BD., M.Th.,
IV.	2020	BSI Andaman Nicobar Auxiliary	Port Blair	Andaman Nicobar Island	The Dn. Ranjit Paswan
V.	1813	Bombay Auxiliary	Mumbai	Maharashtra	Rev. Clement Christian
VI.	1811	Calcutta Auxiliary	Kolkata	West Bengal	Rev. Soma Bhatkar
VII.	1986	Dimapur Auxiliary	Dimapur	Nagaland	Rev. Yiepetso Wezah, D. Th. (Serampore)
VIII.	1969	Gujarat Auxiliary	Ahmedabad	Gujarat	Rev. Ashish Amin
IX.	1986	Jabalpur Auxiliary	Jabalpur	Madhya Pradesh	Rev. Daniel Nath
X.	1945	Karnataka Auxiliary	Bangalore	Karnataka	Rev. Ms. B. S. Shashikala Alva, CSI, M. Th. (Serampore)
XI.	1956	Kerala Auxiliary	Kottayam	Kerala	The Rev. Jacob Antony Koodathinkal
XII.	1953	North West India Auxiliary	New Delhi	New Delhi	The Rev. Gershombhai Khirsti, CNI, B. D. (Serampore)
XIII.	1983	Odisha Auxiliary	Cuttack	Odisha	The Rev. B. K. Kouri
XIV.	1966	Ranchi Auxiliary	Ranchi	Jharkhand	The Rev. Ms. Neelam Tigga
XV.	1956	Shillong Auxiliary	Shillong	Meghalaya	The Rev. V.T.S. Langstieh
XVI.	1820	Tamil Nadu Auxiliary	Chennai	Tamil Nadu	The Rev. P. Moses Devadason, CSI, B. D. (Serampore)
XVII.	2016	Telangana Auxiliary	Secunderabad	Telangana	The Rev. John Basy Paul, CSI, M. Th. (Serampore)

== Management of the Society ==
The Society has been led by able administrators hailing from the Clergy. During 1980 when a gap arose, the Society had to appoint Laymen for a temporary period but with the appointment of The Rev. M. Mani Chacko, an Old Testament Scholar and a member of the Society for Biblical Studies in India (SBSI), the Society is again led by the Clergy.

=== General Secretaries ===
Though General Secretaries were in short tenures, it was the rural Pastor, The Rev. A. E. Inbanathan who held the longest tenure and built up the society in all spheres in Translation, Promotion, Distribution and Resource Mobilisation.

Years	Succession of General Secretaries	Earned Academic Credentials/Other notes
1944-1947	The Rev. J. S. M. Hooper, WMMS,	B. A. (Oxford), M. A. (Oxford)/ Kaisar-i-Hind Medal 1938
1947-1949	The Rev. George Sinker, C of E	
1949-1958	Mr. Premananda Mohanty^{Laity}	M. A. (Calcutta)/ M. L. A. - Odisha Legislative Assembly 1937-1946
1958-1959	Ms. Marjorie Harrison^{Laity}	
1959-1960	The Rev. W. Park Rankin, MCI	
1960-1981	The Rev. A. E. Inbanathan, CSI	B. D. (Serampore), M. A. (Union), Ph.D. (Hartford)
1981	Major General O. M. Mani, Corps^{Laity}	Retired Military Officer of the Indian Army Corps of Engineers
1981-1982	Mr. T. Albert Manoraj, IPS^{Laity}	Retired Police Official
1982-1985	Mr. T. John Ramakrishnan, IAS^{Laity}	Retired Civil Servant
1985-2011	Mr. B. K. Pramanik, OSCS^{Laity}	Odisha State Service Official who voluntarily resigned from the service
2011-2023	The Rev. M. Mani Chacko, CSI	B. D. (Serampore), M. Th. (Serampore), Ph.D. (London)
2023-	Rev. Dr. Kavito G. Zhimo	An Ordained Baptist minister from Nagaland. He served as the pioneering founding principal of Trinity Theological College, Dimapur, for 26 years (1992-2000 and 2004 -2022). Some of his important leadership position includes, President of the Sumi Baptist Theological Association (1990–1993), President of the Council of Baptist Churches in North East India (2012–2015), President of the Senate of Serampore College, University (2017–2019) and Chairperson of the Board of Theological Education of the Senate of Serampore College (2017–2019).

== Sowing Circle ==
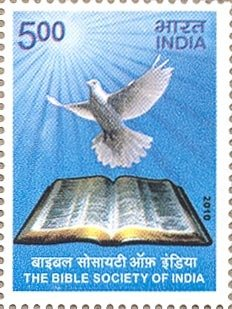
Stamp of India 2010 The Bible Society of India

Sowing Circle is a triannual magazine published in English in Bangalore by the Bible Society of India, for private circulation, containing reviews of its work throughout the Indian subcontinent.

The magazine has often been referred to by Scholars and other Writers. David Vumlallian Zou of the University of Delhi in The Pasts of a Fringe Community: Ethno-history and Fluid Identity of the Zou in Manipur has substantially cited the magazine in matters relating to translations in Zou language.
