= J. S. M. Hooper =

General Secretary of the Bible Society of India

The Reverend Doctor John Stirling Morley Hooper D. D. (Honoris causa)
- Born: 12 April 1882; Stirling, Scotland
- Died: 2 May 1974 (aged 92); Stratford-upon-Avon, England
- Citizenship: British
- Education: B. A. (Oxford); M. A. (Oxford)
- Alma mater: Corpus Christi College, Oxford
- Occupation: Pastor
- Years active: 1905–1947
- Parent: John Henry Hooper
- Religion: Christianity
- Church: Wesleyan Methodist Church (Great Britain)
- Offices held: Headmaster, Wesley Higher Secondary School, Chennai (1930), general secretary, British and Foreign Bible Society in India, Nagpur (1932–1944), general secretary, Bible Society of India, Nagpur (1944–1947)

J. S. M. Hooper was the first General Secretary of the Bible Society of India on its creation on 1 November 1944. Hooper was also involved in translations of the Bible Society of India.

== Contribution ==
Archana Venkatesan, Associate Professor of Religious Studies and Comparative Literature at the University of California, Berkeley in an English version of Nammalwar's A Hundred Measures of Time: Tiruviruttam has referred to a publication of J. S. M. Hooper in 1929 titled Hymns of the Alvars and has devoted a lengthy footnote on the life and times of Hooper, especially the period when he came to India, his contribution to the ecumenical efforts resulting in the formation of the Church of South India and to the Bible Society of India. Archana also writes that Hooper worked closely with Lesslie Newbigin and V. S. Azariah, both of whom were pioneers in the ecumenical efforts towards the formation of the Church of South India.

=== Education ===
After taking B. A. and M. A. degrees at Corpus Christi College, Oxford, Hooper came to India in 1905 and stayed in Chennai serving as a Pastor of the Wesleyan Methodist Church. In 1930, Hooper served as Headmaster of the Wesley High School.

=== Ecumenism ===
As a Wesleyan, Hooper was involved in the negotiations with the Anglicans and other Protestant congregations towards working forward towards ecumenism which ultimately resulted in the formation of the Church of South India in 1947 at the St. George's Cathedral, Chennai.

=== Translations of the Bible into the languages of India ===
Hooper became the first General Secretary of the British and Foreign Bible Society in India in 1932 and continued till 1944. When the Bible Society of India was formed on 1 November 1944, Hooper became the first general secretary and held the position from 1944 until 1947.

== Writings ==
- 1918, The approach to the Gospel : addresses delivered to the Annual Conference of the American Presbyterian Mission of Western India at Panhala, Kolhapur,
- 1920, The approach to the Gospel,
- 1929, Hymns of the Āl̤vars,
- 1938, The Bible in India : with a chapter on Ceylon (republished in 1963),
- 1944, Life eternal : addresses delivered at the Kodaikanal missionary convention,
- 1947, A Call to Prayer to the Uniting Churches in South India
- 1948, The temptation and the establishment of the kingdom of God,
- 1957, Greek New Testament terms in Indian languages : a comparative word list,
- 1963, Bible translation in India, Pakistan and Ceylon (original version published in 1938; Revised by W. J. Culshaw),
- 1963, The story of Methodism in Stratford-upon-Avon,

== Recognition ==
The Emperor of India awarded the medal of Kaisar-i-Hind Medal in 1938 to Hooper for his meritorious service with the British and Foreign Bible Society in India. Nearly two decades later, the nation's first University, the Senate of Serampore College, West Bengal, conferred a Doctor of Divinity (honoris causa) upon Hooper in 1957.

Educational offices
Preceded by T. R. Foulger; 1927–1930	Headmaster, Wesley Higher Secondary School, Chennai; 1930	Succeeded by H. E. C. Pettet; 1930–1932
Other offices
Preceded by Post created	General Secretary, British and Foreign Bible Society in India/ Bible Society of India, Nagpur; 1932–1944/1944-1947	Succeeded by George Sinker; 1947–1949
Honorary titles
Preceded by -	Kaisar-i-Hind Medal; 1938	Succeeded by
Preceded by Thomas Sitther, Arthur Marcuss Ward, 1955	Doctor of Divinity (honoris causa); Senate of Serampore College, West Bengal; 1957	Succeeded by Sudhir Kumar Chatterjee, Henry George Howard, Wilfred Scopes, Hospet Sumitra, 1958

== Archives ==
A collection of archival material related to Rev J. Sterling M. Hooper can be found at the Cadbury Research Library, University of Birmingham.
