= Ashley William Joseph =

Indian composer (born 1965)

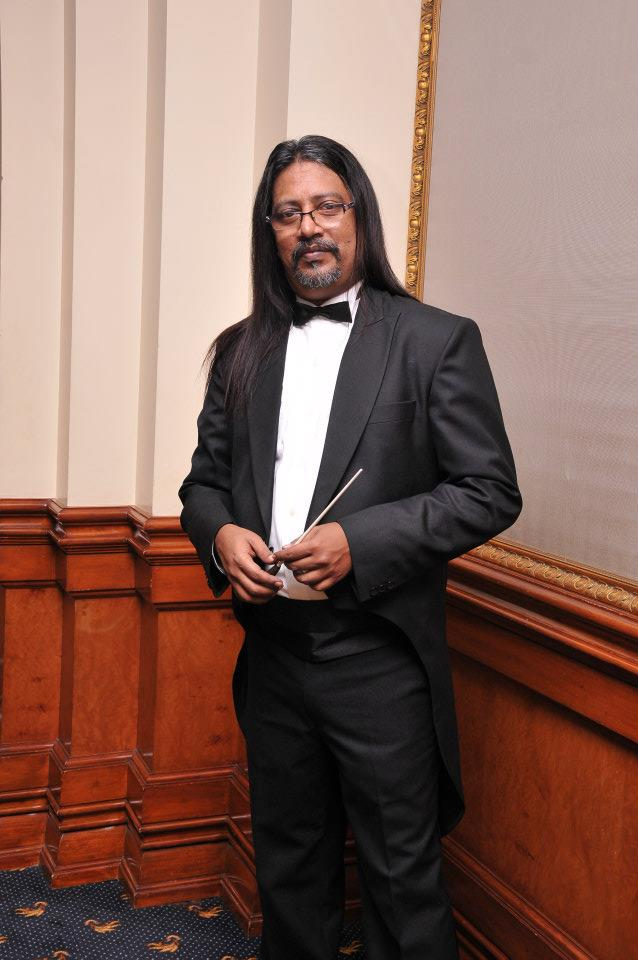
- Williams in 2012

Background information
- Born: Ashley William Joseph; October 3, 1965 (age 60)
- Origin: Bangalore, Karnataka, India
- Genres: Contemporary instrumental, instrumental, crossover, new-age
- Occupation(s): Composer, pianist, music producer, educator, philanthropist, orchestra conductor
- Instrument(s): Piano, keyboards, conducting
- Years active: 1980–present
- Website: williamjoseph.org

Ashley William Joseph (born October 3, 1965) is an Indian composer. He serves as the chair of the William Joseph Music Foundation, an organization that promotes music education and appreciation. He is the director and conductor of the Bangalore Musical Association.

== Early life and education ==
Joseph was born on October 3, 1965, in Bangalore, Karnataka, to Joseph Thomas Williams and Sarah William Joseph. His father was pipe organist at St. Andrew's Church in Bangalore and head of the music department at Baldwin Boys High School. Joseph attended the Baldwin Boys High School in Bangalore.

== Career ==
Joseph founded the William Joseph Music Foundation for Performing Arts, a non-profit organization that caters to the education, performance, and promotion of dance, music, and drama to underprivileged children and adolescents from India.

Actress Deepika Padukone was trained by Joseph.

== Awards ==
In 2008, Joseph was honored by the Chief Minister of Karnataka, Bookanakere Siddalingappa Yediyurappa for his contributions to music and music education.

The YMCA of Singapore and the International Y Men's Club of Singapore, in a joint project aiding Thailand flood victims, honored Joseph for his performance as guest conductor with the Thailand Sanctuary Symphony Orchestra.
