= Donald Foster Hudson =

British missionary to India (1916 - 2003)

- Born: 29 April 1916; Halifax, West Riding of Yorkshire, England
- Died: 5 June 2003 (aged 87); England
- Other names: D. F. Hudson
- Education: Regent's Park College, Oxford, Oxford University, M.A.
- Church: BMS World Mission
- Ordained: 6 July 1940
- Writings: See Section
- Congregations served: West Bradford Baptist Fellowship and the Central Bradford Baptist Fellowship.
- Offices held: Lecturer of New Testament, Serampore College, Serampore
- Title: Reverend Doctor

Donald Foster Hudson (1916–2003) was a British missionary in India and the author of Teach Yourself New Testament Greek.

== History ==
Hudson was born in Halifax, West Riding of Yorkshire, England on 29 April 1916 to John and Kate. He was enlisted for overseas missionary work with the BMS World Mission and was sent for theological studies to the Regent's Park College, Oxford. He became ordained as a Baptist minister on 6 July 1940 and sailed for India the same year.

Hudson first served as a Missionary in Burma and later became Lecturer in New Testament at Serampore College (the only constituent College of the Senate of Serampore College}) from 1941 to 1964 along with M. P. John, his colleague who joined the college in 1947. Hudson and John tutored K. David, then pursuing postgraduate studies in Serampore College.

In 1964 Hudson left India and was involved in pastoral roles in England among the Baptist fraternity. In 1997 he received Maundy money from Queen Elizabeth II in Bradford Cathedral, West Yorkshire, England. He was a member of the Society for Biblical Studies in India.

== Writings ==
Books

- Teach Yourself New Testament Greek
- Teach Yourself Bengali
- The Life and Letters of Saint Paul

Articles

- Diakonia and its Cognates in the New Testament
- A Further Note on Philippians 2:6-11

Professional and academic associations
Preceded by M. P. John	President; Society for Biblical Studies in India; 1966 - 1968	Succeeded by Rene Van de Walle
Religious titles
Preceded by -	President, Yorkshire Baptist Association, Leeds; 1984	Succeeded by -
