= Mathew P. John =

- Other name: M. P. John
- Writings: Life, Death and Life after Death; The Changing Pattern of Family in India; Bible Translation and Mission: Review Essay; New Perceptions in the Mission of the Church: New Frontiers, New Challenges
- Title: Reverend Doctor

Mathew P. John was a Biblical Scholar and President of the Society for Biblical Studies in India.

== Studies ==
M. P. John studied Bachelor of Divinity from 1943 to 1949 at Serampore College, Serampore during the Principalship of G. H. C. Angus.

== Career ==
From 1947 to 1971 he was lecturer of New Testament at Serampore College, Serampore,. where he once studied. He later undertook doctoral studies in Chicago in New Testament between 1960 and 1963 and returned to Serampore to take up his teaching assignments. However, it was not until 1969 that he could complete his doctoral studies. M. P. John became the Rector of Serampore College in 1964, a position in which he continued until he left the college in January 1971 and joined the Translations Department of the Bible Society of India and oversaw the common language translations in Shillong, Meghalaya.

After M. P. John's stint with the Bible Society of India, he joined the Bishop's College, Kolkata and became its Principal.

Professional and academic associations
Preceded by R. M. Clark	President; Society for Biblical Studies in India; 1964–1966	Succeeded by D. F. Hudson
Academic offices
Preceded by D. F. Hudson	Lecturer of New Testament; Serampore College, Serampore; 1947–1971	Succeeded by K. Devasahayam
Preceded by	Principal; Bishop's College, Kolkata; 1989	Succeeded by Somen Das
Educational offices
Preceded by	Rector; Serampore College, Serampore; 1964–1971	Succeeded by K. Devasahayam
Other offices
Preceded by C. Arangaden; 1960–1981	Associate General Secretary, (Translations), Bible Society of India, Bangalore; 1981–1984	Succeeded by John Philipose; 1984–1991
