= Nitoy Achümi =

Nitoy K. Achümi
- Born: 1935; Nagaland
- Died: 20 August 2005 (aged 69–70)
- Occupation: Translator

Ecclesiastical career
- Church: First Baptist Church, Zunheboto
- Writings: 1987, The translation of 'nephesh' in the Sema Naga Bible, 1992, Translation of 'God' and 'Lord' in Some Naga Bibles,
- Title: The Reverend

N. K. Achümi was a Bible Translator who was Translations Advisor with the United Bible Societies and was based in Nagaland.

As a Linguist, Achümi was involved in the translation and revision of the Bible into Naga languages. When the Bible in Pochuri language was released in 2014, Achümi's contribution towards the translation was acknowledged.

== Writings ==
- 1987, The translation of 'nephesh' in the Sema Naga Bible,
- 1992, Translation of 'God' and 'Lord' in Some Naga Bibles
- 1995, In search of a common language for Nagas

== Education ==
Achümi studied Old Testament under E. C. John, G. M. Butterworth and Gerhard Wehmeier at the United Theological College, Bangalore between 1972 and 1975 during the Principalship of Joshua Russell Chandran. Achümi's companions included Basil Rebera, A. P. Chacko, G. Babu Rao, S. J. Theodore and Timotheas Hembrom, all of whom studied under E. C. John, a direct student of the master-specialist of Old Testament, Gerhard von Rad. In the ensuing convocation of the Senate of Serampore College (University), Achümi was awarded an M. Th. degree by then Registrar, C. Devasahayam.

== Family ==
Nitoy and his wife, Vishi, had four children, two sons and two daughters. Vishli personally typed all of his manuscripts. His daughter, Bernika, is married to theologian, pastor and Inter Varsity Press author Donald C. Simmons, Jr. Achümi is buried in Thilixü Village, near Dimapur.
