= The Bible Translator =

- Discipline: Translation
- Language: English
- Edited by: Marijke de Lang (Executive Editor), Andy Warren-Rothlin (Associate Editor), Jeff Green (Managing Editor)

Publication details
- History: 1950-present
- Publisher: SAGE Publications in association with the United Bible Societies
- Frequency: Triannual

Standard abbreviations
- ISO 4: Bible Transl.

Indexing
- ISSN: 2051-6770

Links
- Journal homepage

The Bible Translator is a peer-reviewed academic journal relating to theory and practice of Bible translation.

"The Bible Translator is the leading academic journal dedicated to the theory and practice of Bible translation. It has been published continuously since 1950, and exists firstly to serve those directly involved in Bible translation, aiming to encourage sharing of the results of their research and records of their practice. It exists also to provide a forum for a wider community of scholars and students interested in a range of disciplines which influence the translation of the Bible, and encourages engagement between scholars and translators."

From its foundation in 1950, TBT appeared in two series - Technical Papers in January and July, and Practical Papers in April and October. Since April 2013, Technical and Practical Papers have appeared together in a single volume, which appears three times a year.

The Bible Translator is a member of the Committee on Publication Ethics

== Abstracting and indexing ==
The journal is abstracted and indexed in:

- Linguistics and Language Behavior Abstracts
- ATLA Religion Database
- Emerging Sources Citation Index

== See also ==
- List of theology journals
