= Chrysostom Arangaden =

Indian Bible scholar

The Reverend Chrysostom Arangaden CSI
- Born: 1916
- Died: May 2004
- Education: United Theological College; Serampore (B.D.); Malabar Christian College; Princeton Theological Seminary (Th.M.); Drew University (M.A.)
- Occupations: Old Testament Teacher, Ecclesiastical Administrator and Translations Scholar
- Years active: 1944-1981

Ecclesiastical career
- Religion: Christianity
- Church: Church of South India
- Writings: see section
- Offices held: Teacher of Old Testament, Kerala United Theological Seminary, Trivandrum, (1944-1947), Director, Christian Institute for the Study of Religion and Society, Bangalore, (1952-1957), Associate General Secretary, National Missionary Society, Chennai (1957-1960), Associate General Secretary (Translation's), Bible Society of India, Bangalore (1974-1988)
- Title: The Reverend

Chrysostom Arangaden (1916—2004) was an Old Testament scholar and a member of the Society for Biblical Studies, India. Arangaden was notable for his contribution as Associate General Secretary (Translation's) of the Bible Society of India.

Arangaden was an active administrator of the National Missionary Society of India and became Honorary Treasurer of the Society in 1949.

In 1960, Arangaden served as Distribution Promoter of the Bible Society of India for a short tenure and was also in charge of the Tamil Nadu Auxiliary of the Bible Society of India

== Writings ==
- 1947, Christian leadership: A new emphasis,
- 1967, The New Testament in recent Scholarship,
- 1985, With the Word at hand,
- 1992 (with John Philipose), Carey's legacy of Bible translation

== Studies ==
Arangaden studied at the United Theological College, Bangalore during 1940-1944 during the Principalship of M. H. Harrison for spiritual studies leading to B.D. under the Senate of Serampore College (University). For postgraduate studies, Arangaden studied at the Princeton Theological Seminary, New Jersey where he took a Th.M.

Arangaden continued his studies at New Jersey enrolling for a Master of Arts programme in Sociology with Drew University.

Academic offices
Preceded by	Professor of Old Testament, Kerala United Theological Seminary, Trivandrum; 1944-1947	Succeeded by
Educational offices
Preceded by Post created	Director, Christian Institute for the Study of Religion and Society, Bangalore; 1952-1957	Succeeded by P. D. Devanandan; 1957-1962
Other offices
Preceded by	Associate General Secretary, National Missionary Society, Chennai; 1957-1960	Succeeded by
Preceded by Post created	Associate General Secretary (Translations), Bible Society of India, Bangalore; 1960-1981	Succeeded by M. P. John; 1981-1984
