= United Bible Societies =

Organization

United Bible Societies (UBS)
- Founded: 1946
- Type: International charity association
- Region served: World
- Website: unitedbiblesocieties.org

The United Bible Societies (UBS) is a global fellowship of around 150 Bible societies operating in more than 240 countries and territories. It has working hubs in England, Singapore and Nairobi. The headquarters are located in Swindon, England.

== History ==
The organization was founded in 1948 with representatives from national Biblical societies. In 2008, it had 100 member societies. In 2013, it had 145 member societies in more than 200 countries. In 2019, it had translated the entire Bible with her partners in 694 languages.

== Members ==
As of 2024, United Bible Societies is a Fellowship of 150 Bible Societies working in more than 240 countries and territories.

== Mission ==
The mission of United Bible Societies is to make the Bible available and accessible to everyone who wants it, and to help people engage with its message in meaningful and relevant ways.

Bible societies are also active in areas such as HIV/AIDS prevention, trauma healing and literacy. Bible societies carry out their work in partnership with all Christian Churches and many international non-governmental organisations. It has an observer status with the World Council of Churches and collaborates with the Catholic Biblical Federation as well as with several church organisations.

== Paratext ==
UBS developed Paratext, the most important and widely used software for Bible translation. It performs many functions unique to the Bible translation task, and to the process of translating into a language whose writing system is still being developed. The text editor is indexed to the Biblical texts enabling powerful searching and checking from the very beginning of a translation effort. Paratext has many other cutting-edge features including collaboration tools that allow for translators to work from many different locations. Paratext is also integrated with the Digital Bible Library which allows for easy archiving and publishing of biblical texts. Paratext is currently being jointly maintained and developed with SIL Global.

== Magazine ==
The Bible Translator is a refereed journal, published since 1950, dedicated to articles about the theory and practice of Bible translation. It appears in two series – Technical Papers in January and July, and Practical Papers in April and October.

== See also ==
- Hebrew Old Testament Text Project
