= Vadapalli Prasada Rao =

Indian bishop (1954–2020)

Bishop V. Prasada Rao, CSI Ayyagaru
- The Right Reverend
- Church: Church of South India (A Uniting church comprising Wesleyan Methodist, Congregational, Presbyterian and Anglican missionary societies – ABCFM, SPG, WMMS, LMS, Basel Mission, CMS, and the Church of England)
- Diocese: Dornakal
- In office: 2012
- Predecessor: B. S. Devamani, CSI
- Successor: K. Padma Rao, CSI

Orders
- Ordination: 29.6.1982 as Deacon, 29.6.1984 as Pastor by G. S. Luke, CSI
- Consecration: 12 June 2012 at CSI-Epiphany Cathedral, Dornakal by G. Devakadasham, Moderator, Church of South India Synod and G. Dyvasirvadam, Deputy Moderator, Church of South India Synod
- Rank: Bishop

Personal details
- Born: Vadapalli Prasada Rao; 1 December 1954 Kistaram, Sattupalli Mandal, Khammam District
- Died: 7 September 2020 (aged 65) Dornakal
- Buried: Epiphany Cathedral compound, Dornakal
- Denomination: Christianity
- Profession: Priest
- Education: B. Sc. (Kakatiya); B. D. (Serampore)
- Alma mater: Degree College, Ramavaram, Andhra Christian Theological College, Secunderabad

V. Prasada Rao (1 December 1954 – 7 September 2020) was the eighth Bishop - in - Dornakal Diocese of the Church of South India who was principally consecrated on 12 June 2012 by then Moderator, G. Devakadasham and co-consecrated by then Deputy Moderator, G. Dyvasirvadam of the Church of South India Synod at the CSI-Epiphany Cathedral, Dornakal. During the Synod of 2017, Prasada Rao also served as the Deputy Moderator of the Synod for the triennium 2017–2019.

== Studies ==
After schooling in Kistaram and collegiate studies in Sathupalli, Prasada Rao studied sciences leading to Bachelor of Science degree at Ramavaram after which he worked at the Singareni Collieries Company. Much like the early Church Father Saint Ambrose of Milan, Prasada Rao relinquished civil work and took to priesthood and joined the Andhra Christian Theological College, Hyderabad in 1979 during the period of the Old Testament Scholars Victor Premasagar, CSI and G. Babu Rao, CBCNC. The Andhra Christian Theological College where Prasada Rao studied is affiliated with the Senate of Serampore College (University), India's first {a university under Section 2 (f) of the University Grants Commission Act, 1956} with degree-granting authority validated by a Danish Charter and ratified by the Government of West Bengal. Prasada Rao was awarded a degree by the university during the Registrarship of the New Testament Scholar, D. S. Satyaranjan.

== Ministry and Bishopric ==
Ever since his ordination as a Deacon on 29 June 1982 and later as a Pastor on 29 June 1984 by then Bishop G. S. Luke, Prasada Rao began ministering parishes in the Diocese of Dornakal. After nearly thirty years of pastoral ministry, Prasada Rao contested the bishopric during the sede vacante caused on the retirement of his predecessor B. S. Devamani. As the congregations in the Diocese of Dornakal were eagerly awaiting the declaration of the results by the Church of South India Synod, the Moderator, G. Devakadasham advised the congregations to seek holy guidance by observing prayer day on 5 June 2012 following which the Moderator announced the name of Prasada Rao as the eighth Bishop-in-Dornakal.

On 12 June 2012, Prasada Rao was principally consecrated at the CSI-Epiphany Cathedral, Dornakal by the Moderator, G. Devakadasham and co-consecrated by the Deputy Moderator, G. Dyvasirvadam in the presence of other Bishops, P. Surya Prakash and the other two living patriarchs of the Diocese of Dornakal, A. Rajarathnam and B. S. Devamani. The consecration mass of the new Bishop was witnessed by nearly 8,000 people who thronged the Cathedral premises in Dornakal on Tuesday, 12 June 2012.

Religious titles
Preceded by B. S. Devamani, CSI; 2006-2012	Church of South India, Bishop - in - Dornakal, Dornakal; 2012-2020	Succeeded by K. Padma Rao, CSI; 2021-present
Preceded by Thomas K. Oommen, CSI; 2014-2017	Deputy Moderator, Church of South India Synod, Chennai; 2017-2019	Succeeded by K. Reuben Mark, CSI; 2020-2023
Honorary titles
Preceded by B. S. Devamani, CSI; 2006-2012	Member, Board of Governors, Andhra Christian Theological College; Hyderabad; 2012-2020	Succeeded by K. Padma Rao, CSI; 2021-present
