= S. S. Subbayya =

Indian Anglican archdeacon in the Diocese of Dornakal (died 1944)

Rev. S. S. Subbayya
- Archdeacon of Dornakal
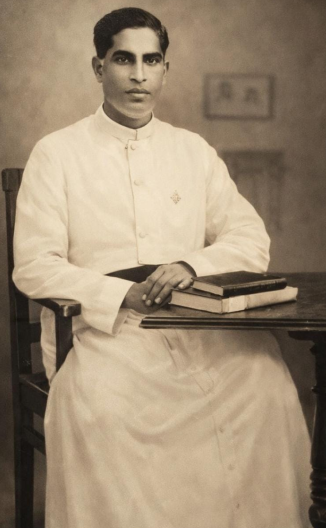
- Rev. S. S. Subbayya, Archdeacon of Dornakal (1930–1944)
- Native name: సరెళ్ళ సమూయేలు సుబ్బయ్య
- Church: Anglican Communion
- Diocese: Diocese of Dornakal
- Appointed: Diocesan Missioner: 1925; Archdeacon: 1930

Orders
- Ordination: Deacon: 1923; Priest: 1924

Personal details
- Died: 13 September 1944 Dornakal, Hyderabad State, British India
- Occupation: Archdeacon; Diocesan Missioner

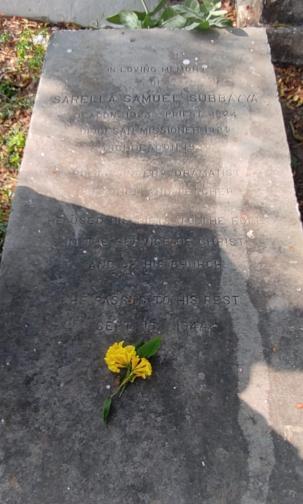
Grave of Rev. S. S. Subbayya, Dornakal Cathedral compound

Sarella Samooyelu Subbaiah (Telugu: సరెళ్ళ సమూయేలు సుబ్బయ్య; died 13 September 1944), known in diocesan records as Rev. S. S. Subbayya, was an Anglican priest who served in the Diocese of Dornakal in what is now Andhra Pradesh. He was ordained deacon in 1923 and appointed Archdeacon of Dornakal in 1930 — believed to be the first Indian clergyman to hold that office — serving under Bishop V. S. Azariah until his death in 1944. His birth date and early family background have not been established from the sources.

== Early life ==
Subbayya's early life is poorly documented. Basil Mathews records that as a young man he attended evangelistic meetings held by V. S. Azariah and the American YMCA figure Sherwood Eddy, without specifying when or where. The Diocese of Dornakal had been constituted in December 1912, taking in mission territories previously run by the Church Missionary Society and the Society for the Propagation of the Gospel. Azariah, its first bishop, brought Indian clergy into senior roles throughout the interwar period. He was ordained deacon in 1923 and priest in 1924.

== Ministry ==
=== Diocesan Missioner ===
Subbayya was appointed Diocesan Missioner in 1925, coordinating clergy, catechists and teachers across the rural Godavari districts. Eyre Chatterton's 1924 survey of Anglican mission work in India notes social programmes in the area, including lace-making schemes for women.

=== Archdeacon of Dornakal ===
In 1930 Subbayya was appointed Archdeacon of Dornakal, a post he held until his death in 1944. Harper (2000) discusses the appointment in the context of Azariah's policy of appointing Indian clergy to senior diocesan positions.

== Writings ==
In 1937 Subbayya published History of Dummagudem (Dornakal: Mission Press), recording the growth of Christian mission in that region. He also composed Telugu Christian hymns drawing on pada and keertana poetic forms; Mathews (1938) names one, "Sarva Dēśamu Lārā" (సర్వ దేశము లారా). Mathews also records that he wrote dramatic works for evangelistic use, including plays on the prophet Amos and the Queen of Sheba, and compiled a manual in Telugu for village preachers.

== Death ==
Subbayya died on 13 September 1944 at Dornakal and was buried in the Dornakal Cathedral compound. The inscription on his gravestone reads: "poet, singer, dramatist, preacher and teacher who used his gifts to the full in the service of Christ and of his church." (Note: Gravestone inscription, Dornakal Cathedral compound, Telangana. Photograph on Wikimedia Commons.)

== Works ==
- History of Dummagudem. Dornakal: Mission Press, 1937.
- Telugu Christian hymns including "Sarva Dēśamu Lārā".
- Dramatic works on Amos and the Queen of Sheba.
