= T. B. D. Prakasa Rao =

Indian bishop

Bishop T. B. D. Prakasa Rao, CSI Ayyagaru
- Bishop -in - CSI-Krishna-Godavari Diocese
- Church: Church of South India (A Uniting church comprising Wesleyan Methodist, Congregational, Calvinist, Presbyterian and Anglican missionary societies – ABCFM, Dutch Reformed Church, SPG, WMMS, LMS, Basel Mission, CMS, and the Church of England)
- Diocese: CSI-Krishna-Godavari Diocese
- See: CSI-St. Paul's Centenary Church, Vijayawada (since 2001, the Cathedra of the Bishop has been shifted to St. Andrew's Cathedral, Machilipatnam)
- Elected: 1981
- In office: 1981–2001
- Predecessor: N. D. Ananda Rao Samuel, CSI
- Successor: G. Dyvasirvadam, CSI
- Previous posts: Auxiliary Secretary, Bible Society of India Andhra Pradesh Auxiliary, Bible House, Secunderabad (relocated in Guntur in 2016)(1976-1981)

Orders
- Ordination: by Andhra Evangelical Lutheran Church Society
- Consecration: 18 November 1981 by Moderator Solomon Doraiswamy, CSI (Principal Consecrator) and Deputy Moderator I. Jesudason, CSI (Co-consecrator)
- Rank: Bishop

Personal details
- Born: Thumaty Babu Deva Prakasa Rao; 17 December 1939 Andhra Pradesh, India
- Died: 30 May 2018 (aged 78) Hyderabad, Telangana, India
- Buried: CSI-Garrison Wesley Church Cemetery No. 12, Karkhana
- Denomination: Christianity
- Parents: The Rev. T. Joseph, AELC
- Occupation: Anglican priest
- Education: B.A. (Andhra), B. D. (Serampore), M. A. (Osmania), B. Ed. (Andhra)
- Alma mater: Andhra-Christian College, Guntur (Andhra Pradesh), Gurukul Lutheran Theological College, Chennai (Tamil Nadu), Osmania University, Hyderabad (Telangana), Government Training College, Rajahmundry (Andhra Pradesh)

Bishop T. B. D. Prakasa Rao (born 17 December 1939; died 30 May 2018) was the fourth CSI-Bishop - in - Krishna-Godavari of the Protestant Church of South India who occupied the Cathedra placed at CSI-St. Paul's Cathedral, Vijayawada. The Bishopric of Prakasa Rao lasted for two decades from 1981 through 2001, one of the longest in the history of the Church of South India Society. Prakasa Rao led the bishopric of Krishna-Godavari that comprised the Christian missions established by the London Missionary Society (LMS) and the Church Missionary Society (CMS) which merged its South India Christian missions in India into the Church of South India Society which was inaugurated in 1947 at the CSI-St. George's Cathedral, Madras.

Prakasa Rao earlier led the Bible Society of India Andhra Pradesh Auxiliary from 1976 through 1981 especially during the period when common language translations into vernacular languages were being undertaken by the Bible Society of India throughout the country from the original sources comprising the Biblia Hebraica Stuttgartensia and the Novum Testamentum Graece under the direction of The Rev. C. Arangaden through its translation team comprising Old Testament Scholars well-versed in Biblical Aramaic and Biblical Hebrew and New Testament Scholars with expertise in Biblical Greek comprising M. P. John, John Philipose, G. Babu Rao, Basil Rebera, and Nitoy Achümi. During Rao's stint with the Auxiliary, common language translation of the scriptures into modern Telugu language were already being undertaken by G. Babu Rao together with his graduate companion S. Israel.

On Wednesday, 30 May 2018, Prakasa Rao died while at his quarter in Bandlaguda Jagir and his funeral mass was held on Friday, 1 June 2018 led by the present Bishop - in - Krishna Godavari, The Right Reverend T. George Cornelious and other clergy hailing from both the Diocese of Medak and the Diocese of Krishna Godavari at the CSI-Garrison Wesley Church Cemetery at Karkhana, Secunderabad. Later, the same evening, a well-attended Memorial Thanksgiving was held at his erstwhile quarter at Bandlaguda Jagir led by The Rev. U. Daniel, CSI, Ministerial Secretary of the Medak Diocese, where the Church Historian B. C. Paul, AELC and others reminisced about their association with and the contribution of Prakasa Rao to the ministries of the Church.

== Studies ==
=== General studies ===
==== Andhra Pradesh ====
After schooling and collegiate studies, Prakasa Rao enrolled at the AELC-Andhra Christian College, Guntur during the Principalship of Rao Sahab T. S. Paulus where he studied for a degree in B.A. specializing in English literature which was later awarded by the Andhra University, Visakhapatnam.

Rao also studied for a graduate degree in education at the Government Training College, Rajahmundry where he was awarded a B.Ed. degree by the Andhra University after completion of his studies.

==== Telangana ====
During the academic year 1963–1964, Rao enrolled at the State-run Osmania University, Hyderabad for a postgraduate programme in M.A. specializing in Philosophy.

=== Spiritual studies ===
In 1959, after graduate studies leading to B.A., Prakasa Rao discerned his avocation towards priesthood and chose to become a priest and enrolled as a ministerial candidate of the Protestant Andhra Evangelical Lutheran Church Society, under the incumbency of President G. Devasahayam, which then sent him to a seminary in Chennai for studies in spirituality. Prakasa Rao enrolled at the Gurukul Lutheran Theological College, Chennai affiliated to India's first University, the Senate of Serampore College (University) {a University under Section 2 (f) of the University Grants Commission Act, 1956}with degree-granting authority validated by a Danish Charter and ratified by the Government of West Bengal where he underwent ministerial formation in spirituality under notable faculty comprising The Rev. Sigfrid Estborn, who was teaching Ecumenism, The Rev. P. David teaching Religions, and The Rev. R. A. Martin who was teaching Greek language and the New Testament. Prakasa Rao's companions at the seminary included G. D. Melanchton, AELC, M. Victor Paul, AELC, de:Johnson Gnanabaranam, TELC, Kambar Manickam, TELC and others. After the three-year course in spirituality, Rao was awarded a Bachelor of Divinity degree by the Senate of Serampore College (University) in the ensuing convocation of 1963 led by its Registrar, C. Devasahayam, CBCNC.

== Ecclesiastical ministry ==
=== Pastoral ===
==== Lutheran ====
After returning from Chennai, Rao began pastoring parishes within the ecclesiastical jurisdiction of the Andhra Evangelical Lutheran Church Society. It was during this period that he privately tutored The Reverend Sister B. V. Subbamma, then Principal of the Charlotte Swenson Memorial Bible Training School in Rajahmundry who had enrolled at the Andhra Christian Theological College, then located in Rajahmundry for graduate studies in Bachelor of Divinity.

After a period of ecclesiastical ministry, Prakasa Rao expressed his views on Anglicanism to the Andhra Evangelical Lutheran Church Society led by President K. Devasahayam who willingly excardinated Rao from the Society enabling his incardination into the Church of South India by the Moderator N. D. Ananda Rao Samuel.

==== Anglican ====
Upon the incardination of Rao into the Church of South India, he was assigned the ecclesiastical jurisdiction of Krishna-Godavari Diocese where he began pastoring parishes falling under the purview of the diocese from Visakhapatnam district through Guntur district.

=== Fully-ecumenical ===
The Bible Society of India Andhra Pradesh Auxiliary is one of the Auxiliaries of the Bible Society of India headquartered in Bangalore and works for the cause of the Bible in an ecumenical environment with the Roman Catholics, the Orthodox and the Protestants. In 1976, Prakasa Rao was appointed as the Auxiliary Secretary of the BSI Andhra Pradesh Auxiliary by the rural Pastor A. E. Inbanathan, then General Secretary of the Bible Society of India who had much understanding of the Church in India and more so with fellow clergy. Subsequently, the Krishna-Godavari Diocese of the Church of South India led by N. D. Ananda Rao Samuel loaned the services of Prakasa Rao to the Bible Society of India enabling Rao to take up the ecumenical work at the Auxiliary which was led by notable predecessors beginning with E. Prakasam, AELC, A. B. Masilamani, CBCNC and B. G. Prasada Rao, CSI. During his administrative stint with the Bible Society of India Andhra Pradesh Auxiliary, Prakasa Rao resided in the Bible House, a prominent landmark in Secunderabad.

After a six-year ecumenical ministry which began in 1976, Prakasa Rao was recalled in 1981 by the Church of South India to resume his ecclesiastical ministry. Rao was succeeded as Auxiliary Secretary by L. Prakasam of the Convention of Baptist Churches of Northern Circars.

=== Bishopric ===
==== Election and Appointment ====
The Krishna-Godavari Diocese of the Church of South India was formed in 1947, the very year of the formation of the Church of South India at the St. George's Cathedral, Chennai. The diocese was led by pioneer Bishops Y. Muthyalu, A. B. Eliott and N. D. Ananda Rao Samuel.

Prakasa Rao was incardinated into the Church of South India during the Bishopric of N. D. Ananda Rao Samuel who occupied the Cathedra at Eluru from 1961 to 1978. Due to an ecclesiastical event that took place in 1978, the Krishna-Godavari Diocese came under the purview of the Church of South India Synod led by Deputy Moderator Solomon Doraiswamy who oversaw the administration of the Diocese through clergy consisting of H. D. L. Abraham followed by Victor Premasagar to perform the ecclesiastical responsibilities in the diocese.

During the seventeenth Church of South India Synod held at Chennai in 1980, the Synod elected Solomon Doraiswamy and I. Jesudason as the Moderator and Deputy Moderator for the biennium 1980–1982. It was during this period that the Church of South India Synod pursued the ecclesiastical matters in the Krishna-Godavari Diocese leading to the election of T. B. D. Prakasa Rao as the fourth CSI-Bishop - in - Krishna-Godavari.

Rao was consecrated on 18 November 1981 at the CSI-St. Paul's Centenary Church, Vijayawada by Solomon Doraiswamy and I. Jesudason in the presence of other clergy consisting of Victor Premasagar, the General Secretary of the Church of South India. Rao led the Diocese from Vijayawada throughout his bishopric from 1981 through 2001.

==== The two-decades of bishopric ====
In matters of ecclesiastical administration, Prakasa Rao involved Sociologists for the Clergy retreats as early as 1995 itself. It was Prakasa Rao who dedicated the J. Sikile School in 1984 at Narsapur.

In 1992, Prakasa Rao took part in the consecration of the Old Testament Scholar, S. John Theodore as the fourth Bishop - in - Karimnagar held at the CSI-Wesley Cathedral in Karimnagar in the presence of Moderator Bird Ryder Devapriam and Deputy Moderator Jason Dharmaraj, Bishop Victor Premasagar, Bishops Emeriti Bobbili Prabhudass, Gone B. Devasahayam, and Kalepalli E. Swamidass and other clergy. In 2000, Prakasa Rao led the Diocese in its Mission Festival in Vijayawada in the presence of the Old Testament Scholar Victor Premasagar and the Systematic theologian G. Dyvasirvadam.

After nearly two decades of Bishopric, Rao sought voluntary retirement and vacated the Cathedra in 2001 leading to sede vacante following which the Church of South India Synod huddled and conducted elections resulting in the unanimous election and appointment of the Systematic theologian G. Dyvasirvadam as G. D. V. Prasad, a companion of Dyvasirvadam, refrained from contesting in order to facilitate G. Dyvasirvadam to be appointed as Bishop setting an unparalleled precedent.

==== Decennial Lambeth Conferences ====
As a bishop of the Church of South India, part of the Anglican Consultative Council, Rao was entitled to attend the decennial Lambeth Conferences presided by the Archbishop of Canterbury. During the bishopric of Rao from 1981 through 2001 as Bishop - in - Krishna-Godavari Diocese, he had attended the twelfth and the thirteenth Lambeth Conferences in 1988 and 1998 presided by Robert Runcie and George Carey respectively.

==== Biennial Synods ====
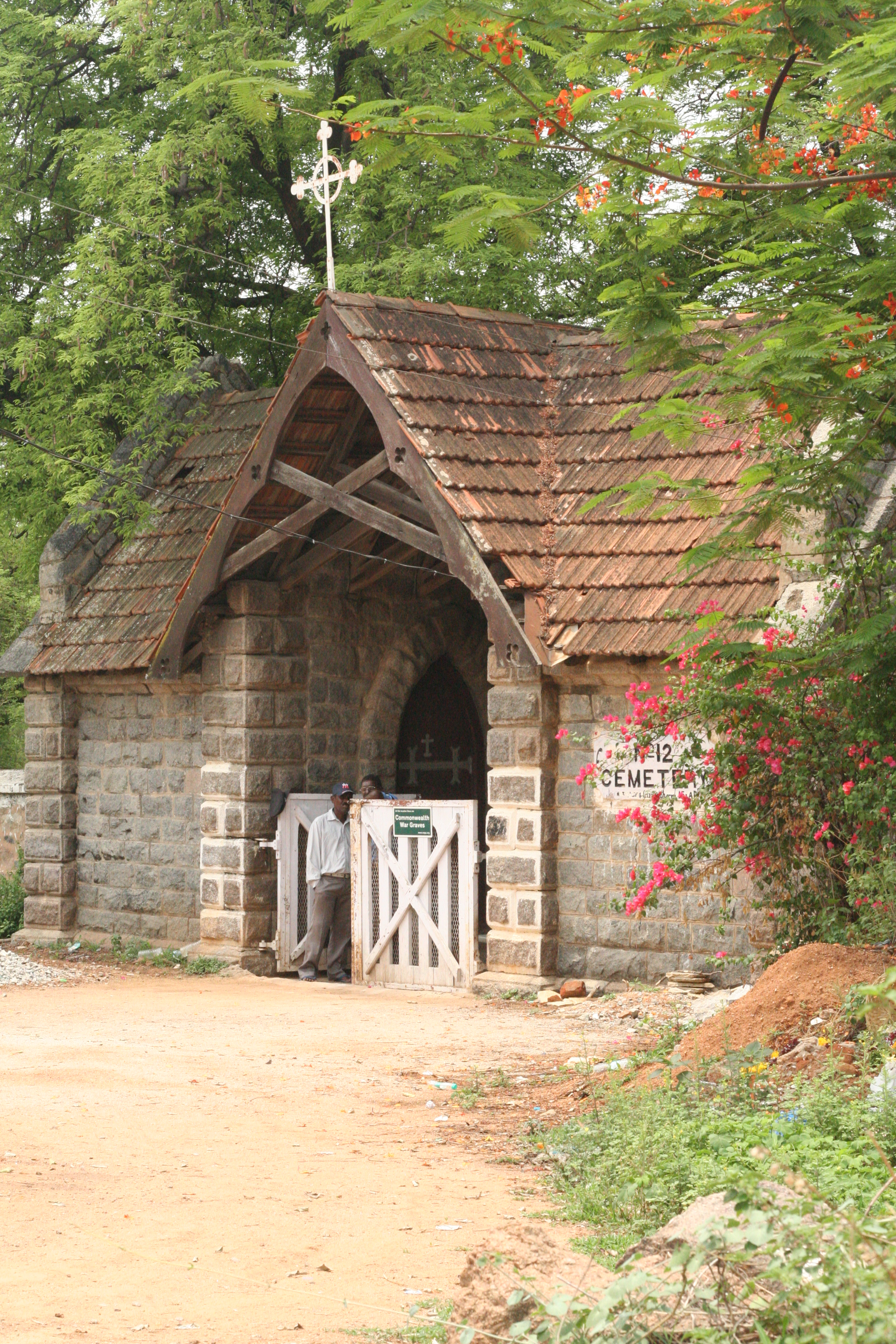
CSI-Garrison Wesley Church Cemetery No. 12 in Karkhana where Prakasa Rao has been entombed in Secunderabad Cantonment.

During the Bishopric of Rao from 1981 through 2001, he had attended nearly ten biennial synods of the Church of South India Synod crisscrossing the geography of South India,

- XVIII session of the Synod of 1982 hosted by the Diocese of Vellore at Vellore
  - which elected I. Jesudason and Sundar Clarke as the Moderator and Deputy Moderator respectively
- XIX session of the Synod of 1984 hosted by the Diocese of Medak at Secunderabad
  - reelecting I. Jesudason and Sundar Clarke as the Moderator and Deputy Moderator respectively
- XX session of the Synod of 1986 hosted by the South Kerala Diocese at Trivandrum
  - which again reelected I. Jesudason as Moderator and P. Victor Premasagar as the Deputy Moderator,
- XXI session of the Synod of 1988 hosted by the Madurai-Ramnad Diocese at Madurai
  - electing P. Victor Premasagar as the Moderator and The Right Rev. D. Pothirajulu Deputy Moderator
- XXII session of the Synod of 1990 hosted by the Karnataka North at Dharwad
  - reelecting P. Victor Premasagar as Moderator and Vasant P. Dandin as the Deputy Moderator
- XXIII session of the Synod of 1992 hosted by the Tirunelveli Diocese at Palayamkottai
  - electing The Most Rev. B. Ryder Devapriyam and Jason S. Dharmaraj as the Moderator and Deputy Moderator respectively
- XXIV session of the Synod of 1994 hosted by the Trichy-Tanjore Diocese at Trichy
  - electing Vasant P. Dandin and R. Paul Raj as the Moderator and Deputy Moderator respectively
- XXV session of the Synod of 1996 hosted by the Diocese of Coimbatore at Coimbatore
  - reelecting Vasant P. Dandin as Moderator and William Moses as Deputy Moderator
- XXVI session of the Synod of 1998 hosted by the Diocese of Rayalaseema at Madanapalle
  - electing William Moses and K. J. Samuel as the Moderator and Deputy Moderator respectively
- XXVII session of the Synod of 2000 hosted by the Diocese of Medak at Secunderabad
  - electing K. J. Samuel and B. P. Sugandhar as the Moderator and Deputy Moderator respectively

=== Governor ===
During the Bishopric of Prakasa Rao from 1981 to 2001, he was ex officio member of the Board of Governors representing the Krishna-Godavari Diocese at the near-ecumenical Andhra Christian Theological College, Hyderabad comprising the Church of South India (Anglicans, Congregationalists, Wesleyans), Baptists, Lutherans, and the Methodists. Prakasa Rao's term as Governor began during the principalship of K. David, CBCNC and continued for over two decades during the ensuing terms of Suppogu Joseph, STBC, M. Victor Paul, AELC, R. Yesurathnam, CSI, and K. D. G. Prakasa Rao, CBCNC. As Governor of the college, Prakasa Rao provided the required management skills enabling the administration of the Seminary making it a notable institution under the Senate of Serampore College (University). Incidentally, the Systematic theologian G. Dyvasirvadam, also hailing from the Krishna-Godavari Diocese was a member of the Faculty of the college coinciding with the Governorship of Rao.

During the academic year 1995–1996, Prakasa Rao was elected as chairperson of the Board of Governors of the college during the Principalship of the Systematic theologian The Rev. R. Yesurathnam, CSI. After two decades of governorship at the college, Rao resigned from the Board of Governors in 2001 due to his voluntary retirement from the Church of South India.

== Honours and death ==
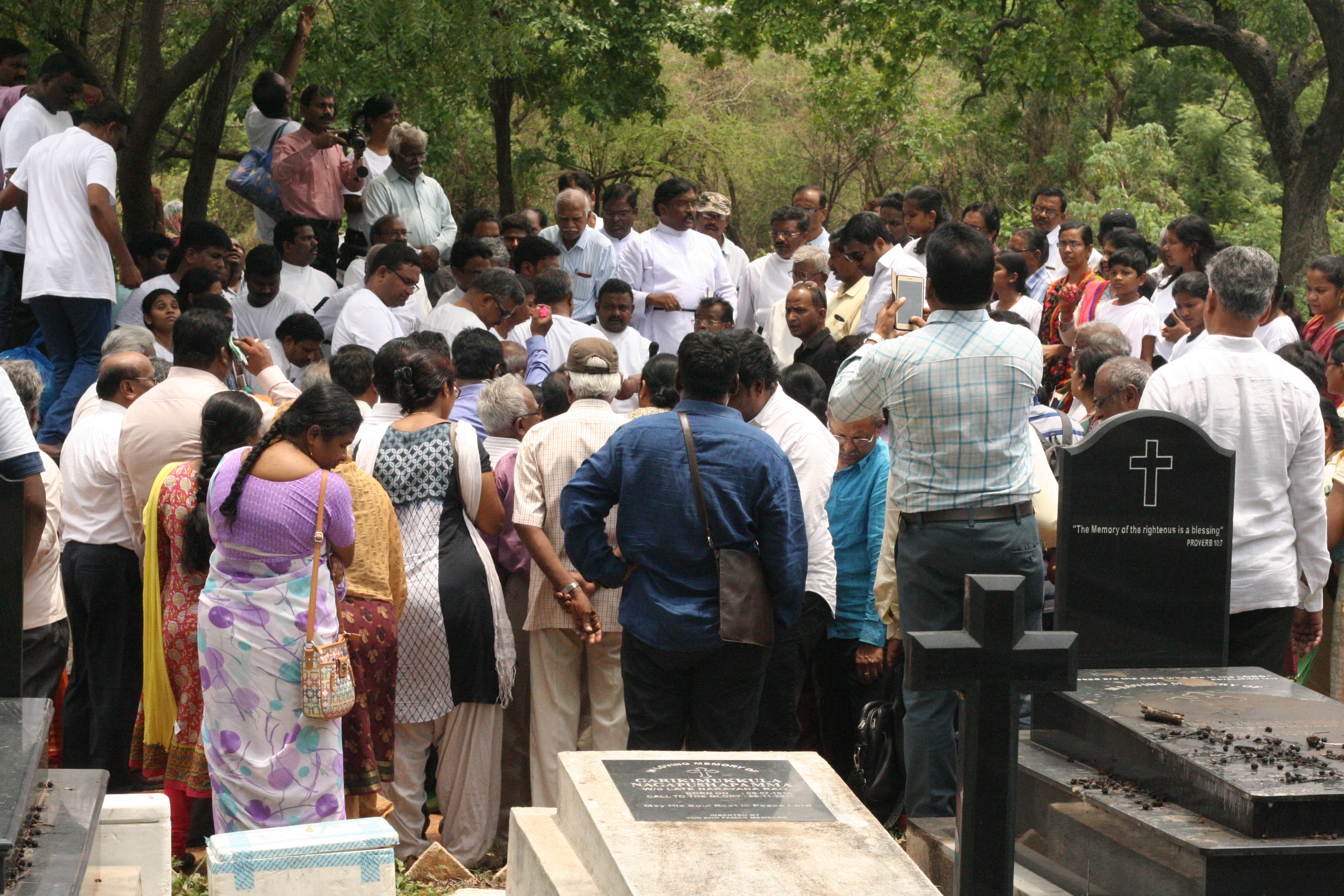
The faithful flock the graveside burial ceremony of Bishop Prakasa Rao on 1 June 2018 led by The Rev. U. Daniel, CSI, Ministerial Secretary, Medak Diocese.

In 2001, the Centre for Religious Studies at the State-run Andhra University, Waltair felicitated Prakasa Rao in his capacity as Bishop - in - Krishna-Godavari.

Prakasa Rao died on 30 May 2018, in Hyderabad and was buried with full ecclesiastical honours on 1 June 2018 at the CSI-Garrison Wesley Church Cemetery at Karkhana, Secunderabad.

Honorary titles
Preceded by N. D. Ananda Rao Samuel, CSI; 1961–1978	Member, Board of Governors; Andhra Christian Theological College, Hyderabad; 1981–2001	Succeeded by G. Dyvasirvadam, CSI; 2001–2018
Preceded by K. Nathaniel, AELC; 1993–1995	Chairperson, Board of Governors, Andhra Christian Theological College, Hyderabad; 1995-1996	Succeeded by K. Jesudas, SALC; 1996-1997
Religious titles
Preceded by N. D. Ananda Rao Samuel, CSI; 1961–1978	Bishop - in - Krishna-Godavari Diocese, (Church of South India); Vijayawada; 1981–2001	Succeeded by G. Dyvasirvadam, CSI; 2001–2018
Other offices
Preceded by B. G. Prasada Rao, CSI; 1969–1976	Auxiliary Secretary; Bible Society of India Andhra Pradesh Auxiliary, Secunderabad; 1976–1981	Succeeded by L. Prakasam, CBCNC; 1982–1998
