= Dara Noah Samuel =

- Bishop – in – Dornakal (1986-1996)
- Church: Church of South India
- Diocese: Dornakal
- In office: 1986-1996
- Predecessor: G. S. Luke
- Successor: A. Rajarathnam
- Previous posts: Pastor, Diocese of Dornakal(1966-1986)

Orders
- Ordination: 1 May 1968 by Bishop P. Solomon
- Consecration: 5 January 1986 by I. Jesudason, Moderator, Church of South India Synod and Sundar Clarke, Deputy Moderator, Church of South India Synod

Personal details
- Born: Narayanapuram, Khammam District
- Died: 13 July 1996 Khammam
- Buried: Epiphany Cathedral Compound, Dornakal

Bishop D. N. Samuel was the fifth Bishop - in - Dornakal Diocese of the Church of South India who occupied the Cathedra in the CSI-Epiphany Cathedral in Dornakal from 1986 until his sudden death on 13 July 1996 resulting in an unexpected sede vacante.

Samuel studied joined the Andhra Union Theological College (AUTC), Dornakal in 1963 but within a year, he moved along with the College to Rajahmundry as the AUTC together with other Seminaries formed the Andhra Christian Theological College in Rajahmundry in 1964. Samuel was awarded a Licentiate in Theology in 1966 and upgraded his academics by pursuing a Bachelor of Theology as well as a Bachelor of Divinity degree through the Andhra Christian Theological College which by then relocated to its present campus in Hyderabad. The Andhra Christian Theological College, Hyderabad where Samuel studied is affiliated to the Senate of Serampore College (University), India's first {a University under Section 2 (f) of the University Grants Commission Act, 1956} with degree-granting authority validated by a Danish Charter and ratified by the Government of West Bengal.

Noah Samuel studied at the CSI-Noble College at Machilipatnam taking a Secondary School Leaving Certificate in 1949 and continued his studies by passing the Matriculation Examination offered by the Andhra University and worked as a civilian with the Singareni Collieries Company. Akin to the early Church Fathers, in this case, Bishop Ambrose, Bishop of Milan, Noah Samuel left his civilian work in 1963 and enrolled for spiritual studies. On his ordination as Deacon on 24 April 1966 followed by his ordination as a Pastor in 1968 by Bishop P. Solomon, he served at the parishes of the Diocese of Dornakal.

In 1985 when Bishop G. S. Luke retired on attaining superannuation, the Diocese of Dornakal became sede vacante following which the Church of South India Synod appointed D. N. Samuel as the fifth Bishop - in - Dornakal to succeed Bishop G. S. Luke who was principally consecrated by I. Jesudason, Moderator, Church of South India Synod in the presence of Sundar Clarke, Deputy Moderator, Church of South India Synod and the co-consecrator.

Religious titles
Preceded by G. S. Luke; 1980-1985	Bishop - in - Diocese of Dornakal; Church of South India; 1986-1996	Succeeded by A. Rajarathnam; 1997-2006
Academic offices
Preceded by G. S. Luke; 1980-1985	Member, Board of Governors, Andhra Christian Theological College; Hyderabad; 1986-1996	Succeeded by A. Rajarathnam; 1997-2006
