= Gadam Samuel Luke =

Bishop G. S. Luke, CSI Bishop – in – Dornakal (1980-1985)
- The Right Reverend
- Church: Church of South India (A Uniting church comprising Wesleyan Methodist, Congregational, Calvinist, Presbyterian and Anglican missionary societies – ABCFM, Dutch Reformed Church, SPG, WMMS, LMS, Basel Mission, CMS, and the Church of England)
- Diocese: Dornakal
- In office: 1980-1985
- Predecessor: P. Solomon, CSI
- Successor: D. N. Samuel, CSI
- Previous posts: Pastor, Diocese of Dornakal (1945-1980)

Orders
- Ordination: 10 September 1950 by A. B. Elliott, CSI
- Consecration: 7 January 1980 by N. D. Ananda Rao Samuel, CSI (Principal Consecrator); Solomon Doraiswamy, CSI (Co-consecrator)
- Rank: Bishop

Personal details
- Born: Gadam Samuel Luke; 15 December 1920 Sriramulapalli, Hyderabad state
- Died: 16 March 2000 (aged 79) Khammam, Andhra Pradesh (1956–2014)
- Buried: Epiphany Cathedral Compound, Dornakal
- Denomination: Christianity
- Education: B. D. (Serampore)
- Alma mater: CSI-Wesley Boys' High School, Secunderabad {Andhra Pradesh (1956–2014)}; Madras Christian College, Tambaram (Tamil Nadu); United Theological College, Bangalore (Karnataka)

Bishop G. S. Luke was the fourth Bishop in Dornakal Diocese of the Church of South India occupying the Cathedra in the CSI-Epiphany Cathedral in Dornakal from 1980 to 1986.

== Early life and education ==
After early schooling at the mission schools in Jagtial, Medak and Secunderabad, Luke went to Madras in 1940 and studied at the Madras Christian College, Tambaram. After discerning his avocation towards priesthood, G.S Luke moved to the United Theological College, Bangalore where he studied from 1945 to 1948 for the graduate course leading to Bachelor of Divinity awarded by the Senate of Serampore College (University), India's first {a University under Section 2 (f) of the University Grants Commission Act, 1956} with degree-granting authority validated by a Danish Charter and ratified by the Government of West Bengal.

== Career ==
After his ordination in 1950 by Bishop A. B. Elliott, Luke ministered in the parishes of Diocese of Dornakal. In 1962, he went on a sabbatical to Episcopal Diocese of Olympia and on his return continued to pastor in the Diocese of Dornakal. In 1979, Bishop P. Solomon retired on attaining superannuation and the bishopric remained sede vacante. The Church of South India Synod appointed G. S. Luke whose consecration took place at the CSI-Epiphany Cathedral, Dornakal by N. D. Ananda Rao Samuel and Solomon Doraiswamy.

Luke was the brother of the educationist, G. S. Prakasha Rao. In 1983, Luke attended a national colloquium in Madras on Christian perspectives on contemporary Indian issues in which K. M. Mammen Mappillai also happened to take part. On his bishopric, Luke became a member of the Board of Governors of the Andhra Christian Theological College, Hyderabad in which the Diocese of Dornakal also has a stake.

In 1985, G. S. Luke retired on attaining superannuation resulting in sede vacante. Church of South India Synod filled it in 1986 with the appointment of D. N. Samuel.

M. Edwin Rao who compiled a centennial edition of the CSI-Diocese of Dornakal writes that G. S. Luke was a writer who used to contribute articles to the Telugu language magazine Kapari edited by the Baptist Pastor, A. B. Masilamani of the Convention of Baptist Churches of Northern Circars.

Religious titles
Preceded by P. Solomon; 1956-1979	Bishop - in - Diocese of Dornakal; Church of South India; 1980-1986	Succeeded by D. N. Samuel; 1986-1996
Academic offices
Preceded by P. Solomon; 1964-1979	Member, Board of Governors, Andhra Christian Theological College, Hyderabad; 1980-1986	Succeeded by D. N. Samuel; 1986-1996
