= Bachu Sathyanandam Devamani =

Indian Protestant bishop

- Bishop – in – Dornakal (2006-2012)
- Church: Christian
- Diocese: Dornakal
- See: Church of South India
- In office: 2006-2012
- Predecessor: A. Rajarathnam
- Successor: V. Prasada Rao
- Previous posts: Director, Pastoral Aid Department, Church of South India Synod(1995-1998)

Orders
- Ordination: 1976 by Bishop P. Solomon
- Consecration: 2006 by B. P. Sugandhar, Moderator, Church of South India Synod and S. Vasantha Kumar, Deputy Moderator, Church of South India Synod

Personal details
- Died: 22 April 2013 Hyderabad
- Buried: Epiphany Cathedral compound, Dornakal

Bishop B. S. Devamani was the seventh Bishop - in - Dornakal Diocese of the Church of South India whose bishopric was from 2006 to 2012.

== Studies ==
After initial studies in English literature at the CSI-Noble College, Machilipatnam and teaching in Mulug, Devamani was sent for spiritual studies by Bishop P. Solomon to study at the Anglican Bishop's College, Kolkata affiliated to the Senate of Serampore College (University), India's first {a university under Section 2 (f) of the University Grants Commission Act, 1956} with degree-granting authority validated by a Danish Charter and ratified by the Government of West Bengal. From 1972 to 1975, Devamani was in Kolkata studying at the Bishop's College for the graduate degree of Bachelor of Divinity under faculty including Yisu Das Tiwari and others after which the Senate of Serampore College (University) under the Registrarship of Chetti Devasahayam awarded him a graduate degree.

For postgraduate studies, Devamani was sent in 1978 to the General Episcopal Theological Seminary in New York City where he specialized in inter-religious studies researching on the Indian Vaishnava Saint Ramanuja under J. A. Carpenter resulting in a dissertation which Devamani later published it in 1990 under the title The Religion of Ramanuja: A Christian Appraisal. From New York, Devamani moved to the Diocese of Canterbury, England to minister there for a year and returned in 1981 to the Diocese of Karimnagar to continue his pastoral ministry in Kazipet.

Again in 1990, Devamani was sent by the Church of South India Synod to pursue doctoral studies in ministry at the Chicago Theological Seminary, Chicago where he studied up to 1992. Devamani's doctoral dissertation was solely based out of his pastoral experiences at Kazipet which was entitled Practice of mission at St. John's Congregation of Kazipet in the Church of South India. While in Chicago, Devamani also pastored rural congregations of Odell and Emington under the United Church of Christ.

== Ministry and Bishopric ==
Ever since his ordination in 1975/1976 as Deacon/Presbyter, Devamani began ministering in the parishes of Diocese of Dornakal. In 1995, Devamani returned to India as the Church of South India Synod made him Director of the Pastoral Aid Department. Again in 1998, Devamani was sent to the Diocese of Jerusalem as Pastor till 2000 and returned to the Diocese of Karimnagar to minister to the parishes.

In 2006 when Bishop A. Rajarathnam of the adjoining Diocese of Dornakal retired on attaining superannuation, Devamani contested for the bishopric and was declared elected by then Moderator of the Church of South India Synod, B. P. Sugandhar who principally consecrated him in the presence of the Deputy Moderator, S. Vasantha Kumar at the CSI-Epiphany Cathedral in Dornakal. Devamani's bishopric lasted from 2006 till 2012 the year in which he retired on superannuation.

Devamani died under tragic circumstances on 22 April 2013 in Hyderabad.

Religious titles
Preceded by A. Rajarathnam; 1996-2006	Bishop - in - Diocese of Dornakal; Church of South India; 2006-2012	Succeeded by V. Prasada Rao; 2012-Present
Academic offices
Preceded by A. Rajarathnam; 1996-2006	Member, Board of Governors, Andhra Christian Theological College; Hyderabad; 2006-2012	Succeeded by V. Prasada Rao; 2012-Present
