= George Cornelious =

Christian bishop

The Right Reverend T. George Cornelious, CSI Bishop - in - Krishna Godavari
- The Right Reverend
- Church: Church of South India (A Uniting church comprising Wesleyan Methodist, Congregational, Calvinist and Anglican missionary societies – SPG, WMMS, LMS, Basel Mission, CMS, and the Church of England)
- Diocese: Krishna Godavari Diocese
- In office: 2018-
- Predecessor: G. Dyvasirvadam, CSI
- Successor: Incumbent
- Previous post: Pastor

Orders
- Ordination: 16 June 1998 (as Deacon); 30 November 1999 (as Pastor) by T. B. D. Prakasa Rao, CSI
- Consecration: 29 May 2018 by Thomas K Oommen, CSI (Principal consecrator), V. Prasada Rao, CSI (Co-consecrator)
- Rank: Bishop

Personal details
- Born: Tantepudi George Cornelious; 18 April 1961 (age 65) Chevuru Village 521 329, Mudinepalli mandal, Krishna District, Andhra Pradesh, India
- Denomination: Christianity
- Residence: Machilipatnam
- Parents: Smt. Deenamma (Mother); Rev. T. Paramanandam (Father)
- Occupation: Anglican Priest
- Education: B. Sc. (Andhra), B. D. (Serampore)
- Alma mater: CSI-Noble College, Machilipatnam (Andhra Pradesh), Andhra Christian Theological College, Secunderabad (Telangana)

Tantepudi George Cornelious (born 18 April 1961) is the current Bishop - in - Krishna Godavari Diocese of the Church of South India with the Bishop's Cathedra housed in CSI-St. Andrew's Cathedral in Machilipatnam. However, for administrative purposes, the Office of the Bishopric is located in Vijayawada with its ecclesiastical jurisdiction encompassing the civil districts of Srikakulam, Vizianagaram, Visakhapatnam, East Godavari, West Godavari, Krishna, and Guntur in Andhra Pradesh.

George Cornelious has the responsibility of overseeing a Church that comprises faithful who are spread across the Northern Circars of Andhra Pradesh, which owes its existence to then mission societies comprising the London Missionary Society and the Church Missionary Society which grounded their mission stations in Visakhapatnam and Machilipatnam, respectively, in the 19th century, that since got unionized into the Church of South India in 1947. The geographical area also comprises the Roman Catholics, the other Protestants and a host of new and indigenous Churches and the Bishop also has the additional burden of fostering ecumenism.

== Spiritual formation ==
After initial studies leading to sciences, George Cornelious discerned his avocation in the 1990s and chose to become a Priest and then Bishop, T. B. D. Prakasa Rao, CSI, became his Spiritual Confessor and guided his spiritual formation and sent him to the Protestant Regional Theologiate in Secunderabad which had been known for its scholarship in Biblical studies with past faculty of the 1970s that comprised Victor Premasagar, CSI, K. David, CBCNC, Gaddala Solomon, STBC and Suppogu Joseph, STBC.

George Cornelious began his theological studies studying for a Bachelor of Divinity for the period 1990-1993 as a ministerial candidate of the Krishna Godavari diocese and began his spiritual formation at the Protestant Regional Theologiate - the near-ecumenical Andhra Christian Theological College in Secunderabad, affiliated to India's first University, the Senate of Serampore College (University) {a University under Section 2 (f) of the University Grants Commission Act, 1956} with degree-granting authority validated by a Danish Charter and ratified by the Government of West Bengal.

Cornelious studied at the Seminary under Spiritual Formators comprising M. Victor Paul, AELC, Regunta Yesurathnam, CSI, G. T. Abraham, CSI and others. The Old Testament faculty comprised G. Babu Rao, CBCNC and N. V. Luther Paul, AELC. There were also international scholars available at the Seminary from Germany and Canada consisting Klaus Schäfer, Dr. Theol. (Hamburg) and Ray Waldock, Ph. D. (Montreal).

After a three-year study period, George Cornelious was awarded a B. D. in the ensuing convocation of the Senate of Serampore College (University) by then Registrar, D. S. Satyaranjan, IPC.

== Ordination and ministry ==
After spiritual formation in Secunderabad, then Bishop, T. B. D. Prakasa Rao, CSI, ordained George Cornelious as Deacon on 16 June 1998 after which he began his ministry in the Krishna Godavari Diocese and after a gap of one year, he was finally ordained as a Priest on 30 November 1999.

== Bishopric ==
In early 2018 when G. Dyvasirvadam relinquished the Cathedra on attaining extended superannuation, the Diocese was left Sede vacante following which the Church of South India Synod supervised elections to the Diocese and George Cornelious who was in the fray for the bishopric was elected and consecrated on 29 May 2018 at CSI-St. Andrews's Cathedral, Machilipatnam by Moderator Thomas K Oommen, CSI the Principal Consecrator and V. Prasada Rao, CSI, Co-consecrator in the presence of Bishops of the other diocese and a host of clergy comprising Daniel Sadananda, CSI, General Secretary of the Synod.

Religious titles
Preceded by G. Dyvasirvadam; 2002-2018	Bishop - in - Krishna Godavari Diocese (Church of South India); Machilipatnam; 2018-Present	Succeeded by Incumbent
