= Diocese of Dornakal of the Church of South India =

Diocese of the Church of South India in Telangana, India

Diocese of Dornakal
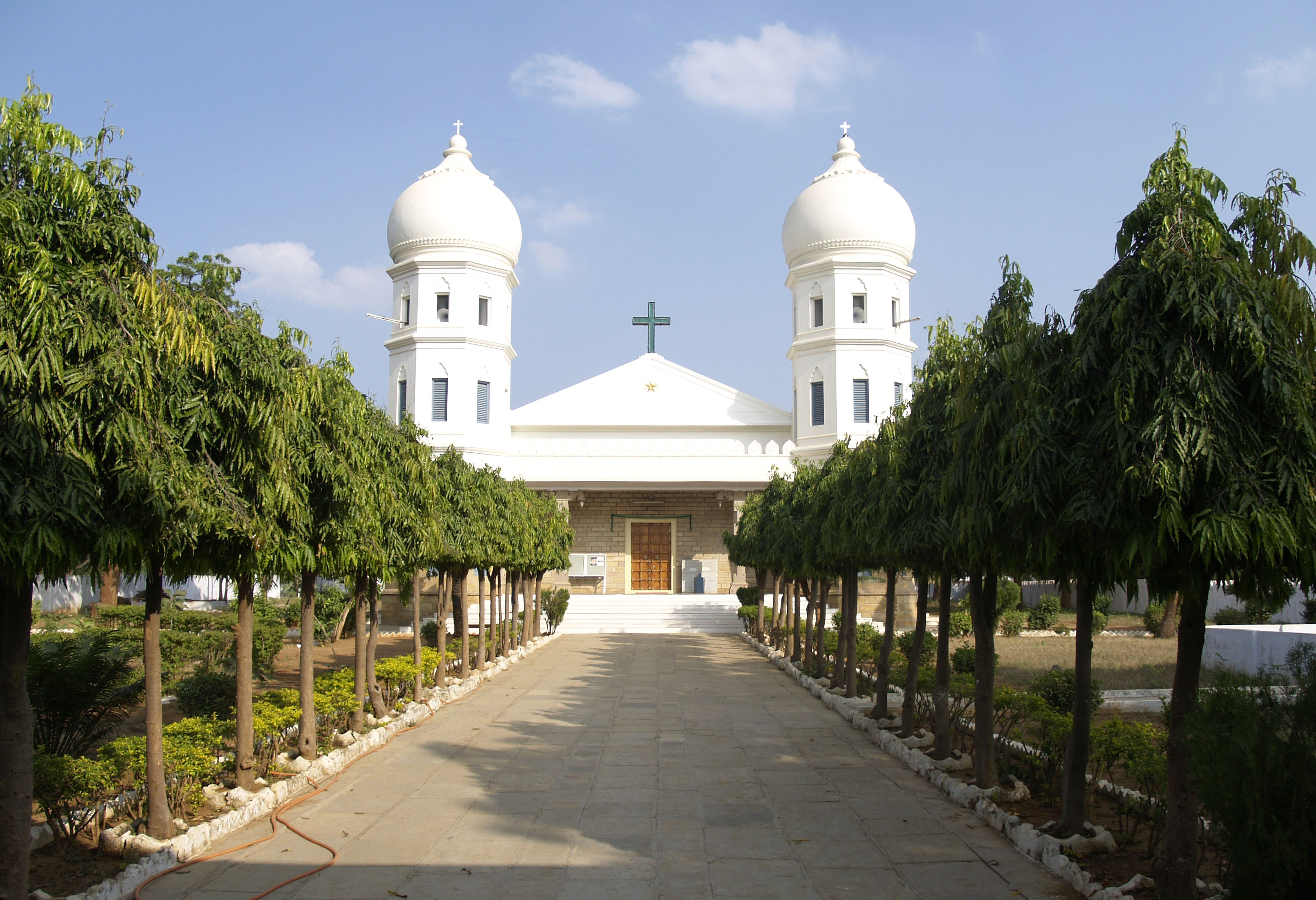
- Epiphany Cathedral, Dornakal

Location
- Country: India
- Ecclesiastical province: Church of South India

Information
- Cathedral: Epiphany Cathedral, Dornakal

Current leadership
- Bishop: The. Rt. Revd. Dr. Senam Raj Kora

Dornakal Diocese is a diocese of the Church of South India in Telangana state of India. The diocese mainly covers the pastorates in Warangal, Nalgonda, East Godavari and Khammam districts and also has churches in Odissha state. The Church of South India is a United Protestant denomination.

== History ==
The Diocese of Dornakal was formed in December 1912. Vedanayagam Samuel Azariah was consecrated as its first bishop in St. Paul's Cathedral, Calcutta. Azariah was the first Indian to be consecrated a bishop in the Anglican Communion and was a leader in the Christian evangelistic movement in South Asia during the early twentieth century.

When the diocese was first formed, it was a small district in the southeast corner of the Nizam's dominions. A few years later, it was enlarged by the addition of the Dummugudem district, in which the Church Missionary Society (CMS) was working.

In 1920, a resolution of the Episcopal Synod placed all of the districts of both the CMS and the Society for the Propagation of the Gospel (SPG) in the Telugu country under the jurisdiction of the Bishop of Dornakal.

The Cathedral of the Epiphany in Dornakal was consecrated on 6 January 1939.

In 1940, the Presbyterian, Methodist, Congregational and Anglican churches of the region came together to form the Church of South India.

== Geography ==
The present Diocese of Dornakal includes a large portion of the Krishna district, part of the Godavari districts, parts of the Kurnool and Kadapa districts to the south served by the SPG, the areas in the Hyderabad State served by the Indian Missionary Society of Tinnevelly (IMST), the Singareni Mission, the Khammamett Mission, and the recently formed Dornakal Diocesan Mission, which started in the Mulag Taluq.

The main towns in the diocese are Khammam and Kothagudem, and they host the largest congregations. The diocese has approximately 900 congregations.

The diocese is partnered with the Diocese of Gloucester in England.

== Funding ==
The former president bishop of the church Rt. Rev. Dr Vadapalli Prasada Rao stated that the church is run entirely on Indian funds, which he says helps ensure the churches continued independence from the "Anglican Communion".

== Bishops ==
- Vedanayagam Samuel Azariah (1912–45)
- A. B. Elliott (1945–1955)
  - Yeddu Muthyalu, assistant bishop (1945–1947; became first Bishop in Krishna-Godavari)
- P. Solomon (1956–1979)
- G. S. Luke (1980–1985)
- D. N. Samuel (1986–1996)
- A. Rajarathnam (1997–2006)
- B. S. Devamani (2006–2012)
- Dr.V. Prasada Rao (2012–7.9.2020)
- Dr.K. Padma Rao (20.06.2021–22.06.2026)
- Dr. K. Senam Raj (02.08.2026 - Present)

== Group church councils and chairman ==
- Rev. G. J. Kantha Rao, Dornakal GCC
- Rev. K. George Clement, Khammam GCC
- Rev. B. Abhijith, singareni GCC
- Rev. K. T. Vijay Kumar, Dummagudem GCC
- Rev. A. Ramesh, Sathupally GCC
- Rev. P. Ramesh, Kodad GCC
- Rev. S. George, Sagar GCC
- Rev. B. Srinivas paul, NSP GCC
- Rev. P. Sunil Sreedhar, Yellandu GCC
- Rev. R. Israel Reddy, Manuguru GCC
- Rev. Y. Ravi Kumar, Maredumilli GCC

== Churches ==
- CSI Epiphany Cathedral Church, Dornakal
- St. Andrew's Church, Kothagudem
- St. Andrew'sChurch, kalyanapuram
- St. Mary's Church, Khammam
- St. Paul's Church, Aswapuram
- St. Paul's Church, P.V. Colony
- Christ Church, Bhadrachalam
- St. Peter's Church Kodad
- St. Paul's Church, Mahabubabad
- St. Paul's Church, Palwancha
- St. Timothy Church, Huzurnagar
- St. John's Church, Yellandu
- St. John's Church, J.K colony, Yellandu
- St. Philip's Church, Nava bharat
- Christ Church, Indira Nagar, KMM
- St. Mark's Church, NSP, Khammam
- St. Luke Church, Singabhupalem, KTDM
- St. Thomas Church, Ramavaram, KTDM
- St. James Church, Gouthampur
- St Peter's Church, Rudrampur
- Christ Church, Parsibandam, khammam
- St. John's Church v.m.banjara,
- St. Peter's church, Madiripuram, Near Bangla
- Church Of South India, Miryalaguda, Dornakal Diocese
- St. Andrew's Church, Anisettipally

== Educational institutions ==
- Bishop Azariah High School for Girls, Dornakal
- Bishop Azariah Junior college for Girls, Dornakal
- Bishop Azariah Degree College, Dornakal
- Dornakal Diocese. Junior College, Dornakal
- Dornakal Diocese. High School, Dornakal
- St. Mary's High school, Khammam
- St. Andrew's High School, Kothagudem
- St. Christ Church Primary School, Bhadrachalam
- St. Peter's Primary School, Thoorubaka, Bhadrachalam
- Dorkal Diocese Hostel, Chadrupatla
- Mission High school (Aided), Madiripuram
