= Sabu Koshy Cherian =

20th and 21st-century Indian bishop

The Right Reverend Malayil Sabu Koshy Cherian
- Bishop of Madhya Kerala Diocese
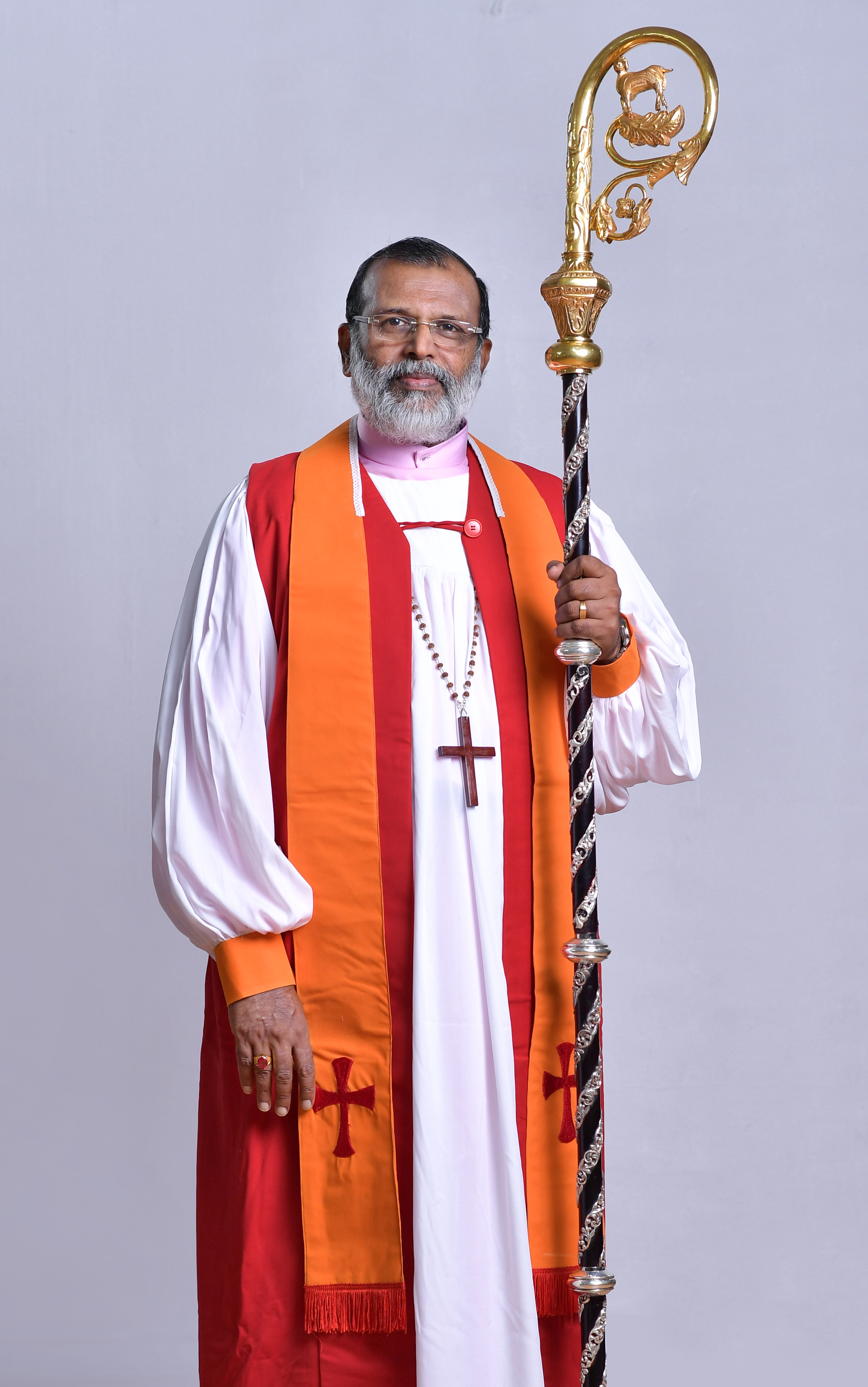
- Church: Church of South India
- Diocese: Madhya Kerala
- In office: 2021 – present
- Predecessor: Thomas K Oommen
- Previous post

Ordination history
History
Diaconal ordination
- Ordained by: M. C. Mani
Priestly ordination
- Ordained by: M. C. Mani

Orders
- Consecration: 18 January 2021 by Dharmaraj Rasalam, Theodosius Mar Thoma, K. Reuben Mark and others
- Rank: Bishop

Personal details
- Born: 26 August 1961 (age 65) Punnackadu, now Pathanamthitta district, Kerala, India
- Residence: CSI Bishop's House, Kottayam
- Spouse: Dr. Jessy Sara Koshy
- Education: New York Theological Seminary (Doctor of Ministry); UBS Pune (BD)

Malayil Sabu Koshy Cherian (born 26 August 1961) is the 13th Bishop of the Madhya Kerala Diocese of the Church of South India.

== Early life and education ==
Sabu Koshy Cherian was born into the Saint Thomas Anglican family of Malayil, in Punnackadu, Kozhencherry. His father M. K. Cherian was a retired teacher from CMS High School, Kuzhikkala, and mother Aleyamma Cherian was also a retired teacher from Government High School, Kozhencherry. He earned BSc in mathematics, PGDCA, B.Ed., and MA in sociology. Later he received his Bachelor of Divinity (BD) from UBS, Pune and Doctor of Ministry from New York Theological Seminary.

== Ecclesiastical career ==
Cherian was ordained as a deacon of the CSI in 1988 and a presbyter in 1989. He was elected as the Treasurer of the Diocese of Madhya Kerala in 2014 for three years. Being the Treasurer, he introduced centralized salary system for all clergy and evangelists, took special care to protect and safeguard the Diocesan property, successfully managed diocesan Bi-centenary celebrations and 35th session of CSI Synod meeting during the demonetization period, renewed rental agreements of the shopping complex tenants, which was pending for decades, in line with the current market rates. He was consecrated as the 13th Bishop of the Church of South India Madhya Kerala diocese at the Holy Trinity Cathedral, Kottayam on 18 January 2021 by CSI Moderator Dharmaraj Rasalam, Theodosius Mar Thoma Metropolitan, CSI Deputy Moderator K. Reuben Mark and other CSI bishops.

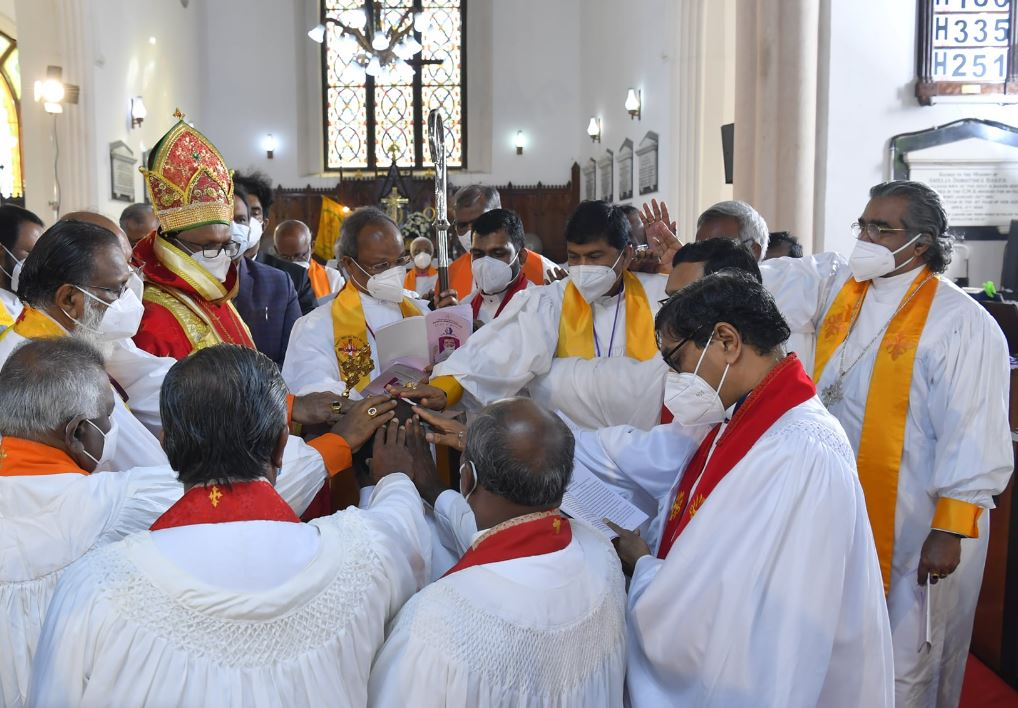
Laying on of hands by CSI Moderator Dharmaraj Rasalam, Theodosius Mar Thoma Metropolitan and other bishops, during the bishopric consecration of Sabu Koshy Cherian

Religious titles
Preceded by Thomas K Oommen	Bishop - in - Madhya Kerala Diocese; Church of South India; 2021–present	Succeeded by Incumbent
