= Vellalanvilai =

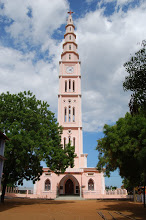

- Location in Tamil Nadu, India Vellalanvilai (India)
- Coordinates: 8.4701°N 78.0402°E
- Country: India
- State: Tamil Nadu
- District: Tuticorin

Population
  - Total: 1,947

Languages
  - Official: Tamil
- Time zone: UTC+5:30 (IST)
- PIN: 628219
- Telephone code: +91-4639
- Vehicle registration: TN 69
- Nearest city: Udangudi, Tiruchendur
- Lok Sabha: Tuticorin
- Vidhan Sabha: Tiruchendur
- Website: VELLALANVILAI

Vellalanvilai is a village panchayat in Thoothukudi district in the Indian state of Tamil Nadu. As of 2011 India census, Vellalanvilai had a population of 1947. The nearby villages are Zion Nagar, Thandupathu, Vattanvilai and Mannadu. The nearby towns are Thoothukudi(45 km), Tirunelveli (55 km), Tiruchendur (11 km) and Udangudi (5 km). The nearest harbor and airport is situated at Thoothukudi (45 km). Major District Road(MDR) 331 is passing through Vellalanvilai and connecting Paramankurichi and Udangudi. Dedicated Post Office is located in Vellalanvilai.

== Church ==
It is famous for 'aSANAM' which is conducted every year in the month of May on the 3rd Sunday and Monday.[citation needed]

== Schools and colleges ==
Today Vellalanvilai offers a more modern, comprehensive education to an enlarged number of local youths.

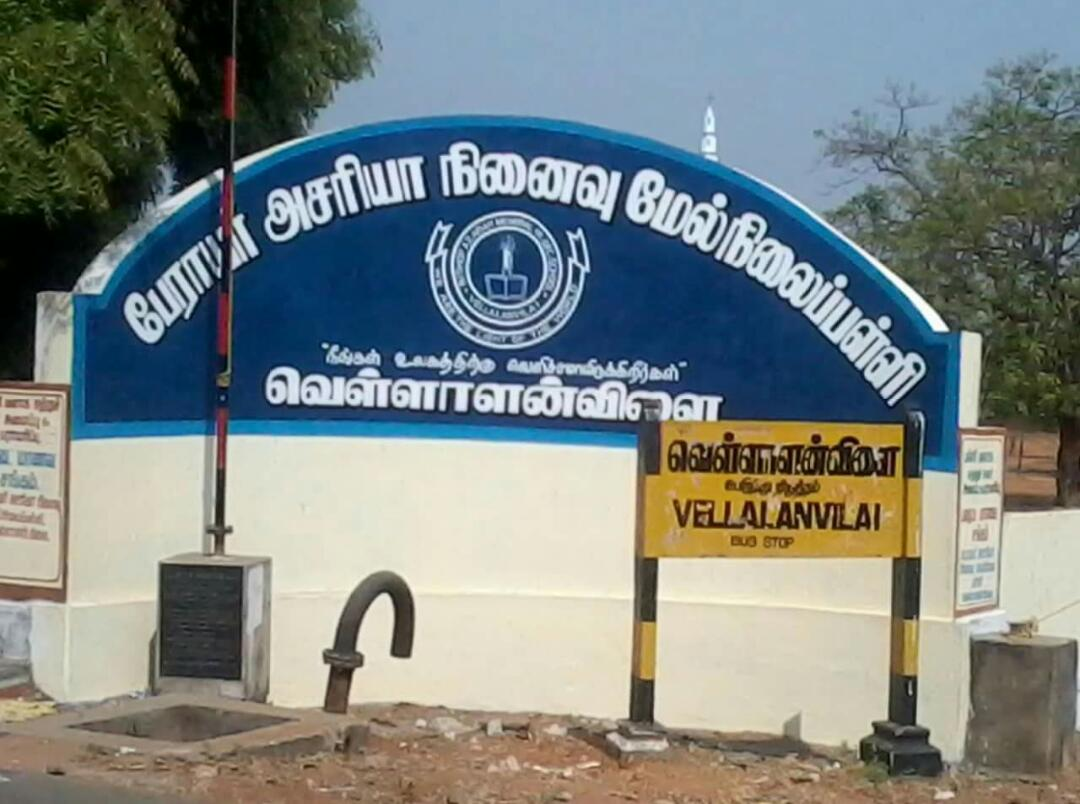
Bishop Azaiah Memorial Hr. Sec. School

- BISHOP AZARIAH Arts and Science College
- BISHOP AZARIAH Memorial Higher Secondary School, founded in 1963.
- BISHOP AZARIAH English Medium School.
- TDTA Primary School.

== History ==
During the second half of the 19th century, the Nadars purchased most of the lands from Manadu Vellalar landlords. Thus the region is being called by Vellalanvilai. Agriculture is the major source of livelihood for the people. The first Vellalanvilai Nadars became Christians in the early 1840s. People in this region are mainly involved in cultivation of Coconuts, Betel Leaf, Rice, Bananas and manufacturing of palmyra tree (Borassus) products. Around 2005, the salt water intrusion has put an end to farming in and around vellalanvilai.

== Weather ==
The climate is very pleasant in rainy and winter season(temperature ranges between 22 °C to 27 °C), and very hot in summer (temperature ranges between 25 °C to 39 °C). A pleasant wind blows in the evening all around the year as it is very near to the Bay of Mannar.

- Vedanayagam Samuel Azariah, first Indian Bishop in the churches of the Anglican Communion.
- Immanuel, former panjayath president of Vellalanvilai
- Dr. Thambiraj
- Armstrong, A successful farmer

== Snippets of Vellalanvilai history ==
- First Gospel was announced by Nellai Appostalan Rev. C.T.E Renius
- First presbyter was Rev. T. Vedhanayagam Thomas.
- 1838 - Gospel announced by Nellai Appostalan Rev. John Thomas.
- 1841 - New Church was born.
- 1844 - Land was purchased for establishing church.
- 1879 - Church construction was completed.
- 06.04-1990 - The 111-year-old church collapsed.
- 14.05.1990 - Laid foundation of incumbent Church.
- 02.01.1991 - Laid foundation of incumbent Church Tower.
- 17.05.1993 - Incumbent Church was dedicated.
- 19.05.2007 - Incumbent Church Tower was dedicated.
- 21.05.2017 - Celebrated silver jubilee of incumbent Church.
- 19.05.2019 - Celebrated 175th dedication anniversary of St. Trinity Church.
