= Allu Rajarathnam =

Indian bishop (1941–2019)

- Bishop – in – Dornakal (1996-2006)
- Church: Christian
- Diocese: Dornakal
- See: Church of South India
- In office: 1996-2006
- Predecessor: D. N. Samuel
- Successor: B. S. Devamani
- Previous post(s): Pastor, Diocese of Dornakal(1966-1996)

Orders
- Ordination: 1966 by Bishop P. Solomon
- Consecration: 30 May 1997 January 1986 by Vasant P. Dandin, Moderator, Church of South India Synod and William Moses, Deputy Moderator, Church of South India Synod

Personal details
- Born: 11 April 1941; Dornakal, Khammam District
- Died: 1 April 2019; Hyderabad
- Buried: Epiphany Cathedral compound, Dornakal

Bishop A. Rajarathnam was Bishop - in - Dornakal Diocese of the Church of South India and the sixth in succession.

Like his predecessor D. N. Samuel, Rajarathnam also studied at the Andhra Union Theological College (AUTC), Dornakal in 1963 but within a year, he moved along with the College to Rajahmundry as the AUTC together with other Seminaries formed the Andhra Christian Theological College in Rajahmundry in 1964. Rajarathnam was awarded a Licentiate in Theology in 1966 and upgraded his academics by pursuing a Bachelor of Theology as well as a Bachelor of Divinity degree through the Andhra Christian Theological College which by then relocated to its present campus in Hyderabad. The Andhra Christian Theological College, Hyderabad where Rajarathnam studied is affiliated to the Senate of Serampore College (University), India's first {a University under Section 2 (f) of the University Grants Commission Act, 1956} with degree-granting authority validated by a Danish Charter and ratified by the Government of West Bengal.

Rajarathnam first studied at the Mission school in Dornakal and became a Teacher from 1961-1963 where he taught at Madiripuram until 1963 when he enrolled for spiritual studies. After his ordination in 1966, he served as a Pastor in the Diocese of Dornakal. In 1996 when Bishop D. N. Samuel retired on attaining superannuation, the ensuing sede vacante was filled up by the Church of South India Synod by appointing Rajarathnam to the bishopric in 1997 who was principally consecrated by Vasanth P. Dandin, Moderator, Church of South India Synod and William Moses, Deputy Moderator, Church of South India Synod. In 1998, Rajarathnam attended the thirteenth Lambeth Conference presided over by George Carey, Archbishop of Canterbury.

On 11 April 2006, Rajarathnam stepped down as the Bishop-in-Dornakal due to superannuation causing the Diocese of Dornakal to be sede vacante. The Ramanuja Scholar, B. S. Devamani succeeded Rajarathnam as Bishop-in-Dornakal.

Religious titles
Preceded by D. N. Samuel; 1986–1996	Bishop – in – Diocese of Dornakal; Church of South India; 1997-2006	Succeeded by B. S. Devamani; 1996–2012
Honorary titles
Preceded by D. N. Samuel; 1986–1996	Member, Board of Governors, Andhra Christian Theological College, Hyderabad; 1997–2006	Succeeded by B. S. Devamani; 1996–2012
Preceded by S. Paul Raj, GSELC; 1999–2001	Chairperson, Board of Governors, Andhra Christian Theological College, Hyderabad; 2001–2003	Succeeded by G. Devadanam, STBC; 2003–2005
