= Diocese of Krishna-Godavari of the Church of South India =

Diocese of the Church of South India in Andhra Pradesh, India

Diocese of Krishna-Godavari

Location
- Country: India
- Ecclesiastical province: Church of South India
- Headquarters: Machilipatnam

Information
- Denomination: Church of South India
- Cathedral: St Andrew's Cathedral, Machilipatnam
- Language: Telugu & English

Current leadership
- Bishop: T. George Cornelious

Krishna-Godavari Diocese is a diocese of Church of South India in Andhra Pradesh state of India. The diocese is one among the 22 dioceses of Church of South India, a United Protestant denomination.

== About ==
The diocese covers the Krishna Godavari areas of Andhra Pradesh state. The headquarters of the diocese is at Machilipatnam.The Krishna-Godavari diocese is one of the largest diocese in Andhra Pradesh extending from Ongole District in the south through Srikakulam District in the northern part of Andhra Pradesh. The current bishop of the diocese is T. George Cornelius who is the new bishop of K.G.Diocese Church of South India.

== Bishops ==
=== Prior to the formation of the Church of South India ===
- Vedanayagam Samuel Azariah

=== From the time of the formation of the Church of South India ===
- Yeddy Muthyalu (1947-1955)
- A. B. Elliott (1955-1961)
- N. D. Ananda Rao Samuel (1961–1980)
- T. B. D. Prakasa Rao (1981–2001)
- G. Dyvasirvadam (2002-2018)
- T. George Cornelious (2018-“present”)
