= Govada Dyvasirvadam =

20th and 21st-century Indian bishop

- Bishop Emeritus, Krishna-Godavari Diocese of the Church of South India
- Church: Church of South India
- Diocese: Diocese of Krishna-Godavari
- See: Church of South India
- In office: 2002–2018
- Predecessor: T. B. D. Prakasa Rao
- Successor: T. George Cornelious
- Previous post: General Secretary of the Church of South India

Orders
- Ordination: 16 June 1979 (as Deacon); 16 December 1979 (as Priest) by As Deacon by Bishop Henry Lazarus; As Priest by Bishop H. D. L. Abraham
- Consecration: 24 November 2002 by K. J. Samuel
- Rank: Bishop

Personal details
- Born: 28 March 1951 (age 75) Challapalli, Andhra Pradesh

Govada Dyvasirvadam (born 28 March 1951) is Bishop Emeritus of Krishna-Godavari Diocese of the Church of South India (which incorporates Anglicans, Methodists, and Presbyterians).

St. Andrew's Cathedral in Machilipatnam was the seat of the Bishop-in-Krishna Godavari.

Earlier, in 1998, Dyvasirvadam was elected as the General Secretary of the CSI, the youngest ever in the church's history.

Dyvasirvadam was also a member of the Central Committee of the World Council of Churches headquartered in Geneva as well as a member of the General Committee of the Christian Conference of Asia headquartered in Thailand.

== Early years ==
Dyvasirvadam was born on 28 March 1951 in Challapalli in Krishna District. He was the tenth child of his parents, Rev. Govada Devamani and Smt. Suguna Sundaram. Schooling was in Krishna and West Godavari districts. He had been an alumnus of Sreemanthu Raja Higher Secondary School, Challapalli in Krishna District and the Municipal School in Eluru in West Godavari District.

Dyvasirvadam later did his college studies in A.V.N. College (established in 1860), one of the oldest institutes in Visakhapatnam.

Dyvasirvadam also pursued post-graduate studies in Noble College, Machilipatnam and was inspired by the then Bishop in Krishna-Godavari, N. D. Ananda Rao Samuel.

== Ordination and pastorship ==
After studying at the Bishop's College in Calcutta, the Diocese of Krishna Godavari first posted Dyvasirvadam to Kanumolu near Hanuman Junction in Krishna District.

In March 1978, Dyvasirvadam was ordained by Bishop Henry Lazarus as a deacon in the St. Andrew's Church in Machilipatnam. Later, he was posted to Christ Church in Eluru in West Godavari District. The then Moderator's Commissary, H. D. L. Abraham (Bishop in Medak) ordained him as a priest.

== Higher studies and professorship ==
With interest to pursue higher studies in theology, the Diocese granted Dyvasirvadam study leave. Dyvasirvadam proceeded to the United Theological College, Bangalore, [the only autonomous college under the Senate of Serampore College] and enrolled himself for the post-graduate degree of Master of Theology (M. Th.) in the discipline of Systematic Theology studying between the years 1982–1984 and worked out a dissertation entitled Eschatological motifs in process theologies under the Principalship of Joshua Russell Chandran

After successful completion of post-graduate studies in theology, his diocese assigned Dyvasirvadam a teaching task at the ecumenical Andhra Christian Theological College in Hyderabad in which his diocese is a participating member. Dyvasirvadam taught Systematic theology to students pursuing Bachelor of Theology (B.Th.) and Bachelor of Divinity (BD) degrees.

== Research ==
Later, on invitation from the UTC, Bangalore, Dyvasirvadam went on study leave to serve as the Acting Registrar there. Subsequently, he enrolled for pursuing the doctoral degree (Doctor of Theology – D. Th.) in the South Asia Theological Research Institute (SATHRI) in Bangalore. He chose the discipline of Liberation Theology.

== Synod of the CSI ==
In 1992, Dyvasirvadam was recalled to the Church of South India Society by then Moderator, Bird Ryder Devapriam and was assigned the responsibility of overseeing pastoral concerns and became Director of the Pastoral Aid Department of the Church of South India Synod, Chennai.

The biennial Synod of the CSI elected Dyvasirvadam as its general secretary in 1998 in Arogyavaram in Chittoor District, succeeding George Koshy. He was re-elected unanimously in the Synod of 2000 in Secunderabad and in the Synod of 2002 in Melukavumattam.

Dyvasirvadam has been elected as the Deputy Moderator of CSI in the Synod of 2012 at Kanyakumari.

Dyvasirvadam has been elected as the Moderator of CSI in the Synod of 2014 at Vijayawada.

== Bishopric ==
The CSI Diocese of Krishna-Godavari is one of the largest extending from Ongole District in the south through Srikakulam District in the northern circars of Andhra Pradesh. Its cathedral was first erected in Eluru and was subsequently shifted to Vijayawada. Earlier bishop's who served in this diocese were notable and exemplary. Following the retirement of T. B. D. Prakasa Rao, Dyvasirvadam was elected unopposed. Subsequently, the cathedral was shifted to Machilipatnam.

The Moderator of the CSI during that time was K. J. Samuel who principally consecrated him in the St. Andrew's Cathedral in Machilipatnam.

== Honours ==
In the year 2001, friends of Dyvasirvadam proceeded to write a 365-page festschrift in his honour on the occasion of the completion of fifty years. Vinod Victor, Leslie Nathaniel and P. Surya Prakash edited the festschrift.

Church of South India Ecclesiastical Titles
Preceded by George Koshy^{Laity} 1990–1998	General Secretary; Church of South India Synod; Chennai; 1998–2002	Succeeded by Pauline Sathyamurthy^{Laity} 2002–2008
Preceded by T. B. D. Prakasa Rao, CSI; 1981–2001	Bishop – in – Krishna Godavari; Machilipatnam; 2002–2018	Succeeded by T. George Cornelious, CSI; 2018–present
Preceded by G. Devakadasham, CSI; 2010–2012	Deputy Moderator; Church of South India Synod; 2012–2014	Succeeded by Thomas K. Oommen, CSI; 2014–2017
Preceded by G. Devakadasham, CSI; 2012–2014	Moderator; Church of South India Synod; 2014–2017	Succeeded by Thomas K. Oommen, CSI; 2017–2019
Academic offices
Preceded by R. Yesurathnam, CSI; B. J. Christie Kumar, STBC	Teacher – in – Systematic theology Andhra Christian Theological College, Secunderabad; 1984–1992	Succeeded by R. Yesurathnam, CSI; B. J. Christie Kumar, STBC
Honorary titles
Preceded by P. Surya Prakash, CSI; 2010–2015	Chairperson, Henry Martin Institute, Hyderabad; 2015–2019	Succeeded by Geevarghese Mar Yulios; 2019-present
Preceded by K. Frederick Paradesi Babu, AELC; 2013–2015	Chairperson, Board of Governors, Andhra Christian Theological College, Secunderabad; 2015–2018	Succeeded by R. R. D. Sajeeva Raju, STBC
Preceded by B. P. Sugandhar, CSI	Chairperson, United Theological College, Bangalore; 2003–2009	Succeeded by P. Surya Prakash, CSI; 2009–2012
