= Ananda Rao Samuel =

Bishop of the Church of South India

Bishop N. D. Ananda Rao Samuel, CSI Bishop - in - Krishna-Godavari (1961-1978) Deputy Moderator of CSI Synod (1972-1974) Moderator of CSI Synod (1974-1980)
- The Most Reverend
- Church: Church of South India (A Uniting church comprising Wesleyan Methodist, Congregational, Calvinist, Presbyterian and Anglican missionary societies – ABCFM, Dutch Reformed Church, SPG, WMMS, LMS, Basel Mission, CMS, and the Church of England)
- Diocese: Diocese of Krishna-Godavari of the Church of South India
- In office: 1961–1978
- Predecessor: A. B. Elliott, CSI
- Successor: T. B. D. Prakasa Rao, CSI
- Previous posts: Parish Priest, Krishna-Godavari Diocese of the Church of South India

Orders
- Ordination: 14 June 1953 by Yeddu Muthyalu, CSI
- Consecration: 12 December 1961 by Hospet Sumitra, CSI
- Rank: Bishop

Personal details
- Born: N. D. Ananda Rao Samuel; 29 December 1928 Machilipatnam, Madras Presidency
- Died: 30 May 1999 (aged 70) Kolar Gold Fields, Karnataka
- Denomination: Christianity
- Education: B.A. (Andhra); M.A. (Andhra); B.D. (Serampore); S.T.M. (UTS)
- Alma mater: Noble College, Machilipatnam (Andhra Pradesh); United Theological College, Bangalore (Karnataka); Union Theological Seminary in the city of New York (United States)

N. D. Ananda Rao Samuel (1928–1999) was Bishop of Krishna Godavari of the Church of South India.

== Early years ==
Ananda Rao Samuel was born on 29 December 1928 in the port town of Machilipatnam, Andhra Pradesh into a Dalit Anglican family and studied at the local Noble College during 1944 to 1949 earning the degrees of BA and MA. His parents were Namala Jemima and Namala Thomas Gnanaprakasam.

== Theological life ==
The Church Missionary Society (CMS) brought about the Gospel in Machilipatnam. With the formation of the Church of South India (CSI) in 1947, the CMS got merged into the CSI. From 1950, Ananda Rao pursued a graduate degree in divinity (BD) at the United Theological College, Bengaluru as a candidate of the Church of South India, Diocese of Krishna-Godavari.

Soon after returning from Bengaluru in 1953, he was ordained on 14 June 1953 and made a Presbyter in Machilipatnam during the Bishopric of Yeddy Muthyalu.

Later in 1959 he was made Presbyter in Vijayawada during the Bishopric of A. B. Elliott.

In 1955, he was sent to the Union Theological Seminary in the city of New York where he earned an S.T.M. in Pastoral Counselling.

== Professorship ==
During the academic years 1949–1950 and 1954–1955, Ananda Rao lectured English Literature at the Andhra-Christian College, Guntur.

After Ananda Rao returned from the Union Theological Seminary in the city of New York in 1956, he began tutoring at the Andhra Union Theological Seminary, Dornakal.

After his chaplaincy stint at Vellore, Ananda Rao taught Pastoral Counselling at his alma mater, the United Theological College, Bengaluru.

== Contribution ==
Ananda Rao played a key role in priesthood for women. As Bishop and Moderator of the Church of South India, he brought about the topic for discussion and debate at synodical platforms. In 1980, the CSI passed a resolution granting ordination for theologically trained women.

The formation of the Joint Council of the Church of South India, Church of North India and the Mar Thoma is attributed to Ananda Rao. In Andhra Pradesh, Lutherans and Baptists could not join the Church of South India due to Lay leadership. However, Ananda Rao had been instrumental in trying to negotiate for their inclusion.

Ananda Rao participated in the Fifth Assembly of the World Council of Churches held from 23 November – 10 December 1975 in Nairobi

In 1993, he founded Pravaham in Vellore District.

Subsequent to his laying down the office of bishop, Ananda Rao was made Senior Chaplain at the Christian Medical College & Hospital, Vellore. Later after his death in 1999, Sundar Clarke released a book on his writings on 18 January 2001 in Vellore District.

== Bishopric ==
After the retirement of A. B. Elliott as bishop in Krishna-Godavari, N. D. Ananda Rao Samuel was elected unanimously as his successor in 1961 and consecrated in the Cathedral in Eluru on 12 December 1961.

He was also elected as the Moderator of the Church of South India at a later stage, succeeding Isaac Richard Harrison Gnanadasan.

== Honours ==
India's first University, the Senate of Serampore College (University) in West Bengal conferred upon Ananda Rao Samuel an honorary doctorate in 1989.

== Death ==
After teaching Christian Ministry at the United Theological College, Bengaluru, Ananda Rao began living in Chennai and died on 30 May 1999 in KGF.

== See also ==
- B. V. Subbamma
- Emani Sambayya
- Victor Premasagar
- G. Dyvasirvadam

Religious titles
Preceded by I. R. H. Gnanadasan, CSI; 1972	Moderator; Church of South India Synod; 1972–1980	Succeeded by Solomon Doraiswamy, CSI; 1980–1982
Preceded by Lesslie Newbigin, CSI; 1966–1972	Deputy Moderator; Church of South India Synod; 1972	Succeeded by Lesslie Newbigin, CSI; 1972-1974
Preceded by A. B. Elliott, CSI; 1954–1956	Bishop - in - Krishna-Godavari; Church of South India; 1961–1978	Succeeded by T. B. D. Prakasa Rao, CSI; 1981–2001
