= Thomas K. Oommen =

20th and 21st-century Indian bishop

The Right Reverend Thomas K. Oommen
- former Moderator Emeritus of the Church of South India and Bishop Emeritus of Madhya Kerala Diocese
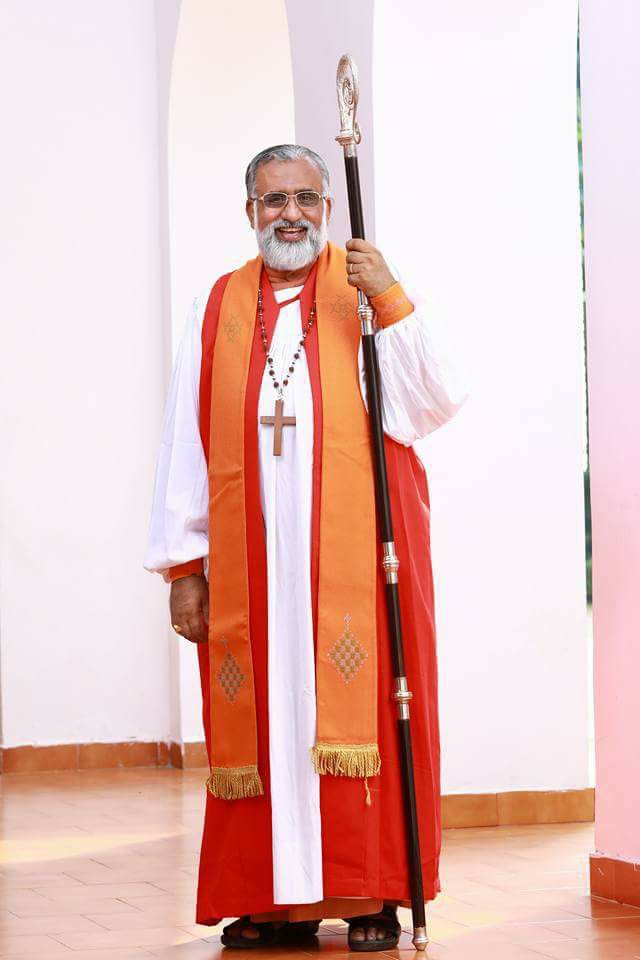
- Church: Church of South India
- Diocese: Madhya Kerala
- In office: 2011–2020 (Madhya Kerala); 2017–2019(Moderator)
- Predecessor: Thomas Samuel
- Successor: Sabu K. Cherian

Orders
- Ordination: 1982 by M. C. Mani
- Consecration: 5 March 2011 by S. Vasantha Kumar, Joseph Mar Thoma, G. Devakadasham & K. G. Daniel
- Rank: Bishop

Personal details
- Born: 29 November 1953 (age 72) Thalavady, Travancore Cochin, India

Thomas Kanjirappally Oommen (born 29 November 1953) is an Indian Anglican bishop. He was the Bishop of the Madhya Kerala Diocese and former Moderator of Church of South India.

== Early years ==
Thomas K Oommen was born on 29 November 1953, to an agrarian Saint Thomas Anglican family at Thalavady in Alappuzha district. He did his college education at NSS Hindu College, Changanassery. He had taken an undergraduate degree in divinity from Leonard Theological College, Jabalpur, Madhya Pradesh.

== Ecclesiastical career ==
Oommen was ordained deacon in 1982 and was made presbyter the next year. Oommen was elected as Bishop of Madhya Kerala Diocese of Church of South India in February 2011. He was ordained as the 12th Bishop of the CSI Madhya Kerala diocese at the Holy Trinity Cathedral, Kottayam on 5 March 2011. CSI Moderator Rt. Rev. S. Vasantha Kumar was the chief consecrator. Joseph Mar Thoma Metropolitan, CSI Deputy Moderator Rt. Rev. Gnanasigamony Devakadasham and CSI Bishop Rt. Rev. K. G. Daniel were Co-consecrators. Oommen was elected as the Deputy Moderator of Church of South India at the Church of South India Synod held at Vijayawada on 11 January 2014 and as the Moderator and Primate of Church of South India at the Synod held at Kottayam on 15 January 2017.

Religious titles
Preceded by Thomas Samuel	Bishop - in - Madhya Kerala Diocese; Church of South India; 2011–2020	Succeeded by Sabu K. Cherian
Preceded by G. Dyvasirvadam; 2014-2017	Moderator; Church of South India Synod; 2017-2020	Succeeded by Dharmaraj Rasalam; 2020-2023
Preceded by G. Dyvasirvadam; 2012-2014	Deputy Moderator; Church of South India Synod; 2014-2017	Succeeded by V. Prasada Rao; 2017-2020
