= Dharmaraj Rasalam =

CSI bishop

The Right Reverend Dharmaraj Rasalam
- Bishop of South Kerala
- Church: Church of South India
- Diocese: South Kerala
- Installed: 2011

Dharmaraj Rasalam is a bishop in the Church of South India: he has been Bishop of South Kerala since 2011 and Moderator of the Church of South India since 2020.

Rasalam was born in 1956 at Venganoor and educated at the University of Kerala. He completed his post-graduation in theology from Serampore University. He was ordained in 1987. He was consecrated as bishop on 23 July 2011 by CSI moderator S. Vasantha Kumar, with other CSI bishops and Mar Thoma bishop Thomas Mar Timotheos taking part as co-consecrators.

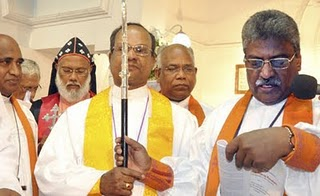
Dharmaraj Rasalam (middle) being handed over the episcopal staff as part of his consecration by CSI moderator S. Vasantha Kumar, with co-consecrators John Gladstone and Thomas Mar Timotheos of the Mar Thoma Syrian Church as witnesses
