= Yeddu Muthyalu =

Indian bishop (??–1954)

- Bishop – in – Krishna-Godavari (1947-1955)
- Church: Christian
- Diocese: Krishna-Godavari
- See: Church of South India
- In office: 1947-1954
- Predecessor: Post created (Previously V. S. Azariah of the Diocese of Dornakal)
- Successor: A. B. Elliott
- Previous posts: Pastor, Diocese of Dornakal (1924-1945); Tutor, Dornakal Divinity School (1929-1930); Assistant Bishop, Diocese of Dornakal (1945-1947)

Orders
- Ordination: 1924
- Consecration: 1945 as Assistant Bishop<

Personal details
- Born: 1924 Andhra Pradesh
- Died: 1954 Eluru, Andhra Pradesh

Bishop Yeddu Muthyalu (Yeddy Muthyalu) (died 1954) was the first Bishop - in - Krishna-Godavari Diocese of the Church of South India who was consecrated in 1947 at the St. George's Cathedral, Chennai along with thirteen other Bishops.

== Anglican Diocese of Dornakal ==
After initial studies at the Dornakal Divinity School, Muthyalu was ordained in 1924 and became a Priest of the Diocese of Dornakal whose geographical precincts were wide. In 1929, Muthyalu had a short stint as Tutor at his alma mater after which he again took up the role as Priest. In 1940, Muthyalu became Honorary Canon of the Epiphany Cathedral in Dornakal a position which he held until 1945 when he was consecrated as Assistant Bishop in Dornakal.

== CSI Diocese of Krishna-Godavari ==
When the Church of South India was formed in 1947, the Diocese of Dornakal was considerably reduced as three new diocese were erected - the Dioceses of Nandyal, Krishna-Godavari, and Rayalaseema. The Church of South India Synod consecrated Muthyalu in 1947 at St. George's Cathedral, Chennai as the first Bishop - in - Krishna Godavari. Muthyalu occupied the Cathedra in Eluru.

== Death ==
In 1954, when Muthyalu died suddenly, the Church of South India Synod confabulated and sent A. B. Elliott of the adjoining Diocese of Dornakal to succeed Muthyalu.

Rajaiah David Paul who authored The First Decade: An Account of the Church of South India wrote the following lines about the early life of Yeddu Muthyalu,

The Right Reverend Yeddu Muthyalu was the son of a soldier. His entry into the Church as a little child was typical of the man. Shortly after his father's death, his mother came under the influence of the missionaries in Masulipatnam and in spite of much persecution, decided to be baptized. Her little son with equal determination threw in his lot with his mother, and neither blows nor threats would keep him from becoming a Christian with her.

Religious titles
Preceded by A. B. Elliott; 1935-1945	Assistant Bishop - in - Diocese of Dornakal; 1945-1947	Succeeded by Post disbanded
Preceded by Post created	Bishop - in - Diocese of Krishna-Godavari; Church of South India; 1947-1954	Succeeded by A. B. Elliott; 1955-1959
