= Anthony Blacker Elliott =

Irish bishop (1887–1980)

Bishop Anthony Blacker Elliott, CSI Assistant Bishop - in - Dornakal (1935-1945) Bishop – in – Dornakal (1945-1955) Bishop - in - Krishna-Godavari (1955-1959)
- The Right Reverend
- Church: Church of South India (A Uniting church comprising Wesleyan Methodist, Congregational, Calvinist, Presbyterian and Anglican missionary societies – ABCFM, Dutch Reformed Church, SPG, WMMS, LMS, Basel Mission, CMS, and the Church of England)
- In office: 1935-1945 as Assistant Bishop - in - Dornakal; 1945-1955 as Bishop - in - Dornakal; 1955-1959 as Bishop - in - Krishna-Godavari
- Predecessor: Post created (as Assistant Bishop); V. S. Azariah, CSI (as Bishop - in - Dornakal); Y. Muthyalu, CSI (as Bishop - in - Krishna-Godavari)
- Successor: Y. Muthyalu, CSI (as Assistant Bishop); P. Solomon, CSI (as Bishop - in - Dornakal); N. D. Anandarao Samuel, CSI (as Bishop - in - Krishna-Godavari)
- Previous posts: Pastor, Dornakal (1913-1925); Tutor, Dornakal Divinity School, Dornakal (1925-1935)

Orders
- Ordination: by Church Missionary Society (CMS)
- Consecration: 27 January 1935 as Assistant Bishop; 1945 as Bishop
- Rank: Bishop

Personal details
- Born: 1887 Ireland
- Died: 19 December 1980 (aged 93) Alair
- Buried: CSI-Epiphany Cathedral Compound, Dornakal
- Denomination: Christianity
- Education: Trinity College Dublin (B. D.)

Bishop A. B. Elliott (1887 – 19 December 1970) was the second Bishop - in - Dornakal Diocese of the Church of South India succeeding V. S. Azariah as well as the second Bishop - in - Diocese of Krishna-Godavari. Elliott lived the life of a Catholic priest and never got married even though the institution of marriage was optional in the Anglican Church. From the time he came to Dornakal in 1913, Elliott remained serving the cause of the Church until his death, aged 83.

Anthony Blacker Elliott studied at the Trinity College Dublin, taking a Bachelor of Divinity degree in 1912 and came to India as a missionary of the Church Missionary Society in 1913 soon after the erection of the Diocese of Dornakal. After nearly two decades of episcopal ministry, he was made Assistant Bishop - in - Dornakal in 1935 and elevated as bishop in 1945, the year in which Bishop V. S. Azariah died. From 1945 to 1955, Eliott occupied the Cathedra at the Ephiphany Cathedral, Dornakal until his transfer in 1955 to the adjoining Diocese of Krishna-Godavari.

Elliott moved to Eluru in 1955 following his transfer by the Church of South India Synod to the Diocese of Krishna-Godavari to fill the sede vacante caused by the sudden death of Bishop Y. Muthyalu. Elliott was installed as Bishop on 26 October 1955.

The Church of South India Synod appointed P. Solomon as Bishop - in - Dornakal in the place of Elliott. As Bishop-in-Krishna Godavari, Elliott was in the office of the Bishop from 1956 until his retirement in September 1959 following which N. D. Ananda Rao Samuel was appointed in 1961 to succeed Elliott.

Elliott moved to Alair, Warangal District, where he remained until his death on 19 December 1970 and was buried in the courtyard of the CSI-Epiphany Cathedral in Dornakal.

Religious titles
Preceded by Post created	Anglican Church in India; Assistant Bishop - in - Diocese of Dornakal; 1935-1945	Succeeded by Y. Muthyalu, CSI
Preceded by V. S. Azariah, CSI; 1912-1945	Church of South India; Bishop - in - Diocese of Dornakal; 1945-1955	Succeeded by P. Solomon, CSI; 1945-1955
Preceded by Y. Muthyalu, CSI; 1947-1954	Church of South India; Bishop - in - Diocese of Krishna-Godavari; Church of South India; 1956-1959	Succeeded by N. D. Ananda Rao Samuel, CSI; 1961-1980
