= Indian Missionary Society =

Catholic religious congregation in India

- Abbreviation: IMS
- Formation: 1941; 85 years ago
- Founder: Fr. Gasper Arsenius Pinto, I.M.S.
- Founded at: Varanasi
- Type: Clerical Religious Congregation of Pontifical Right (for Men)
- Legal status: Active
- Headquarters: Chaitanya-Cristnagar P.O., Varanasi-221003, U.P., India
- Members: 308 members (216 priests) (2017)
- Superior General: Fr. Walter Francis Standley, I.M.S.
- Website: ims.org.in

The Indian Missionary Society is a Catholic religious congregation. It is located in Varanasi, Uttar Pradesh, India.

== History ==
It was founded on 3 November 1941 by Fr. Gaspar A Pinto.

Fr. Gaspar stayed in a rented house in Maldahiya, Varanasi, when he arrived in India. In 1943 he bought a plot of land outside the city and named it Christnagar. He laid the foundation of the Mother House of the IMS in Christnagar. Bishop Angelo Poli of Allahabad canonically erected it as a Society of Indigenous Priests on 13 March 1945. In 1953 Msgr. Jos A. E. Fernandez was appointed first Superior General of the society. The Generalate (head office) of the IMS is in Varanasi. It is spread across almost 5 regions.

== Present ==
The Congregation is spread across 5 regions and undertakes preaching and missionary work in the rural areas of India. The society at present has 218 religious priests who take care of 65 parishes.

== List of Superiors ==
Name	Position	Tenure
Fr. Francis E. Lonakutty (Prasen Raj IMS)	Superior General	2022- present
Fr. Walter Francis Standley	Superior General	2019 - 2022
Fr. Paul Mahendra	Superior General	2012 - 2019
Fr. Jose Subhash	Superior General	2007 - 2012
Fr. Joseph Satyanand	Superior General	1995 - 2007
Fr. Joseph Dilasa	Superior General	1983 - 1995
Fr. Prabhu Prasad	Superior General	1971 - 1983
Msgr. Jos A. E. Fernandez	Superior General	1953 - 1971
Fr. Gasper Arsenius Pinto	Founder	1941
