= Udangudi =

- Panchayat town
- Location in Tamil Nadu, India Udangudi (India)
- Coordinates: 8.4333°N 78.0167°E
- Country: India
- State: Tamil Nadu
- District: Thoothukudi

Area
  - Total: 11.23 km^{2} (4.34 sq mi)

Population (2011)
  - Total: 19,738
  - Density: 1,758/km^{2} (4,552/sq mi)

Languages
  - Official: Tamil
- Time zone: UTC+5:30 (IST)
- PIN: 628203
- Telephone code: 04639
- Vehicle registration: TN 69, TN 92

Udangudi is a Panchayat town in Thoothukudi district in the Indian state of Tamil Nadu.

== Demographics ==
As of 2011 India census, Udangudi had a population of 19,738. Males constitute 49.92% of the population and females 50.07%. Udangudi has an average literacy rate of 93.18%, very much higher than the state average of 80.09%: male literacy is 95.08%, and female literacy is 91.30%.

Udangudi in British rule had railway line connected to Tiruchendur. This railway line was laid primarily to take advantage of collecting the Palm Juice extraction going around Udangudi and British established a Jaggery Factory near Kulasekaran pattinam for export market. Unfortunately, the factory became non-operational which resulted in non-usage of this railway line.

The town is an example of peaceful co-existence with population of Muslims, Christians and Hindus distributed in equal proportions and the entire people live in harmony.

T.D.T.A.Higher Secondary School is the oldest school for boys, Mary Ann Best Higher Secondary School for girls from which most people got educated and One more School Sri. Ramakrishna Chidhambareshwarer. Hr.Sec.School (Sri.R.K.C) is also there and there is most famous schools are there like St. Antony's RC Middle School, Saiva Prakasa Vidyasalai School, Anitha Kumaran Matric. Higher Secondary School. Najath School and Salma School etc.

Religious census
| Religion | Percent(%) |
| Hindu | 41.9% |
| Muslim | 39.1% |
| Christian | 20.07% |

== Centre for Karuppatti ==
Years back Udangudi and its suburbs had a lot of Palmyrah groves, where the main occupation was to extract Palm Juice and prepare Karuppukatti or KarpagaKatti (Palm Jaggery, presumably karuppukatti is a transformed form for "Karumbukatti" sugar(cane)piece). More than a century back this centre was the place which catered to the Palm Jaggery requirements to the demands of South India and also Palm Jaggery requirements to several other countries where it was exported.

== Origin of name ==
Here the Hindu (Ayya worship, Nattar worship, Saiva worship), Muslim and Christian people live together in equal numbers and in unity, so the name "Udangudi" came to be. The name 'Udangudi' is also believed to have originated from the abundance of 'Udaimaram' (trees) in the village.

== Economy ==
=== BHEL power plant ===
2x660 MW, Stage-I LOA issued to M/s BHEL for Design, Engineering, Manufacture, Supply, erection, testing and commissioning of complete 2x660MW coal based Supercritical thermal power project, Udangudi Stage I, on Engineering, Procurement and Construction basis for a value of Rs.7359 crores on 7.12.17.

Udangudi Power Plant has started its test run in 2025.
