= Kistaram =

- town
- Location in Chhattisgarh, India Kistaram (India)
- Coordinates: 18°1′0″N 81°2′0″E
- Country: India
- State: Chhattisgarh
- District: Sukma
- Elevation: 119 m (390 ft)

Languages
  - Official: Telugu
- Time zone: UTC+5:30 (IST)
- Vehicle registration: TS
- Coastline: 0 kilometres (0 mi)
- Website: chhattisgarh.gov.in

Kistaram is a town in Sukma district, Chhattisgarh, India.

== Geography ==
It is located at 18°1′0″N 81°2′0″E at an elevation of 107 m (354 ft) above MSL.

== Location ==
Kistaram is 80 km from Sukma. Nearest airport is Hyderabad Airport.
