= Pereji Solomon =

- Bishop – in – Dornakal (1956-1979)
- Church: Christian
- Diocese: Dornakal
- See: Church of South India
- In office: 1956-1979
- Predecessor: A. B. Elliott
- Successor: G. S. Luke
- Previous post(s): Pastor, Diocese of Dornakal(1940-1956); Missionary, British Isles(1956)

Orders
- Ordination: 1947, Medak by Frank Whittaker, Bishop-in-Medak
- Consecration: 27 November 1956 by H. Sumitra, Moderator, Church of South India Synod and J. E. L. Newbigin, Deputy Moderator, Church of South India Synod

Personal details
- Born: 3 June 1910; Ganneruvaram, Karimnagar District
- Died: 21 August 2002 (aged 92); Paloncha
- Buried: Epiphany Cathedral Compound, Dornakal

Bishop P. Solomon (3 June 1910 – 21 August 2002) was the third Bishop-in-Dornakal Diocese of the Church of South India who succeeded A. B. Elliott. Ever since Solomon chose the vocation of Priesthood, he maintained celibacy and served the Church throughout his life.

Solomon had his spiritual formation at the United Theological College, Bangalore where he studied from 1936 to 1940 for the graduate course leading to Bachelor of Divinity awarded by the Senate of Serampore College (University), India's first {a university under Section 2 (f) of the University Grants Commission Act, 1956} with degree-granting authority validated by a Danish Charter and ratified by the Government of West Bengal.

After Solomon's return from Bangalore, he was ordained in 1947 by Frank Whittaker in Medak. In 1956 Solomon was a missionary in Swindon and to the British Isles.

Rajaiah David Paul writes that while Solomon out of the country, he was elected bishop. Solomon was consecrated on 27 November 1956 as the third Bishop-in-Dornakal by H. Sumitra, Moderator and J. E. L. Newbigin, Deputy Moderator of the Church of South India Synod at the CSI-Epiphany Cathedral in Dornakal. Solomon led the bishopric of Dornakal from 1956 to 1979. The Diocese of Dornakal was split in 1978, resulting in the creation of the Diocese of Karimnagar. M. Edwin Rao, who compiled a centennial edition of the Diocese of Dornakal, writes that Solomon attended ecclesiastical conclaves the world over,

- 1956, World Methodist Conference, United States of America,
- 1956, Audience with Eisenhower along with other delegates attending World Methodist Conference,
- 1965, the Second Vatican Council convened by Pope Paul VI and also had an audience with the in Rome and again in Bombay,
- 1968, the tenth Lambeth Conference presided by Michael Ramsey, the Archbishop of Canterbury.
- 1961, World Methodist Conference, Oslo,
- 1965, Guest of honour of Patriarch of Syriac Orthodox Church, Damascus,
- 1967, British Methodist Missionary Society consultation, Manchester
- 1967, Congress on Evangelism by Billy Graham,
- 1967, East Asia Christian Council, Bangkok,
- 1968, the fourth assembly of the World Council of Churches held at Uppsala,
- 1969, Consultation on Church Union in Kenya-East Africa,
- 1969, Audience with the Emperor of Ethiopia at Addis Ababa,
- 1969, Audience with the Patriarch of Coptic Church in Addis Ababa,

Religious titles
Preceded by A. B. Elliott; 1945-1955	Bishop - in - Diocese of Dornakal; Church of South India; 1956-1979	Succeeded by G. S. Luke; 1980-1985
Preceded by Augustine Gnanadasan Jebaraj; 1962-1964	Deputy Moderator, Church of South India Synod; 1964-1966	Succeeded by J. E. L. Newbigin; 1966-1972
Preceded by Arnold Legg; 1962-1966	Moderator, Church of South India Synod; 1966-1972	Succeeded by I. R. H. Gnanadason; 1972
Honorary titles
Preceded by A. B. Elliott; 1945-1956	Chairperson; Andhra Union Theological College, Dornakal; 1956-1964	Succeeded by Post disbanded
Preceded by Position created	Chairperson, Board of Governors; Andhra Christian Theological College, Rajahmundry/Hyderabad; 1964-1971	Succeeded by K. C. George, STBC; 1971-1973
Preceded by Position created	Member, Board of Governors; Andhra Christian Theological College, Rajahmundry/Hyderabad; 1964-1979	Succeeded by G. S. Luke; 1980-1985
