= Vedanayagam Samuel Azariah =

Indian evangelist and Anglican bishop

Dalit Nayak Vedanayagam Samuel Azariah, CoE, LL. D. Honoris causa (Cantab.) Bishop in Dornakal (1912-1945)
- The Right Reverend
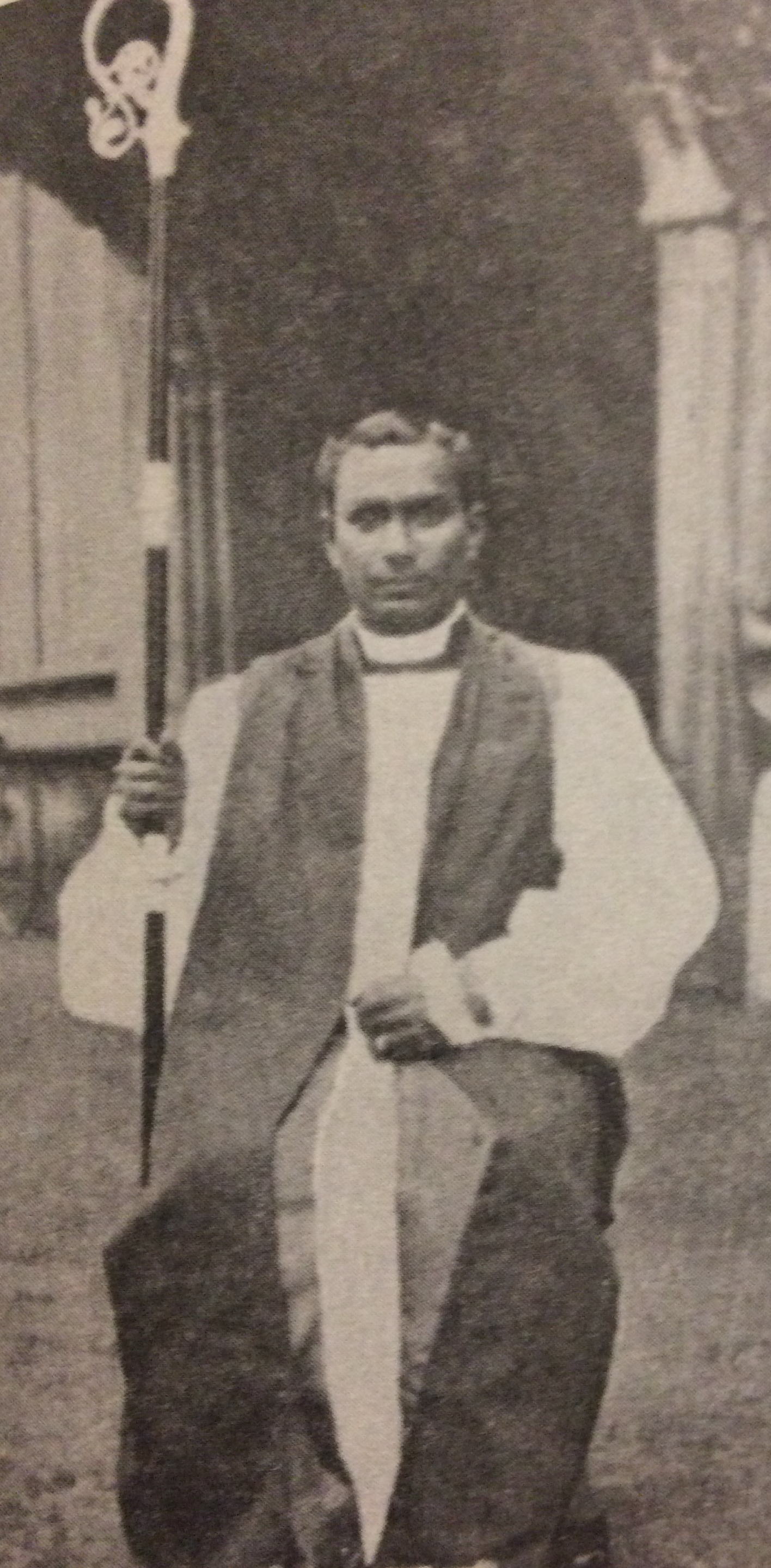
- Church: Church of England in India
- Diocese: Dornakal
- In office: 1912 to 1945
- Predecessor: Position created
- Successor: A. B. Elliott, CSI
- Previous posts: Team Member, Young Men's Christian Association (YMCA)

Orders
- Ordination: 1909
- Consecration: 29 December 1912, St. Paul's Cathedral, Calcutta (Bengal Presidency)
- Rank: Bishop

Personal details
- Born: Vedanayagam Samuel Azariah; 17 August 1874 Vellalanvilai, Madras Presidency (British Raj)
- Died: 1 January 1945 (aged 70) Dornakal, Hyderabad state
- Buried: Epiphany Cathedral Compound, Dornakal
- Denomination: Christianity
- Education: Madras Christian College, Tambaram

Sainthood
- Feast day: 2 January
- Venerated in: Anglican Communion

Bishop Vedanayagam Samuel Azariah (17 August 1874 – 1 January 1945) (also transliterated as Vedanayakam Samuel Azariah) was an Indian evangelist and the first Indian bishop in the churches of the Anglican Communion, serving as the first bishop of the diocese of Dornakal. A pioneer of Christian ecumenism in India, Azariah had a complex relationship with Mahatma Gandhi, who at least once called him postcolonial Indians' "Enemy Number One."

== Early and family life ==
Vedanayakam Samuel Azariah was born in 1874 in the village of Vellalanvilai, Thoothukudi District, Tamil Nadu, in the far south of India to Anglican priest Thomas Vedanayagam, and his second wife Ellen. His family was previously traditionally orthodox Hindu and dedicated to the god Shiva (hence the Tamil family name Vedanayakam possibly reflecting Shiva's three-pronged spear or one of many names of his son Murugan). Thomas had converted to Christianity in 1839 while at a Church Missionary Society school. He named his son Samuel after the Old Testament prophet, because of the 13-year gap after the couple had a daughter.

Thomas died in 1889, but Samuel was brought up by his devout mother, who sent him at age 10 to be educated at Christian missionary boarding schools including the one at Megnanapuram run by his half-brother Ambrose, as she became the matron of the related girls' school. At the school in Tirunelveli (called Tinnevelly during British rule), Azariah helped found a society to overcome caste differences, not a popular position with his caste but which foreshadowed later developments in his career.

Samuel Vedanayakam was then sent to the provincial capital, Chennai (then known as Madras), where the British principal of Madras Christian College gave him the name Azariah to distinguish him from other boys. There, his classmates included K.T. Paul (1876-1931), with whom Azariah would later work. He also came into contact with American missionary Sherwood Eddy, who also became a lifelong friend. Azariah studied mathematics like one of his elder brothers who also became a missionary, but he never received a degree; he completed his coursework in 1893 but fell ill shortly before his final mathematics exam and later chose not to retake it. Later, Azariah would criticize those who flaunted their degrees without becoming B.A. (meaning Born Again).

Instead, Azariah became an evangelist with the nondenominational Young Men's Christian Association (YMCA) at age 19. By 1895, he led YMCA spiritual meetings and directed the opening of a new branch in Madras. In 1896 he met the evangelist John Mott who noted his enthusiasm favorably. In 1902 Azariah traveled to Jaffna in Sri Lanka to evangelize among the Tamils, which caused him to reevaluate the relatively prosperous Tinnevelly church's position concerning evangelization. The following year Azariah revitalized a long-dormant proposal and thus helped form the Indian Missionary Society (IMS) (based in Tinnevelly), whereby fellow Tamil Christians could evangelize among their brethren.

Azariah also served as secretary of the YMCA in south India from 1895 to 1909, and remained convinced of the importance of indigenization in the Christian mission. On Christmas Day, 1905, in Carey's library at Serampore in West Bengal, the interdenominational National Missionary Society was founded, with Azariah as its secretary and a mission to evangelize not only in India, but also in Afghanistan, Tibet, and Nepal. Other prominent individuals among the 17 founders included K.T. Paul, J.W.N. Hensman, Savarirayan Jesudasan and Ernest Forrester Paton. Furthermore, in 1907, Azariah attended the World Student Christian Federation Conference in Tokyo and the YMCA conference in Shanghai, and remained interested in evangelizing strategies for Japan and China, as well as India. He focused on a pan-Asian global vision and converting Asians, rather than nationalists' call to free Asia from Western domination.

In 1898, Azariah married Ambu Mariammal Samuel, one of the first Christian women in South India to take a college course, whom he described as "the most spiritually minded girl in Tirunelveli." Their marriage broke or reinterpreted several native religious traditions, since the bride and groom corresponded with each other before marriage, disregarded dowry customs, set a mere 40 rupee budget for the ceremony, and married on a Wednesday. The couple eventually had four sons (George, Henry, Edwin, and Ambrose) and two daughters (Grace and Mercy).

== Ministry ==
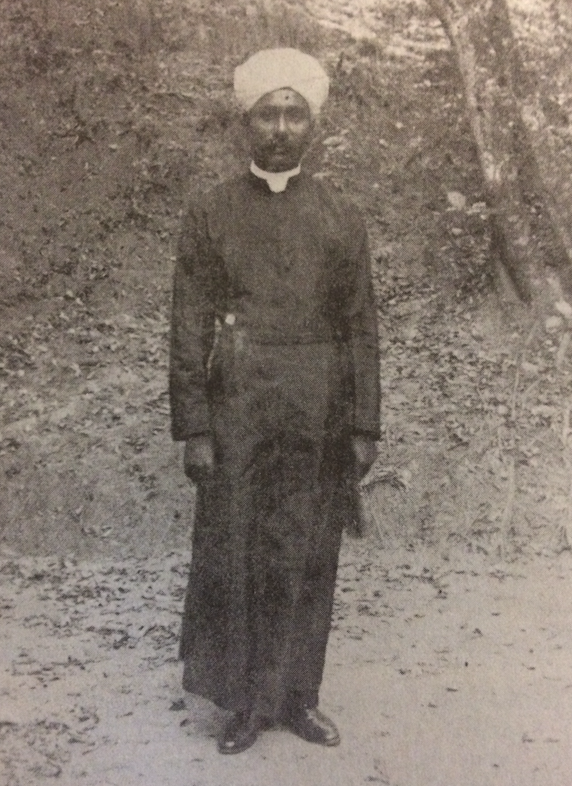
Azariah wearing a clergy cassock and turban.

In 1909, at age 35, Azariah was ordained as an Anglican priest, left his positions with the YMCA, learned Telugu and began as a missionary in Dornakal. That mission has been started by the Indian Missionary Society of Tinnevelly, and Rev. Azariah continued to speak widely on the need for indigenisation, including at the 1910 World Missionary Conference at Edinburgh.

On 29 December 1912, after three years as a priest, Azariah was consecrated the first Bishop of the new Diocese of Dornakal in St. Paul's Cathedral, Calcutta. Missionary Dr. J. R. Mott, present on the occasion, called it one of the most impressive ceremonies he ever witnessed. Eleven Bishops of the Province of India took part in the act of Consecration, which made Rt. Rev. Azariah the first Indian to be consecrated a Bishop of the Anglican Communion. Indians from all parts, and especially from the new Bishop's own country of Tinnevelly, attended in large numbers to honour their distinguished brother. Canon Edward Sell's sermon on that occasion was soon published and remains available.

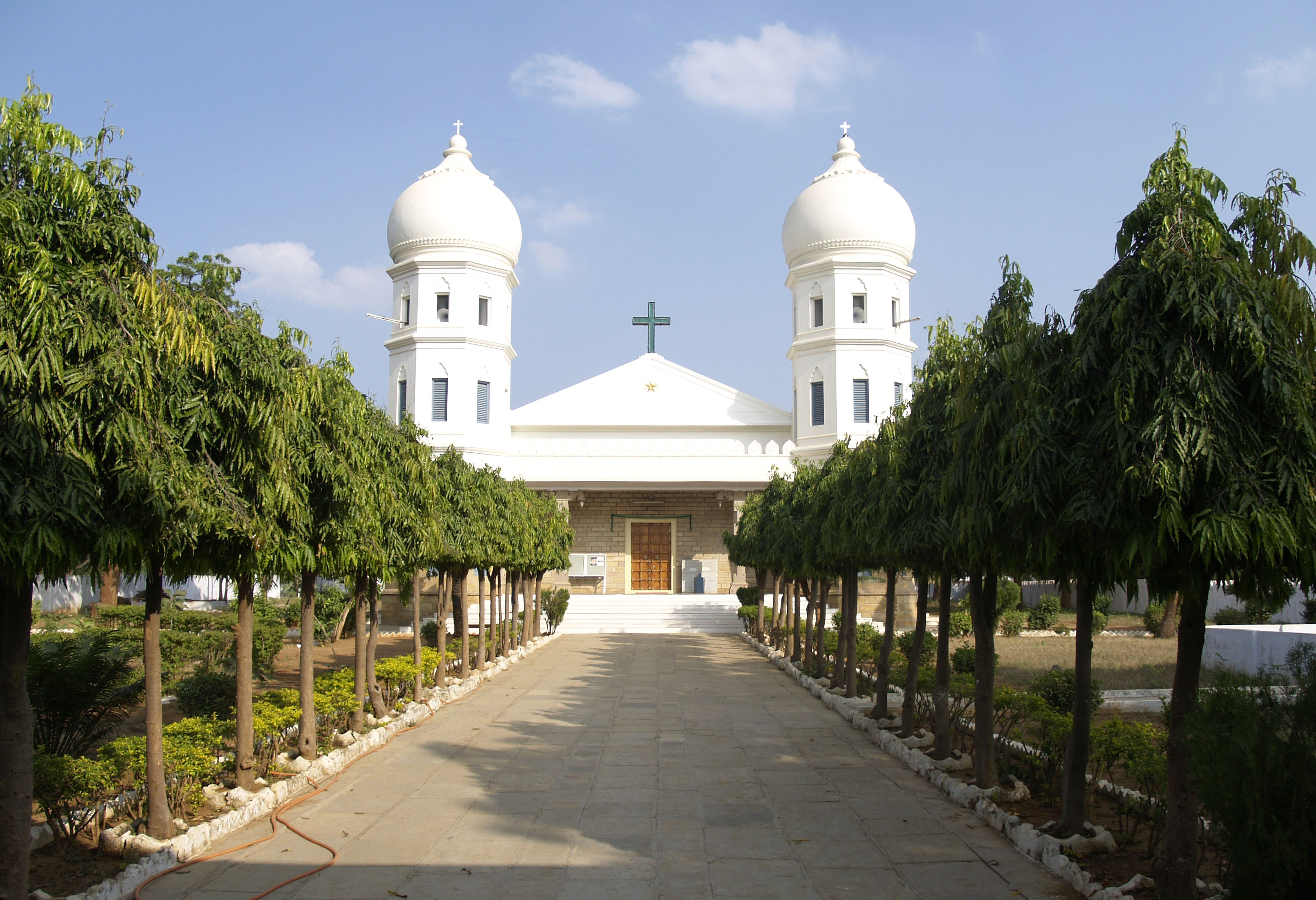
Epiphany Cathedral, Dornakal, visioned and built by Rt. Rev. V. S. Azariah

The Diocese of Dornakal, initially small, grew during Bishop Azariah's episcopate. Initially comprising the south-east corner of the Nizam's Dominions in Hyderabad, it soon added the District of Dummagudem, where the Church Missionary Society (CMS) worked. In 1920, the Episcopal Synod resolved that all the areas in which either the low-church CMS or the high church Society for the Propagation of the Gospel (SPG) evangelized in the Telugu country would become part of this diocese, transforming it into one of the largest (in terms of numbers of Christians) in India. Thus were added the watersheds of the Kistna and Godavery rivers; parts of the Kurnool and Cuddapah districts evangelized by the SPG, as well as the areas in the Hyderabad State served by missionaries of the Indian Missionary Society of Tinnevelly, the Singareni Mission, the Khammamett Mission (formerly under the Church Missionary Society), and the newly formed Dornakal Diocesan Mission (to the Mulag Taluq). Soon, the new bishop started raising funds and designing a cathedral to reflect his dioceses' multiple ethnic and cultural traditions (merging Muslim, Hindu and Christian architectural elements), which was finally completed and consecrated in 1936 as Epiphany Cathedral.

Bishop Azariah lived for a time in a tent near his new cathedral, but spent most of his episcopate traveling across his vast diocese by bullock cart or bicycle, usually accompanied by his wife and coworker, Anbu. His village sermons often attacked "the four demons - Dirt, Disease, Debt, and Drink." He proved the most successful leader of grassroots conversions to Christianity in South Asia during the early twentieth century. Known by the affectionate honorific Thandrigaru ("father"), Azariah inspired mass movements that brought roughly 200,000 outcast Malas and Madigas, tribals and low-caste non-Brahmins into his fledgling church. He also established a school to educate girls, later renamed for him. By 1924, the Diocese of Dornakal had eight English-born priests and 53 Indian clergy. By 1935, his diocese had 250 ordained Indian clergy and over 2,000 village teachers, plus medical clinics, cooperative societies, and printing presses.

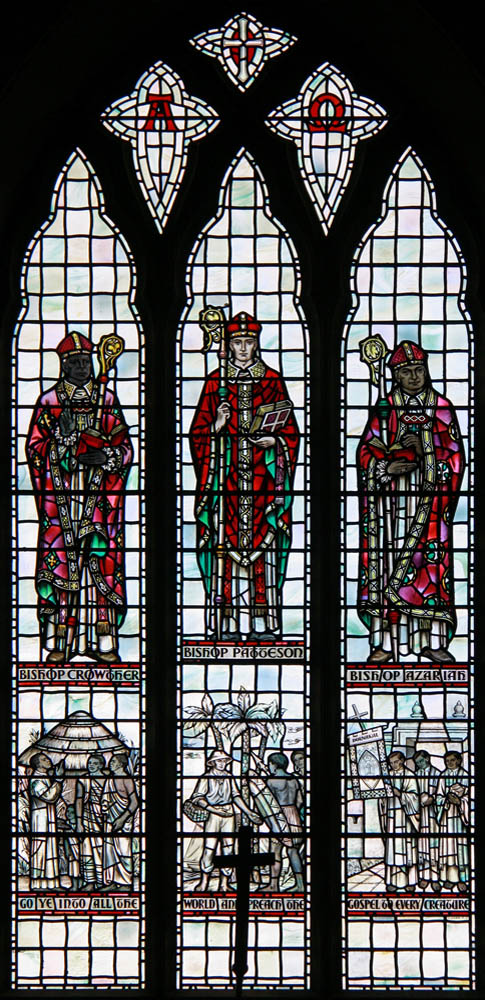
Stained glass window in St Mark's Church, Bromley, with Azariah on the right

The bishop became both an ally and leading foe of M.K. Gandhi during battles over communal representation and religious freedom. While also an Indian nationalist, Azariah believed Hinduism inherently repressive and grounded in a destructive caste system. On the other hand, Gandhi saw conversions to Christianity as a threat.

Bishop Azariah also believed the Church's mission should express its unity, and thus continued to take a leading role in negotiating to reunite Protestant Christian missions in India. For many years Azariah served as chairman of the National Christian Council of India, Burma and Ceylon.

Rt. Rev. Azariah became the first, and remained the only native Indian bishop of an Anglican diocese from 1912 until his death in 1945. In 1920, Cambridge University awarded him an honorary degree. As both an effective evangelist to Indian villagers and a respected bishop in the British church hierarchy, Azariah provided a unique bridge between ordinary Indians and British elites during the late phase of their imperial associations. He was especially popular in rural Andhra Pradesh, where he was known by the epithet "Dalit Nayak" (Leader of outcastes). He was an esteemed builder of Protestant unification within India, and a pioneer of the ecumenical movement globally.

With Bishop Henry Whitehead, Bishop Vedanayagam Azariah wrote Christ in the Indian Villages (1930). The previous year, he published two articles in the "International Review of Missions". In 1936 V.S. Azariah published India and the Christian Movement and South India Union: an Examination of the Scheme from the Anglican Point of View as well as The Church and Evangelism: Being Studies on the Evangelization of India Based on Early Church History. His most popular book, Christian Giving (1940), was subsequently translated into more than 15 languages, although not yet freely available online. Azariah also wrote articles on Christian mission, such as 'The Necessity of Christian Unity for the missionary enterprise of the world' and 'The Expansion of Christianity', as well as published a number of works in his native Tamil as well as Telugu.

== Death and legacy ==
Bishop Azariah died on 1 January 1945 in Dornakal. At the time of his death, Dornakal was a diocese with 200,000 members. Two years later, one of his dreams was realized, and a united Church of South India was formed, for the first time unifying an episcopal church (Anglican) with non-episcopal churches (Congregational, Presbyterian, Methodist) since the Reformation.

The diocese's only college, Bishop Azariah College in Dornakal, is also named for him and educated both Christians and non-Christians. The girls' school which he established was also renamed in his honor. The secondary school in his native Vellalanvilai is also now named in his honor.

There is a memorial window to Bishop Azariah in St Mark's Church, Bromley, south-east London, where he is accompanied by Bishops Samuel Ajayi Crowther and John Patteson.

Vedanayagam is remembered in the Church of England with a commemoration on 2 January.
