= Gnanasigamony Devakadasham =

Indian Anglican bishop

Gnanasigamony Devakadasham is a Former Bishop of Kanyakumari of the Church of South India (CSI) in 2001.

Devakadasham joined the Church of South India fold on September 5, 1972, and was ordained as a priest on January 11, 1981. He became the 5th bishop of the Kanyakumari Diocese in 2001 and He was elected as Deputy Moderator of the CSI Synod on 14 January 2010. Devakadasham was also the Moderator of the CSI Synod from 2010 to 2012.
