= Dornakal =

- Census Town
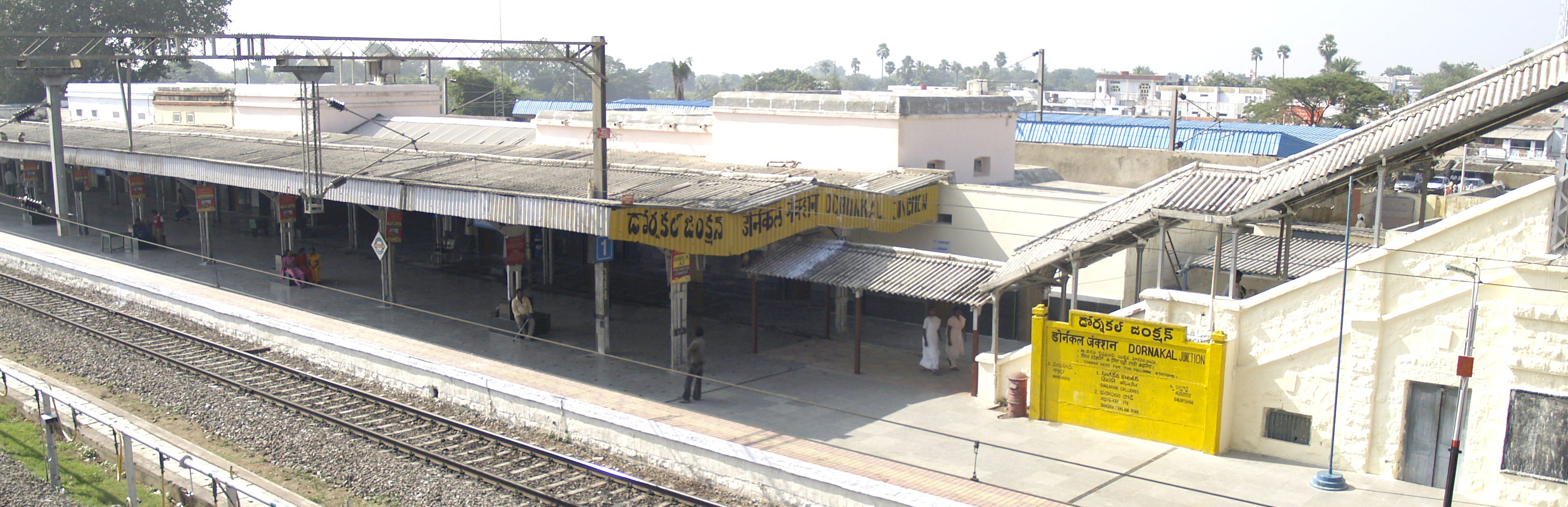
- Dornakal Junction Railway Station

- Location in Telangana, India Dornakal (India)
- Coordinates: 17.447°N 80.151°E
- Country: India
- State: Telangana
- District: Mahabubabad (New)
- Mandal: Dornakal

Government
  - Type: Municipal corporation
  - Body: Nagar Palika
- Elevation: 528 m (1,732 ft)

Population
  - Total: 14,426

Languages
  - Official: Telugu
- Time zone: UTC+5:30 (IST)
- PIN: 506381
- Telephone code: 087192
- Vehicle registration: TS 26

Dornakal is one of the largest towns in Mahabubabad district of Telangana, India. The town is important as a Railway Junction where a branch line emanates to Manuguru and Bhadrachalam Road and is also on the Vijayawada - Warangal - Secunderabad/Peddapalli mainline in South India.

== History ==
Like the names of many villages of India, the name Dornakal has some geographic significance. The word Dornakal means "a group of stones" and this meaning is applicable to the immediate locality. The word "stone," or its equivalent, is used in more than a dozen forms in the naming of the villages of the Deccan plateau. Dornakal is located on the slopes of a rock region thru which a small river flows. The stream has its source about 40 miles (64 km) north of the village. It is the overflow of a big "natural tank" or lake, which has an area of 24 sq mi (62 km^{2}).

Dornakal proper was founded some hundreds of years ago, but the new Dornakal and its extension came into prominence in the late 1800s (around 1890) with the advent of the railway and the mission. Dornakal was located in a forested region where tigers were quite common. The main factors in the expansion of the town is due to its position on the main railway route to important towns; the timber of the forests; the resources of coal fields near the village; and the activities of a Christian mission, with its school for vocational training.

Dornakal is in the tropical zone about 400 miles (640 km) south of the Tropic of Cancer. Its altitude is less than 1,000 feet (300 m) above sea level, and it is about 150 miles (240 km) from the sea. Dornakal has a typical tropical weather, with the maximum temperatures in summer ranging between 43 and 46 °C (109 and 115 °F) and the maximum winter temperatures ranging between 31 and 32 °C (88 and 90 °F) and the coldest nights in December have temperatures between 10 and 15 °C (50 and 59 °F).

== Church of South India ==
Dornakal is the Headquarters for the Diocese of Dornakal of the Church of South India and is one of the 24 dioceses of the Church of South India. It is one of the three dioceses of the Church in the state of Telangana, the other five being Karimnagar Diocese, Medak Diocese. Epiphany Cathedral is the second biggest church in the two Telugu states (Andhra Pradesh and Telangana) after the Church in Medak.

== Transport ==
The state-run TSRTC runs buses to connect to all parts of the state.

The Indian Railways is planning a high-speed link passing through Hyderabad–Dornakal–Vijayawada–Chennai. Dornakal Junction is one of the biggest railway stations in South Central Railway with continuous arrivals and departures of passenger, express and superfast trains through day and night.
