= Morley (name) =

Morley is both a surname and a given name. The name is toponymic, derived from several places in the United Kingdom —from the Old English words "mor" ("marsh"), and "le-ah" ("a clearing in the woods"). Notable people with the name include:

== Surname ==
- Aaron Morley (born 2000), English footballer
- Ada McPherson Morley (1852–1917), American suffragist and activist
- Adrian Morley (born 1977), English rugby league footballer
- Angela Morley (1924–2009), English composer and conductor
- Beric Morley (1943–2015), British architectural historian
- Bert Morley (1882–1957), English international footballer
- Bill Morley (baseball) (1890–1985), Major League Baseball second baseman
- Bill Morley (1876–1932), American football player
- Clarence Morley (1869–1948), American politician, 24th governor of Colorado, member of the Ku Klux Klan
- Christopher Morley (1890–1957), American writer and editor
- Christopher Morley (actor) (1951–2023), American actor
- Dave Morley (born 1977), English footballer
- David Morley (disambiguation)
- Ebenezer Cobb Morley (1831–1924), Football Association pioneer
- Edith Morley (1875–1964), English literary scholar
- Edward W. Morley (1838–1923), American scientist
- Elizabeth Morley, 18th-century English silversmith
- Elliot Morley (born 1952), English politician
- Eric Morley (1918–2000), British founder of the Miss World pageant
- Fenton Morley (1912–1995), English Dean of Salisbury
- Felix Morley (1894–1982), American journalist
- Frank Morley (1860–1937), British-born American mathematician
- Frank Vigor Morley (1899–1980), American mathematician, son of Frank
- Fred Morley (1850–1884), British cricketer
- Fred Morley (footballer) (1888–1970) in England and American Soccer League
- Frederick Morley (organist) (1850–1929) in Sydney, Australia
- George Morley (bishop) (1598–1684), English Anglican bishop
- Harry Morley (1881–1943), British artist
- Henry Morley (1822–1894), British writer
- Henry Morley (cricketer) (1785–1857), English cricketer
- Isaac Morley (1786–1865), American early member of the Latter Day Saints
- Iain Morley (born 1965), British barrister and Resident Judge of Saint Kitts and Nevis
- Ivan Morley (born 1966), American painter
- Jack Morley (1909–1972), Welsh rugby player
- Jefferson Morley (born 1958), American journalist and author
- John Morley, 1st Viscount Morley of Blackburn (1838–1923), Secretary of State for India
- John David Morley (1948–2018), English novelist
- Karen Morley (1909–2003), American actor and political activist
- Lawrence Morley (1920–2013), Canadian geophysicist
- Lewis Morley (1925–2013), English photographer
- Luke Morley (born 1960), English musician
- Malcolm Morley (artist) (1931–2018), British-American artist
- Michael D. Morley (1930–2020), American mathematician
- Nathan Morley (born 1974), British television journalist and host
- P. J. Morley (1931–2012), Irish politician
- Pat Morley (footballer) (born 1965), Irish footballer
- Pat Morley, drummer for Soul Asylum from 1983 to 1984
- Paul Morley (born 1957), British journalist of the music scene
- Peter Morley (filmmaker) (1924–2016), German-born British documentary filmmaker
- Robert Morley (1908–1992), British actor
- Ruth Morley (1925–1991), Austrian-born American costume designer
- Sam Morley (1932–2014), American football player
- Samuel Morley (disambiguation)
- Sean Morley (born 1971), Canadian wrestler
- Steve Morley (born 1981), Canadian football player
- Sylvanus Morley (1883–1948), American archaeologist
- Thomas Morley (1557 or 1558 – 1602), English composer
- Tony Morley (born 1954), English footballer
- Trevor Morley (born 1961), English footballer
- William Morley (disambiguation)

== Given name ==
- Morley Cowles Ballantine (1925–2009), American editor
- Morley Baer (1916–1995), American artist, photographer and teacher
- Morley Callaghan (1903–1990), Canadian novelist, short story writer, playwright and broadcaster
- Morley Griswold (1890–1951), American politician, 16th governor of Nevada
- Morley Kamen, also known as Morley (singer), American singer-songwriter
- Morley Muse, renewable energy engineer
- Morley Safer (1931–2016), Canadian news reporter
- Morley Shih (born 1950), Taiwanese lawyer
- Morley Robertson (モーリー・ロバートソン), American-Japanese television personality
- Morley E. Wilson (1881–1965), Canadian geologist

== See also ==
- Maury (name)
