= Diocese of Tirunelveli of the Church of South India =

Diocese of the Church of South India in Tamil Nadu, India

Diocese of Tirunelveli

Location
- Country: India
- Ecclesiastical province: Church of South India

Statistics
- Congregations: 770 in 2025
- Members: 1.80,202 in 2025

Information
- Established: 1859
- Cathedral: Holy Trinity Cathedral, Palayamkottai
- Language: Tamil, English, Malayalam

Current leadership
- Bishop: Rt. Rev. A.R.G.S.T. Barnabas

Map
- CSI Tirunelveli Diocese

Website
- www.csitirunelveli.org

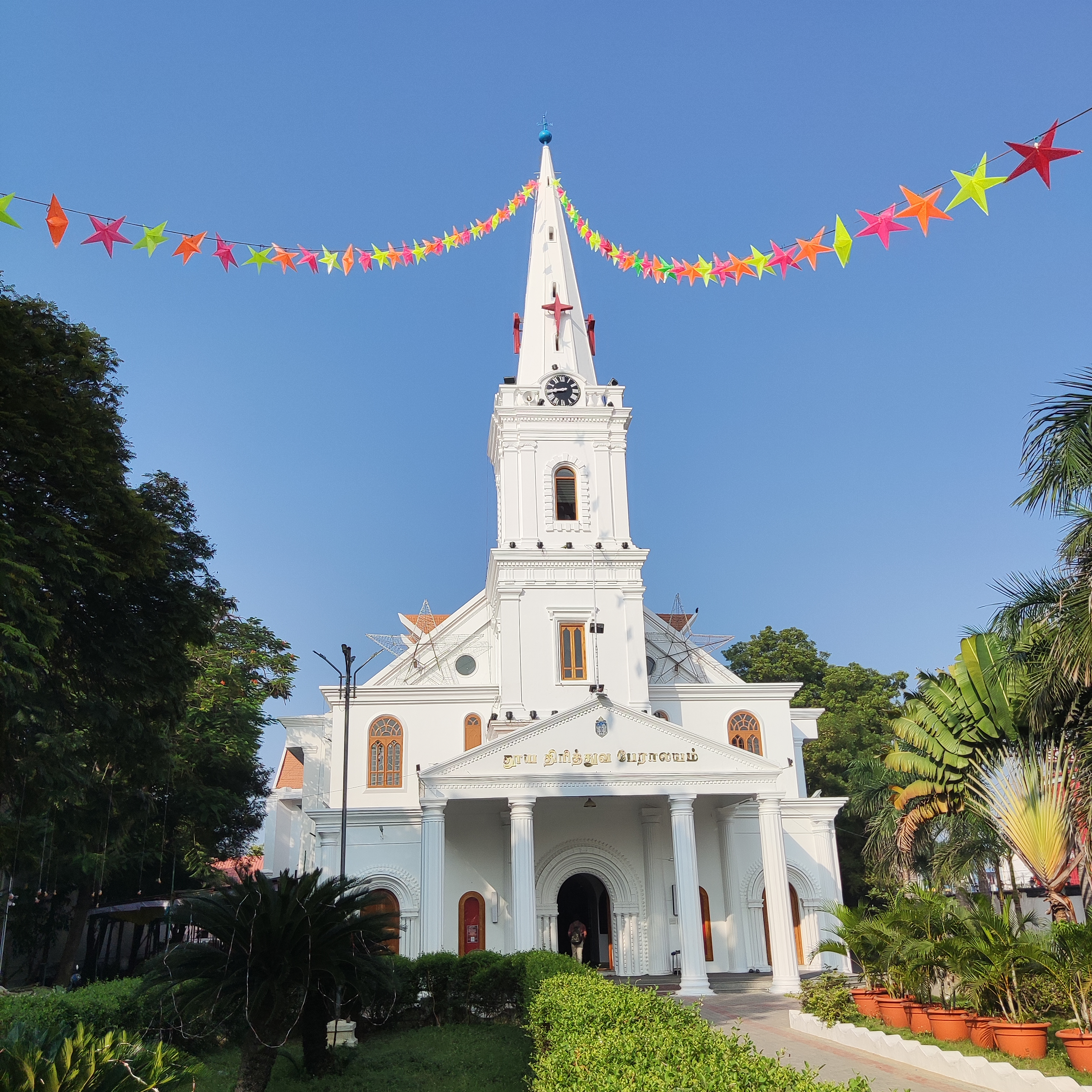
Holy Trinity Cathedral, Palayamkottai

The Diocese of Tirunelveli is one among the 25 dioceses of the Church of South India (CSI), a United Protestant denomination. It is based at Tirunelveli, in the state of Tamil Nadu, southern India. This is the second ever diocese to be formed in South India.

As of 2025, the diocese has 770 churches, 161 pastors, 9 deacons and a membership of 1,80, 202; it also runs 342 schools and fifteen colleges and hospitals. Holy Trinity Cathedral, at Palayamkottai is the Cathedral of Tirunelveli Diocese. The churches were established by the Church Missionary Society (CMS) missionaries and the Society for Propagating the Gospel (SPG) missionaries. In the year of 1919 Tinnevely Diocese Trust Association (TDTA) was formed by uniting both mission and also with Baptists and Presbyterians churches in the neighbourhood.

== History ==
In October 1896, Tinnevelly (the British name for Tirunelveli) was separated from the Diocese of Madras and Rev. Samuel Morley was ordained as the first Bishop of the newly formed diocese.

V. S. Azariah, the first Indian bishop, came from Tirunelveli Diocese.

== Issues in 2025 ==
The election for 2024-27 was not scheduled. Regarding this the Synod has formed an Administrative committee on 22 May 2025 and they took charge on 23 May 2025 led by Mr. Christopher Selvaraj and Mr. Anish Aseer. It was challenged by Mr. Selvakumar, Mr. Jesu Jegan and Mr. Solomon David. The court stepped in and tried to resolve it amicably. Due to the failure of Executive Committee to schedule the election for 2024-27, the High Court of Madras, Madurai Bench has ordered Former Justice Mr. Bharathidasan to election

== Reforms in 2021 ==
Prior to 2021-24 elections, one named Dr. E. Pradeep Kumar has filed a case to restrain Diocese workers to participate in the elections and it has been found valid and granted. Proceedings has been issued by Administrators to confirm this on 19 Dec 2020. This serves as a reform for employees.

== Issues in 2017 ==
Due to the representation of Mr Gabriel Jesudas, the court has ordered immediate election. Contrary to the order, the Diocese election was not conducted and the office bearers took charge informally. Then the Bishop/TDTA Chairman Rt.Rev. JJ Christudoss has complained about it to the ROC-Chennai and following that the ROC-Chennai has marked the company TDTA as dispute on 02 Nov 2017.

== Issues in 2015 ==
In November 2015, the Tirunelveli diocese increased the annual membership amount (in Tamil: Kanikkai) from Rs 100 to Rs 500. The retirement age of the pastors also increased by the CSI synod from 65 to 67, and a correction was made in the rule to permit pastors to remove someone from the diocese. Against all these decisions, members raised their voices. They requested to take a vote to implement these changes, but the Bishop ignored them and said that these changes are acceptable without proper voting. The members have thrown chairs to display their opposition. Due to the decision to increase the retirement age, J J Christdoss's retirement age also increased.

== Issues in 2014 ==
In 2014, one school teacher committed suicide as she was transferred. The diocese management was blamed for this.

== 2008 Issues ==
In 2008, the then administration led by a bus company owner rigged the election and but were eventually defeated in the election.

== Bishops of the Diocese ==
1. Samuel Morley (1896–1903)
2. Arthur Williams (1905–1914)
3. Edward Waller (1915–1923)
4. Norman Tubbs (1923–1928)
5. Frederick Western (1923–1928)
6. Stephen Neill (1939–1944)
7. George Selwyn (1945–1952)
8. Augustine Jebaraj (1953–1970)
9. Thomas Garrett (1971–1974)
10. Daniel Abraham (1975–1984)
11. Jason Dharmaraj (1985–1999)
12. Jeyapaul David (1999–2009)
13. JJ Christdoss (2009-2020)
14. A.R.G.S.T. Barnabas (2021 onwards)

== Educational Institutions under the Diocese ==
- Primary and Middle Schools -323
- Higher Secondary Schools-13
- Colleges -6
- Teacher Training Institutes -3

== See also ==
- Church of South India
- Thoothukudi-Nazareth Diocese
- Madurai-Ramnad Diocese
- Diocese of Madras
- Trichy-Tanjore Diocese
- Diocese of Coimbatore
- Diocese of Kanyakumari
- Christianity in Tamil Nadu
- Church of North India
- Christianity in India
