= CSI Immanuel Church, Salem =

- CSI Immanuel church, Salem
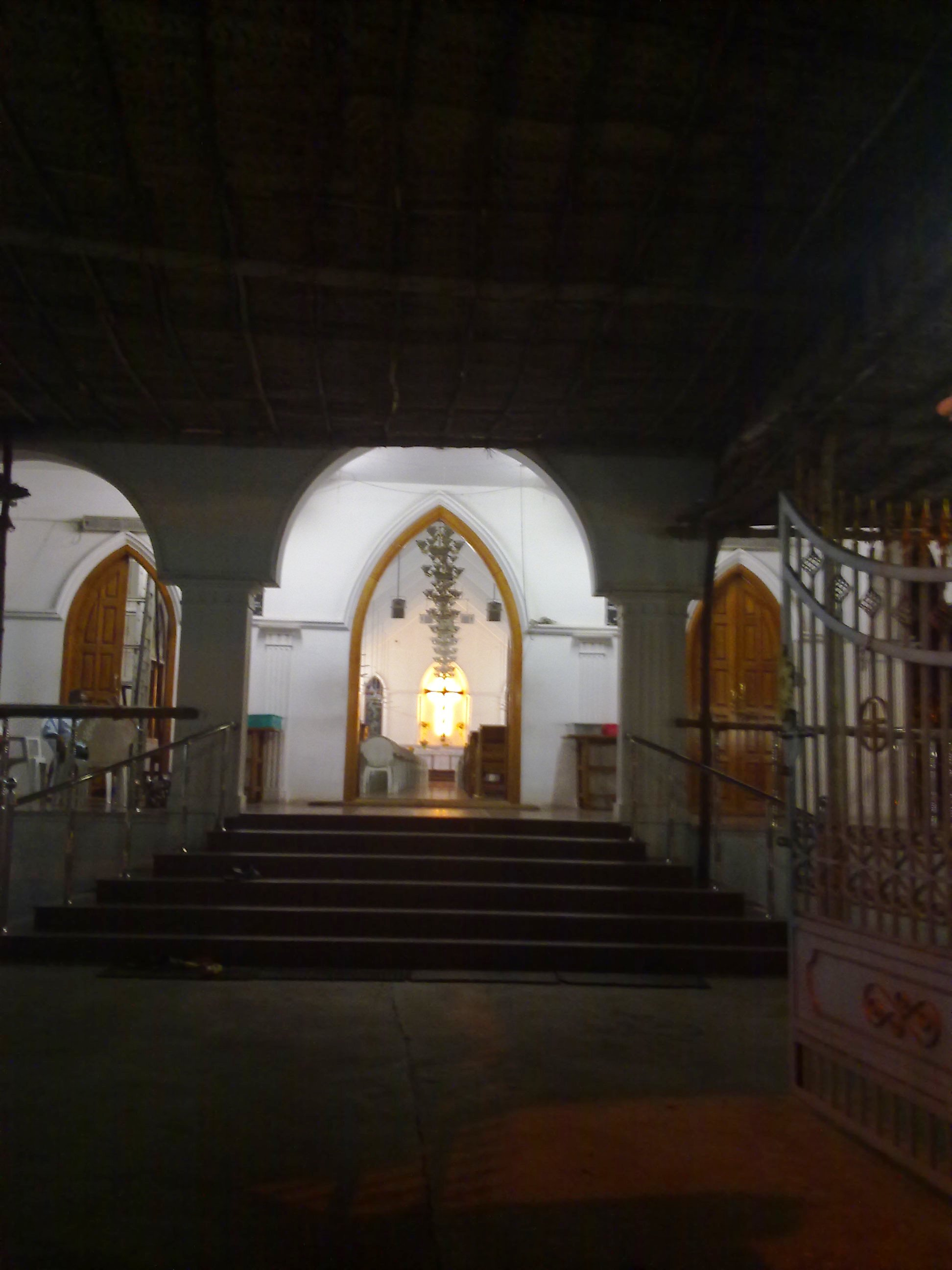
- CSI Immanuel Church, Salem
- 11.6757°N 78.1561°E
- Location: Hasthampatty, Sarada College Rd, Salem
- Country: India
- Denomination: Church of South India
- Tradition: London Mission

Architecture
- Style: Modern

Administration
- Diocese: Coimbatore Diocese

Clergy
- Bishop: Timothy Ravinder since (2013)

CSI Immanuel church, Salem is a Church in Salem in the Indian state of Tamil Nadu. Services are conducted both in Tamil and English.

== History ==
In May 1840 Rev. John Michael Lechler (1804–1861), the Apostle of Salem, a German Missionary of the London Missionary Society came to Salem from Coimbatore to take change of the Salem Mission work. He had been 5 Years in India, 4 years working with Rev. C. T. E. Rhenius (1790–1838) the Apostle of Tirunelveli). In the same year Lechler started a School of Industries, the first of its kind in British India. This led Lechler to be called the father of Industrial education in India. To develop the Industrial school Lechler needed more skilled workers and artisans. He brought skilled workers from Tirunelveli under the leadership of Catechist E. David of Palayamkottah (trained under Rev. C.T.E. Rhenius of Tirunelveli). 30 families of skilled workers from Tirunelveli came to Salem. They were given work according to their trades and accommodated in the Salem mission compound at Shevapet, Salem.

=== Transfer to CSI ===
After Indian Independence, the Government of India transferred the ownership of Government churches to the Indian Church Trustees, Calcutta. However, maintenance of the church remained the responsibility of the local Diocese. Following formation of the Church of South India in September 1947, the Christ Church came under the Diocese of Mysore. In 1950, the church was transferred to the newly formed Coimbatore Diocese. In 1963, the ownership of churches held by the Indian Church Trustees, Calcutta, was transferred to Church of South India Trust Association. The chapel of the London Missionary Society also came under the control of the Church of South India.

== Church Committee ==
The Committee has 9 pastorate committee and 4 DC members.

== Administration ==
CSI Immanuel Church was vested with the Indian Ecclesiastical Establishment from Coimbatore.
