= Anglican Bishop of Tinnevelly =

The Bishop of Tinnevelly was the Ordinary of the Anglican Church in Tinnevelly, Tamil Nadu, India, from its inception in 1896 until the foundation of the Church in India, Pakistan, Burma and Ceylon in 1927; and after that head of one of its Dioceses.

In October 1896, Tinnevelly was separated from the Diocese of Madras and Rev. Samuel Morley was ordained as the first Bishop of the newly formed diocese.

Under the British, the area was known as Tinnevelly; since independence, the Tamil spelling of Tirunelveli is normally used.

== Bishops of Tinnevelly ==
- Samuel Morley, 1896–1913.
- Arthur Acheson Williams, 1905–1914.
- Edward Harry Mansfield Waller 1915–1923.
- Norman Henry Tubbs, 1923–1928.
- Frederick Western 1929–1938
- Stephen Charles Neill 1939–1944.
- George Selwyn 1945–1953.
- Augustine Jebaraj 1953–1970
- Thomas Garrett 1971–1974
- Daniel Abraham 1975–1984
- Jason Dharmaraj 1985–1999
- Jeyapaul David 2000–2009
- JJ Christdoss 2009–2020
- Barnabas Argst 2021 onward
