= St. Mary's Church, Chennai =

C.S.I. St. Mary's Church
- Westminster Abbey of the East
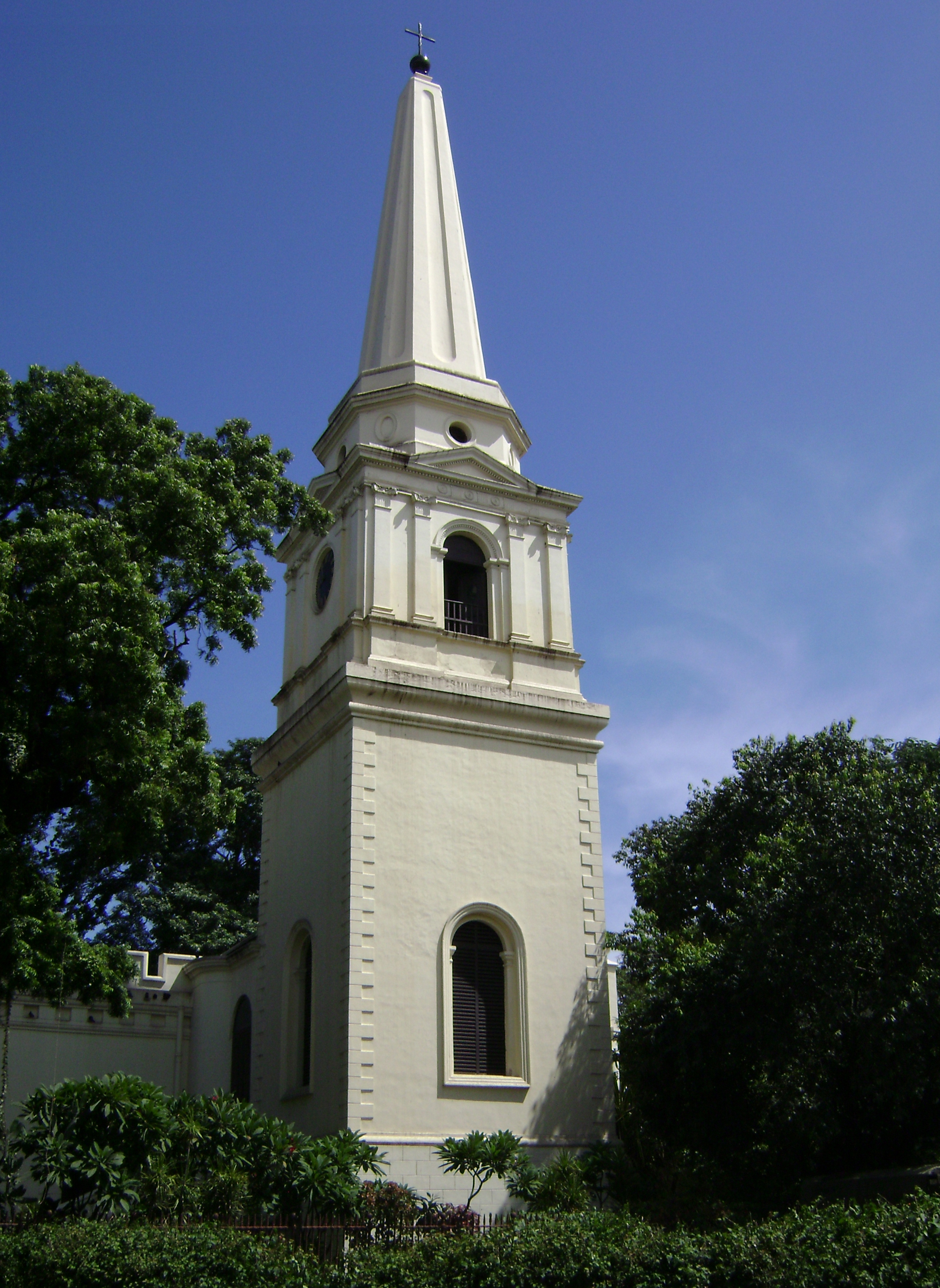
- C.S.I. St. Mary's Church
- 13.0787°N 80.2866°E
- Location: Fort St. George, Chennai
- Country: India
- Denomination: Church of South India
- Tradition: Anglican

History
- Former name: Presidency Church
- Founders: Streynsham Master; Rev. Richard Portman
- Dedication: Mary
- Consecrated: 28 October 1680

Architecture
- Functional status: Active; Preserved
- Groundbreaking: 25 March 1678 (Lady Day)
- Completed: 1680

Specifications
- Length: 80 ft (24 m)
- Width: 50 ft (15 m)

Administration
- Diocese: Diocese of Madras

Clergy
- Bishop: George Stephen Jayaraj

C.S.I. St. Mary's Church is the Anglican church located at Fort St George in Chennai, Tamil Nadu, India and is the oldest British building in India. The church is popularly known as 'Westminster Abbey of the East'.

== History ==
From 1639, when Madras was founded, until 1678, when Streynsham Master was appointed the English East India Company's Agent at Madras, religious services were conducted in the dining-room of the Factory House. It was at Master's initiative, and without the sanction of the Directors of the Company, that a subscription was started for the construction of the church.

The sum collected amounted to 805 pagodas with the Governor and other officers contributing. Construction was started on 25 March 1678 – Lady Day, whereby the church acquired its name. The church was rendered the only bomb-proof building at the time, in the Fort, on account of a peculiarly designed roof, details of which are provided under Architecture.

Construction was completed in the course of two years and the church was consecrated on 28 October 1680 by the chaplain Rev. Richard Portman. The ceremony was marked by the firing of small arms and cannon by the fort's garrison.

In 1753 Robert Clive married Margaret Maskelyne at this church. They left for England but they returned in 1755 as the East India Company established itself in Bengal.

On account of its peculiar roof-structure, the church was used as a barrack and granary between December, 1758 and January, 1759 during the Second Carnatic War, when the French besieged Madras and again when Hyder Ali invaded the town in the late 18th century.

== Architecture ==
The architect of the church was either Edward Foule, Master-Gunner of Fort St. George, or William Dixon, Chief Gunner of the Fort, in 1678.

The building consists of a nave and two aisles, with the nave protruding about 12 feet further than the aisles, thus forming the sanctuary. This extension was carried out in 1884 to house the choir.

At the west end of the nave is a spacious gallery, resting on carved Burma teak pillars, which originally housed the seat for the Governor. In 1761, this was considerably enlarged to incorporate an organ, and provided with the two curved staircases, which still exist, to access the gallery from outside. In the nineteenth century, the gallery was reduced to its present size, and the organ removed later, in 1884, coincident with the building of the new sanctuary.

Though it now has a tower to the west of the nave, this was not part of the original design but was rather added at the end of the seventeenth century on the orders of Sir John Goldsborough. The spire was added at the beginning of the eighteenth century and some old prints show the tower without the spire. The tower originally stood free of the church and was linked up with the main building much later.

Two vestries at the east end of each of the aisles were built in the nineteenth century.

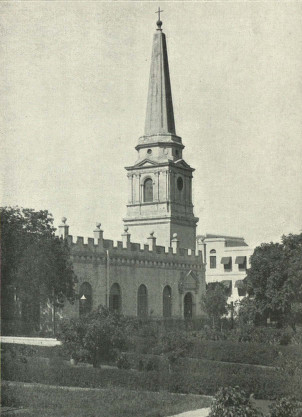
St. Mary's Church, c. 1905

The internal dimensions of the building are 86 feet by 56 feet, with the outside walls 4 feet thick and the walls separating the nave from the aisles, 3 feet thick. The extraordinary thickness of the walls was to protect the building from attack and damage during storms.

One of the unique and cunning features that was incorporated in its design was a bomb-proof roof approximately four feet thick and rounded in the manner of a wagon's roof, so as to cause cannonballs to ricochet. However, it must be kept in mind that the bombs it was designed to withstand were seventeenth century cannonballs. Also, wood was avoided as much as possible in the original design to obviate fires.

== Altar piece ==
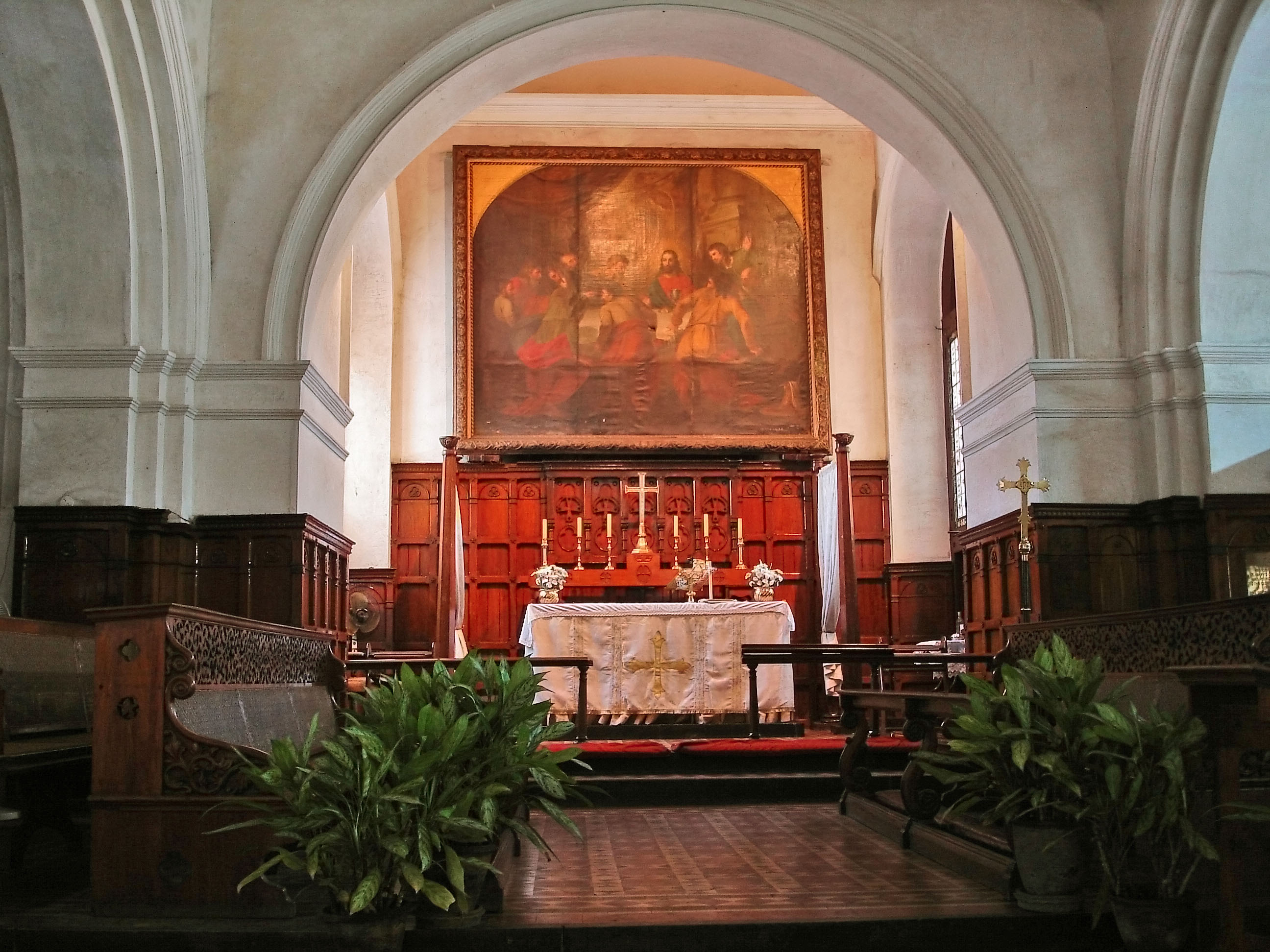
The altar of the church

The altar piece, a depiction of the Last Supper, is unsigned but is said to portray obvious signs of the Raphaelite school, and it is supposed that Raphael himself painted the central figures. The altar piece was brought to Madras as part of the spoils of war by the British troops who stormed Pondicherry in 1761.

== Church-Yard ==
Originally, no church-yard existed and all those who died in the fort were buried in the Guava Garden, that adjoined the Governor's House in the 17th and early 18th centuries. This grove was located where the High Court of Judicature and Law College now stand.

During the second siege of Madras by the French, in 1758 - 59, the British were put to great difficulties by the fact that the French were afforded shelter from bullets and shells by the tombs. Therefore, on the petition to the Select Committee of Sir John Call, the Chief Engineer of the fort, the cemetery was re-located to the north-west of the island, while the tomb-stones were brought and placed around the church. In 1782, some of them were again removed during the invasion of the fort by Hyder Ali, when they were used as gun-platforms. It was not until 1807 that they were re-collected and restored to their former position around the church.

When the Capuchin Church of St. Andrew was demolished subsequent to the Peace of Aix-la-Chapelle, many of the tomb-stones were brought here, thus explaining the large numbers of Roman Catholic grave-stones, inscribed in Latin and Portuguese.

== Important ceremonies and burials ==
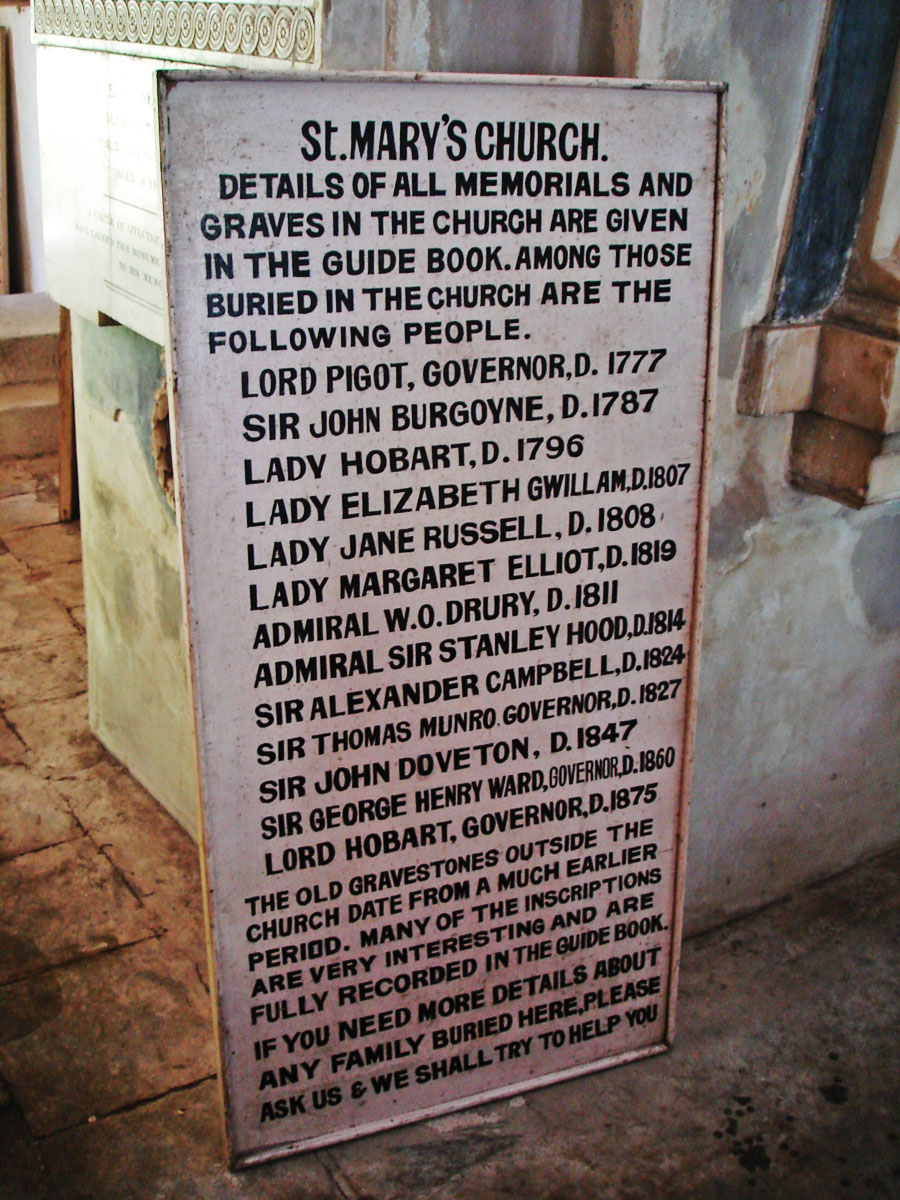
List of notable people buried at the Church

This ancient prayer house solemnized the marriages of both Robert Clive and Elihu Yale. He was a governor of Fort St. George, and a vestryman and treasurer of St Mary's Church. His later gift of money to Cotton Mather helped in the foundation of Yale University in the United States of America. On 6 October 1968, the 250th anniversary of the naming of Yale College for Elihu Yale, the classmates of Chester Bowles, then the American ambassador to India, donated money for lasting improvements to the church and erected a plaque to commemorate the occasion.

Amongst the few elite actually interred within the vaults of the church are four other governors of Fort St. George – George, Lord Pigot, died 1777; Sir Thomas Munro, Bt., died 1827; Sir Henry George Ward, died 1860; and the Rt. Hon. Vere Henry, Lord Hobart, died 1875.

Numerous memorial-plaques and monuments exist within the church of which two, that of Sir Barry Close, who was Adjutant General to Gen. George Harris at the Siege of Seringapatam, and gave his name to Closepet, and that of Lt. Col. Joseph Moorhouse, who was killed at the Siege of Bangalore, in the Third Anglo-Mysore War, would be of particular interest to the historian.

Bird artist Elizabeth Gwillim (d. 1807) is also buried here.

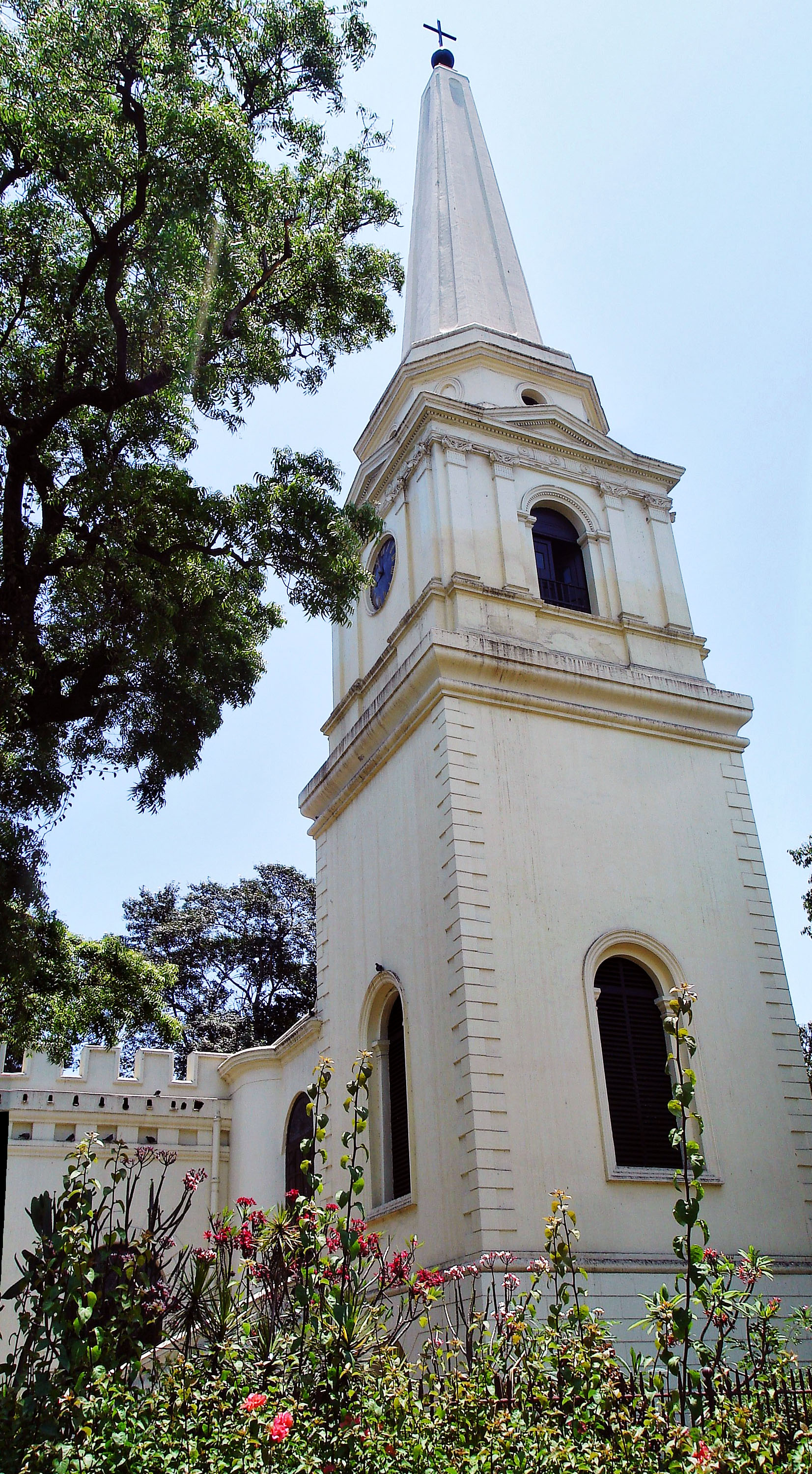
The steeple of St. Mary's Church, in the fort

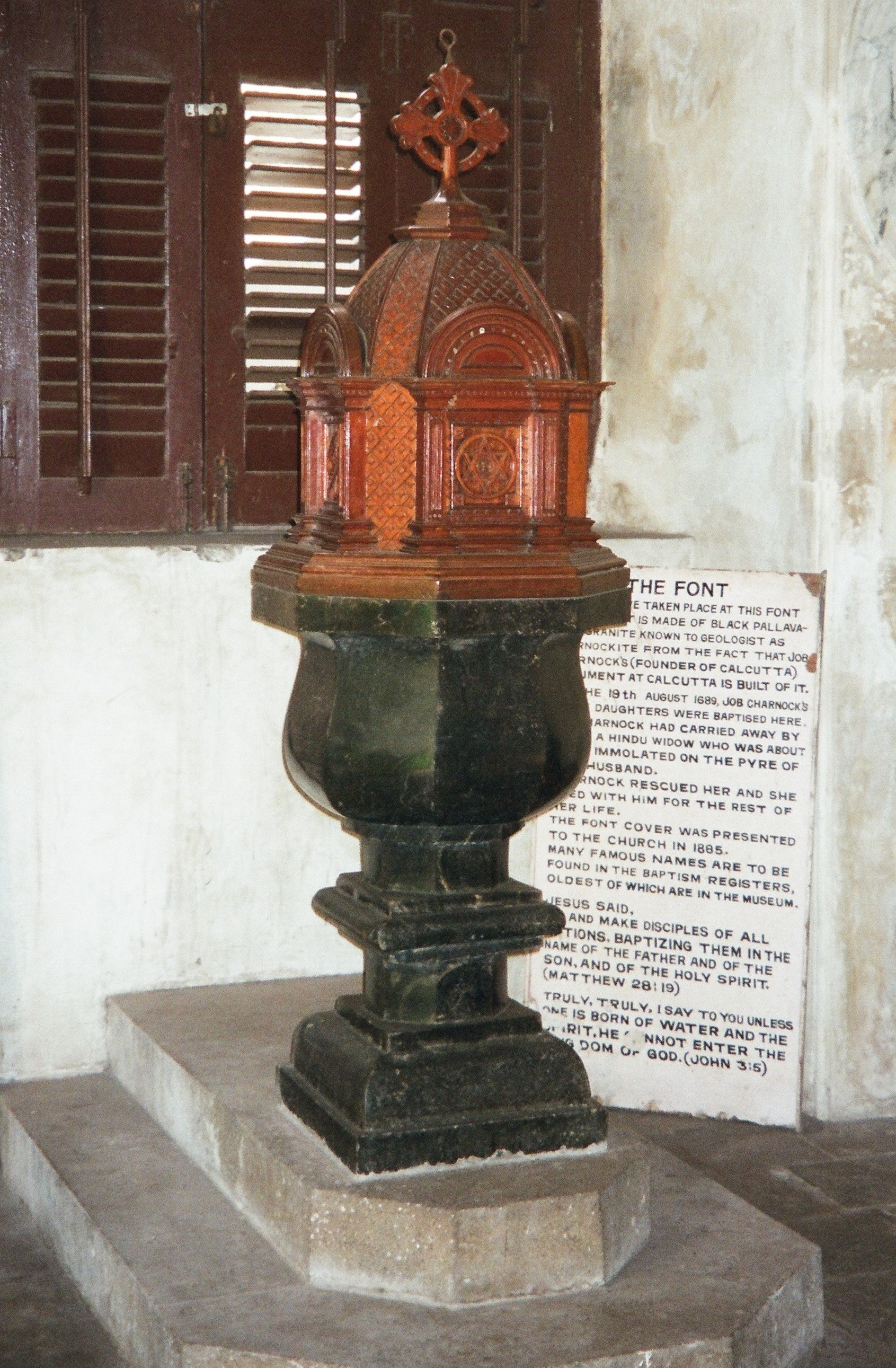
Baptismal Font at the Church

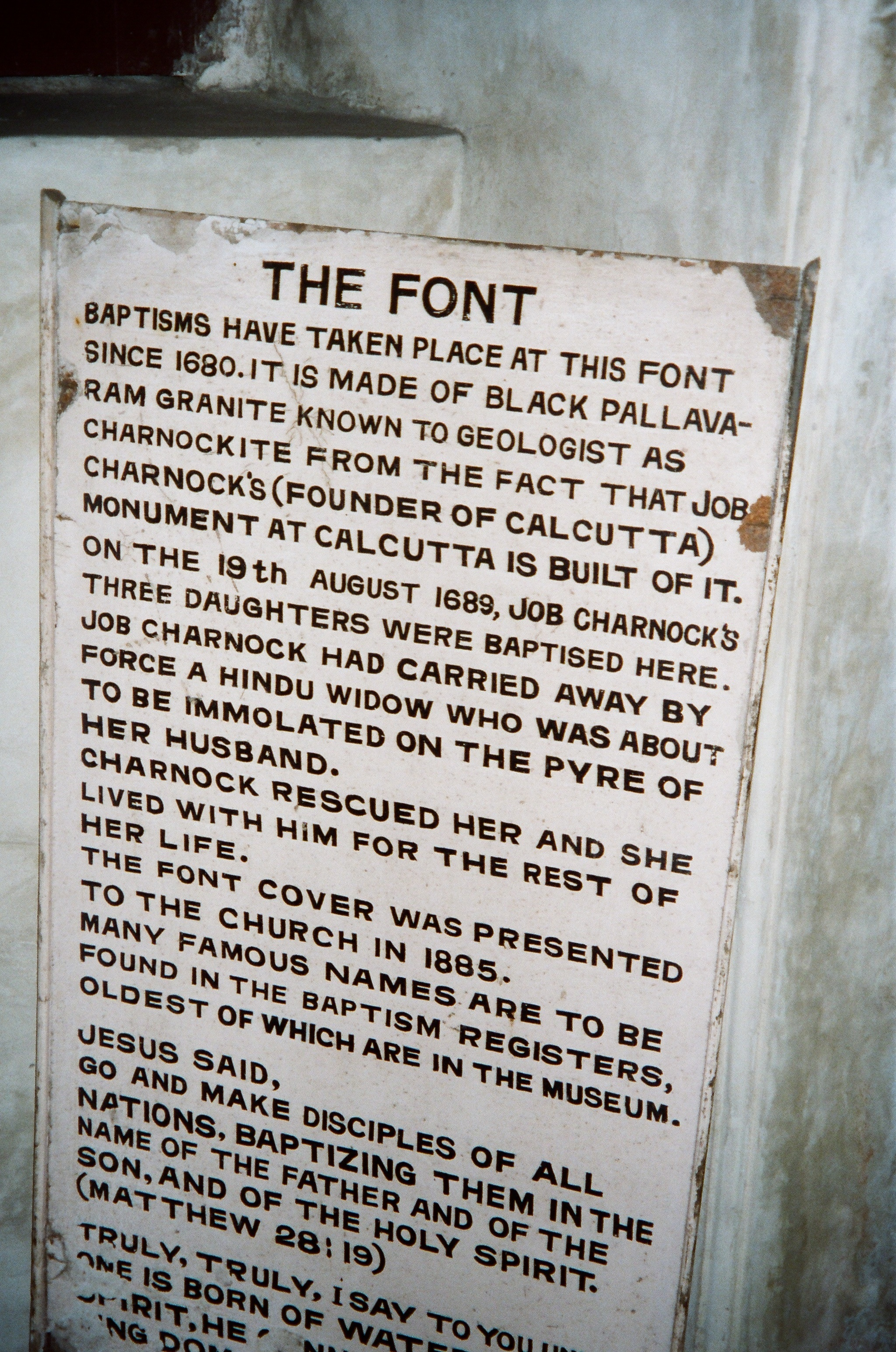
Plaque gives the history of the Font

== Additional References ==
- "Madras 1922 Hand Book", Indian Science Congress, Madras Diocesan Press, Madras, 1921
- "The Church in the Fort", St. Mary's Church, Church of South India, 2002
