= Frederick Augustus Packer =

Australian musician

Frederick Augustus Packer

Frederick Augustus Gow Packer (1839 – 1 August 1902), generally referred to as F. A. Packer but also Frederick Gow Packer, was an Australian composer of Anglican spiritual and romantic music.

== History ==
Packer was born in Reading, Berkshire, of a musical family. His parents, Frederick Alexander Packer (died 2 July 1862), occasionally referred to as F. Alexander Packer, and Augusta Packer (née Gow) (c. 1819 – 23 February 1893), daughter of Nathaniel Gow, composer of "Caller Herrin", and granddaughter of Niel Gow, were members of the Royal Academy of Music in London. The young Frederick Augustus was taught music and learned to sing and play organ from his parents.

In 1852 the family (Note: They had four sons and four daughters, all aged under 14, and subsequently at least two more.) left for Australia by the barque Sylph, in steerage; in July arriving in Hobart, where he took up the position of organist at St David's Cathedral in Davey Street. It is not clear whether Packer senior left England with the position of organist at St David's in mind. When William Wilkins Russell resigned the post in 1841 his place was taken by Mrs Elliott, followed in 1852 by the 17-year-old Miss Bonney, but amid controversy, she resigned and Frederick Alexander Packer, "recently arrived from England", took her place.
He opened St David's new organ, built by Bishop and Starr of London, on 26 July 1857. Despite initial enthusiasm, it had significant faults, eventually attributed to subsidence of the floor on which it was built and lack of periodic maintenance.
Frederick Alexander Packer was still employed as organist of St David's, and had achieved some fame as a composer, when he died. His eldest son Frederick Augustus had been away in Launceston, but returned the previous day.

=== As public servant ===
Packer found employment in the Telegraph Office in Hobart: as a telegraphist; appointed telegraph operator in 1859, then briefly with the Customs Office in Launceston and later promoted to superintendent. In July 1862 he succeeded Henslowe as sessional clerk of the Tasmanian House of Assembly,

He was appointed Clerk of the House of Assembly and Librarian of Parliament in 1882

He retired as Parliamentary Clerk in December 1894, to be replaced by H. T. Maning (died 7 April 1896).

=== As musician ===
Following the death on 10 May 1862 of Thomas Hawley Sharpe, Packer was appointed organist of St Andrew's Kirk, Launceston, but with the impending death of his father, Packer returned to Hobart and Robert Sharpe (possibly unrelated) was appointed in his place.

In July 1862 he inherited his father's position as organist at St David's, coming into conflict with Rev. John Watson, the curate, and Nigel Gresley, the churchwarden, who both resigned. In defending his position, Packer produced encomiums from Samuel Parsons D.D., incumbent of All Saints' Church, Hobart, and R. K. Ewing of St Andrew's Kirk, Launceston.

He had some success as a music teacher, notably of Amy Sherwin. In late 1863 or early 1864 he was elected to the Royal College of Organists.

Packer composed and directed an "Ode of Welcome", sung by five thousand schoolchildren at the Queen's Domain, to Prince Alfred, the Duke of Edinburgh, on his visit to Tasmania as part of his 1867/8 tour of Australia. The effect was better than feared, as the rehearsals were notable for the children's lack of enthusiasm.

He was instrumental in securing for the City of Hobart an organ, built by J. W. Walker of London, and reckoned to be (apart from that of the Sydney Town Hall) the finest in Australia, which he opened on 17 March 1870. in a grand concert, playing Haydn's Creation and Handel's Hallelujah Chorus. Other organists to perform were his brother John Packer and Albert Alexander RAM. By 1872 he was being referred to as the "city organist" of Hobart Town, but it was at most a complimentary term or honorary title rather than an appointment. He led the Tasmanian troupe which participated in the Intercolonial Music Festival in Melbourne 26–31 December 1872. Monday was "Tasmania night", and their contribution was a cantata composed by Packer, with Longfellow's Wreck of the Hesperus as the text, each dramatic episode being sung by Tasmanian performers with a variety of instrumental accompaniment, Packer on organ and his uncle Charles S. Packer on pianoforte. Soloists Amy Sherwin and her sister (Lucy? Sarah?) received good notices, as did Walter Sherwin, (Note: The tenor Walter Sherwin (né John Shickle) (died 22 September 1881) was father of Rosina Carandini (later Palmer) and Fanny Carandini. Sherwin lost a hand in a shooting accident c. 1870: he always wore gloves and no-one guessed one hand was artificial. No relationship to Amy Sherwin has been found.) Rosina Carandini and Fannie Carandini, Henry Gordon, and Mr W. J. Reynolds. In their absence, the Hobart Philharmonic Society, of which Packer was conductor, organised a benefit concert at the Town Hall for his return.

He organised in 1879 a "first annual concert", at which practically every well-known vocalist and instrumentalist in the colony took part.

In 1884 Hobart citizens were treated to a free concert at which Packer demonstrated the versatility and power of the Town Hall organ. This was claimed as their first opportunity to hear the instrument that was costing them so dearly. A highlight was a vocal duet from Benedict's opera The Lily of Killarney by H. and A. Packer. (Note: His brothers Harry Effingham Packer (21 August 1861 – ) and Arthur Howard Packer (11 November 1850 – 20 August 1912), father of Robert Clyde Packer)

In 1885 disagreement arose between Packer and the church administration over divided control of the choir (between organist and choirmaster). There was also talk of a pay cut, so in 1886 he resigned, to be replaced by Raymond Maynard. He took up the organist's stool at the church of St John the Baptist, Goulburn Street, where he presided for the last five years' residence in Hobart. Packer resigned the post of City Organist in 1895, with A. J. Mills appointed as his replacement.

It is not clear whether Packer formally moved to Sydney. No reports of farewells or editorials on the subject have been found, but from 1895 he had many engagements in Sydney, several in conjunction with the City Organist Auguste Wiegand and the Catholic Church: playing the organ at St Patrick's and contributed to a benefit concert for Wiegand at the Town Hall. He gave a recital at the Sydney Town Hall in 1896

His last years were spent in Sydney, for much of the time in the Parramatta Asylum, where he died.

== Works ==
As compositions by both father and son were credited to "F. A. Packer", some credits are indeterminate. Identities of the two men were confused, even as early as 1936 Hobart. For instance, "Nearer to Thee" (hymn 109) to the familiar poem by Sarah Flower Adams, and dedicated to Archdeacon Davies is credited to F. A. Packer R.A.M. so must be Frederick Alexander, the father.

- "Mazurka" was advertised in 1861 together with "Nearer to Thee", so presumably composed by Frederick Alexander.

=== Credited to Frederick Augustus Packer ===
- "The Garrison Polka" (1854), credited to F. A. Packer, jun.,
- "There Is Love" (to a poem by Thomas Hood) (1854), credited; included in "De La Court Bouquet" Also reported as "There Is Love for You and Me"
- "Deus Misereatur" (1859), credited
- "Forget Me Not" (1860), credited; to the poem "Forget Me Not in Absence"
- "The Fairy Sisters" (1862)
- "Violette" (1862). Perhaps the same work as "Violette! I dream of thee"
- "Oh Sing Once More That Parting Strain" (1862) to words by George Hodder and dedicated to Mrs Gore Browne
- "The Brooklet" (c. 1869) duet for piano
- "Wouldn't You Like to Know" (1869)
- "Tasmanian National Anthem" (1879)
- "Under The Snow" (1879), dedicated to Amy Sherwin

Several songs received a second, revised, edition in 1880:
- "Listening"
- "Is My Lover on the Sea"
- "Legend of the Crossbill"
As well as a large collection of new releases:
- "Little Blue Shoes"
- "My Star in Heaven"
- "Two Little Hands"
- "Loved and Lost"
- "Come Back Sweetheart"
- "Long, Long Years Ago"
- "When the Wattle Was in Bloom"
- "Death of Cock Robin and Jenny Wren"
A brace of songs published by Chappell & Co in London and J. Walch and Sons in Australia in 1882, but already familiar through frequent performance, include:
- "For the Old Love's Sake", dedicated to Miss Frederica Mitchell
- "'Tis sad to Love in Vain", dedicated to Miss Christian
- "Withered", predicted by Christian to match the popularity of "Listening"
- "The Boat with the Snowy white Sail" sung by Miss Gresley
- "Break", to a poem by Tennyson, dedicated to Miss Theodora Mayer
- "The Omen Stone", a demanding piece for piano
- "True Love Never Dies", for tenor, sung by Mr Benson
- "The Standard of England", dedicated to Armes Beaumont
- "Susie Bell", described as 'a man-o'-war's song in answer to "Nancy Lee" (Note: An 1840 shanty by Stephen Adams with lyrics by Fred E. Weatherly, of which 100,000 sheets of sheet music were sold.)'.

- "Come unto Me" (1883 or earlier)
- "The Land of Beauty" cantata was successfully staged in November 1894 but not reprised at the Exhibition of January 1905, owing, according to some, to a clique jealous of Packer's successes. When Sydney's City Organ was refurbished in 1895, Auguste Wiegand chose "All Things Show Thy Gracious Beauty" from this cantata as a demonstration piece among favorites by Beethoven and Mozart.
- "Madre Divina" (1893 or earlier)
- "For Evermore" (1896) an "answer" to "Listening"
- "Drifting Away" (1896)
- "Salve! Salve!", a.k.a. "Solve the Secret", was first used as an offertory at St Patrick's Church, Sydney in 1895. His Ave Maria was used by the same (Catholic) church/ e also composed a Maria Divina, used by St Mary's Cathedral, Sydney (also Catholic) in 1896.
- "Take Up Thy Cross", "Oh Let Him whose Sorrow", and "Dolores Elegia" played at a memorial service

Packer was as much a lyricist as a composer, putting words to most of his songs, but also to tunes by other composers, such as Auguste Wiegand's "Orange Flower Serenade".

Compositions published by Palings in 1897
- "Stolen Kisses"
- "Flirting"
- "Jealousy"
- "Pompadour Gavotte"

== A critic ==
Packer was accused by The Clipper of being lauded by "The Muckery" (the Hobart Mercury) as an "artist" or musical genius, when he was second-rate and only succeeded through having no competition; unlike his uncle Charles, he never ventured overseas.

== Recordings ==
- 2011 Songs of Fred Packer by Kelly Garland
- 2015 When the Yellow Wattle Was in Bloom
- 2016 Three pieces of Frederick A. Packer: Sion Reade concert band

== Family ==
Packer married Marion Chamberlain (died 25 February 1885) on 1 March 1869. They had at least one child:

- Mona Marion Packer (December 1869 – 8 April 1945) married oil company executive Robert Lowe Gordon, lived at Neutral Bay.

On 22 November 1890 he married again, to Clarice Octavia Allison, daughter of Francis Allison of Hobart. They had at least one son

- Frederick Ryland Packer (28 January 1892 – ). He enlisted with the First AIF in August 1915; POW in Germany. By 1940 was a clerk with Commonwealth Oil Refineries, married Nellie May sometime around 1925.

His siblings include second son John Edward Packer (c. 1840 – 25 August 1900), who joined the Tasmanian public service as a telegraphist, later under-treasurer 1886–1894, when he was paralysed by a stroke, retired 1895 and moved to Sydney early 1898, where he died. He was organist for St George's Church, Battery Point, for over 25 years. He married twice and had at least six children. Others were A. H. Packer, of the Customs Department; R. K. Packer, of the Queensland Telegraph Service; and H. E. Packer, Secretary for Public Works

The distinguished organist and composer (of the oratorio Crown of Thorns) Charles Sandys Packer was an uncle.
