= Bishop Garrett =

Bishop Garrett may refer to:

- Alexander Charles Garrett (1832–1924), American bishop of The Episcopal Church
- Thomas Garrett (bishop) (d. 1980), British bishop in the Church of South India
