= S J Samuel =

Bishop of Coimbatore

S J Samuel was the second Bishop of Coimbatore.
