= Daniel Abraham =

Daniel Abraham may refer to:

- Daniel Abraham (author) (born 1969), science fiction and fantasy author, who also writes as part of the joint-pseudonym James S.A. Corey
- Daniel Abraham (rugby league) (born 1981), Australian rugby league footballer
- Daniel Abraham (conductor) (born 1968), director of the Bach Sinfonia and director of choral activities at American University in Washington, D.C.
- S. Daniel Abraham (1924–2025), American businessman
- Daniel Abraham (cyclist) (born 1985), Dutch-Eritrean cyclist
- Daniel Abraham (bishop), Indian Bishop of Tirunelveli from 1975 to 1984
- Dan Abraham (born 1970), American film director, screenwriter and animator
