= Christ Church, Salem =

- CSI Christ Church, Salem
- Christ Church, Salem
- 11°39′21″N 78°09′20″E
- Location: Fort Road, Near Collectorate, Salem
- Country: India
- Denomination: Church of South India
- Tradition: Anglican

History
- Consecrated: 1875

Architecture
- Style: Indo-Saracenic
- Groundbreaking: 1871
- Completed: 1875
- Construction cost: BINR 15000

Administration
- Diocese: Coimbatore Diocese

Christ Church is located on Fort Road, near the District Collectorate, in the heart of Salem City, Tamil Nadu, India. The church has been serving the community for the last 140 years, since its consecration in 1875. The church services at Christ Church are conducted both in English and Tamil. The church was designed by architect Robert Fellowes Chisholm, who was a pioneer of the Indo-Saracenic architecture, and also designed the Senate House buildings of the University of Madras and the Madras Presidency College

== History ==
The early history of Christ Church is recorded by Rev. Frank Penny, LL.M, in his book, The Church in Madras : being the History of the Ecclesiastical and Missionary Action of the East India Company in the Presidency of Madras From 1835 to 1861: Volume III(p. 294-296).

There was a small Church of England chapel at the Yercaud Hills, with a resident clergyman, who visited Salem once a month. In Salem itself, there existed a small chapel of the London Missionary Society, which was used by the Christian congregation in Salem. For nearly 60 years of the 19th century, there was perfect understanding between the missionaries of the London Missionary Society (LMS) and the officials of the East India Company, and the chapel was freely available to conduct the services of the Church of England for the officers of the company.

=== Church Building Committee ===
In the 1860s there was developed some misunderstanding between the LMS missionaries and the Church of England congregation, hence a need felt for constructing a separate church a Salem for the European, Anglo-Indian and native Tamil population. For this purpose a committee was formed in 1866, with H Gomez as honorary secretary, to collect funds for building a new Church of England church in Salem. The church was intended for conducting both English and Tamil services.

Some of the main contributors for building the church were

- C N Pochin, Dist. Collector Rs. 1210
- Rev. D G Clarke Rs. 100
- The Bishop of Madras Rs. 150
- H Boalth Rs. 50
- MacFarlane Rs. 100
- R Fischer Rs. 300
- Gomez Rs. 200
- Moses Pillai Rs. 60
- F R Price Rs. 100
- Middleton Rs. 50
- C Pritchard Rs. 50
- J C Hanyngton Rs. 500
- R K Puckle Rs. 50
- Devasagaiyam Rs. 200
- C T Longley Rs. 400
- H Austin Rs. 50
- J Longley Rs. 50
- M/s Wilson & Co. Rs. 100

The total amount collected, along with other miscellaneous contributions was Rs. 3800.

=== Cost Estimates ===
The building cost of the church was estimated to be Rs. 9127, as estimated by the Consulting Architect of the Government of Madras. Further, a sum of Rs. 1500 was contributed by the Church Building Society. The rest of the funds amounting to Rs. 4512 (including Rs. 1897) was granted by the Government of Madras.

=== Site ===
The site chosen for the site, belonged to Mrs. Thomas Foulkes, sister of Mr. Robert Fischer, and originally had a club house building. Mrs. Foulkes agreed to swap her land, even though it involved some loss for her, and the club house was brought down, and the church was constructed.

=== Construction ===
The foundation stone of the church was laid on by Rev. D G Clarke on 16 September 1871. The lectern, furniture and fittings were donated by Mrs. Foulkes, in memory of her daughter who died in 1870. The Eastern window and the reredos was donated by James Fischer, in memory of his wife who had died in 1861. The Western Circular window was raised in memory of E F Elliot. The church bell was given by the Government of Madras. When finished the total cost of construction was Rs. 15000. After construction, the church interior length was 68 ft., and the nave was 47x22 ft2. The church was consecrated on 26 October 1875, by the Bishop of Madras, the Right Reverend Frederick Gell.

== Administration ==
The Christ Church was vested with the British Crown, and the maintenance looked after by the Government of Madras. The Incumbent, Yercaud, was in-charge of Christ Church, with both Salem and Yercaud being administered by the Chaplain of the Indian Ecclesiastical Establishment from Coimbatore.

== Tamil Services ==
The priests of the Society for the Propagation of the Gospel in Foreign Parts (SPG), conducted the services in Tamil for the native congregation. In the 1920s, the Railway Colony was developed in the Salem Junction, and native Tamil congregation started meeting at the London Mission chapel, near the railway station. However, once the Railway Colony moved to Erode, the Tamil services were resumed at the Christ Church

== Transfer to CSI ==
After Indian Independence, the Government of India, transferred the ownership of all Government churches to the Indian Church Trustees, Calcutta, as the absolute owners of all such Church properties in India. However, maintenance of the church is the responsibility of the local Diocese. Following formation of the Church of South India in September 1947, the Christ Church, came under the Diocese of Mysore. In 1950, the church was transferred to the newly formed Coimbatore Diocese. In 1963, the ownership of the churches held by the Indian Church Trustees, Calcutta, was transferred to Church of South India Trust Association. The chapel of the London Missionary Society also came under the control of the Church of South India

== Church Bell ==
The original church bell was given by the Government of Madras, mounted in the bell tower is no longer used. A new bell, cast in 1982, and attached steeple of the belfry tower is now being used.

== Vintage Gallery ==
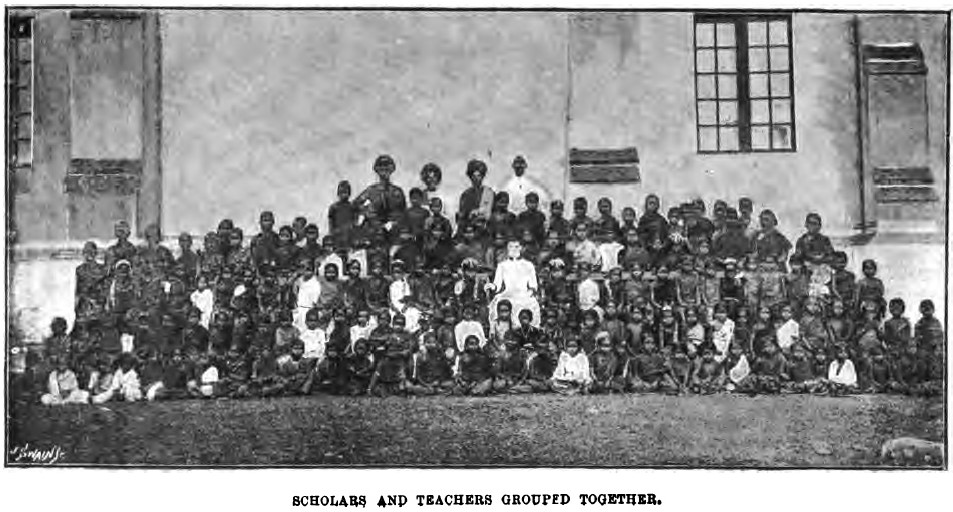
Native Girls' Sunday School, Salem (p. 75, 1890), London Missionary Society

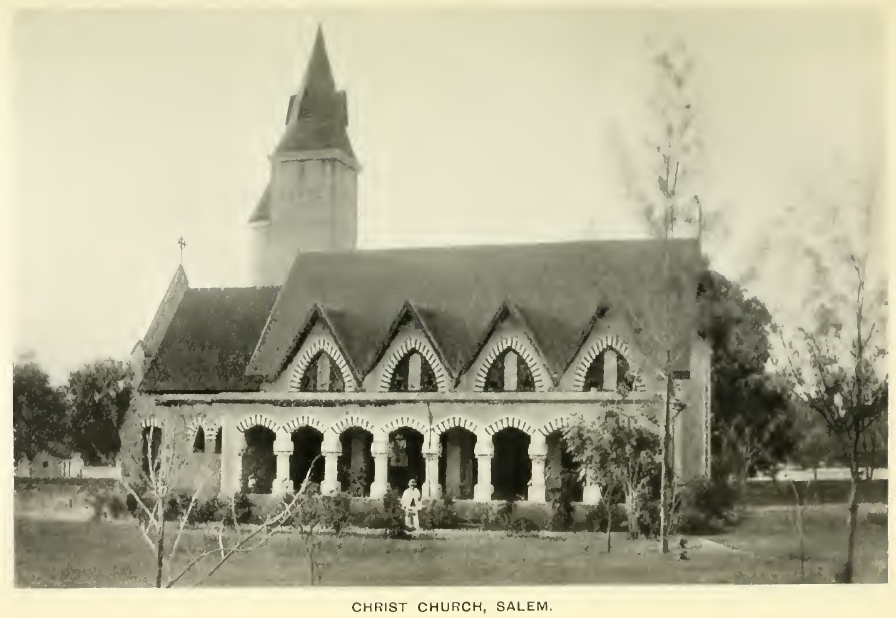
Christ Church, Salem (1922), by Rev. Frank Penny's Book 'The Church in Madras - Vol. III'

== Memorial Inscriptions and Cemetery ==
The church has several memorial inscriptions, one being that for Major. Hodges of the Madras Police died in 1878. In the cemetery lie buried Robert Morris (died 1757), Charles Carpenter (died 1818), brother-in-law of Sir. Walter Scott, and members of the Fischer family who were the Zamindars in the Salem District since 1833 (the only European Zamindari in the Madras Presidency).

== Present Times ==
At present, the Christ Church, also has a Parish Hall, Parsonage, Zion Hall, and three cemeteries. The 220-year-old Anglican Cemetery of Salem is also administered by this church. Recently, some renovations were undertaken, before its 140th anniversary. The church has some fourth and fifth generation members.
