= Manickam Dorai =

Indian bishop

Manickam Dorai was the fourth Bishop of Coimbatore.

== Notes ==
Religious titles
Preceded by William Moses	Bishop of Coimbatore; 2000-2010	Succeeded by Timothy Ravinder
