= Masilamani =

Maasilamani may refer to:

- Shiva, a major Hindu deity, known as Maasilamani or Masilamaninathar in Tamil, the pure (masila) gem (mani)
  - Masilamaninathar Temple, several temples dedicated to the deity in Tamil Nadu, India
    - Masilamaninathar Temple, Tharangambadi
    - Masilamaniswara Temple, Thirumullaivoyal
    - Masilamaniswara Temple, Thiruvaduthurai
- Maasilamani, a 2009 Indian Tamil-language action comedy film
- A. B. Masilamani (1914–1990), an Indian pastor
- Masilamani Azariah, a Church of South India bishop
