= Vedanayagam Devasahayam =

CSI bishop

The Right Reverend Vedanayagam Devasahayam
- Bishop of Madras
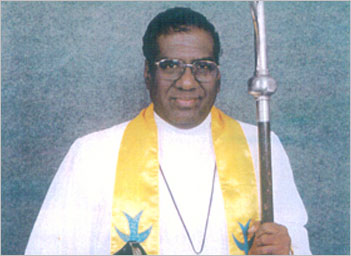
- Church: Church of South India
- Diocese: Madras
- Installed: 1999
- Predecessor: Masilamani Azariah
- Successor: George Stephen Jayaraj

The Rt. Rev. Vedanayagam Devasahayam was an Indian bishop in the late 20th and early 21st centuries. He was the Bishop of Madras from 1999 to 2014. Before his episcopacy, he was a theological educator at Gurukul Lutheran Theological College in Chennai
