= Geoffrey Lunt =

Anglican bishop

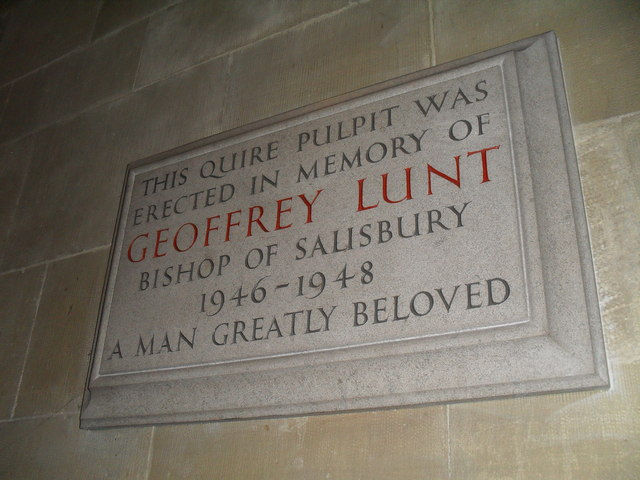
Monument to Bishop Lunt in Salisbury Cathedral

Geoffrey Charles Lester Lunt MC (1885–1948) was an Anglican bishop in the 20th century.

== Early life and education ==
Born into an ecclesiastical family Lunt was educated at Sherborne and Exeter College, Oxford and ordained in 1909. His first post was as curate at Christ Church, Clifton, Bristol, after which he was secretary of the Church Missionary Society for Public Schools and Young People's Work then Vicar of St Paul's, Bedminster.

== Military service ==
While at Bedminster, Lunt was freed to join the Army Chaplain's Department and served in France and Flanders with the 17th Division on a one-year contract. He experienced the Battles of Arras and Passchendaele, witnessed cavalry attacks, bombardments and the effects of gas and helped with surgical operations, soup kitchens and mass burials. He was awarded the Military Cross (MC) for rescuing wounded soldiers.

== Later ecclesiastical career ==
When peace returned, Lunt became Vicar of All Saints, Northampton then Archdeacon of Egypt. From 1928 he was Vicar of St Mary's, Portsea, Portsmouth, the largest parish of the city, before his appointment to the episcopate as Bishop of Ripon in 1935.

By 1946, Lunt's health was causing concern, and when the Bishop of Southwark turned down the offer of translation to Salisbury, Lunt was offered the post and accepted it. A rural diocese seemed to provide a more amenable setting than Ripon which included the city of Leeds. Unfortunately, Lunt's health did not improve and he died in 1948.

== Marriage and children ==
Lunt was married to Lillias M Sherbrooke (1889-1980) Their son Ronald Geoffrey Lunt (1913-1994) was also a war chaplain who served with 7th commando in Libya; and later the rector of Martley. Lunt's sister, Norah Elisetta Lunt (21/06/1890 - 09/05/1988), married Norman Tubbs in 1918. Tubbs was successively Bishop of Tinnevelly, Bishop of Rangoon, Archdeacon of Chester (and Assistant Bishop of Chester) and Dean of Chester.

Lunt's brother was Theodore Robert Woosnam Lunt (1879-1951).

Lunt's sister Mary (Molly) Baskerville Lunt married Hugh Cecil Jenner (1872-1968) who was descended from Francis Lascelles (1744-1799) and the singer Ann Catley.

Church of England titles
Preceded by Edward Burroughs	Bishop of Ripon; 1935–1946	Succeeded by George Chase
Preceded by Neville Lovett	Bishop of Salisbury; 1946–1948	Succeeded by William Anderson
