= J. P. Deane =

English musician

John Philip Deane (1 January 1796 – 18 December 1849), generally referred to as J. P. Deane, was an English musician in Australia, the first organist of St David's Church, Hobart. Called "the father of music in Australia" and ". . . one of the most important early colonial musicians in [Van Diemen's Land] and [New South Wales]", his family, whose only tutor was their father, were pioneering musicians in Sydney.

== History ==
Deane was born and raised in Richmond, Surrey, England, and was musically trained, though his later claim to membership of the Philharmonic Society of London can at most refer to associate membership, conceivably as a rank-and-file violinist. He was by trade a metal worker, tinsmith or similar. In February 1822 Deane, his wife, and two children, left for Australia, arrived at Hobart, Van Diemen's Land, aboard the brig Deveron in June 1822. He established a business on Bridge Street as a general merchant, selling homewares of all kinds. By one account, he had a business partnership with an unnamed cousin, but abandoned these plans when his partner drowned, and opted for the life of a musician.

St David's Anglican church was built in 1817; its name was chosen to commemorate Colonel David Collins, Lieutenant Governor of Van Diemen's Land. Its first priest was Rev. Robert Knopwood, and its organ (Note: The organ, by John Gray and Son, of London, received extensive maintenance in 1859 at the hands of Jesse Biggs of Melbourne, who later settled in Launceston. The organ was later installed in St Matthew's church, Rokeby, in Clarence Plains.) was imported in 1820, and opened on 15 May 1825 by William Hance.

Deane, who had from 1823 been running the Waterloo Store in Elizabeth Street, and a circulating library of 2500 books with a reading room and bookshop nearby, was a month or so later, appointed church organist, at a salary of £100 per annum. A rift soon arose between the priest and the organist, resulting in Deane withdrawing his services, with the congregation divided as to whom to support. The following decade, in an economic downturn blamed by some on Colonel Arthur's administration, Deane's salary was cut to £50 p.a., then ceased altogether, with his only income tuition fees and concerts, at which his pianist daughter Rosalie was usually among the supporting artists. Valuable additions to Hobart's pool of talent around this time were violinists William Wilkins Russell and George Peck. In 1834 Deane and Russell established a concert hall, "The Argyle Rooms" (Note: No doubt a punning reference to London's Argyll Rooms, closely associated with the Philharmonic Society.) on Argyle Street, attracting 300 people to the opening concert, which featured most of the musical talent of the colony. His financial position continued to slide, and he was reduced to selling off his assets, including his daughter's piano, which had been purchased for the prodigy by public subscription.

Deane was declared insolvent in January 1836, largely due to unpaid accounts, and arrangements were made for a move to affluent Sydney. On 2 February Miss Deane gave a concert for the support of her brothers and sisters, and on 24 March the Deane family gave a farewell concert which was well attended. They sailed to Sydney aboard Black Warrior in April.

=== Sydney ===
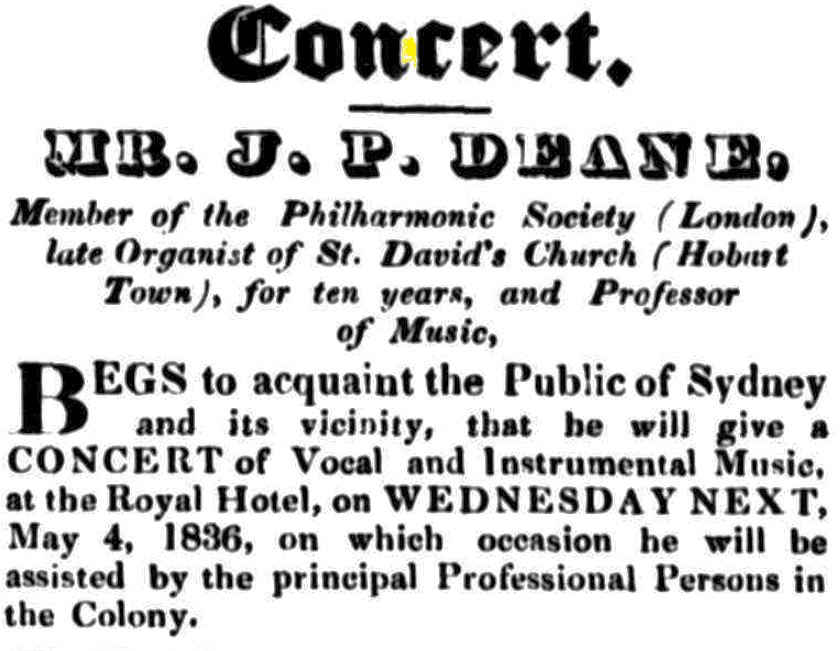
J. P. Deane advert

Their first concert, held at the saloon of the Royal Hotel on 18 May 1836, attracted a good crowd, and were supported by several local artists who gave their services gratis. The advertising also bruited private tuition, for the first time claiming association with the elite (London) Philharmonic Society. In June 1836 Deane founded a (Sydney) Philharmonic Society, with William Vincent Wallace as president and Governor Bourke as patron. A programme of sacred music was presented at the chapel of St Mary's (Catholic) Cathedral, Hyde Park, on 21 September 1836, in aid of the organ fund; Deane and Wallace were key performers. Several similar oratorios were performed in succeeding years. Deane and his family took part in numerous concerts; his daughter Rosalie winning many plaudits; a concert by the Wallace and Deane families in February 1837 was well received. Later that year Deane was appointed leader of the Theatre Royal orchestra. A concert in 1838 at the Royal Hotel, attended by Governor Gipps and Lady Gipps, was well attended and received excellent reviews. Other Deane family concerts were held at the Theatre Royal on 14 July 1841 and the Victoria Theatre on 14 September 1842.

In October 1842 Deane's son John revisited Hobart by the Marian Watson and played at several concerts and in at least one occasion as leader. It is likely he returned to Sydney by the barque Rajah in August 1843. (Note: These references could easily be taken to refer to J. P. Deane.)

Deane advertised his ability to take on students (at his house in O'Connell Street, Sydney) in January 1843 and in September practically pleaded for students in this "present depressed state of affairs" Sydney was enduring a recession, such that "while meat may be bought at a penny and even a half-penny per lb., and every other necessary of life in proportion, there is neither penny nor halfpenny wherewith to procure them".

=== Hobart and Launceston ===
In January 1844 Deane held a farewell concert at the Royal Hotel. and another three days later at Newtown, followed by parties and dancing. Deane sold his Collard & Collard grand piano and other possessions, and in January 1944 left for Hobart by the brig Caroline. Their first concert was held at the Mechanics' Institute in February 1844 followed by concerts in Launceston and towns Green Ponds (modern Kempton), Oatlands, and Campbell Town on the way. In April he gave a brace of farewell concerts. before returning to Sydney by the Caroline in late May 1844.

=== Sydney again ===
Deane and family gave concerts at the City Theatre in September 1844, and two concerts at St. Mary's Church, West Maitland in March 1845. He redoubled his off-concert work: as dealer of musical instruments and tutor; he founded the Sydney Choral Society; he gave public lectures on music. His concerts became, if anything, better presented and more appreciated than ever. In November 1849 he launched what was billed Australia's first promenade concert, although John Gibbs, leader of the Royal Victoria orchestra was earlier.

In 1849 he sold his Broadwood and Sons grand piano. On 17 December 1849 John Deane, junior, left for San Francisco, and the following day his father died of a brief but painful illness, at his home, 110 Elizabeth Street, Sydney. His remains were buried at the Camperdown Cemetery. The gravestone, though broken, is still legible.

== Later history ==
The promenade concerts inaugurated by Deane were continued by his son Edward.

== Family ==
Deane married Rosalie Smith (1799 – 2 June 1873) in 1818. They had at least eight children:

- John Deane (1820 – 13 March 1893) violin, conductor
- Rosalie Deane (1821 – 4 April 1888) piano, highly praised in her youth
- Edward Smith Deane (1824 – 3 September 1879) violin, and music teacher
- William Deane (1826 – 22 November 1910) violin, viola, double bass; partner Deane & Deane, lawyers
- Isabella Deane (1830 – 26 May 1876) married Patrick Lindesay Shepherd MLC.
- Charles Muzio Deane (1832 – 13 July 1915) violin
- Alfred Deane (1834 – 9 December 1849) rarely mentioned, except at the Hobart farewell concert.
- Henry Deane (1836 – 7 March 1922) violin, partner Deane & Deane, lawyers
