= David Gnaniah Pothirajulu =

Bishop in Tamil Nadu, India (1936–2020)

The Right Reverend David Gnaniah Pothirajulu
- Bishop of Madurai-Ramnad
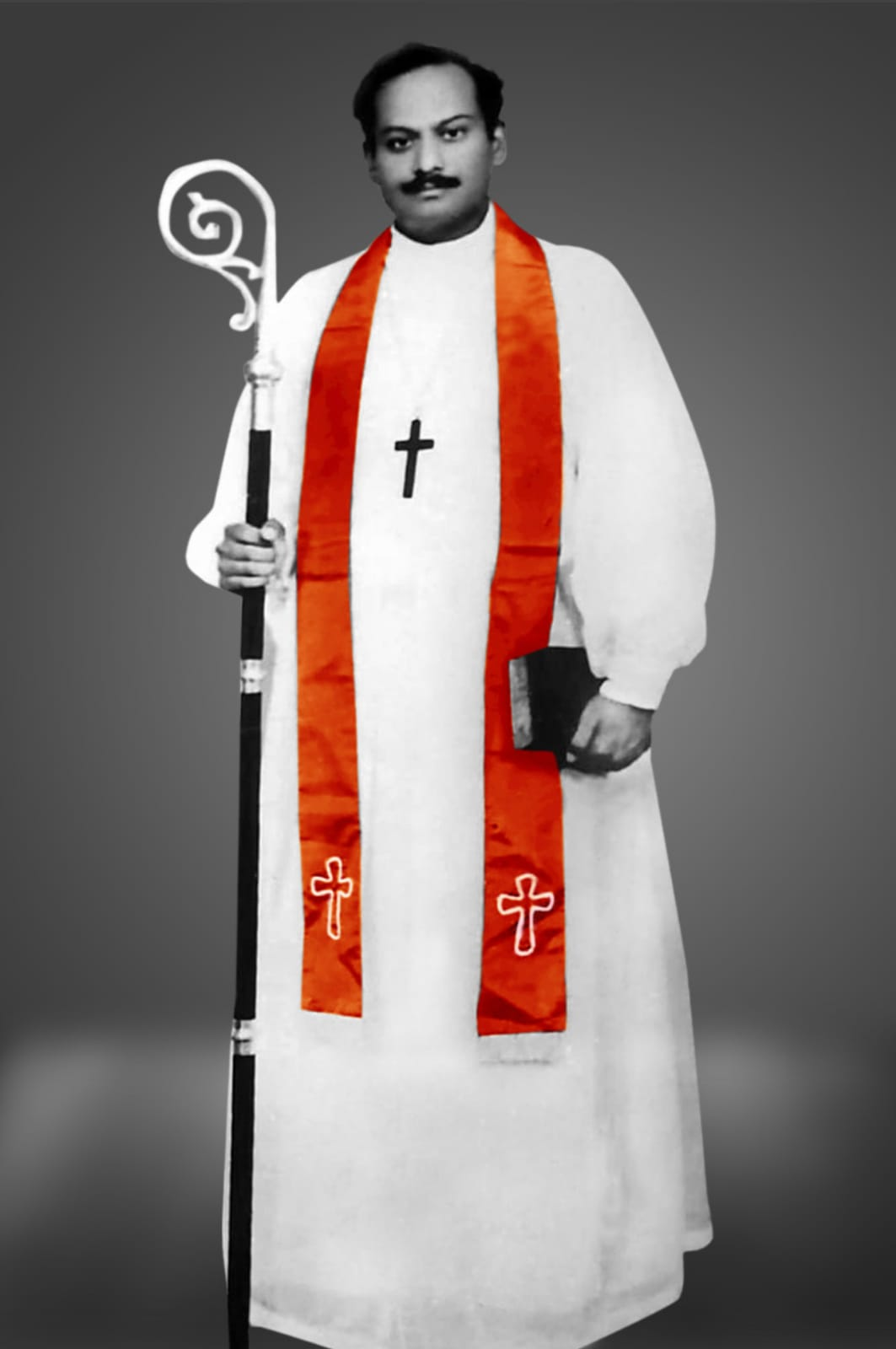
- Pothirajulu at the time of his consecration
- Church: Church of South India
- Diocese: Madurai–Ramnad
- Installed: 1978
- Term ended: 1994
- Predecessor: George Devadass
- Successor: Thavaraj David Eames
- Other posts: Deputy Moderator, Church of South India (1988–1990)

Orders
- Consecration: 19 August 1978

Personal details
- Born: 19 September 1936 Chengalpattu, Tamil Nadu, India
- Died: 5 September 2020 (aged 83) Madurai, Tamil Nadu
- Buried: Madurai
- Denomination: Christian
- Parents: Doraisamy - Ponnuthai
- Spouse: Emma Kohilam (Late), Kasthuri Pothirajulu (Late)
- Children: James Pothirajulu, Joseph Pothirajulu (Late), Mary Iwy Jebaselvi
- Occupation: Bishop
- Profession: Bishop

David Gnaniah Pothirajulu (19 September 1936 – 5 September 2020) was the third bishop in Madurai-Ramnad Diocese of the Church of South India, serving from 1978 to 1994 and was its deputy moderator from 1988 to 1990. Pothirajulu received his DOCTOR OF THEOLOGY (Th.D.) from the Boston University. He was a lecturer at the Tamil Nadu Theological Seminary from 1969 to 1978 until his elevation to the episcopate.

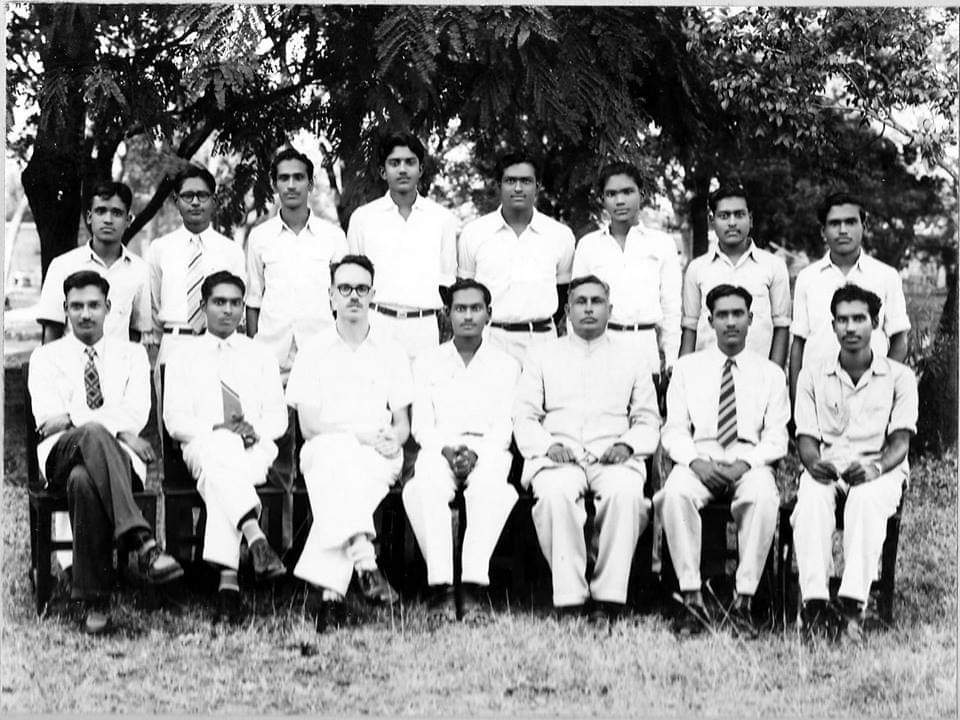
