= Sundar Clarke =

CSI bishop

The Right Reverend Sundar Clarke
- Bishop of Madras
- Church: Church of South India
- Diocese: Madras
- Installed: 1974
- Predecessor: James Edward Lesslie Newbigin
- Successor: Masilamani Azariah

The Rt. Rev. Sundar Clarke (d 2010) was an Indian bishop in the 20th century: he was the Bishop of Madras from 1974 to 1990.
