= Amy Sherwin =

Australian soprano singer (1855–1935)

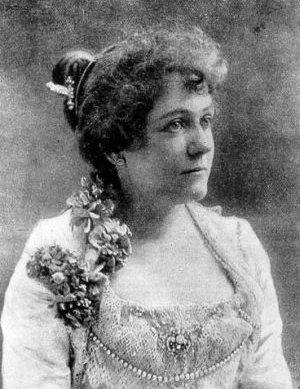
Sherwin, circa 1900

Frances Amy Lillian Sherwin (23 March 1855 – 20 September 1935), known as the 'Tasmanian Nightingale,' was an Australian soprano celebrated for her groundbreaking international opera and concert career. First gaining attention in Don Pasquale in Hobart, she went on to perform in prominent venues such as London’s Royal Opera House and toured with the Carl Rosa Opera Company. Renowned for roles like Lucia in Lucia di Lammermoor, she became a pioneering figure in Australian operatic history.

== Biography ==
She was born at "Forest Home", Huonville, Van Diemen's Land on 23 March 1855, a daughter of George Green Sherwin and Elizabeth Sherwin, née Dean. She was taught singing by her mother and later by Hobart organist Frederick Augustus Packer, who instilled in her a love of opera and oratorio. Her talent was recognised by William Russell, a former Covent Garden conductor, who gave her a part in his operetta Zillah. and pantomime Puss in Boots.

From 1887 to 1889, she toured Australia, New Zealand, Japan, the U.S. and Germany. In 1896, she had a tour in South Africa and was in Australia from 1897 to 1898 and in 1902 and 1903.

In Melbourne she met flautist John Lemmone and contracted him as her accompanist for the remainder of the tour, and when she founded her own Grand Opera company, he was a member. Sherwin had a good soprano voice, but success in Grand Opera eluded her, largely due to her lack of acting ability and the company dismantled, with considerable financial loss. She re-formed her concert party and made another tour of the East to restore her fortunes. Another tour of Australia and Africa followed, Lemmone again in the party. In 1902 and 1906 she made further tours of Australia, then retired. It was around this time that Sherwin and Gorlitz separated.

Amy Sherwin, noted operatic soprano, died here today. She was eighty-one. The singer, who once filled the concert halls of the U.S. with her golden voice and earned as much as 3,000 pounds sterling yearly, died almost forgotten, lonely and penniless. Living in a fine style had depleted her resources and charges of the nursing home where she died had to be paid by charity.

== Family ==
Sherwin married musical agent Hugo Heinrich Ludwig Gorlitz in 1878. They had two children:

- Jeanette Sherwin (born 1894) was a British actress and married James Jolley on 7 March 1923. She contracted tuberculosis, from which she died in Bromley on 8 July 1936, a year after her mother, who had nursed her through a previous crisis.
- Louis Hugo Sherwin married Maude Fealy in secret on 15 July 1907. The couple soon separated and divorced in Denver in 1909. Dramatic critic for the New York Globe, he died in 1978 in Albany, New York.

Sherwin's sisters Lucy Emma Sherwin, later Propsting, and Sarah Elizabeth Sherwin, later Barclay, were both musicians and singers, appearing together in amateur concerts.

James Gleadow Sherwin (c. 1848 – 9 July 1906), son of Isaac Sherwin MLC, was for 20 years secretary of the A.M.P. Society in Launceston, and organist at Christ Church, Frederick Street. He married Amy Richardson on 6 June 1890. A cousin of Amy Sherwin, he has been mis-reported as her father.

== Recognition ==
In 2005 Sherwin was inducted to the Tasmanian Honour Roll of Women for service to the arts. Two life-size statues of Sherwin, in stone and bronze, were unveiled in 2026. The statues were created by Australian sculptor, Peter Schipperheyn, and supported by the Amy Sherwin Fund, led by Bob Brown.
