= Charles Sandys Packer =

Australian composer (1810–1883)

Charles Sandys Stuart Shipley Packer (1810–1883), commonly referred to as Charles S. Packer, was an Australian classical music composer, born in Reading, Berkshire, England. He was a graduate of The Royal Academy of Music in London. Packer was convicted of embezzlement and sentenced to penal transportation to Tasmania in 1839 on the ship Mangles. On release, he became a successful teacher and performer In 1863, he was convicted of bigamy and sentenced to five years' imprisonment in Darlinghurst Gaol with hard labour.

He was accompanist to the Sydney Choral Society, of which Joseph Massey was conductor, meeting at the Sydney School of Arts, and which performed the Handel oratorios Messiah and Judas Maccabaeus with some success.

On 30 November 1871, as organist to the York Street Wesleyan Church, he shared the programme with Frederick Morley at the opening of the Bourke Street Wesleyan Church organ.

He died in poverty in 1883.

== Works ==
- 1855 City of Sydney Polka
- Reminiscence of the garden palace
- The crown of thorns : an oratorio — "his greatest work"
- The royal Charlie polka
- The song of the angels
- Exchange ball schottische
- The captive's child : ballad
- Arm! arm! : Australian patriotic song)
- Little Nell : a ballad
- My Johnny was a shoemaker
- Lily Lee (arrangement)
- Queen of the west : new ballad (orchestration)
- Australia hail! Australian national hymn

== Recordings ==
- 1999 Classical Music Of Colonial Australia - Polka

== Family ==
The organist Frederick Augustus Packer was a nephew.
