= Samuel Morley =

Samuel Morley may refer to:

- Samuel Morley (VC) (1829–1888), recipient of the Victoria Cross
- Samuel Morley (MP) (1809–1886), British Member of Parliament and philanthropist
- Samuel Morley, 1st Baron Hollenden (1845–1929), British businessman
- Samuel Morley (bishop) (1841–1923), Bishop of Tinnevelly
- Sam Morley (Samuel Robertson Morley, 1932–2014), American football player
