= A.R.G.S.T. Barnabas =

Indian religious leader

Rt. Rev. A.R.G.S.T. Barnabas
- Bishop of Tirunelveli Diocese
- Church: Anglican
- Diocese: Tirunelveli Diocese
- See: Church of South India
- In office: 2021–present
- Predecessor: Rt. Rev. Jayapaul David
- Successor: Rt. Rev.J.J.Christhudass.
- Previous post: Council Chairman

Orders
- Ordination: 1985
- Consecration: 21 November 2021
- Rank: Bishop

Personal details
- Born: March 21, 1960 (age 66)

A.R.G.S.T. Barnabas is an Indian religious leader. Since 2021 he has been Bishop of Tirunelveli Diocese.

Rev. Barnabas was born on 21 March 1960, He was educated at St.Jhon's College Manonmaniam Sundaranar University. and was educated at the Union Biblical Seminary in Pune earning BA,BD degrees. He was ordained as a deacon in 1985 and served as presbyter with a service of more than 35 years in churches. The consecration of the Bishop was held at Holy Trinity Cathedral, Palayamkottai on Sunday 21 November 2021. He is the Sixteenth Bishop of the Tirunelveli Diocese.
