= Thomas Garrett (bishop) =

South Indian bishop (died 1980)

The Right Reverend Thomas Garrett
- Bishop in Tirunelveli
- Church: Church of South India
- Diocese: Tirunelveli
- In office: 1971–1974
- Predecessor: Augustine Jebaraj
- Successor: Daniel Abraham
- Other post: Assistant Bishop of Leicester (1975–1980)

Orders
- Ordination: 1937 (deacon); 1938 (priest) by Arthur Winnington-Ingram
- Consecration: 1971

Personal details
- Died: 10 April 1980 Hallaton, Leicestershire, England
- Denomination: Anglican
- Education: Christ's College, Cambridge

Thomas Samuel Garrett (died 10 April 1980) was an Anglican bishop in the Church of South India: he was the Bishop in Tirunelveli from 1971 to 1974.

Garrett attended Christ's College, Cambridge and trained for the ministry at Ridley Hall. He was made deacon in Advent 1937 (19 December) and ordained priest the following Advent (18 December 1938) — both times by Arthur Winnington-Ingram, Bishop of London, at St Paul's Cathedral. He then served his title (curacy) at St Mary, Stoke Newington. He spent 34 years serving with the Church Mission Society; a theological educator, he was Vice-Principal of Tirumaraiyur, 1946–1963. He was also an academic in western Africa, holding a lectureship at the University of Nigeria.

Resigning his See in 1974, he returned to England to serve as Rector of Hallaton, Assistant Bishop of Leicester (from 1975) and an honorary canon of the cathedral.
