= Frederick Morley (organist) =

English Australian organist and music teacher (c. 1850–1929)

Frederick Morley (c. 1850 – 21 April 1929) was an organist and music teacher in Sydney, Australia. He achieved a reputation as organ architect, creating tables of specifications by which many of Sydney's pipe organs were built.

== History ==
Morley was born in England, the third son of Daniel Morley, of Bassingbourne, Cambridgeshire. As a boy he was a chorister at Ely Cathedral and studied music under Dr. George Garrett, organist of St John's College, Cambridge. Theirs was a musical family: His eldest brother, Samuel Morley, Anglican Bishop of Tinnevelly, born 1841, was a capable violinist, and another brother, Felix W. Morley, M.A., Mus. Bac. (died August 1915), was organist of Pembroke College, Cambridge and conductor of the Cambridge Musical Society.

He emigrated to Australia around early 1871, to take the position of organist for the Bourke Street Wesleyan Church. He opened their new organ on 30 November 1871, sharing the programme with C. S. Packer (died 1883), organist to the York Street Wesleyan Church. That organ was the third instrument sent out to the church: the first was purchased "off the floor" at the International Exhibition in London, the manufacture of Jones of Fulham, and despatched to the colonies aboard the ship Walter Hood, which was wrecked off he NSW coast on 24 April 1870. They sent out another, which met a similar fate; the third, on the SS Abergeldie, arrived safely on 28 October 1871.

He succeeded Charles Packer as organist at the Garden Palace in the Botanic Gardens during the Sydney International Exhibition of January 1880, succeeded by Thomas W. Craven. The "Palace", built for the Exhibition, was destroyed by fire in September 1882.

Following a campaign by their, then, organist Emmeline Woolley, and her subsequent fundraising activities, the committee of St John's Anglican Church, Darlinghurst ordered a new three-manual Hill & Son organ. It was installed, as recommended by Woolley, on the floor rather than in the loft by the Sydney firm of Layton Brothers. It was 'opened' on 12 August 1886 by Morley, who had been appointed at some earlier date. Around this time he was gaining a reputation as an organ architect, so it is likely he was responsible for its design:

- He was involved with Alexander Rea and Montague Younger, in designing and ordering the Sydney YMCA organ.
- When the City Council decided to commission "the world's greatest organ" for the Sydney Town Hall, Morley was one of the five Sydney organists (including Rea, Younger and William Henry Nash) on the panel of ten which in 1885 decided every detail of its specifications, tendering process, and installation, independent of the Council.
- He drew up the specifications for the organ at All Saints Anglican Church, Petersham, which he opened in 1886, notably introducing the tubular pneumatic action, which later became standard.
- Morley designed the three-manual A. Hunter & Son organ at St Andrew's Anglican Church, Summer Hill. His brother Felix oversaw the organ's construction at Hunter's Clapham factory. It was opened 22 February 1898.

He resigned after 35 years as organist of St. John's Church, and retired from public life. He died in 1929.

== Other interests ==
He taught music at Burwood Wesleyan Ladies' College from 1887 until 1891, also took private fee-paying students from each of his various addresses.

Morley was one of the founders of the Sydney College of Music, and was an examiner for the College from 1901 to 1922.

Morley was a competitive bowler, a member of the Killara club.

== Compositions ==
"The Old Organist" (1892) dedicated to C. J. Prescott.

== Personal ==
On 17 November 1875 Morley married Lucretia Isabella McClelland, of Newcastle, New South Wales. Their children included:

- F. Barron Morley Frederick Barron Winship Morley (20 September 1876 – 7 December 1959), studied in Vienna 1898–1901, pianist and teacher.
- son 1 November 1879 at 3 Glenwood Terrace, Surry Street
- daughter 13 January 1884, of whom nothing has been found
- Claude Ronald Morley (7 September 1889 – ), analytical chemist w/CSIRO, enlisted 1st AIF 1915; awarded Military Cross October 1918.

They moved house frequently, took fee-paying students from each address:

- 267 Upper Forbes street, Darlinghurst 1876–1878
- 3 Glenwood Terrace, Surry Street, Darlinghurst 1878–1879
- 47 Surry Street 1879–1887
- 312 Victoria Street (opposite St John's Church) 1887–1889
- "Bassingbourne", 334 Victoria street 1889–1904

He retired to Blenheim Road, Lindfield
