= Marialouis Joseph =

CSI bishop

The Right Reverend Marialouis Joseph
- Bishop of Madurai-Ramnad
- Church: Church of South India
- Diocese: Madurai-Ramnad
- Installed: 2013
- Predecessor: Christopher Asir

Marialouis Joseph is the sixth Bishop of Madurai-Ramnad, serving since his consecration in 2013.
