= Madurai-Ramnad Diocese of the Church of South India =

Diocese of the Church of South India in Tamil Nadu, India

Diocese of Madurai Ramnad

Location
- Country: India
- Ecclesiastical province: Church of South India

Information
- Cathedral: CSI Cathedral, Madurai

Current leadership
- Bishop: Rt.Rev.Dr.D.Jeyasingh Prince Prabhakaran

Website
- www.csidmr.com

The Madurai-Ramnad Diocese is a diocese of Church of South India in Tamil Nadu state of India. The diocese is one among the 24 dioceses of Church of South India, a United Protestant denomination.

== History ==
The diocese was one among the initial 14 dioceses already existing at the time of formation of Church of South India in 1947.

== About the Diocese ==
The diocese comprises following six districts Madurai, Dindigul, Virudhunagar, Theni, Sivagangai, and Ramanathapuram in Tamil Nadu state. The cathedral church of the diocese is situated at Narimedu, Madurai.

== Bishops ==
- 1947–1959: Lesslie Newbigin
- 1959–1978: George Devadass
- 1978–1994: David Gnaniah Pothirajulu
- 1996–2004: Thavaraj David Eames
- 2004–2012: Christopher Asir
- 2013–2022: Marialouis Joseph
- 2022–present: Jeyasingh Prince Prabhakaran

== Notable churches ==
- CSI Cathedral Church, Narimedu, Madurai

The Cathedral church at Madurai is the biggest Cathedral in South East Asia, sprawling over a four-acre site which is built in Gothic style combined with architectural elegance, Tamil culture and theological significance. It was built during the Rt. Rev. Dr. David Pothirajulu from donations from across the diocese. It was dedicated on the Easter Day, 30 March 1986 by the then CSI moderator, Rt.Rev.Dr. I. Jesudasan.

- Mary Clara Memorial Church, Melur, Madurai District
- Abishehanather CSI Church, Sivaganga (North)
- C.S.I Webb Memorial Church, Ponn

agaram, Madurai

C.S.I church of divine Glory, Manamadurai,

== Educational institutions under the diocese ==
- C.S.I.Bishop Christopher Asir memorial College of Dental Science and Research, Madurai
- C.S.I College of Arts and Science for Women, K.Pudur, Madurai
- C.S.I Jeyaraj Annapackiam College of Nursing & Allied Sciences, Pasumalai, Madurai
- C.S.I Industrial Training Center, Pasumalai, Madurai
- C.S.I College of Education Pasumalai, Madurai-04
- C.S.I.College of Education, Ramnad
- C.S.I. Teacher Training Institute, Batlagundu
- C.S.I. Teacher Training Institute, Thirumangalam, Madurai

== See also ==
- Church of South India
- Tirunelveli Diocese
- Diocese of Madras
- Diocese of Coimbatore
- Christianity in Tamil Nadu
- Diocese of Kanyakumari
- Church of North India
- Christianity in India
