= George Devadass =

CSI bishop

The Right Reverend George Devadass
- Bishop ofMadurai-Ramnad
- Church: Church of South India
- Diocese: East Kerela
- Installed: 1959
- Predecessor: Lesslie Newbigin
- Successor: David Gnaniah Pothirajulu

George Devadass was the second Bishop of Madurai-Ramnad, serving from 1959 to 1978.

Before his elevation to the episcopate he served at Tambaram.
