= Jeevaanandam Thangamuthu =

Jeevaanandam Thangamuthu was the third Bishop of Coimbatore.
