= Augustine Jebaraj =

South Indian bishop

The Right Reverend Augustine Jebaraj
- Bishop of Tirunelveli
- Church: Church of South India
- Diocese: Tirunelveli
- Installed: 1953
- Predecessor: George Selwyn
- Successor: Jeyapaul David

Augustine Jebaraj was an Anglican bishop in the Church of South India: he was the Bishop of Tirunelveli from 1953 to 1970.
