= Jeyapaul David =

South Indian bishop

The Right Reverend Jeyapaul David
- Bishop of Tirunelveli
- Church: Church of South India
- Diocese: Tirunelveli
- Installed: 2000
- Predecessor: Jason Dharmaraj
- Successor: JJ Christdoss

Personal details
- Born: 1944

Jeyapaul David (11 August 1944 – 8 February 2017) was an Anglican bishop in the Church of South India: he was the Bishop of Tirunelveli from 2000 to 2009.

David was educated at Serampore College and St John's College, Nottingham. He was ordained in 1969. He was the editor of the Indian Journal of Missiology; Organizing Secretary of the National Missionary Society from 1982 to 1985; General Secretary of the Indian Missionary Society from 1990 to 1992 and Professor of Leadership Training at Yavatmal College.
