= Jason Dharmaraj =

South Indian bishop

The Right Reverend Jason S Dharmaraj
- Bishop of Tirunelveli
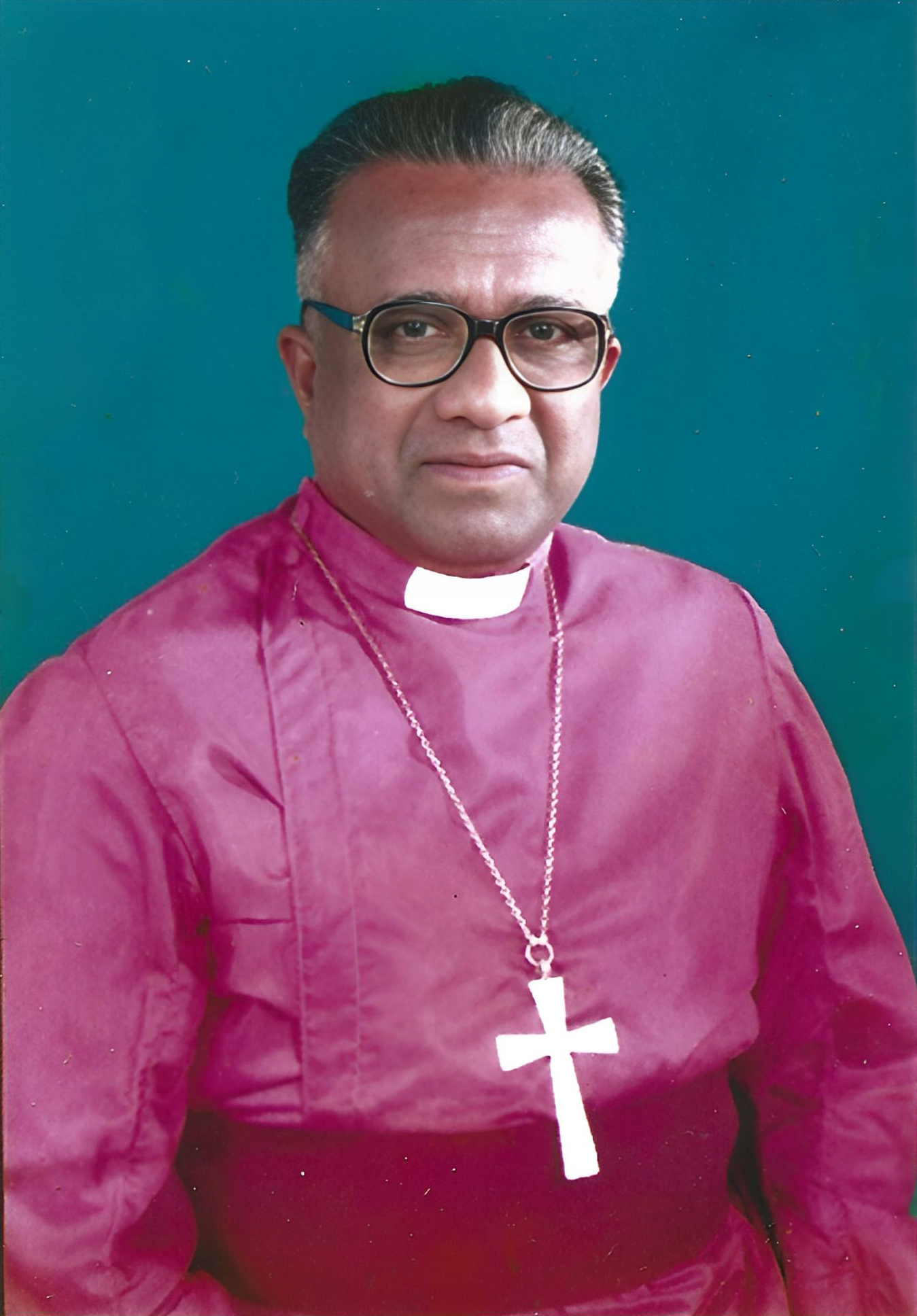
- Church: Church of South India
- Diocese: Tirunelveli
- Installed: 1985
- Term ended: 1999
- Predecessor: Daniel Abraham
- Successor: Jeyapaul David

Personal details
- Born: 18 October 1934
- Died: 23 April 2006 (aged 71)

Jason S Dharmaraj was an Anglican bishop in the Church of South India: he was the Bishop of Tirunelveli from 1985 to 1999.
