= William Morley =

William Morley may refer to:

== Sports ==
- Tony Morley (William Anthony Morley, born 1954), English former football player
- Bill Morley (baseball) (1890–1985), Major League Baseball second baseman
- Bill Morley (1876–1932), American football player

== Others ==
- William Morley (died 1597) (1531–1597), English MP for Lewes
- William Morley (1606–1658), English MP for Guilford and Chester
- William Morley (1653–1679), English MP for Lewes
- William Morley (1666–c.1694), English MP for Arundel
- Sir William Morley (1639–1701), English MP for Midhurst
- William Morley (composer) (1680? –1721), English composer
- William Hook Morley (1815–1860), English barrister and orientalist
- William Morley (New Zealand methodist) (1842–1926), New Zealand methodist minister and historian
- William James Morley (1847–1930), English architect
- William Fenton Morley (1912–1995), English Dean of Salisbury

== Barons Morley ==
- William de Morley, 1st Baron Morley (died c. 1302)
- William Lovel, 7th Baron Morley (died 1476)
- William Parker, 13th Baron Morley (c. 1575 – 1622)
