= Iain Morley =

British Judge

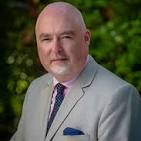
Iain Morley KC

Iain Charles Morley KC (born 1965, Dublin) is a British barrister and currently a Resident Judge of Saint Kitts and Nevis.

== Legal career ==
Mr Justice Morley received his law degree from Lady Margaret Hall, Oxford University and was then Called to the Bar in 1988 by Inner Temple. He undertook a common law pupillage in 1989 before becoming a specialist criminal practitioner, predominantly from 23 Essex Street Chambers, London. One of his most high-profile cases was the murder of Sarah Payne in 2001. Morley took Silk in April 2009, then among two first British barristers to do so whilst practicing international criminal law.

He spent 2004 to 2012 practising in international criminal law before various tribunals, having appeared in nineteen jurisdictions. Morley was in 2004 for six months part of the defence team of Slobodan Milosevic at the International Criminal Tribunal for the Former Yugoslavia (ICTY) in The Hague. He then prosecuted genocide at the International Criminal Tribunal for Rwanda (ICTR) in Arusha, Tanzania from 2005. In April 2009, Morley was appointed the Senior Trial Counsel at the UN Special Tribunal for Lebanon (STL) in the Hague to prosecute the assassination of Lebanese Prime Minister Rafik Hariri.

In 2012, Morley returned to domestic practice from 23 Essex Street Chambers, predominantly prosecuting and defending in murder, drugs and fraud cases. He continued to assist with international matters, including acting pro bono.

In 2016 he was appointed by the Eastern Caribbean Supreme Court to the High Court of Antigua and Barbuda, where until 2021 he sat mostly on criminal cases, and was an architect of sentencing guidelines and a model sexual offences court for the Caribbean region. He also sat during 2016 to 2023 as the designated Judge of Montserrat. In 2021, he became the senior Judge of St Kitts and Nevis, sitting in serious criminal cases, and from January 2026 has been appointed the resident judge on Nevis.

It has been announced that Mr Justice Morley will be reassigned to Dominica from September 2026.

He has often taught advocacy for the Inner Temple, the international advanced advocacy course at Keble College, Oxford and in Leiden University, amongst many other institutions, and is recognised as a leading authority on advocacy skills. He wrote "The Devil's Advocate" in 2005, which is now in its third print edition and is a world best-selling advocacy book for lawyers of domestic and international jurisdictions.
