= Indian Ecclesiastical Establishment =

The Indian Ecclesiastical Establishment was created in 1813 to provide Anglican priests for that part of the British Empire. It initially operated under the auspices of the East India Company. The Sees of Madras and Bombay were added to that of Calcutta in 1833. Later they became employees of the Governments of the Presidencies of Bengal, Madras and Bombay. It was abolished in 1948.
