= Samuel Morley (bishop) =

The Rt Rev Samuel Morley was Bishop of Tinnevelly at the turn of the nineteenth and twentieth centuries.

He was born in 1841 into a musical family: a younger brother Felix W. Morley (died August 1915), was organist of Pembroke College, Cambridge and conductor of the Cambridge Musical Society. Another, Frederick Morley (c. 1850–1929), was an organist and music teacher in Sydney, Australia; his son F. Barron Morley was a celebrated pianist. Morley was himself a capable violinist.

He was educated at Pembroke College, Cambridge. After curacies at Ilkeston and Sandgate, he emigrated to India as a CMS missionary, eventually becoming Domestic Chaplain to the Bishop of Madras before his elevation to the episcopate in 1896. He retired in 1903 and died twenty years later on 6 November 1923.

Church of England titles
Preceded by In abeyance	Bishop of Tinnevelly; 1896 – 1903	Succeeded by Arthur Acheson Williams
