= Morley Muse =

Nigerian-born renewable energy engineer

- Born: Nigeria
- Education: University of South Wales
- Alma mater: Victoria University
- Known for: Sustainable Technology
- Title: Dr

Morley Muse is an Australian renewable energy engineer, and co-founder of iSTEM, a social enterprise supporting women in STEM into STEM education, employment, leadership and entrepreneurship. She won the 2022 Emerging Leader in STEM award from Women's Agenda, and also is a past member of the ATSE Elevate Advisory group.

== Early life and education ==
Muse received a Bachelor of Engineering at the University of Nottingham, and then a Masters of Sustainable Power Technology, at the University of South Wales, after her interest in sustainable energy started at age 14, in Nigeria, to a visit with a Junior Engineers Technicians and Scientists Club. During one of these visits, the importance of mitigating spillage of crude oil, and finding alternative energy solutions was highlighted. She moved to Australia as part of the Skilled Migration Program. Muse then completed a PhD in renewable energy at Victoria University.

== Career ==
Muse co-founded the Women in Science and Engineering Club at Victoria University, with the goal of empowering students and girls to follow careers in STEM. Muse is a board director of Women in STEMM Australia, as well as an advisory panel member for Elevate Women in STEM Program, within the Australian Academy of Technological Sciences and Engineering.

Muse is the co-founder of iSTEM, together with Dr Ruwangi Fernando, a talent-sourcing and research company which enables the employment of women in STEM, and also including women of colour and women and non-binary people who come from culturally and linguistically diverse backgrounds.

Muse was also an ambassador for CSIRO's Innovation Catalyst Global, which hosts the Find Her tool to connect women academics with industry partners. Muse also has three sons, and wakes at 5:00 am to meditate. Her research focuses on microalgae anaerobic hydrolosis, as well as using potential digestion utilising bacteria and enzymes. The conversion of microalgae waste from wastewater to biodiesel, using transesterification, will allow more sustainable sources of energy, and potentially develop new power sources.

Muse has published numerous articles on STEMM trends, representation in post-graduate science on Medium. Muse lists one her proudest moments as follows:

"Winning the Emerging Leader in STEM award at the Women's Agenda 2022 Awards. This recognition came as a surprise & filled me with gratitude for the impact my work has made in the STEM community. As a woman of colour, receiving such a prestigious award inspired me to be a positive role model for the younger generation of women in STEM. It humbled me to know that I could inspire others."

== Awards ==
- 2022 – Emerging Leader in STEM award, Women's Agenda
- 2022 – Finalist, Victoria University Alumni Awards under the Rising Star category
- 2022 – Lift Women social impact award for iSTEM
- 2022 – Finalist, Digital Workforce: Skills for the Future powered by Queensland Government (Department of Communities, Housing & Digital Economy)
- 2023 – Finalist for the CEO/Board Category at the Australian Gender Equity Awards
- 2023 – Winner of the Equity in Innovation Award at the Startup Burning Heroes for the DEIR.AI Recruit-Tech platform for women in STEM
- 2024 – Winner for 2024 AusMumpreneur Awards in the Social Enterprise Excellence category
