= Masilamani Azariah =

CSI bishop

The Right Reverend Masilamani Azariah
- Bishop of Madras
- Church: Church of South India
- Diocese: Madras
- Installed: 1990
- Predecessor: Sundar Clarke
- Successor: Vedanayagam Devasahayam

The Rt. Rev. Masilamani Azariah (1934 - 2012) was an Indian bishop in the 20th century: he was the Bishop of Madras from 1990 to 1999. The Church of South India Synod announced his death in 2012.
