= Edward Waller (bishop) =

Anglican bishop

Edward Harry Mansfield Waller (8 December 1871 – 16 May 1942) was an eminent Anglican clergyman in the first half of the 20th century.

He was born 8 December 1871 and educated at Highgate and Corpus Christi College, Cambridge. Ordained in 1894, he was successively assistant chaplain and vice principal of St Paul's Divinity School, Allahabad, principal of Jay Narayan's School, Benares, secretary of the CMS (Indian Group) and canon of Lucknow before his elevation to the episcopate as the 3rd bishop of Tinnevelly. In 1923 he was translated to Madras, where he served for a further 18 years. He died on 16 May 1942.

== Notes ==
Church of England titles
Preceded by Arthur Acheson Williams	Bishop of Tinnevelly; 1915 – 1922	Succeeded by Norman Henry Tubbs
Preceded by Henry Whitehead	Bishop of Madras; 1923 – 1941	Succeeded by Arthur Michael Hollis
