= William Wilkins Russell =

English musician

William Wilkins Russell (1807 – 3 October 1892), was an English musician who settled in Van Diemen's Land, now known as Tasmania, Australia, and did much for the musical culture of the colony. He is remembered for his "discovery" of the soprano Amy Sherwin.

== History ==
Russell was born in Surrey, England, a son of William Russel Wilkins and baptised at St Mary's, Lambeth, on 1 November 1807. His musical career in England included a stint as Covent Garden conductor.

He arrived in Tasmania in June 1832 aboard the ship Medway, captain Borthwick Wight, and soon began advertising his services as a teacher of music. In 1834 he was associated with John Philip Deane in establishing a concert hall "The Argyle Rooms" in Argyle Street. before leaving for London aboard Duckenfield, Captain Riddle. He returned to Tasmania aboard Derwent, again Captain Riddle, most likely in February 1837.

He succeeded the insolvent Deane (and his replacement, Mrs Logan) as organist and choirmaster of St David's Cathedral, Hobart in January 1838, but found his remuneration inadequate and resigned. His place was taken by Mrs Elliott, then in 1852 by the 17-year-old Miss Bonney. After several months of bickering, in which neither the Rev. Dr Bedford nor Bonney's father was guiltless, she was suspended, then forced to resign. Frederick Alexander Packer R.A.M. (died 2 July 1862), newly arrived in the colony, took her place.

Russell then served for over 40 years as organist of St John's Church, New Town, and when Anglicanism lost its status as the Established Church, was placed on a government pension. He made a local reputation as composer of the operetta Zillah; the gypsy brigands of Astorga, in which Amy Sherwin made her first stage appearance. A concert, bringing together Zilla and Maritana at "Del Sarte's Rooms" (later Oddfellows' Hall) in Hobart was well received.

The story of Zillah: Once upon a time the Castle de Spinosa was plundered by the brigand Cortez, who kidnapped the infant daughter of Count Sebastian. The countess died shortly after, and the Count, not caring whether he lived or died, went off to war and was killed on the battlefield. Cortez, unable to collect the expected ransom, gave the child to his mother, who named her Zillah and brought her up in the mountain lair; she grew up to become a handsome woman who came to the attention of a Spanish nobleman, who eventually married her.

The operetta was staged again, at the Theatre Royal in July 1877 to a large and appreciative audience, which included the Governor, Frederick Weld, and his family. It had another airing at the Theatre Royal in July 1883

Russell contributed articles on the subject of colonial arts to the English press. He died peacefully at his home in Shag Bay, Tasmania, never having had a day's sickness in his life.

== Family ==
Russell married Sarah Ann Petchey (5 October 1819 – 24 July 1900), at New Town, Hobart, on 6 March 1838. Their children include:

- Elizabeth Petchey Russell (24 July 1840 – 6 September 1908) married Henry Edward Beaumont Read
- John Petchey Russell (1845–1911) married Tryphena Albina Smith (5 August 1855 – 12 May 1926) on 22 March 1874.
- George Byworth Russell (25 August 1847 – 28 January 1915) married Ermina S. S. Lucas on 24 March 1875
- Emma Amelia Byworth Russell (16 August 1849 – 1928). She was a teacher of music and singing in Perth.
- Frances Annie "Fanny" Russell (1855? c. 1860–1925)
- Margaret Mary Ann (or Annie) Russell (1859? 1862–1935) married Edward Webster on 7 November 1888
- (Henry Percival) Trevor Russell (c. 1863 – 17 January 1923)

Which son lost an arm as the result of a firearm accident?

He had a brother, John Wilkins Russell (1826– ), who arrived in Hobart in 1835 aboard Derwent and returned to England sometime around 1845. He married Frances Mary Huddart at St Mary's church, Lambeth, Surrey, on 30 October 1849.
