= Frederick Western =

Frederick James Western (24 February 1880 – 24 November 1951) was the fifth Anglican Bishop of Tinnevelly in the mid-20th century.

He was educated at Marlborough and Trinity College, Cambridge. He joined the Cambridge Mission to Delhi in 1904 and was ordained twelve years later becoming its Head in 1918. From 1923 to 1929 he was a Canon Residentiary of the Cathedral Church of the Resurrection, Lahore after which he was appointed to the episcopate. He was buried on 30 November 1951.

Church of England titles
Preceded by Norman Tubbs	Bishop of Tinnevelly; 1929–1938	Succeeded by Stephen Neill
