= Norman Tubbs =

Norman Henry Tubbs (5 July 1879 – 2 September 1965) was an Anglican bishop in the 20th century.

== Biography ==
Tubbs was educated at Highgate School and Gonville and Caius College, Cambridge. He was ordained in 1903 and was a curate at Whitechapel Parish Church before going to India as a Church Mission Society missionary, eventually becoming principal of Bishop’s College, Calcutta.

In 1923 Tubbs was ordained to the episcopate as the 4th Bishop of Tinnevelly. He was translated to be Bishop of Rangoon in 1928 and returned to England six years later to be the Archdeacon of Chester (and Assistant Bishop of Chester) and later Dean of Chester.

== Marriage and children ==
In 1918 Tubbs married Norah Elisetta Lunt (21/06/1890 - 09/05/1989), sister of Geoffrey Lunt, later Bishop of Ripon and subsequently Salisbury. They had three sons and a daughter: John LIONEL, Peter Alfred (also a priest), Christoper Norman, Barbara Evelyn.

Tubbs was the father of The Reverend Canon Christopher Norman Tubbs (1926–2010), Vicar of Scalby, North Yorkshire from 1959 to 1995, Rural Dean of Scarborough from 1976 to 1982 and a Canon of York Minster. Christopher was ordained by his father in Chester Cathedral in 1952.

Church of England titles
Preceded by Edward Waller	Bishop of Tinnevelly; 1923–1928	Succeeded by Frederick Western
Preceded by Rollestone Fyffe	Bishop of Rangoon; 1928–1934	Succeeded by George West
Preceded by Paige Cox	Archdeacon of Chester; 1934–1937	Succeeded by Richard Burne
Preceded by Frank Bennett	Dean of Chester; 1937–1953	Succeeded by Michael Gibbs
