= Arthur Williams (bishop) =

Arthur Acheson Williams (1848–?) was the second Bishop of Tinnevelly in the last decades of the 19th century and the first two of the 20th.

He was educated at Trinity College, Dublin and ordained in 1870. He was then held curacies at Bromley and St John the Evangelist, Penge. Emigrating to India he became Chaplain of St George's Cathedral, Madras and then the incumbent at Vellore. His last post before appointment to the episcopate was as Archdeacon of Madras.

Anglican Communion titles
Preceded by Samuel Morley	Bishop of Tinnevelly; 1905–1914	Succeeded by Edward Waller
