= Elizabeth Morley =

British artist

- Occupation: Silversmith
- Years active: 1794–1807
- Known for: Georgian silverware
- Notable work: Tea caddy spoon (1797), toddy ladle (1802)
- Spouse: Thomas Morley
- Awards: Works held by Victoria & Albert Museum, National Museum of Women in the Arts, Sterling and Francine Clark Art Institute

Elizabeth Morley was an English silversmith.

Morley was married to the plateworker Thomas Morley, going into the silver business at his death. During her career she was described variously as a smallworker, cutler, toy dealer, goldsmith, and silversmith. She first registered a mark on 8 August 1794; further marks followed on 19 July 1796 and 1 October 1800. Furthermore she registered a Sun Insurance Policy on 15 April 1797, with another on 15 April 1807. Her address in London was given as 7 Westmoreland buildings, Aldersgate Street.

The Victoria and Albert Museum owns a variety of pieces by Morley, including a collection of bottle tickets of various sorts. Three pieces are in the collection of the National Museum of Women in the Arts; a George III tea caddy spoon of 1797, another of 1798, and a George III toddy ladle of 1802. Several pieces are owned by the Sterling and Francine Clark Art Institute as well.
