= Timothy Ravinder =

Indian bishop

Timothy Ravinder Dev Pradeep
- Former Bishop of CSI Coimbatore Diocese
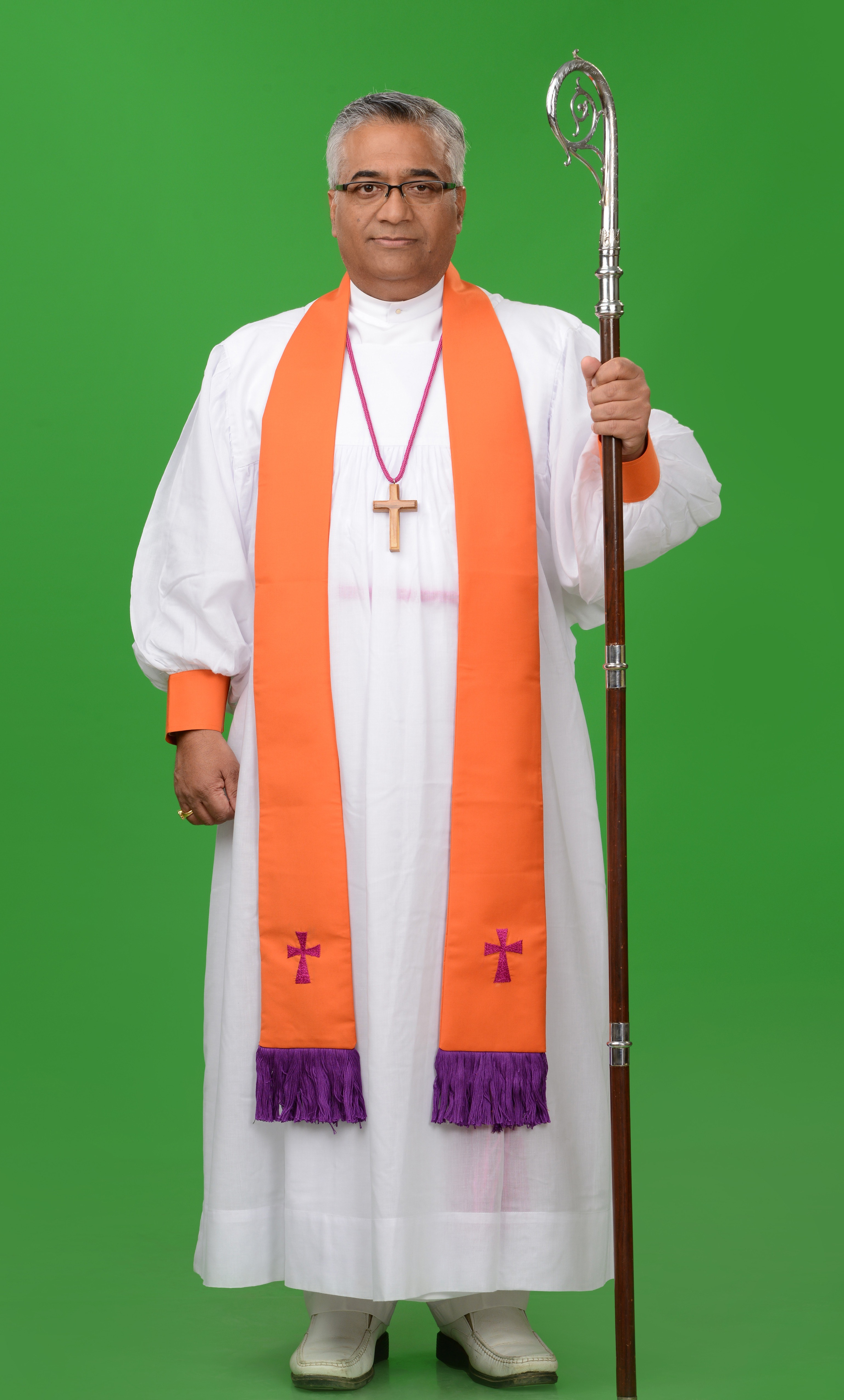
- Church: Christian
- See: Church of South India
- In office: from 2013 to 22-12-2025
- Predecessor: Manickam Dorai
- Successor: Incumbent
- Previous posts: Liaison Officer, CSI-EMS India Desk, Chennai

Orders
- Ordination: 1997 by William Moses
- Consecration: 28 September 2013

Personal details
- Born: 20 December 1958 (age 67) Ketti, Nilgiris district, Madras State (now Tamil Nadu), India
- Website: www.bptravinder.com

Timothy Ravinder Dev Pradeep is the former Bishop of Coimbatore Diocese of Church of South India.

== Early years ==
Timothy Ravinder Dev Pradeep was born on 20 December 1958 to S. Timothy and Emily Jane and was brought up in Ketti, a small village south of Ooty in Nilgiris district of present-day Tamil Nadu. He completed his primary education from The Laidlaw Memorial School of St. George's Homes, Ketti.

He took the pre-university course at Kongunadu Arts and Science College, Coimbatore. He did his graduate course in B.Sc. Physics at the University of Madras from Sri Ramakrishna Mission Vidyalaya. He completed a theological degree B.D. from the United Theological College, Bangalore, India (1991 to 1996). Subsequent to this he was selected to take an autumn course in New Testament studies at the Copenhagen University in Denmark. In 2003 Ravinder was deputed by the Church of South India from the Coimbatore diocese to work with the Protestant Church in Baden, Germany from 2003 to 2008 where he studied German Language, under The European Language Certificates, Communications and Competence in Rheinfelden Baden, Germany.

Timothy Ravinder Dev Pradeep is married to Anny Hemalatha. He has two children.

== Elevation to Bishopric ==
Timothy Ravinder Dev Pradeep was consecrated as the 6th bishop in Coimbatore Diocese of the Church of South India on 28 September 2013 by Most Rev Devakadasham, Moderator, Church of South India.
