= Diocese of Coimbatore of the Church of South India =

Diocese of the Church of South India in Tamil Nadu, India

Diocese of Coimbatore

Location
- Country: India
- Ecclesiastical province: Church of South India

Statistics
- Congregations: 105
- Members: 150000

Information
- Cathedral: Immanuel Cathedral, Coimbatore
- Secular priests: 112

Current leadership
- Bishop: S. Prince Calvin

The Coimbatore Diocese is one of the 32 dioceses of the Church of South India (CSI), a United Protestant denomination.

== Overview ==
CSI Coimbatore Diocese is the largest in terms of area, covering the Nilgiri, Coimbatore, Erode, Salem, Namakkal, Dharmapuri and Krishnagiri.

The diocese has 105 pastorates, 112 pastors and a membership of 150,000.

== Bishops ==
1. Aiyadurai Jesudasen Appasamy (1950-1959)
2. S. J. Samuel
3. Jeevaanandam Thangamuthu
4. William Moses
5. Manickam Dorai (2000-2010)
6. Timothy Ravinder Dev Pradeep (2013– (22-12-2025))
7. S. Prince Calvin (from 23-12-2025)

== Cathedral and other major CSI churches ==
=== Coimbatore ===
- CSI Immanuel Church, Avinashi Road, Coimbatore

CSI Immanuel church is the cathedral church of the diocese. The church is one among the oldest churches in Coimbatore built in the year of 1830. The church is located in Avinashi road at Gopalapuram. The church underwent a major renovation work in the year 2006.

- CSI Christ Church, Coimbatore

The foundation was laid on 15 October 1898 by Frederick Gell, Bishop of Madras and the church was dedicated on 11 June 1910. The church was extended in the year 1970.

- Christ Church, Coimbatore

=== Nilgiris ===
- St. Stephen's Church, Ooty

St. Stephen's Church is located on the road to Mysore in Ooty and it is one of the oldest churches in the Nilgiris district.

- Wesley Church, Coonoor
- C.S.I WEesley Church Hulical Pastorate, Glendale Estate, Coonoor

=== Salem ===
- Christ Church, Salem

Christ Church is located on Fort Road, near the District Collectorate, in the heart of Salem City, Tamil Nadu, India. The church has been serving the community for the last 140 years, since its consecration in 1875. The church services at Christ Church are conducted both in English and Tamil. The church was designed by architect Robert Fellowes Chisholm, who was a pioneer of the Indo-Saracenic architecture, and also designed the Senate House buildings of the University of Madras and the Madras Presidency College

== Educational institutions ==
Arts & Science Colleges

- Bishop Appasamy College of Arts and Science
- Bishop Appasamy College of Education

Engineering College

- CSI College of Engineering, Ketti

Polytechnic College

- CSI Polytechnic College, Salem

Technical College

- CSI Technical and Vocational Training College for Women, Avinashi Road, Coimbatore

Teacher Training Institute

- CSI Teacher Training Institute for Women, Hasthampatti, Salem

Primary and secondary education

- Nursery schools -13
- Primary and middle schools -69
- High schools -5
- Higher secondary Schools -10
- Matriculation schools-3

Matriculation higher secondary schools

- CSI Boys Higher Secondary School (Formerly Known as London Mission High School & Union High School), Coimbatore
- CSI Girls Higher Secondary School, Coimbatore
- CSI CMM Higher Secondary School, Ooty

Kindergarten teacher training

- Kindergarten Teacher Training Institute, Gopalapuram, Coimbatore

== Medical institutions ==
Hospitals

- CSI Kosha Hospital, Erode.
- Herbert Brough Memorial Hospital, Chennimalai.

School of Nursing

- CSI School of Nursing, Erode.

== Controversies ==
- Bishop arrested
- Sale of land
- Money laundering
- Protest against bifurcation, 2023
- Elections on hold

== See also ==
Anglican

- Church of South India
- Trichy-Tanjore Diocese
- Tirunelveli Diocese
- Madurai-Ramnad Diocese
- Diocese of Madras
- Kanyakumari Diocese

General and other denominations

- Christianity in Tamil Nadu
- Roman Catholic Diocese of Coimbatore
- Christianity in India
