= JJ Christdoss =

South Indian bishop

The Right Reverend JJ Christdoss
- Bishop of Tirunelveli
- Church: Church of South India
- Diocese: Tirunelveli
- Installed: 2009

Personal details
- Born: 1953 (age 72–73)

JJ Christdoss is a former Anglican bishop in the Church of South India.He served as the Bishop of Tirunelveli from 2009 to 2021.

Christdoss was born on 31 March 1953 at Korampallam. He was educated at Tamil Nadu Theological Seminary. Christdoss was ordained as a Deacon in 1986 and as a priest in 1987. He is married and has three daughters.
