= George Selwyn (bishop of Tinnevelly) =

George Theodore Selwyn (30 July 1887 – 30 May 1957) was an eminent priest in the middle part of the 20th century.

He was educated at St Lawrence College, Ramsgate and Corpus Christi College, Cambridge. After a curacy at St Matthew's, Bayswater, he emigrated to India as a CMS missionary, eventually becoming principal of St John's College, Palamcottah and then Bishop of Tinnevelly in 1945. He retired in 1953 and died four years later.

Church of England titles
| Preceded by Stephen Neill | Bishop of Tinnevelly; 1945–1953 | Not replaced |
