= George Stephen Jayaraj =

Indian bishop

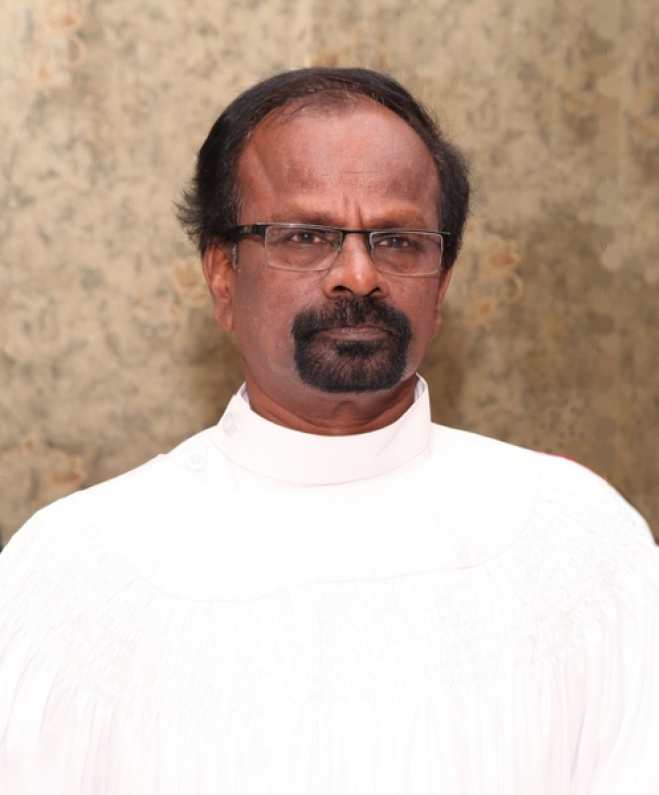

George Stephen Jayaraj was consecrated Bishop of the Madras Diocese of the Church of South India (CSI) by G. Dyvasirvadam, Moderator, CSI on 19 March 2016 at St. George's Cathedral, Chennai. He became the thirteenth Bishop of the Madras Diocese.

J. George Stephen, was brought up in a small village named Cheyyur close to Arakkonam. He was ordained as a Presbyter in 1984, and has served in churches in urban and rural parishes.

Jayaraj is married to N. Yamuna and has two daughters.
