= Daniel Abraham (bishop) =

South Indian bishop

The Right Reverend Daniel Abraham
- Bishop of Tirunelveli
- Church: Church of South India
- Diocese: Tirunelveli
- Installed: 2000
- Predecessor: Thomas Garrett
- Successor: Jason Dharmaraj

Personal details
- Born: 1975 (age 50–51)

Daniel Abraham was an Anglican bishop in the Church of South India: he was the Bishop of Tirunelveli from 1975 to 1984.
