= Diocese of Madras of the Church of South India =

Diocese of the Church of South India in Tamil Nadu, India

Diocese of Madras
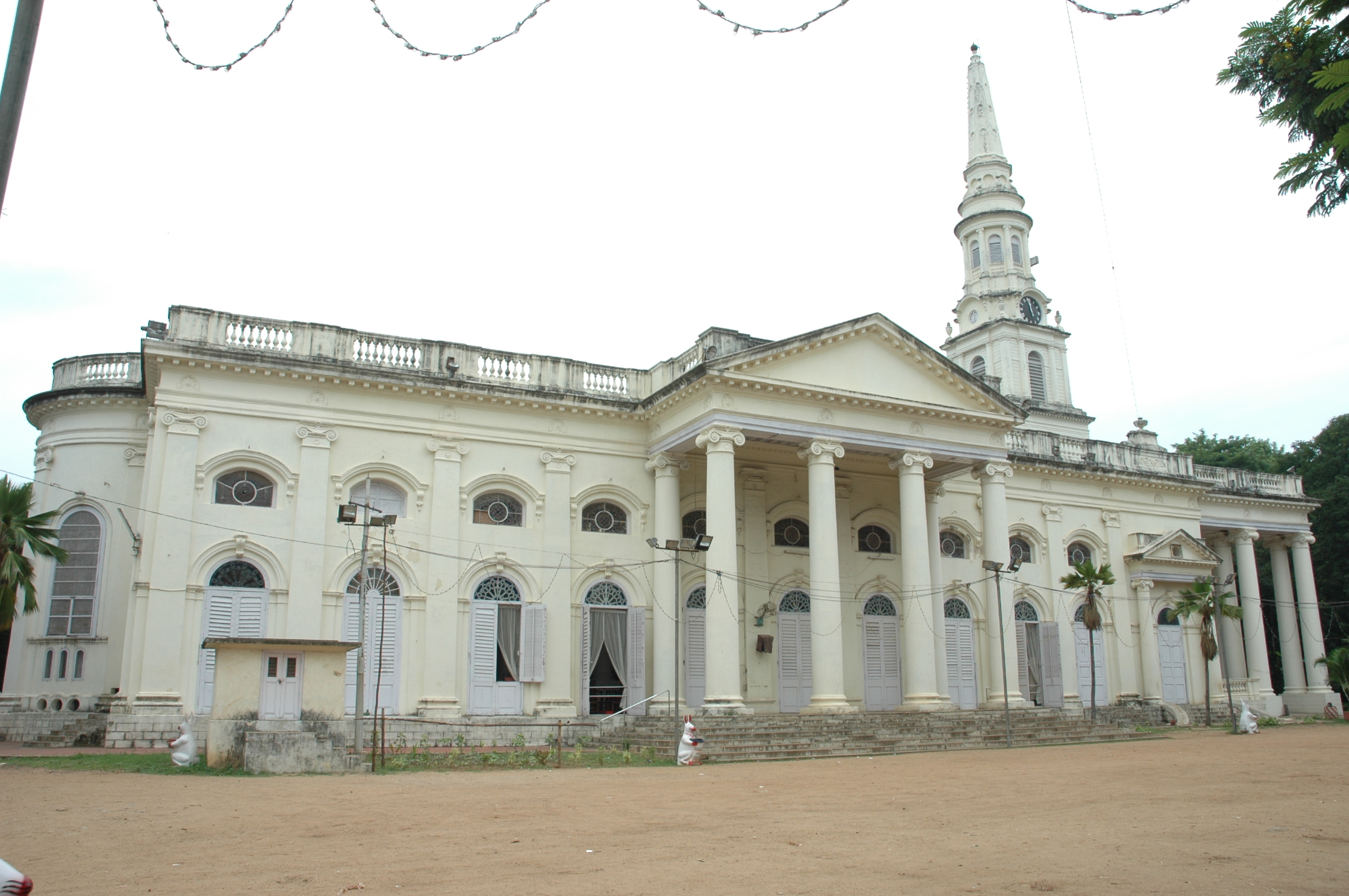
- St. George's Cathedral, Chennai

Location
- Country: India
- Territory: Tamil Nadu
- Ecclesiastical province: Church of South India

Statistics
- Congregations: 1,192

Information
- Cathedral: St. George's Cathedral
- Secular priests: 186

Current leadership
- Bishop: Rt. Rev. Paul Francis Ravichandran

Website
- csimadrasdiocese.org

The Diocese of Madras is one among the 22 dioceses of the Church of South India, a United Protestant denomination.

== History ==
The year 1640 marks the beginning of the Diocese of Madras in the Church of South India, being the year of the founding of the city of Madras, and it was only in 1647 that a Chaplain of the merchant fleet of the East India Company came ashore to celebrate Holy Communion in a temporary chapel in the Fort St. George. With the consecration of the oldest Anglican Church on the east of the Suez Canal in 1680 in the precincts of the Fort, dedicated to St Mary the Blessed virgin, under the jurisdiction of the Bishop of London, came established presence of the non-Roman Catholic Church in Madras.

The next 150 years saw the growth of the Christian population in Madras. It became obvious that St Mary's Church in the Fort cannot serve the growing and spread-out Christian population. So in 1815 the Church of St George was built on the arterial road linking St Thomas Mount and Fort St George. On 28 October 1835 Daniel Corrie, the Archdeacon of Calcutta, was consecrated Bishop and installed in the Church of St George; it marked both the coming into being of the Diocese of Madras and the elevation of the parish Church to St George's Cathedral. In 1842, her jurisdiction was described as "Presidency of Madras; Ceylon".

== About the Diocese ==
The Diocese of Madras consists of areas under Chennai (formerly Madras), Nellore, Chinglepet, North and South Arcot and the Tamil speaking areas of Chitoor district. It has around 80,000 members, with 120 presbyters. The diocese has 186 Pastorates and 1192 congregations.

=== Areas under Diocese of Madras ===
The Diocese of Madras is divided into four areas.

- Madras North : 51 Pastorates and 140 congregations
- Madras South : 49 Pastorates and 99 congregations
- Central : 47 Pastorates and 592 congregations
- Southern : 39 Pastorates and 361 congregations

== Bishops of the Diocese ==
- 1835–1837: Daniel Corrie
- 1837–1849: George Spencer
- 1849–1861: Thomas Dealtry
- 1861–1899: Frederick Gell
- 1899–1922: Henry Whitehead
- 1922–1941: Edward Waller
- 1941–1947: Michael Hollis
- 1947–1965: David Chellappa
- 1965–1974: Lesslie Newbigin
- 1974–1990: Sundar Clarke
- 1990–1999: Masilamani Azariah (consecrated 2 January 1990)
- 1999–2014: Vedanayagam Devasahayam
- 2016–2023: George Stephen Jayaraj
- 2025-: Paul Francis Ravichandran

== Notable churches of the Diocese ==
- St. George's Cathedral, Chennai

The cathedral was built in 1815. St. George's occupies an important place in the history of Christianity in India. The architecture of St. George's Cathedral is renowned for its tall spire, pillars, marble statues, mural tablets and memorials inside. The cathedral is a piece of architectural grandeur resting on a tier of steps.

- Egmore Wesley Church is one of the oldest churches in Madras Diocese. The original structure was built in Gothic architecture in 1903 by Wesleyan Mission.

== See also ==
- Church of South India
- Christianity in Tamil Nadu
- Trichy-Tanjore Diocese
- Tirunelveli Diocese
- Madurai-Ramnad Diocese
- Thoothukudi-Nazareth Diocese
- Diocese of Coimbatore
- Diocese of Kanyakumari
