= St. George's Cathedral, Chennai =

St. George's Cathedral
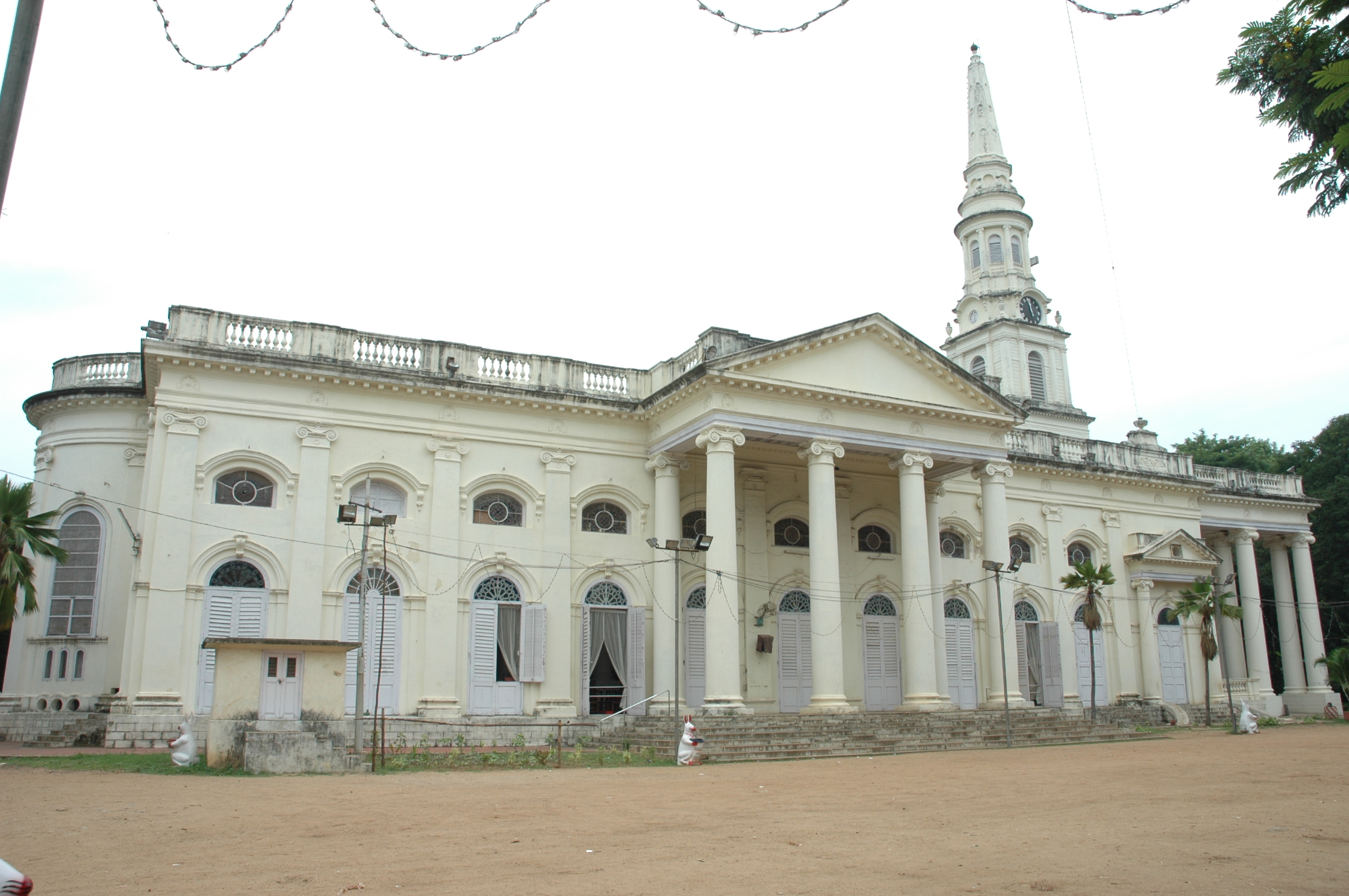
- Side view of St. George's Cathedral
- St. George's Cathedral
- 13.0518°N 80.2525°E
- Location: Chennai, Tamil Nadu
- Country: India
- Denomination: Church of South India
- Previous denomination: Church of England
- Website: www.csistgeorgescathedral.com

History
- Status: Cathedral
- Dedication: St. George
- Consecrated: 6 January 1816

Architecture
- Functional status: Active
- Architect: J. L. Caldwell
- Architectural type: Cathedral
- Style: Neoclassical
- Completed: 1815
- Construction cost: 57,225 Pagodas

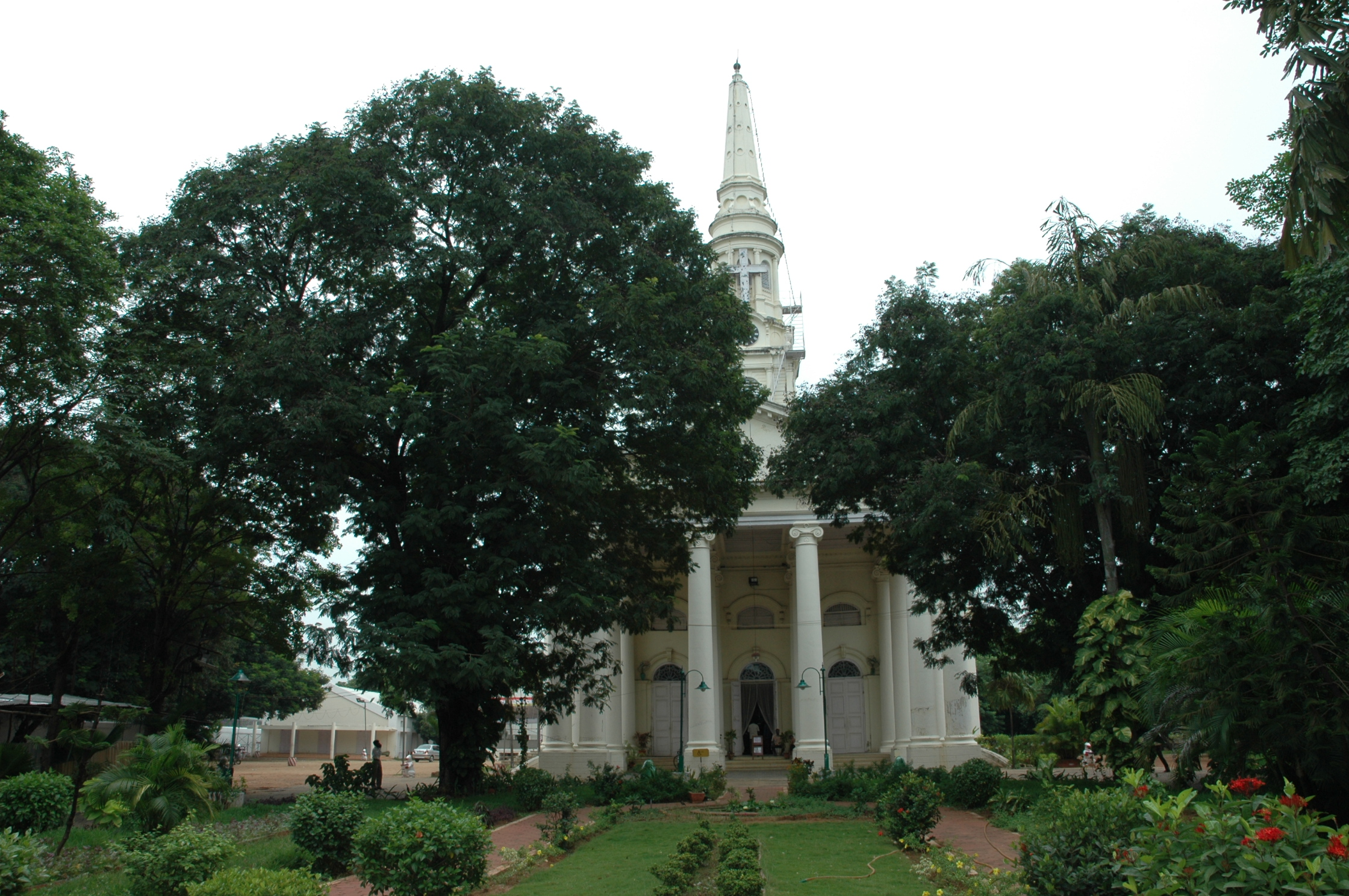
Façade

St. George's Cathedral is a Church of South India (previously Church of England and Anglican) cathedral in Chennai, India. The cathedral was built in 1815. St. George's occupies an important place in the history of Christianity in India, as the Church of South India was inaugurated here on 27 September 1947. It marked the breaking down of ecclesiastical barriers between Protestants of various traditions.

The architecture of St. George's Cathedral is remarkable for its tall spire, pillars, marble statues, mural tablets and memorials inside. The cathedral is a piece of architectural grandeur resting on a tier of steps. The governors of Fort St. George and their families worshipped here as also the viceroys when they visited Madras.

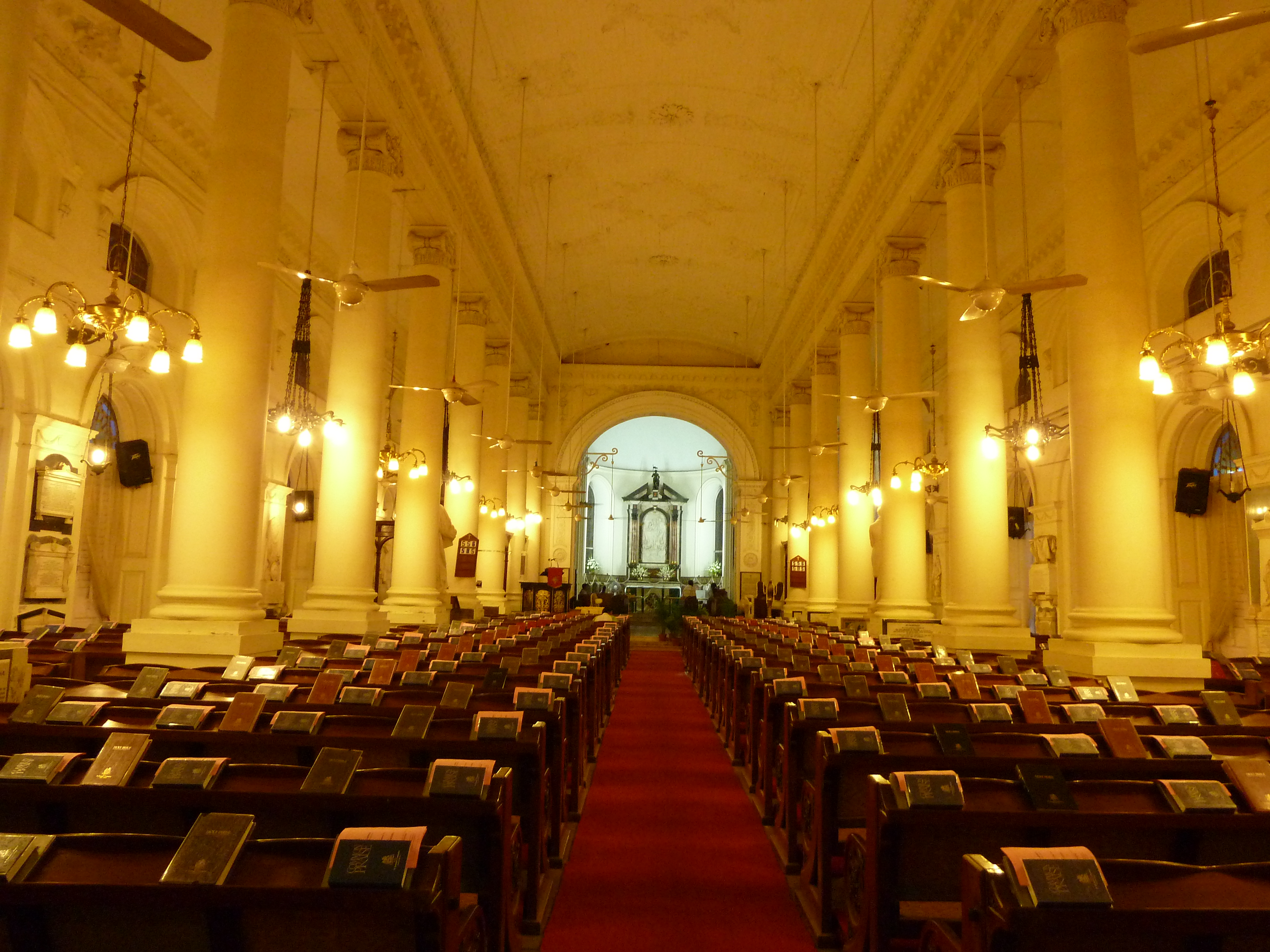
Cathedral in the evening lights

== History ==
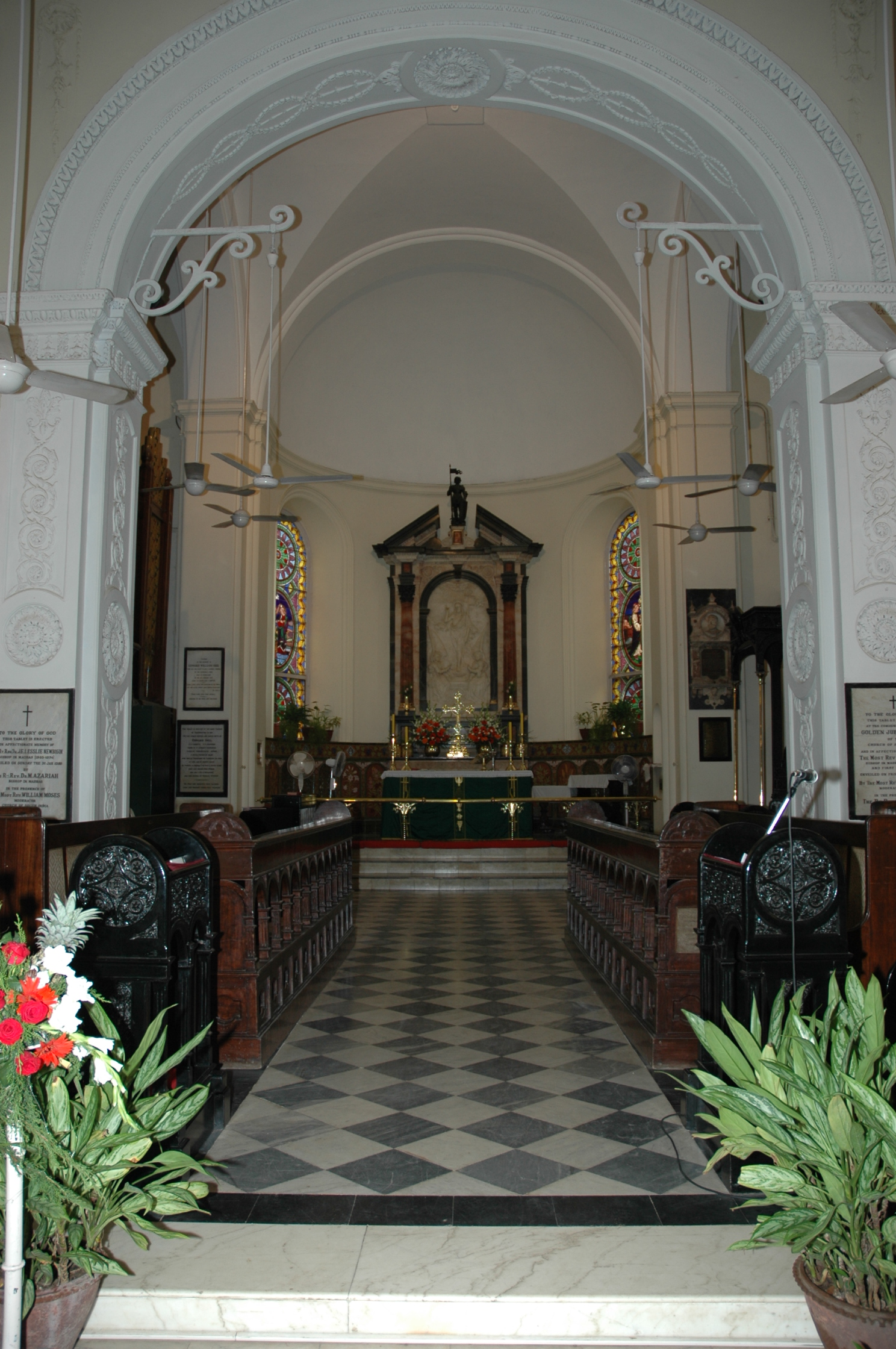
Main altar

The church was opened in 1815. It is stated that the church was completed by the people themselves with the aid of a lottery fund. It cost 41,709 pagodas and with the furniture, the organ and the architect's commission increasing the cost to 57,225 pagodas. 1 Pagoda was equivalent to 3.50 Indian rupees.

The British East India Company's Senior Engineer Col. James Lillyman Caldwell designed the church, and his assistant Captain De Havilland finished the construction. The site with an advantageous location was called the Choultry Plain. Though the Presidency Chaplain conducted the services from 1815, it was on 6 January 1816, that the first Anglican Bishop of Calcutta, Thomas Fanshaw Middleton consecrated the church to "the service of God according to the use of the Church of England".

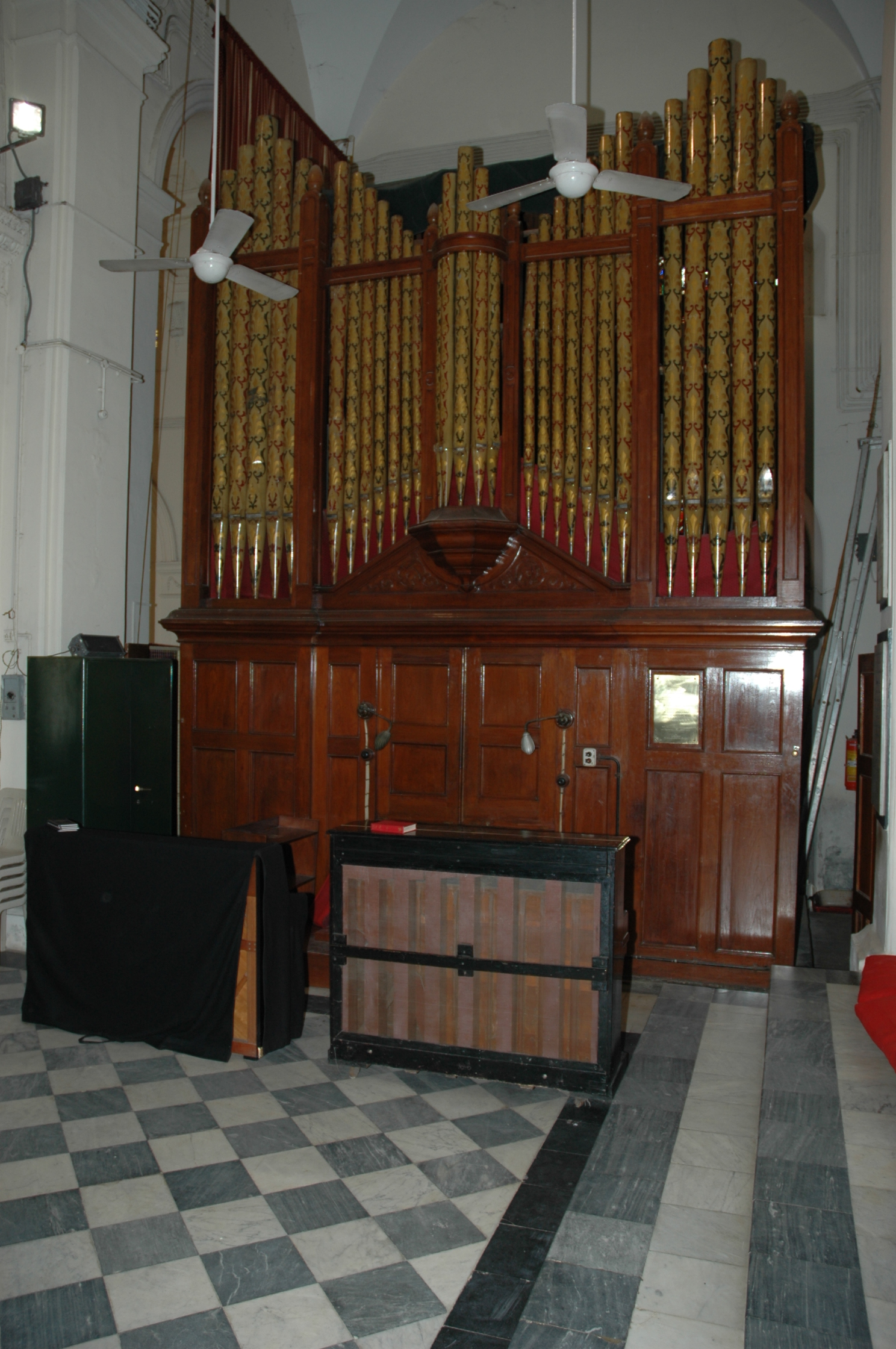
Pipe organ

== Congregation ==
Since 1815, the church has grown significantly in various ways. The south–eastern corner was set aside for the cemetery. De Havilland's wife's funeral was the first to be held here. The guard rail of the graveyard was made up war insignia and the Rev. Thomas Foulkes respectively. The brass altar cross was donated by Surgeon-General Cornish. The lectern was a memorial tribute by his friends to Archdeacon Warlow. The Episcopal chair was a gift from F. E. Kneale. The Litany stool and the clergy seats were carved by W. S. Whiteside of the Madras Civil Service. The gold chalice and paten for Holy Communion were donated by Lt. Col. Herbert St. Clare Carruthers in 1908. They weigh 3 lb 7 ounces (1.6 kg) in 18 carat (75%) gold. The chalice is set with diamonds in the form of a cross. The altar rail was erected by P. Orr and Sons to the memory of Edward William Orr, a member of the choir, who died in 1913. The marble baptismal font was gifted by the congregation.

== Cathedral ==
St. George's Church became prominent as the cathedral of Madras in 1835.

== Stained glass windows ==
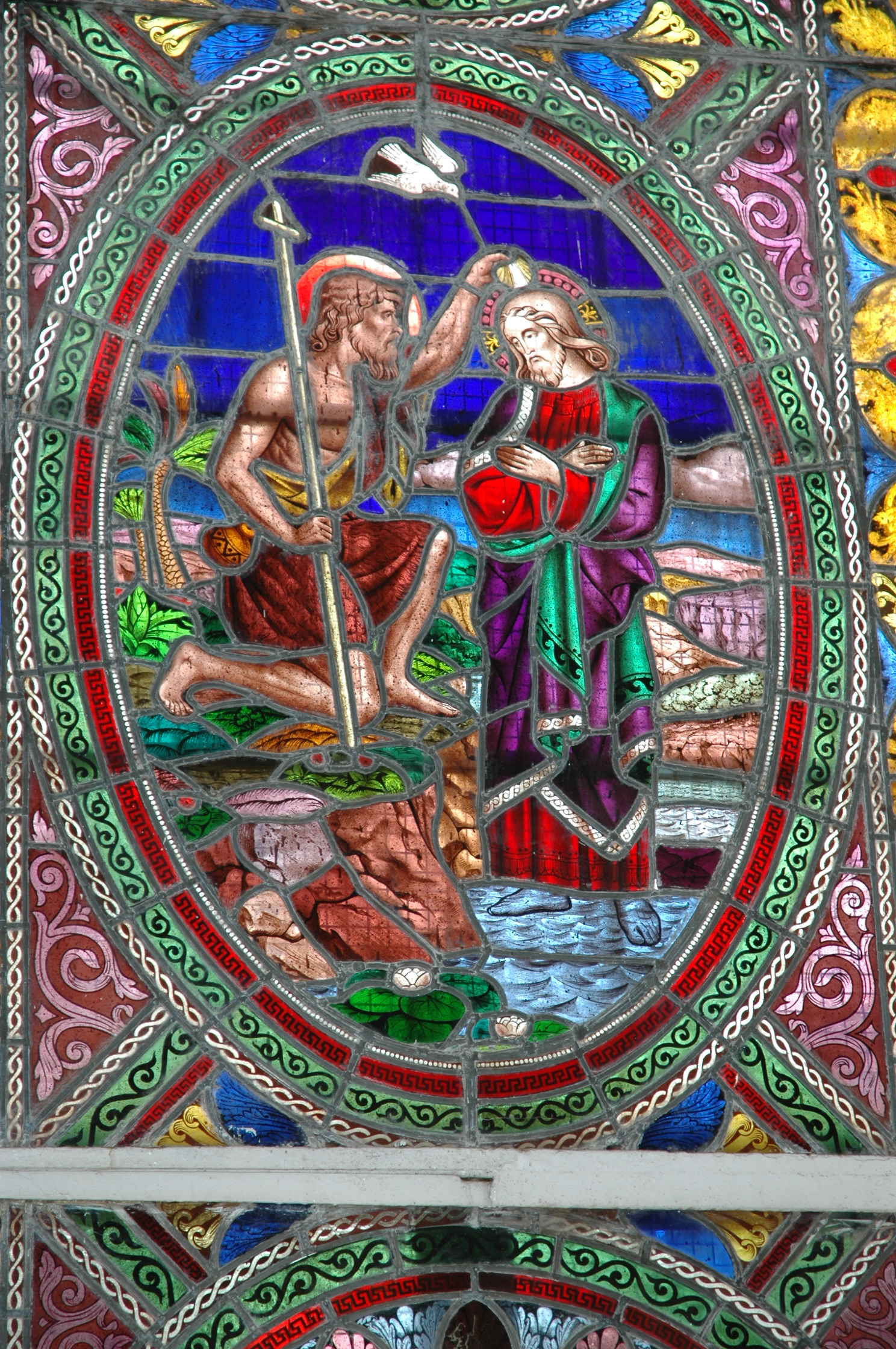
Baptism of Jesus

The stained glass windows of St. George's Cathedral are a marvel by itself. On either side of the altar in vibrant colours are two panels describing two important events in the life of Jesus. The left panel is a vivid depiction of the Baptism of Jesus by John the Baptist in the River Jordan. One can see the Holy Spirit descending in the form of a dove. The right panel depicts the resurrected Lord with Mary Magdalene. There are stained glass panels on top of all the doors of the cathedral. Sunlight filters through these shining examples of medieval art, leaving the entire Cathedral bathed in rich, warm hues.

== Memorials, tablets and statues ==
At the left entrance to the cathedral is the statue of Daniel Corrie, the first Bishop of Madras (1835–1837). Associated with many schools, he is shown with an open Bible blessing an Indian boy in loin cloth, a sacred thread and a tuft. At the main entrance is Thomas Dealtry, Bishop of Madras (1849–1861) in bas-relief. One who ordained 151 clergymen is seen blessing two young priests attended by his son Archdeacon Dealtry, Lugard and Murphy. At the entrance of the Lady chapel is the bust of Frederick Gell, Bishop of Madras (1861–1899). Nearby is the alto-relieve statue of Reginald Heber by Francis Chantrey.

There is a memorial tablet for the first Indian Bishop of Madras, David Chellappa (1955–1964) erected by the congregation of St. George's Cathedral. The consecration and installation of Bishop David Chellappa as the first Indian Bishop in Madras in 1955 was an important occasion in the cathedral. Two other memorials for Indians are that of Dewan Bahadur N. Subrahmanyam (1841–1911)—Administrator General of Madras who founded and endowed the Kalyani Hospital and Dr. R. D. Paul who died in 1975 "after a long and devoted service to the Church, the State and the Community".

Many memorials were erected to the memory of British soldiers, religious leaders, educationists, police officers, engineers, businessmen, judges, medical officers and their families. There is a tablet for Robert Caldwell, who for 53 years devoted himself to the furtherance of the Gospel among the Tamil people of Tirunelveli. Well known as a scholar and philologist, he served also as assistant to the Bishop of Madras and died at Kodaikanal in 1891. From another tablet, we see that Frederick Rowlandson was Registrar of the Diocese of Madras for 53 years and died in 1929. Similarly we see from a plaque that Edward Sell, Canon of St. George's Cathedral had worked for 67 years in Madras and died in 1932 at the age of 93. John Mousley, the first Archdeacon in Madras (1815–1819) has a commemoration tablet by Flaxman.

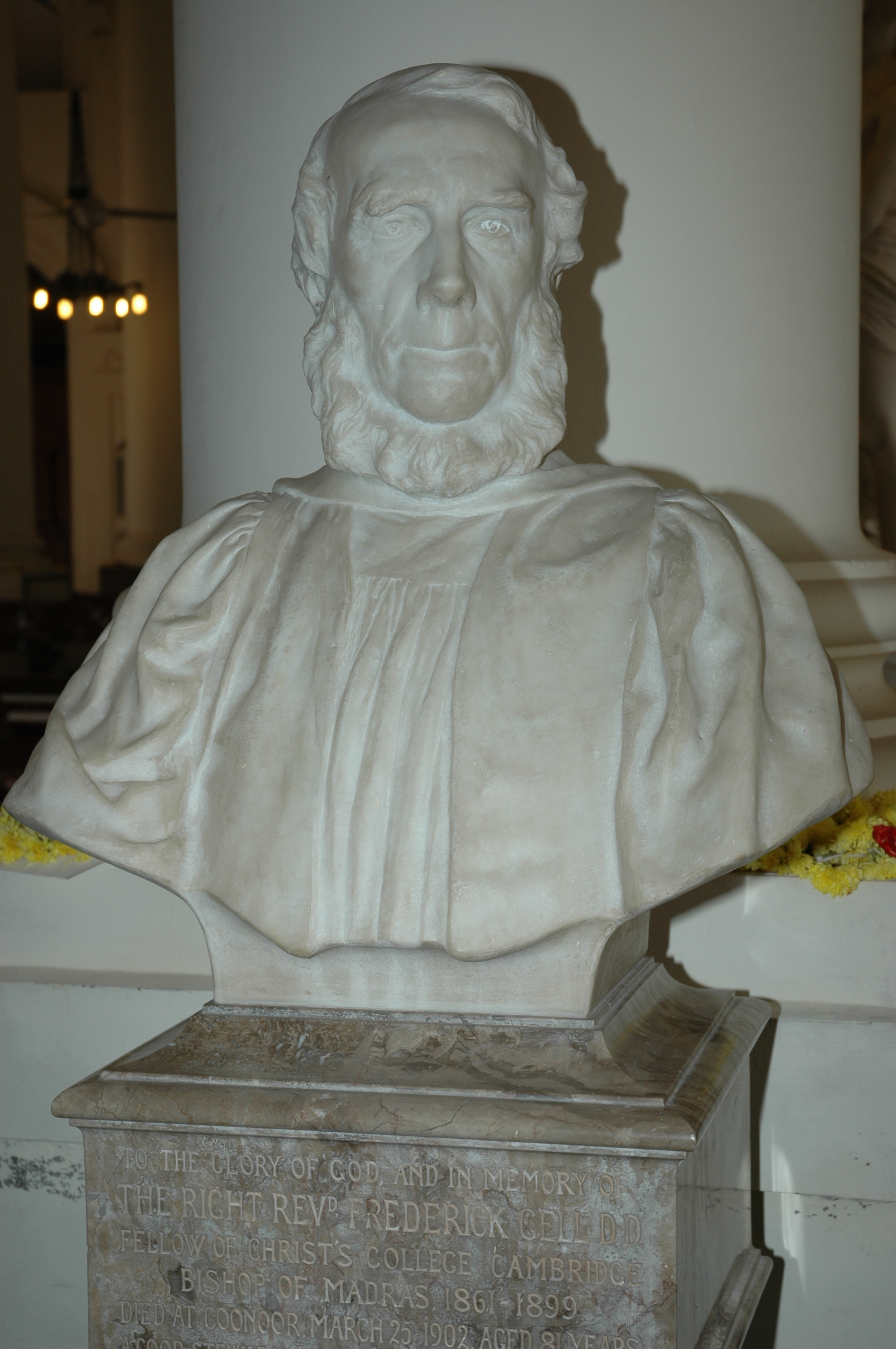
Rt. Rev. Frederick Gell

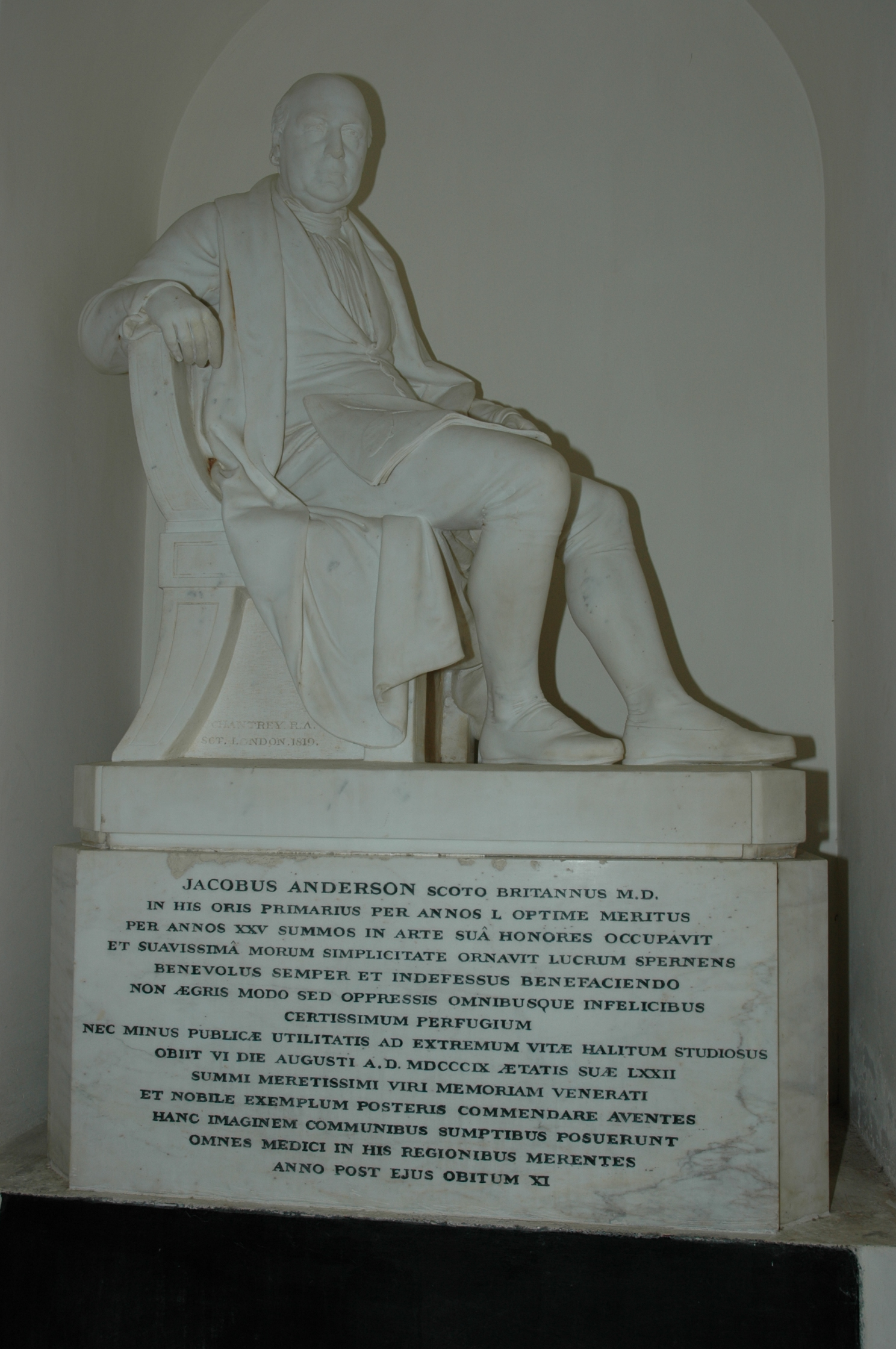
Jacobus Anderson

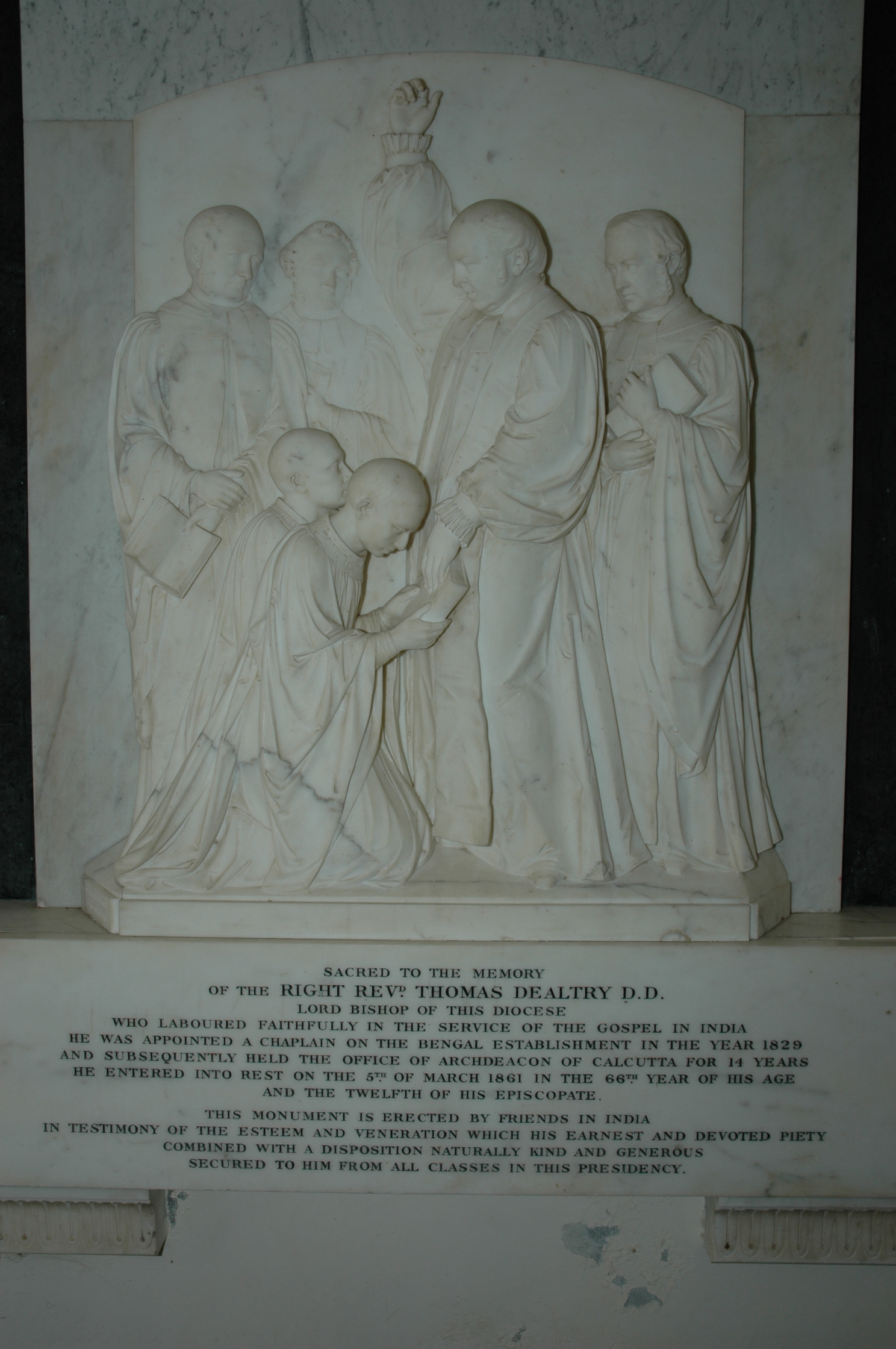
Rt. Rev. Thomas Dealtry

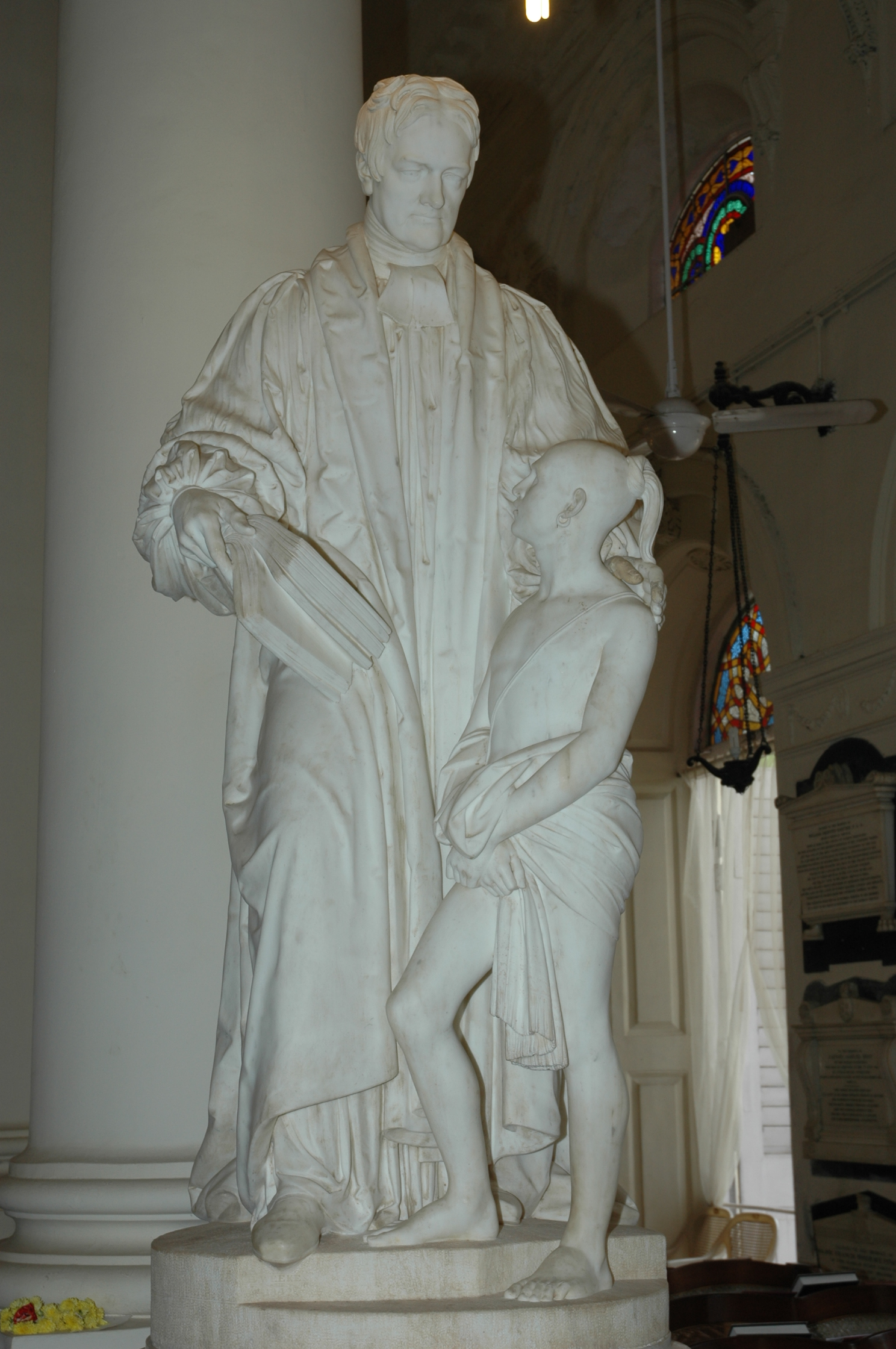
Rt. Rev. Daniel Corrie

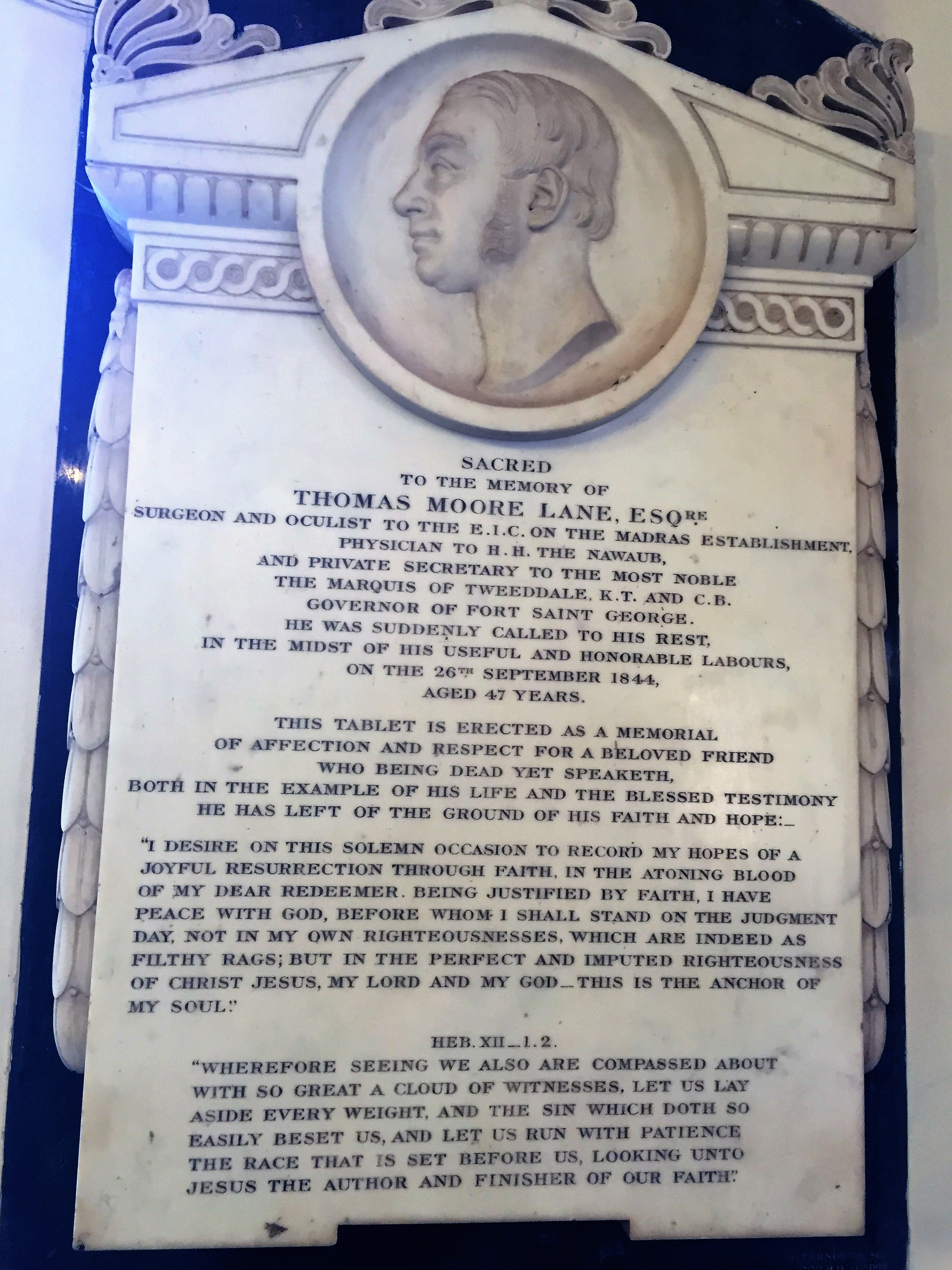
Thomas Moore-Lane Memorial

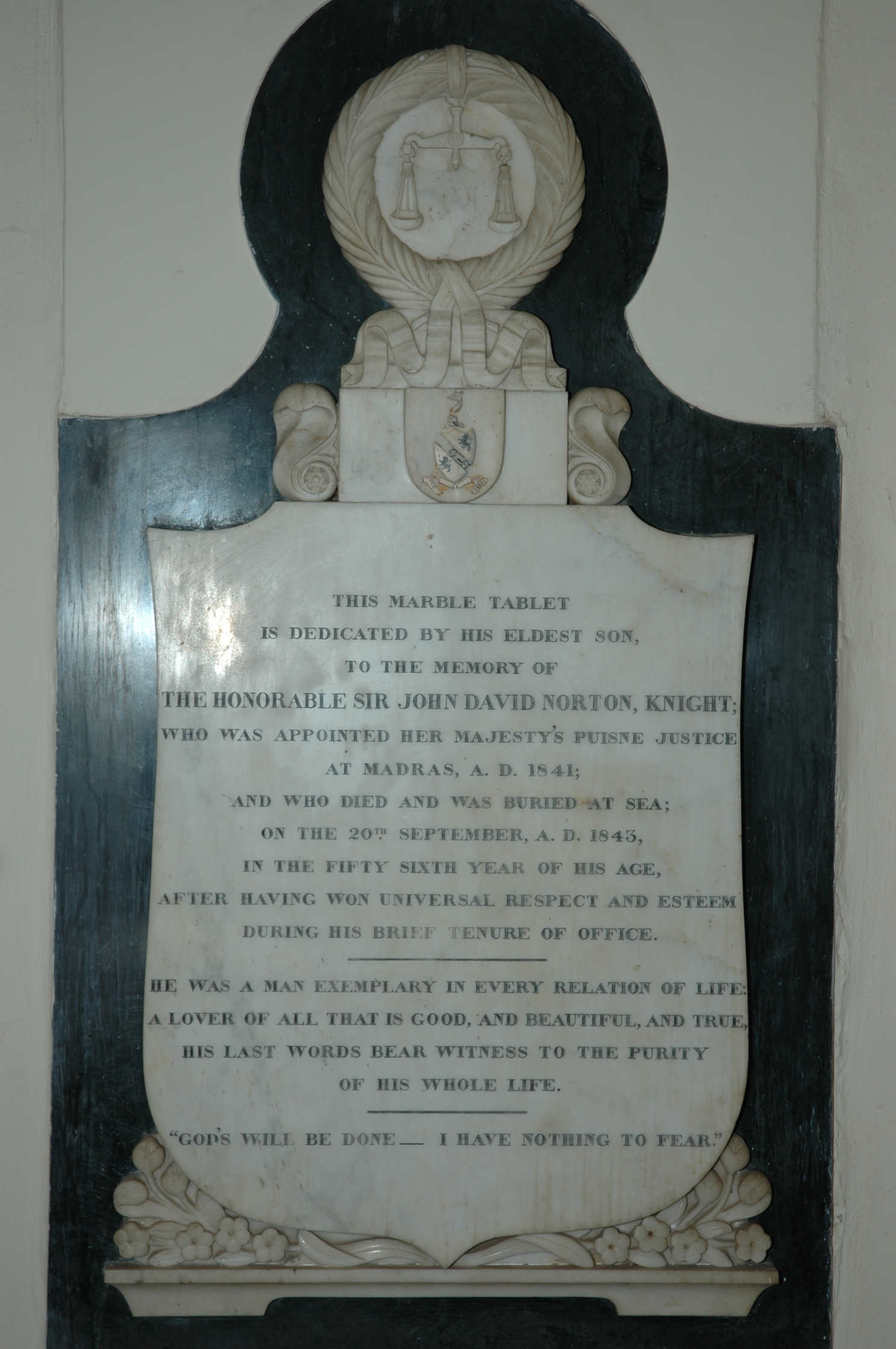
Sir John David Norton

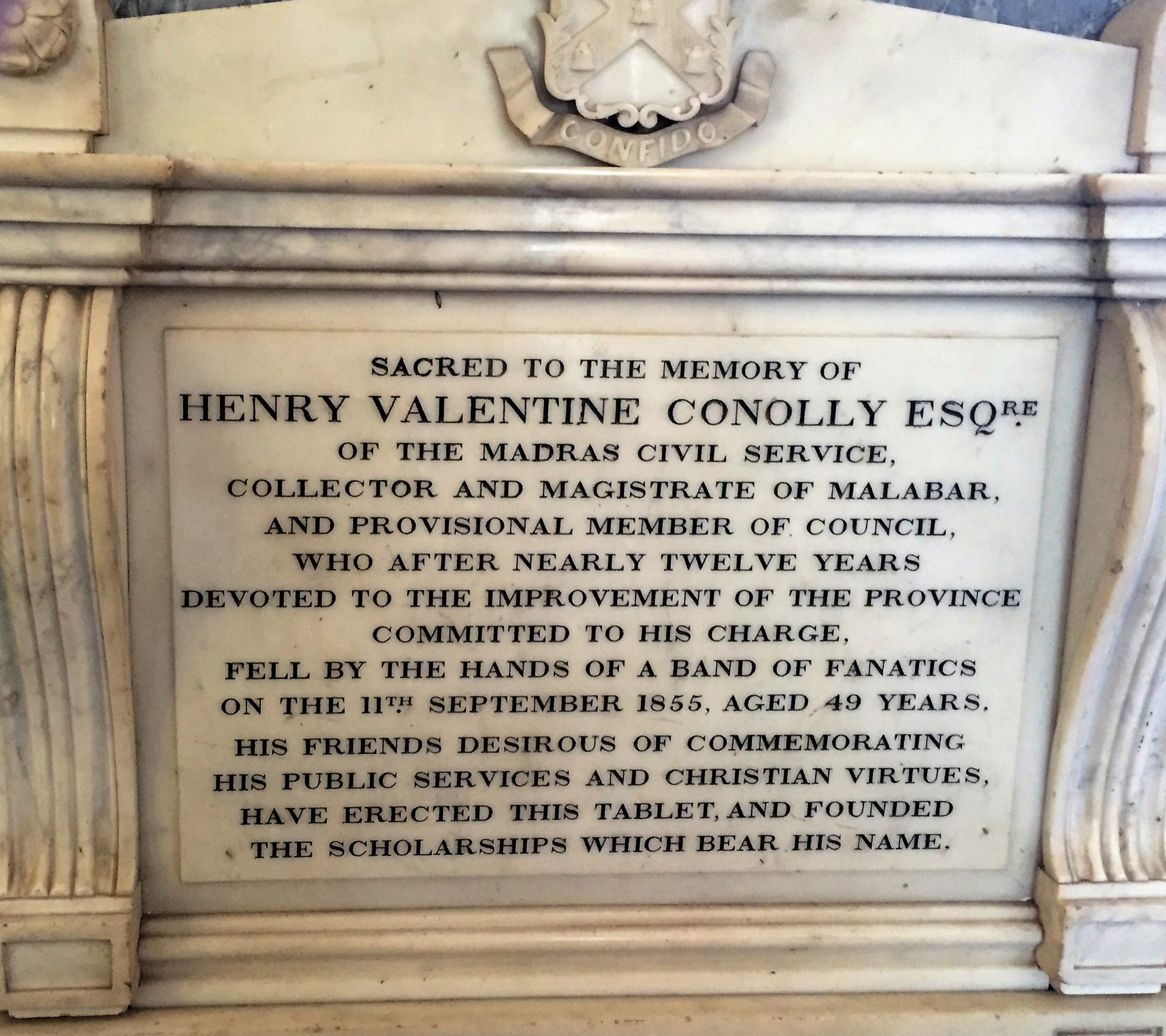
Henry Valentine Conolly Memorial

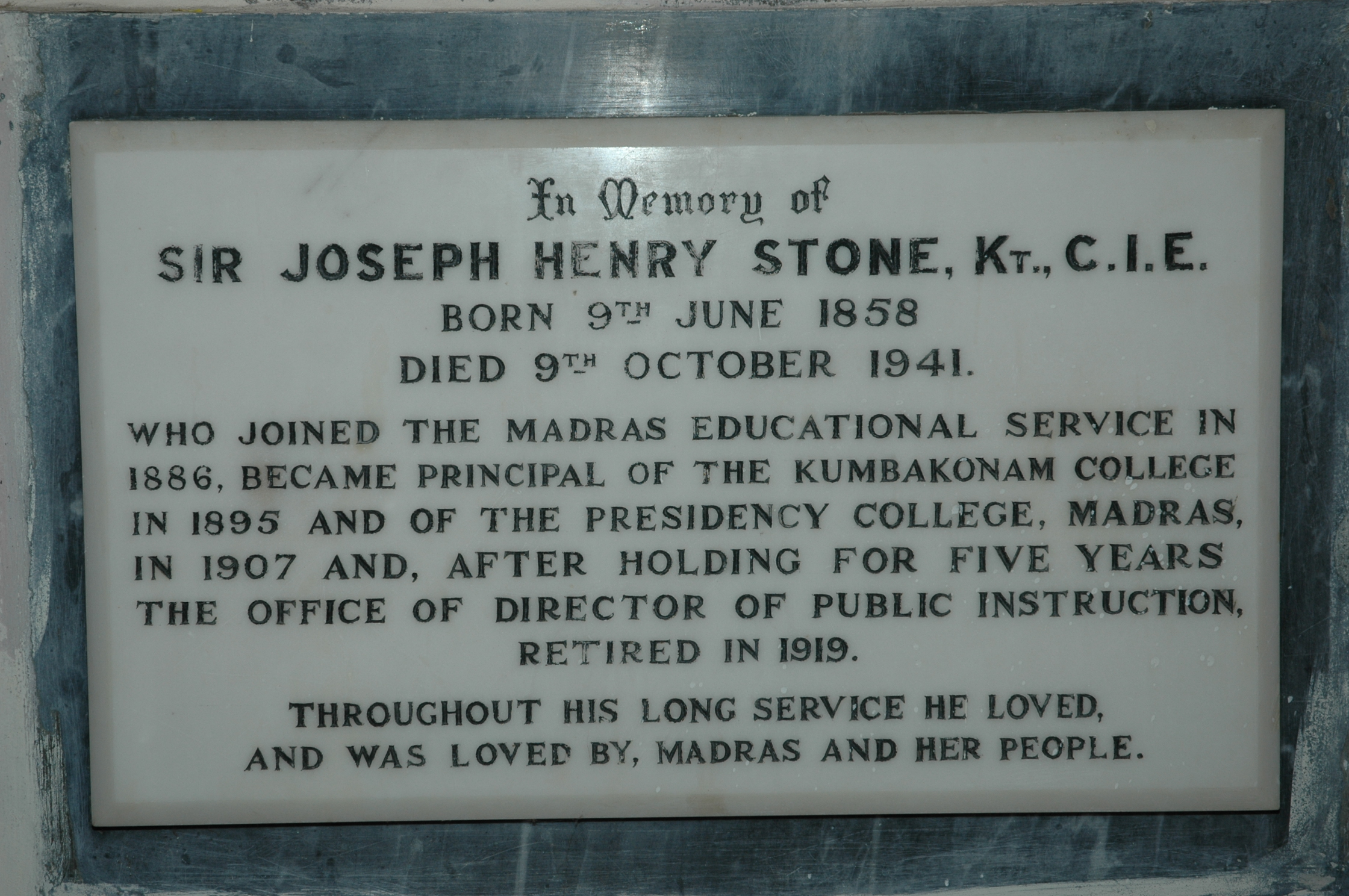
Sir Joseph Henry Stone

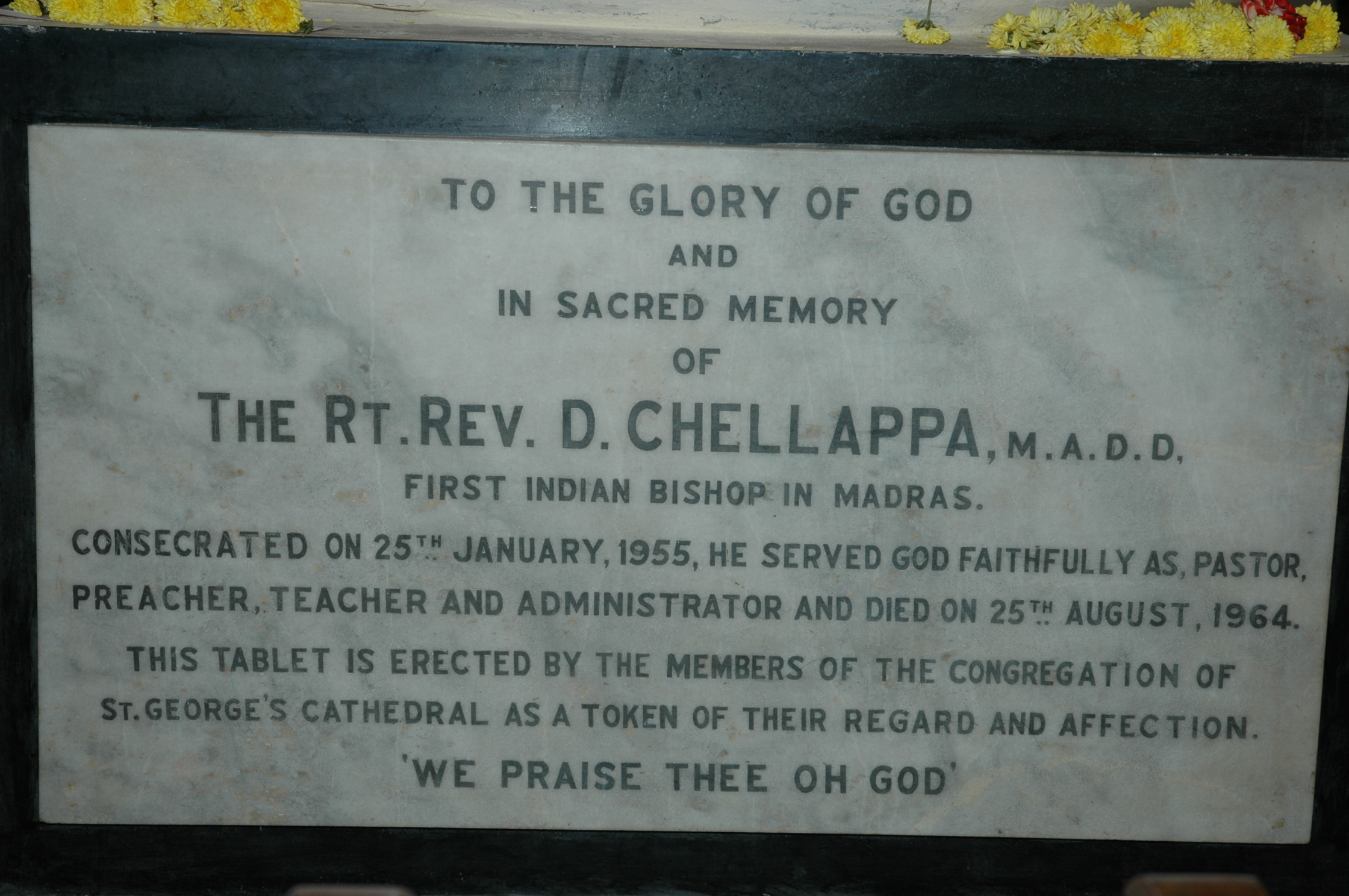
Rt. Rev. D. Chellappa

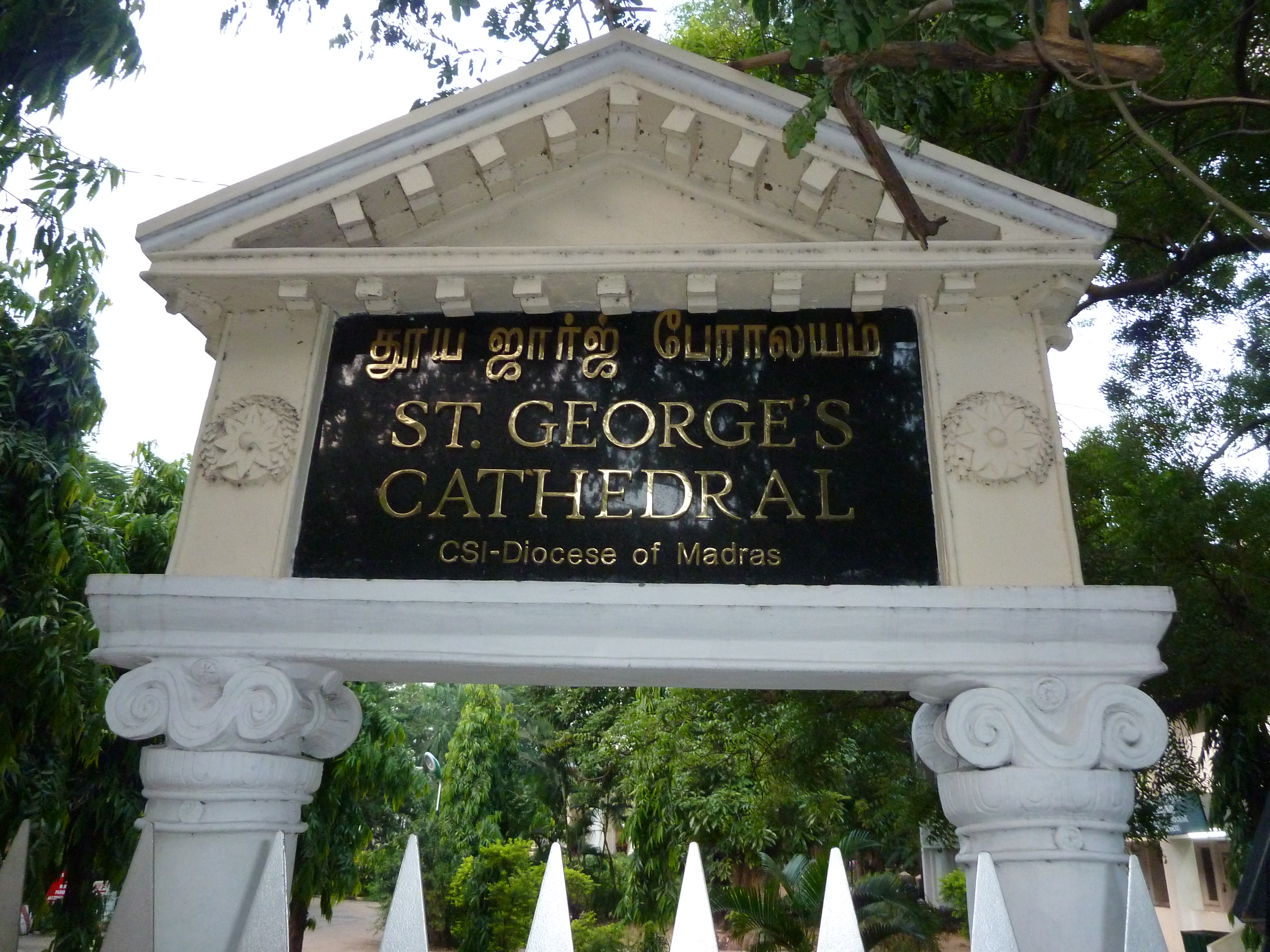
Name board of St.George's cathedral, Chennai

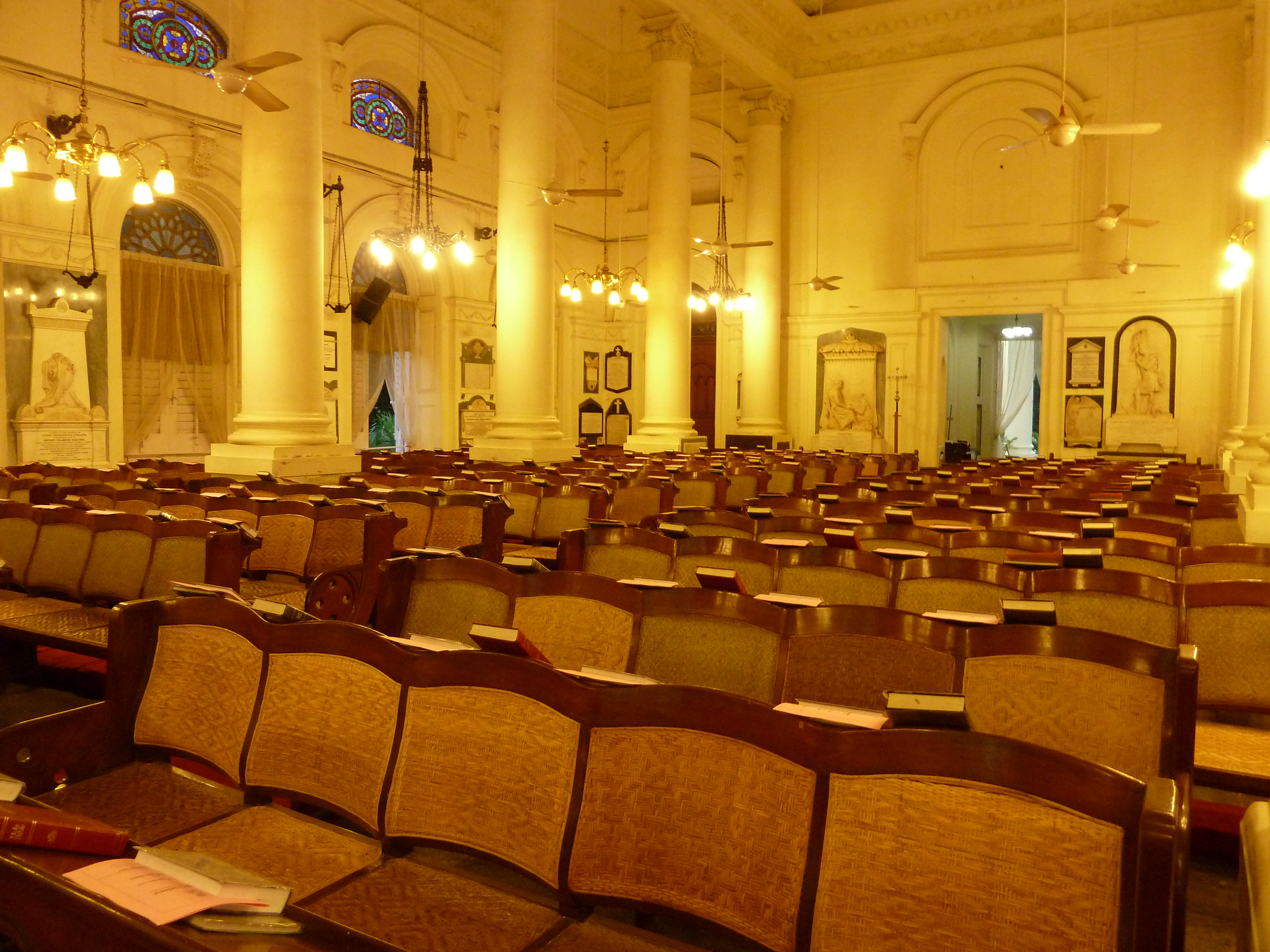
seating arrangement

== Notable members ==
Notable people have worshipped in the cathedral as is revealed by the memorial tablets. There is a statue in memory of James Stephen Lushington, Bengal Civil Service, and son of S. R. Lushington – Governor of Madras, who died young in 1832. In the Lady chapel there is a plaque in memory of Amelia, 21, who died in 1833, the only child of Sir Frederick Adam, Governor of Madras. Other memorials exist for William Montague Douglas Home, second son of the Earl of Home, who died in 1822, Sir Joseph Henry Stone (1858–1941) Director of Public Instruction, Hitchcock of the Indian Police (1884–1926), Sir John Norton – Puisne Justice who was buried at sea on 20 September 1843, Thomas Moore Lane – Physician to the Nawab and Private Secretary to the Governor who died in 1844 and Thomas Parry who died at Porto Novo in 1824 after "a residence of 37 years at Madras with unblemished reputation". There is an interesting memorial of a woman feeding a snake in tribute to Dr. John Mack, Surgeon to the Governor's Bodyguard and Physician to the Nawab of Carnatic who died in 1852.

== Military personnel ==
Many military personnel were prominent in their affiliation to St. George's Cathedral. Tablets have been raised in memory of Major George Broadfoot of the 34th Madras Infantry who fought in the First Anglo-Afghan War and fell at the Battle of Ferozeshah in 1845, Major General Sir Robert Henry Dick – a hero of the Peninsular War who died at the Battle of Sobraon, Major John Frederick Graham who fell at the Battle of the Somme in 1916, Col. John Impett who served at Waterloo at the age of 15 and died as Sheriff of Madras in 1866, Lt. Col. James Drever who died "from the effects of a coup de soleil in China" in 1842 and Lt. James Forsyth who died of cholera while on expedition to China in the same year.

The memorial to Sir Robert Henry Dick at the cathedral depicts a 42nd Highlander in full uniform resting against a pedestal, on which is inscribed the battle roll of the regiment

== Cathedral bells ==
The cathedral has eight bells that were manufactured by Messrs Mears & Steinbank, Founders, London in 1871. They were presented to St. George's Cathedral by G. Banbury during Christmas 1873. The chiming device was donated by Thomas Foulkes. All eight bells vary in size. The height of the largest bell is 42", its diameter is 48" and its circumference 150" approximately. The smallest bell is 24" in height, 30" in diameter and approximately 94" in circumference. These bells were installed inside the central portion of the pinnacle below the clock and about 50' above the ground level. They are fixed on wooden beams about one foot in thickness on all sides – four bells at the bottom and four on the top.

== Cathedral organisation ==
St. George's Cathedral has a well-knit structural organisation for management. The trustees include senior members of the cathedral appointed by the Bishop of Madras. The trustees look after the assets of the cathedral. The Pastorate Committee consists of 10 elected members including the secretary, treasurer and assistant secretary. Women and youth are represented. Other important church members are the lay leaders, choir with leader and organist, music director of the men's chorus, superintendent of Sunday school, superintendent of the Home for Senior Citizens, the cathedral manager and sexton.

The cathedral management works under the leadership of the presbyter and associate presbyter. It is an elective, democratic system and everyone has her part to play.

== Progress since 1947 ==
Since 1947, the cathedral has acquired a new setting and atmosphere. The trustees and the congregation have demonstrated their loyalty in various ways. Several building projects, including a new parsonage, the vergers quarters and the parish hall, have been achieved. Today St. George's Cathedral, with a church membership of over 1200 families, continues its role as the mother church and as the church of the city. The Community Welfare Centre, Leprosy Project, Sunday School, Youth, Women's, Men's and Teen Fellowships, Green Pastures, Prayer Groups, Gospel Teams, Quiz Programs, Bible Study Groups and the Home for the Aged have progressed well. The Community Welfare Centre has a Sewing School, a Typewriting Institute, a Day Care Centre, a Medical Clinic, and other extension projects. The pipe organ has been repaired and the cemetery cleaned up.

== Cathedral layout ==
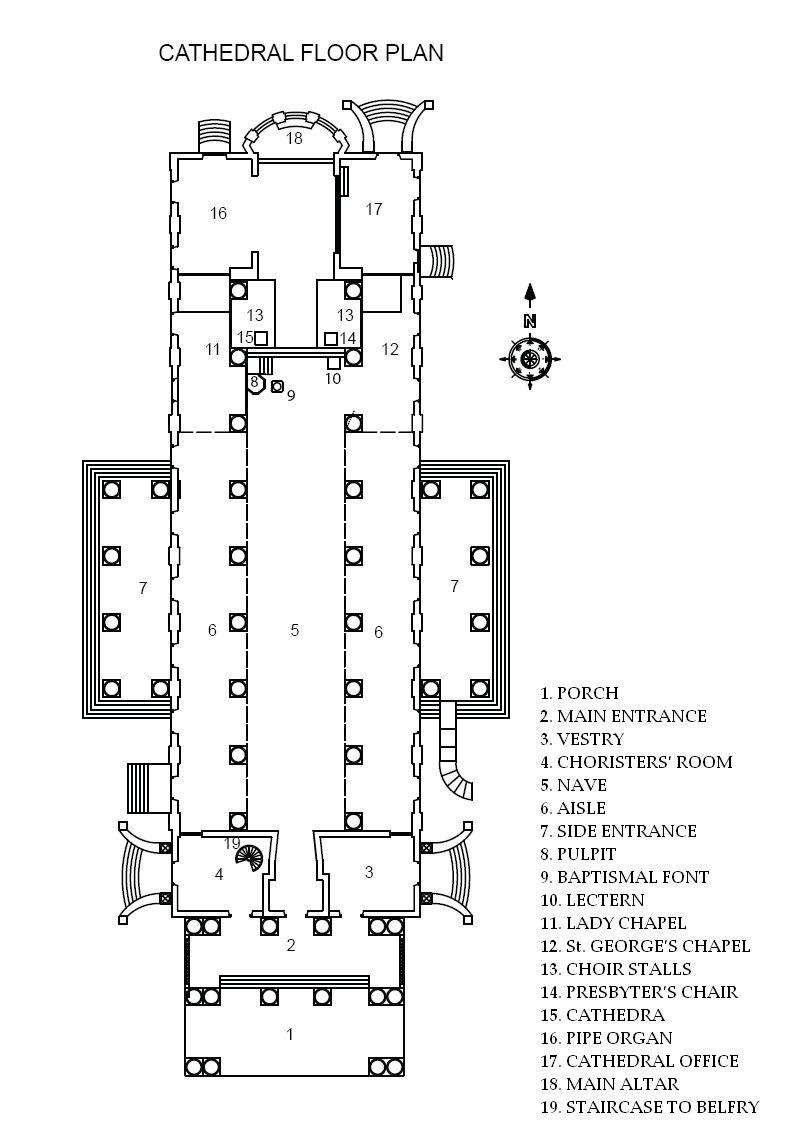
Floor Plan

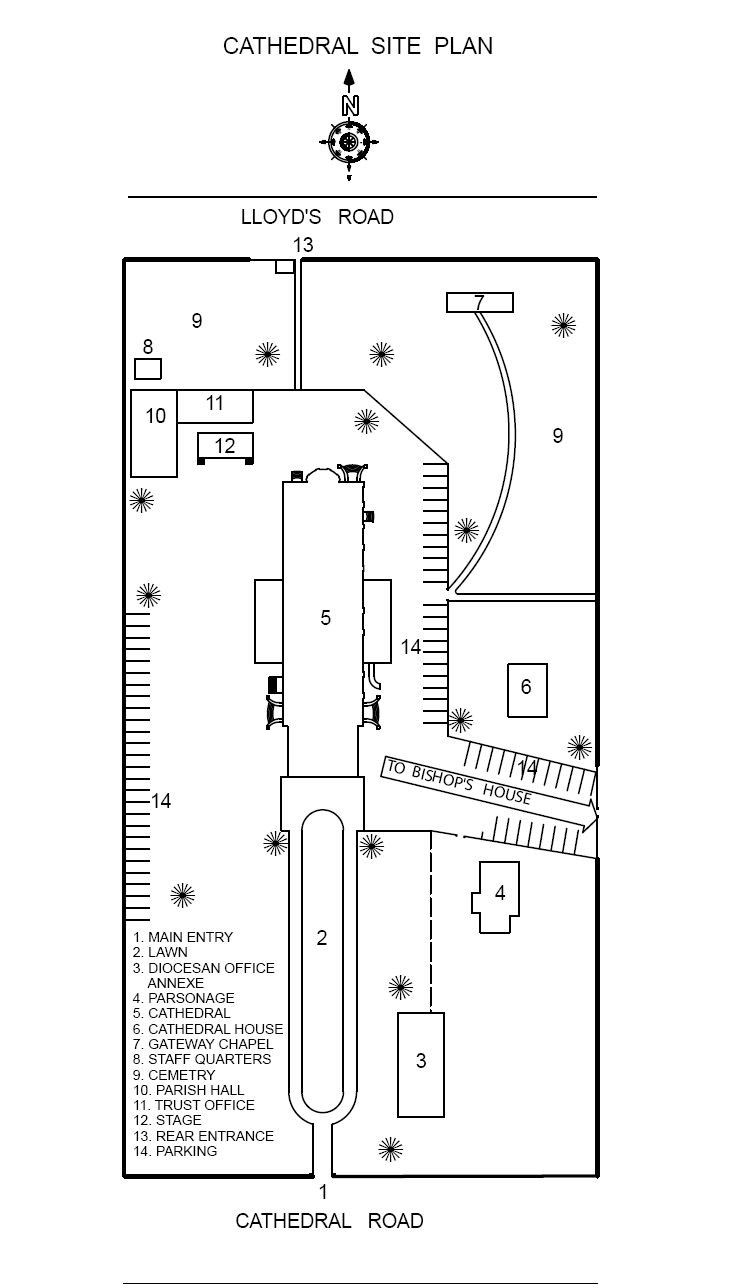
Site Plan

== Bishops of the Diocese of Madras ==
- Daniel Corrie 1835–1837
- George John Trevor Spencer 1837–1849
- Thomas Dealtry 1849–1861
- Frederick Gell 1861–1899
- Henry Whitehead 1899–1922
- Edward Harry Mansfield Waller 1923–1941
- Arthur Michael Hollis 1942–1954
- David Chellappa 1955–1964
- Lesslie Newbigin 1965–1974
- Sundar Clarke 1974–1989
- Masillamani Azariah 1990–1999
- V. Devasahayam 1999–2015
- J. George Stephen. 2016 – 2023
- Paul Francis Ravichandran 2025-Present

== Presbyters of St. George's Cathedral ==
- Clarence Edwin Brett 1947
- John Murdoch Wallace 1947–1948
- Robert Leslie Watson 1948–1958
- E.J.M. Wyld & R.L. Manson 1957–1958
- Ian Matheson Calvert 1959–1962
- David Max Samuel 1962–1964
- Sundar Clarke 1964–1969
- Eugene Paul Heideman 1969–1970
- Ebenezer Immanuel 1970–1975
- Swamiappan David 1975–1980
- Christopher Solomon 1980–1984
- R. Trinity Baskeran 1984–1985
- D. Amos Manoharan 1985–1990
- David Devairakkam 1990–1995
- Oliver T. Arockiam 1995–1999
- N.G. Mathew 1999–2003
- Noel Jason 2003–2006
- D.C. Premraj 2006–2011
- Immanuel Devakadatcham 2011–2018
- YL Babu Rao 2018–2019
- Lawrence Jebadoss 2019– 2021

== Images ==
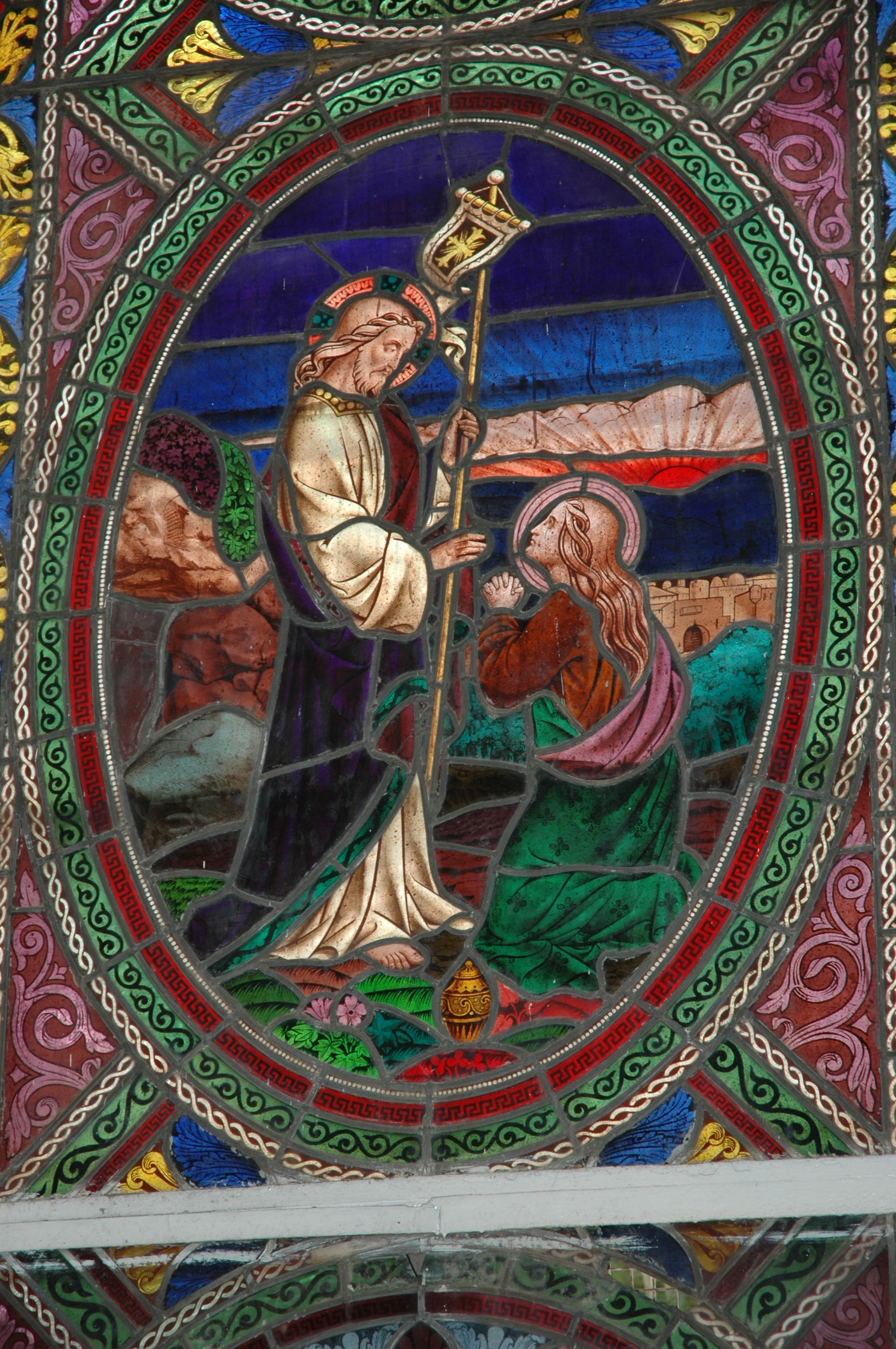
Resurrected Lord

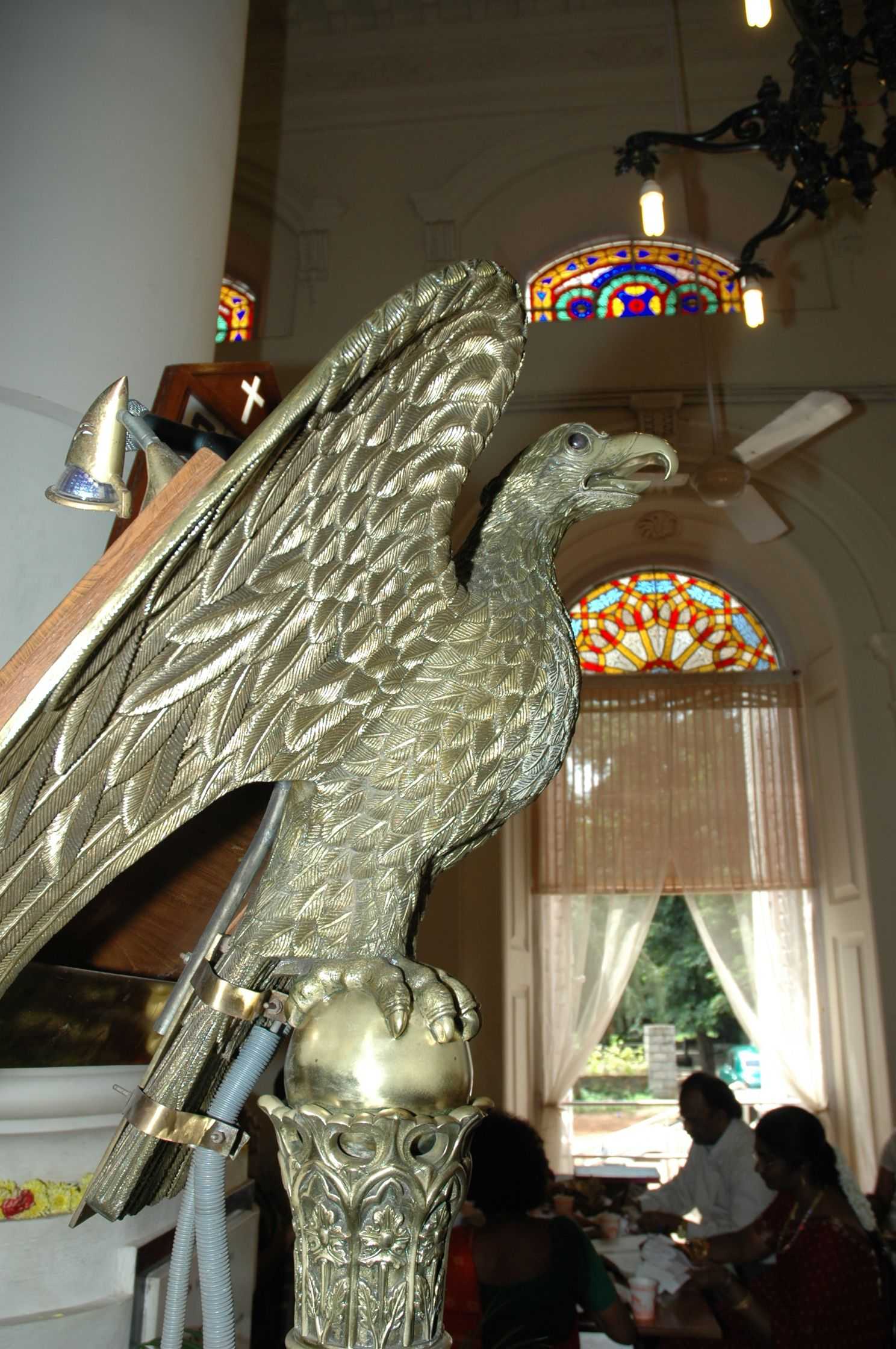
Lectern

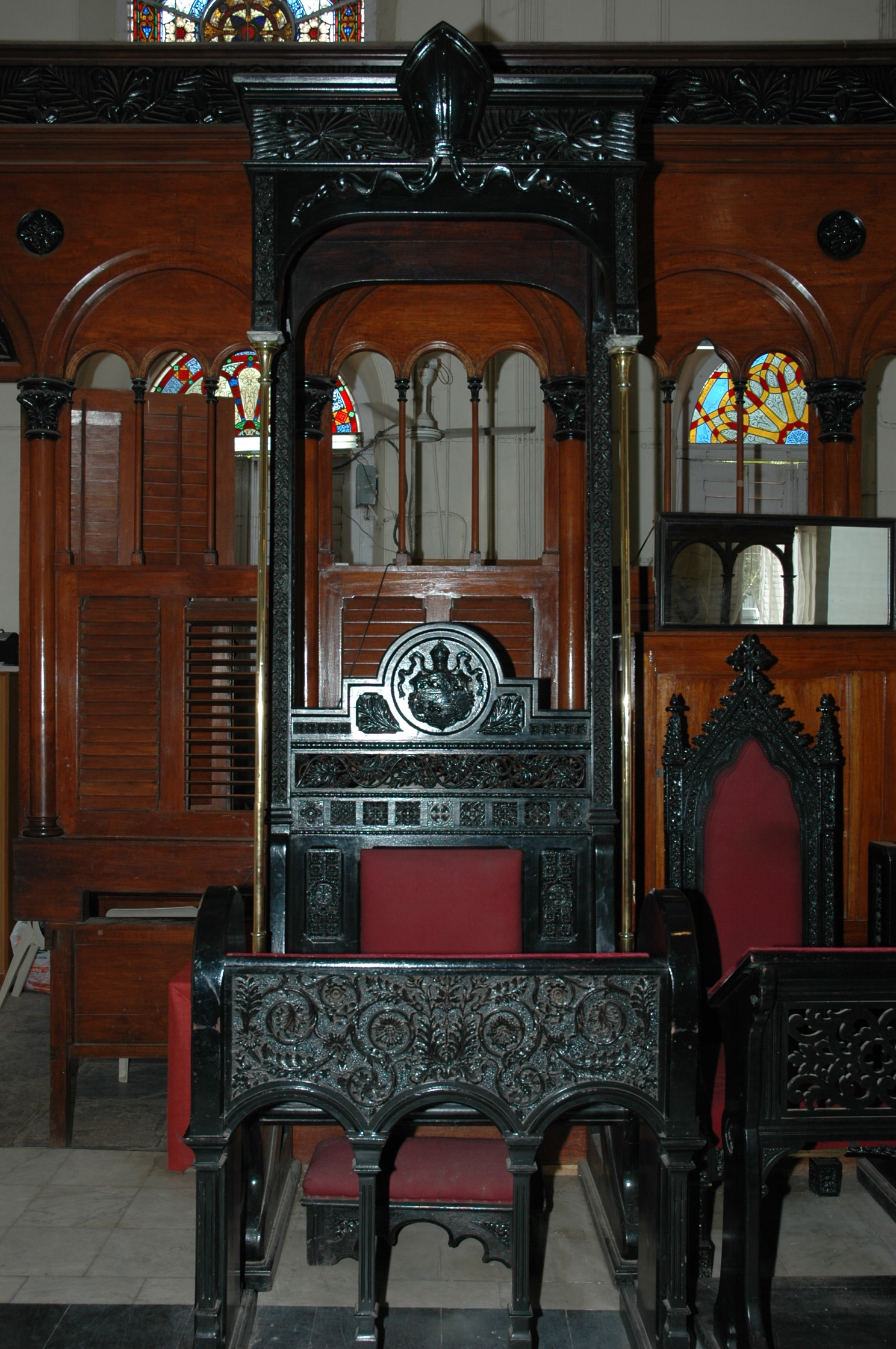
Episcopal and bishop's chair

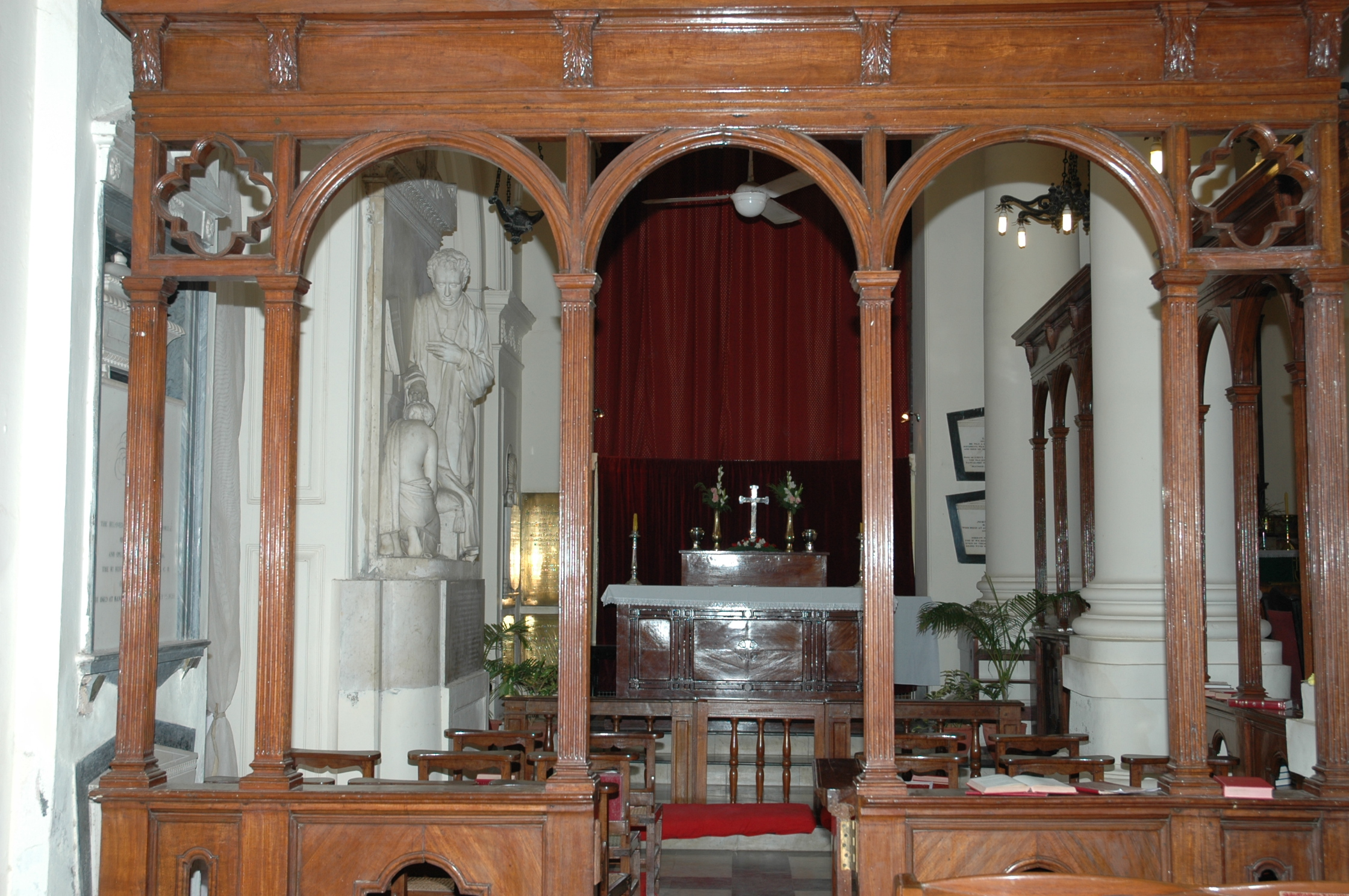
Lady chapel

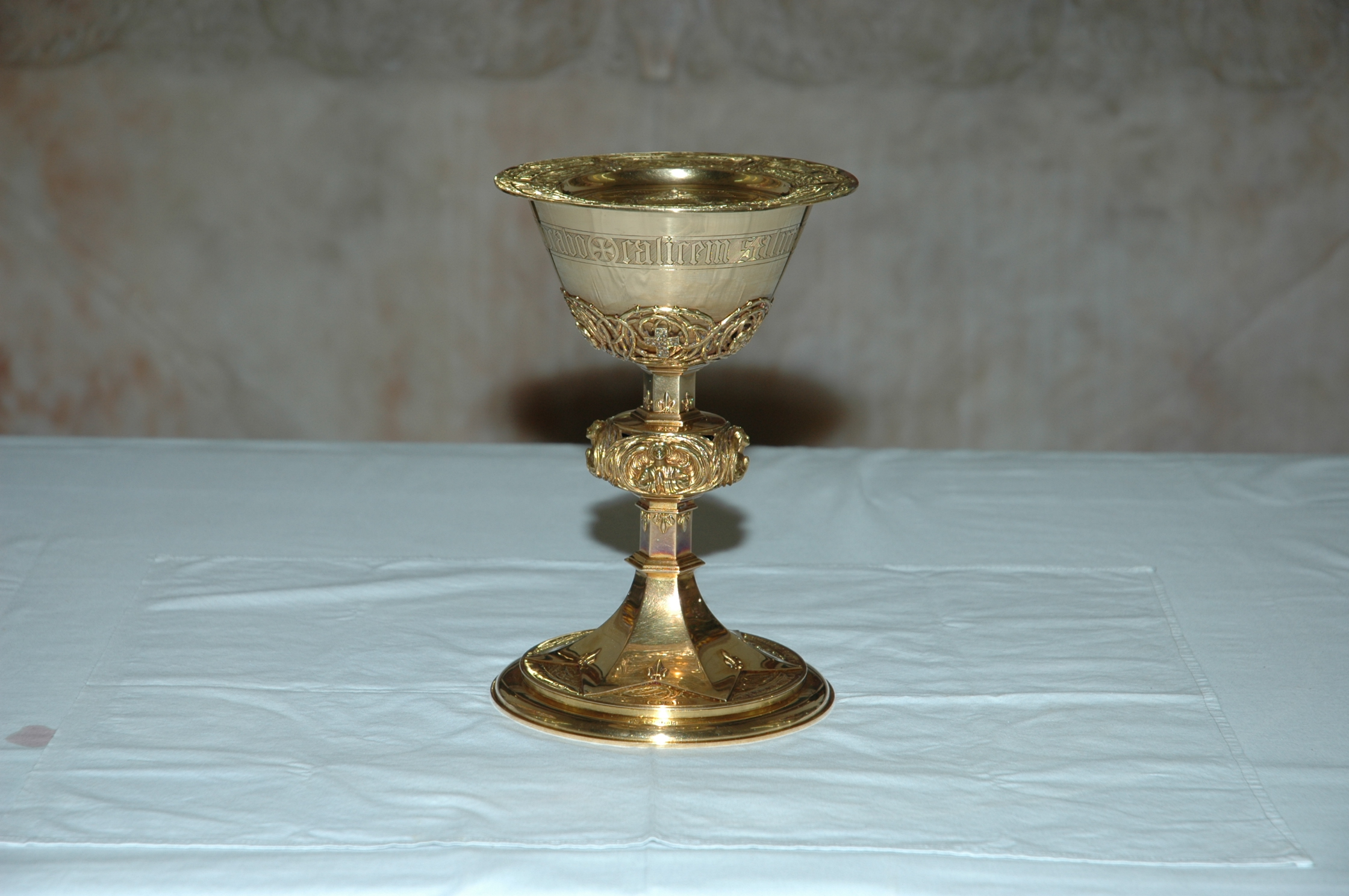
Chalice

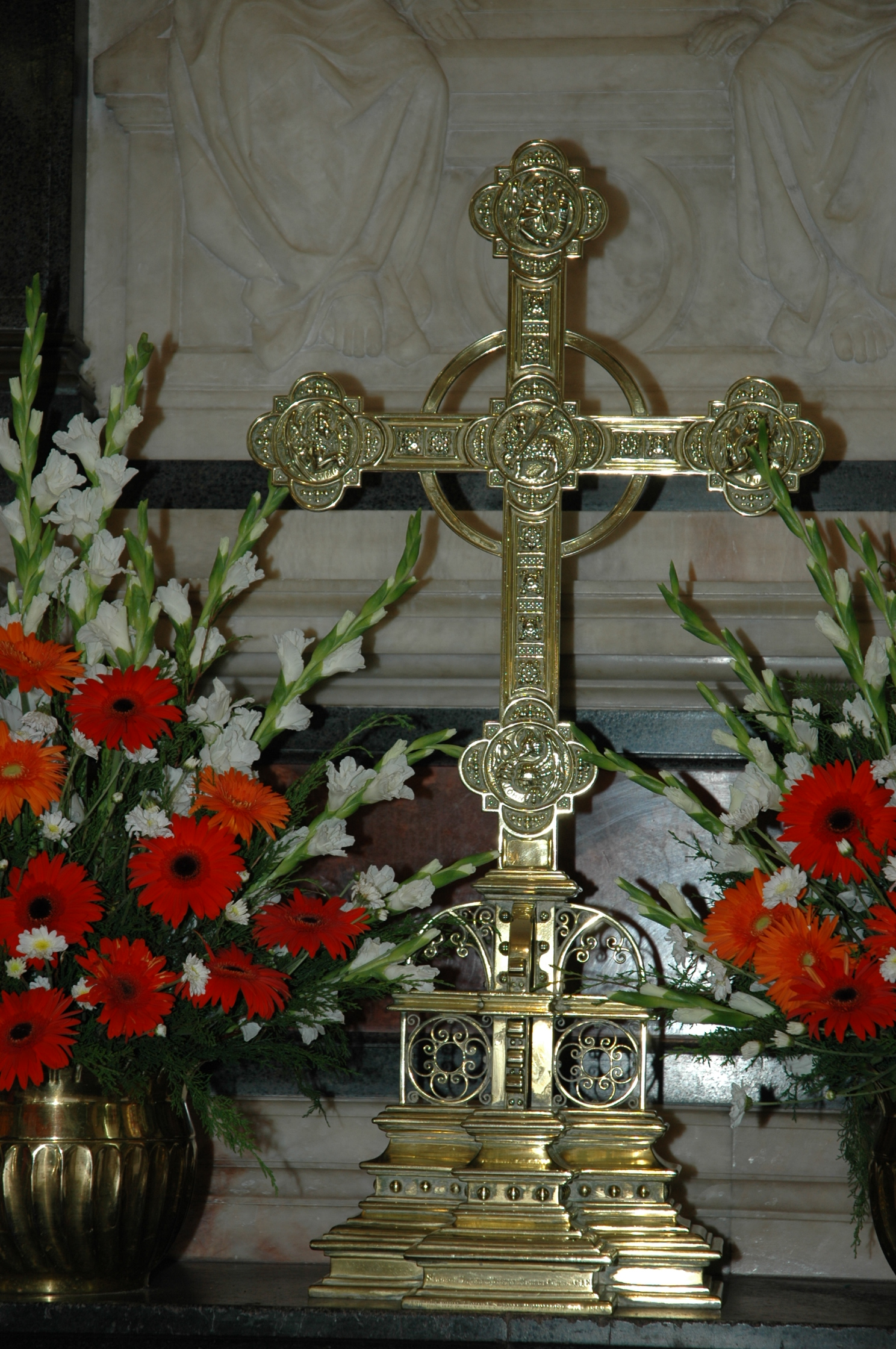
Main altar cross

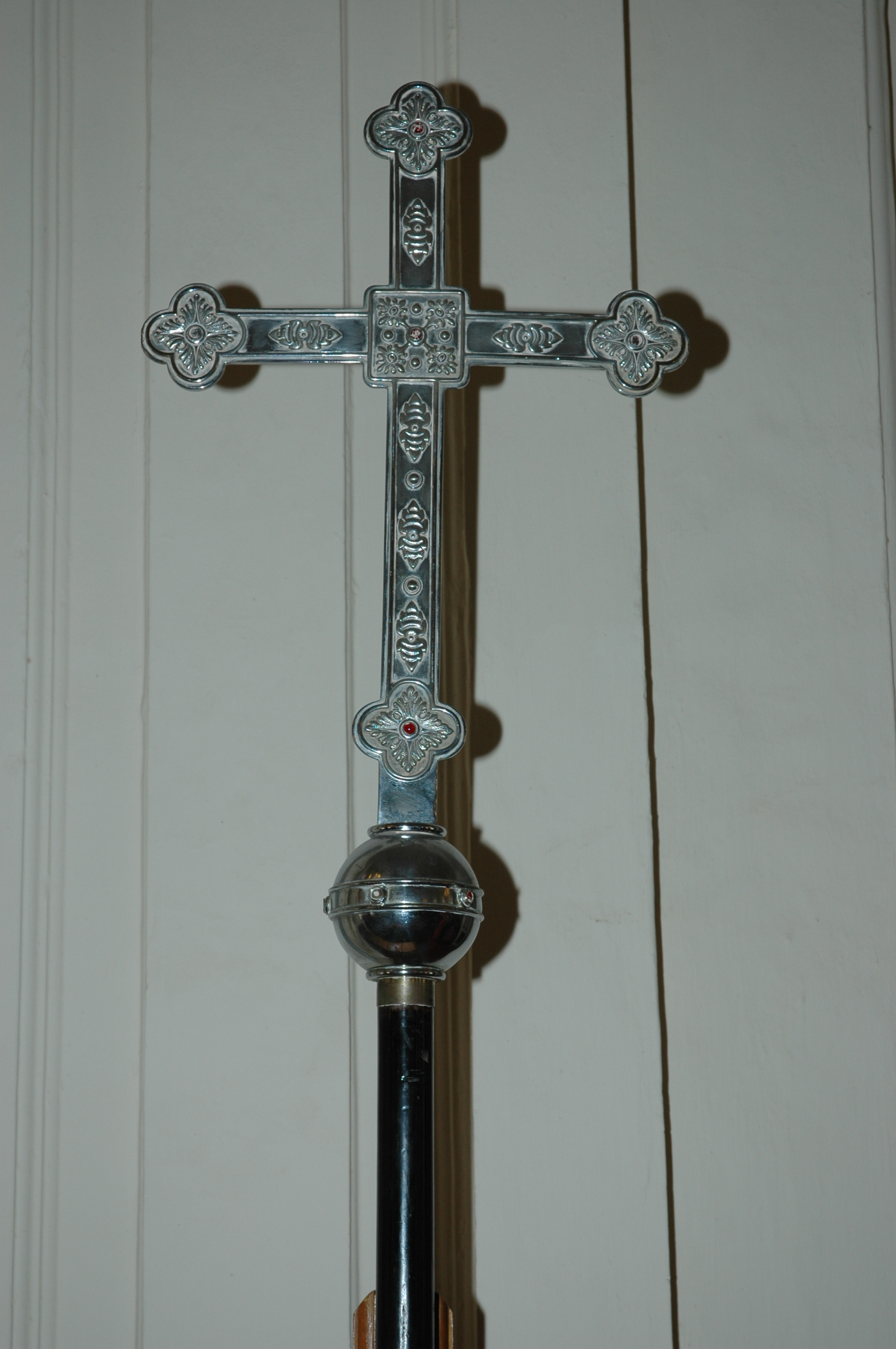
Processional cross

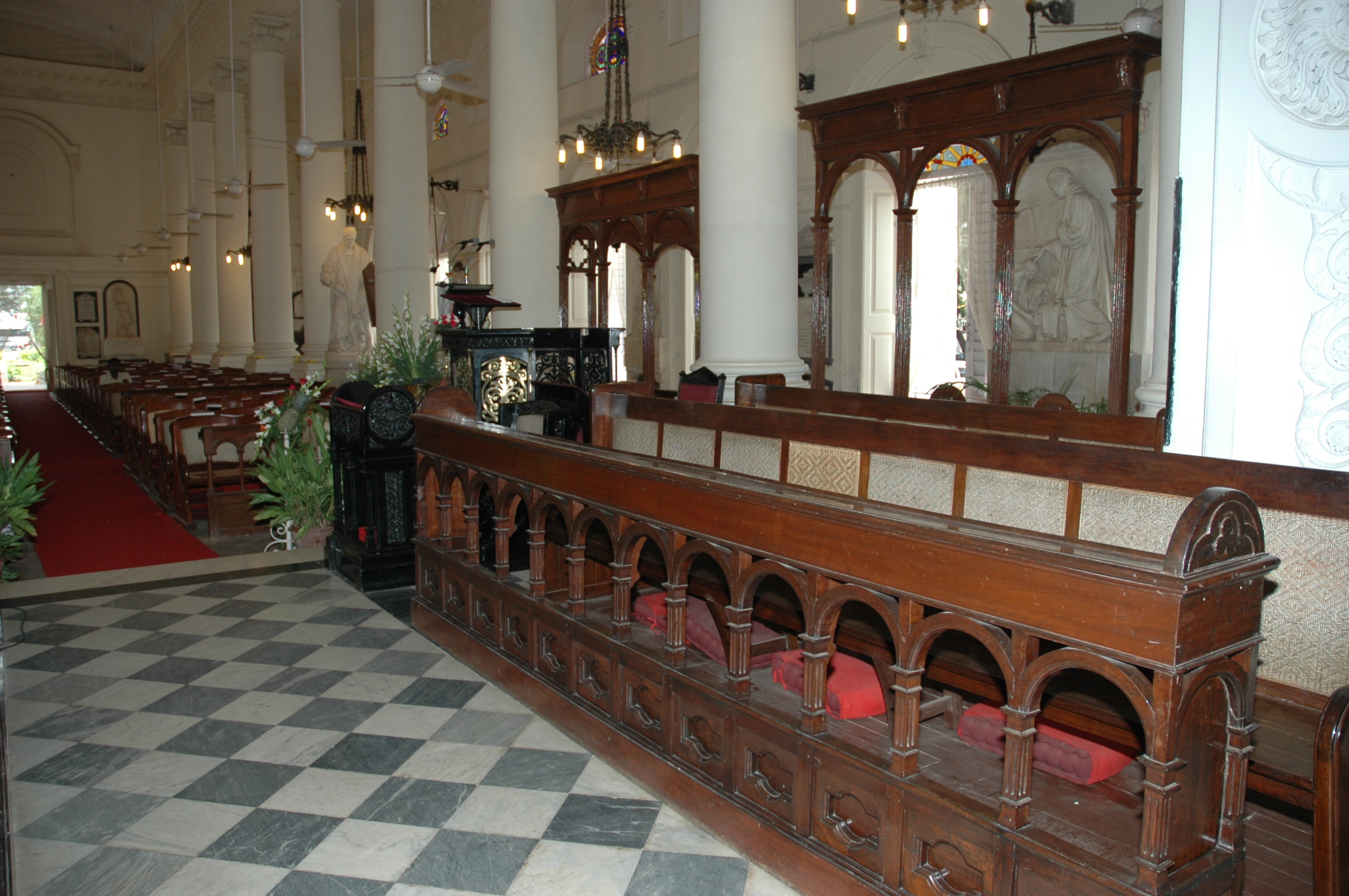
Seats of choristers

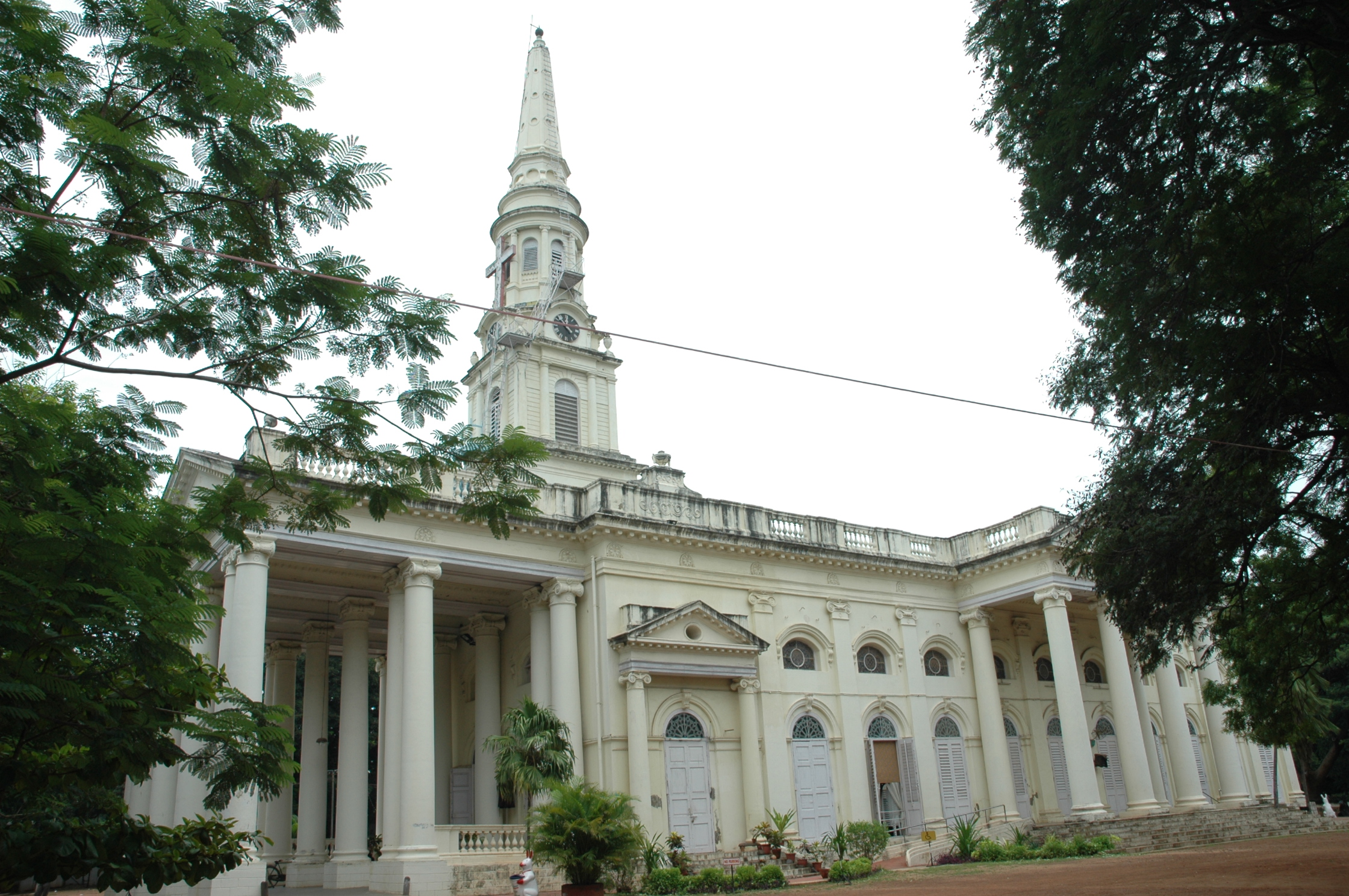
St. George's Cathedral - side view

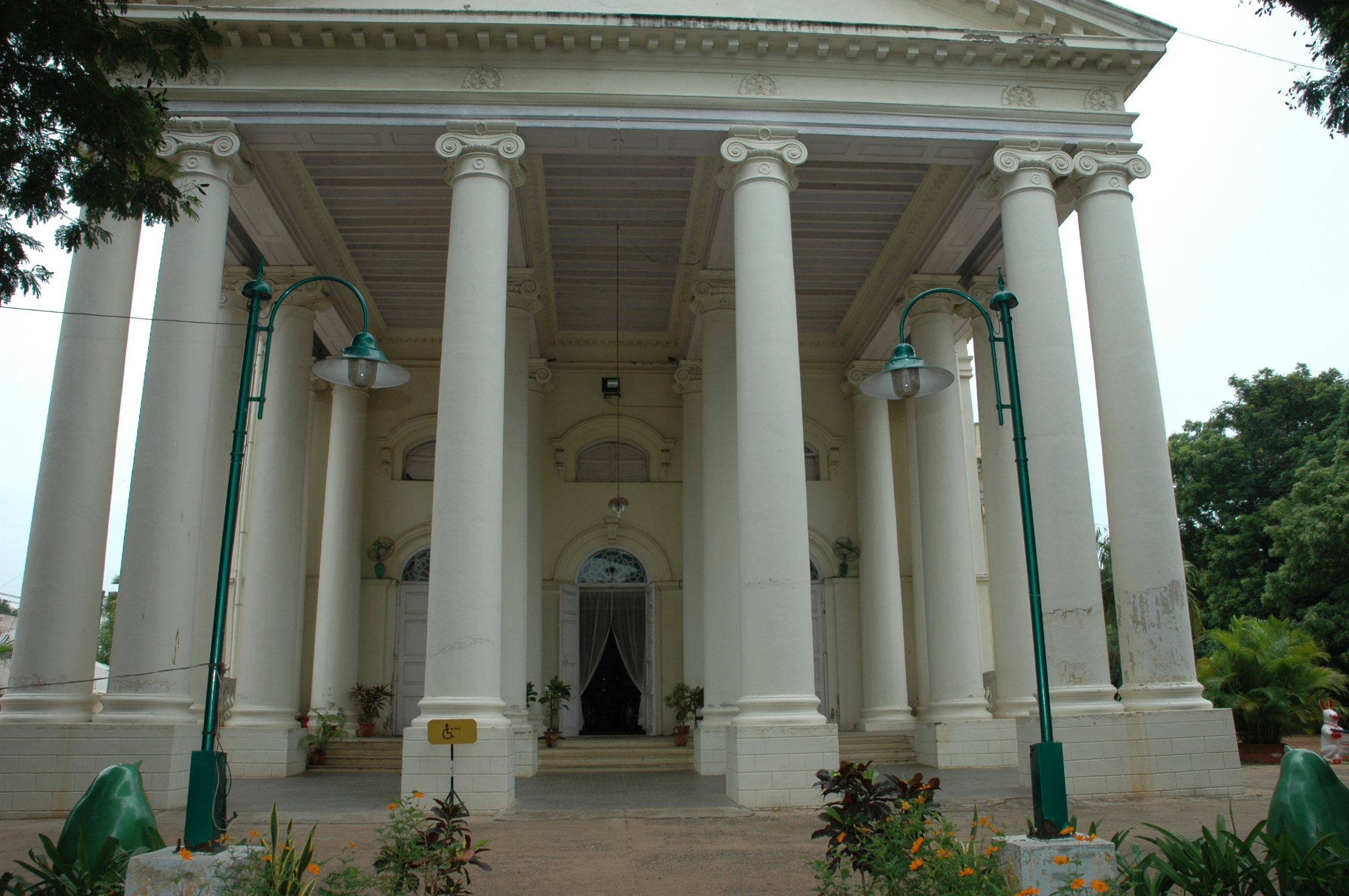
Cathedral - front entrance

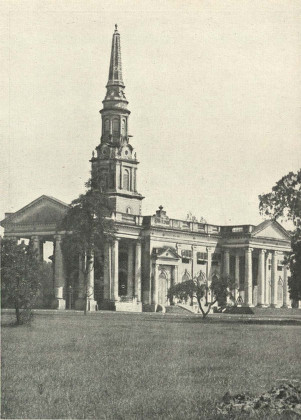
St. George's Cathedral, c. 1905
