= Thomas Moore-Lane =

Irish surgeon (1797–1844)

Thomas Moore-Lane (22 January 1797 – 26 September 1844) was born in County Wexford, Ireland and was son of Robert Moore-Lane of Lansboro, and Emily Gordon. His surname has also been recorded as Moore Lane.

== Career ==
Thomas Moore-Lane (F.R.C.S), was known as an oculist and surgeon and became a physician to the Nawab. He was also the private secretary to the Marquis of Tweedale, Sir Edward Gambier, Governor of Fort St. George. He was a member of the Royal College of Surgeons in 1820, an Assistant Surgeon on 19 January 1822 and a Surgeon on 13 November 1833. He became a Fellow of the Royal College of Surgeons in 1844.

He was the 2nd Superintendent of the Madras Eye Infirmary for a period of 20 years (1824–1844), following the 1st Superintendent and founder, Dr. R. Richardson. A quote from his obituary in the Madras Athenenaeum, 28 September 1844 describes his nature and work ethic as being:

Upright, conscientious, and faithful, he never willingly neglected a duty, and in the prosecution of his career to the very last, if he could not give pleasure, he knew how to lessen the intensity of the feelings allied to disappointment and "hope deferred." The soundness of his judgment on all matters in which he was called to give an opinion, will be generally admitted; and the temper and tone that ran through the whole of his conduct, if it did not, most certainly ought, to have endeared him to all.

== Family ==
He married Eliza Thompson (Born in 1800 in County Wexford, Ireland and died in 1886 in Guildford, Surrey, England) on 7 July 1824 at St. Georges Cathedral, Chennai (Madras) India. Eliza was the daughter of Dr William Thompson and Dorothy Boxwell. They had 8 children, all born in Madras, India:

1. Maj-Gen. Thomas Gordon Moore-Lane (23 July 1825 – 16 April 1893)
2. Dora Jane Moore-Lane (7 January 1828 – 27 May 1877) m. Gen. Edward James Lawder
3. Colonel William Moore-Lane (9 December 1832 – 6 September 1888) m. Eliza Editha Thompson
4. David Frederick Moore-Lane (26 February 1837–November 1886) m. Lilian Caroline Merritt
5. Eliza Emily Moore Lane (2 April 1839 – 6 November 1926) m. Col. David Thompson Hatchell
6. Col. Maitland Moore-Lane (18 December 1841–June 1915) m. Georgina Mildred Cooke.
7. Susan Georgina Moore-Lane (19 October 1843 – 6 March 1846)
8. Col. George Howard Moore-Lane (19 October 1844 – 11 June 1905) m. Mary Theodosia de Courcy.

== Death and memorial ==
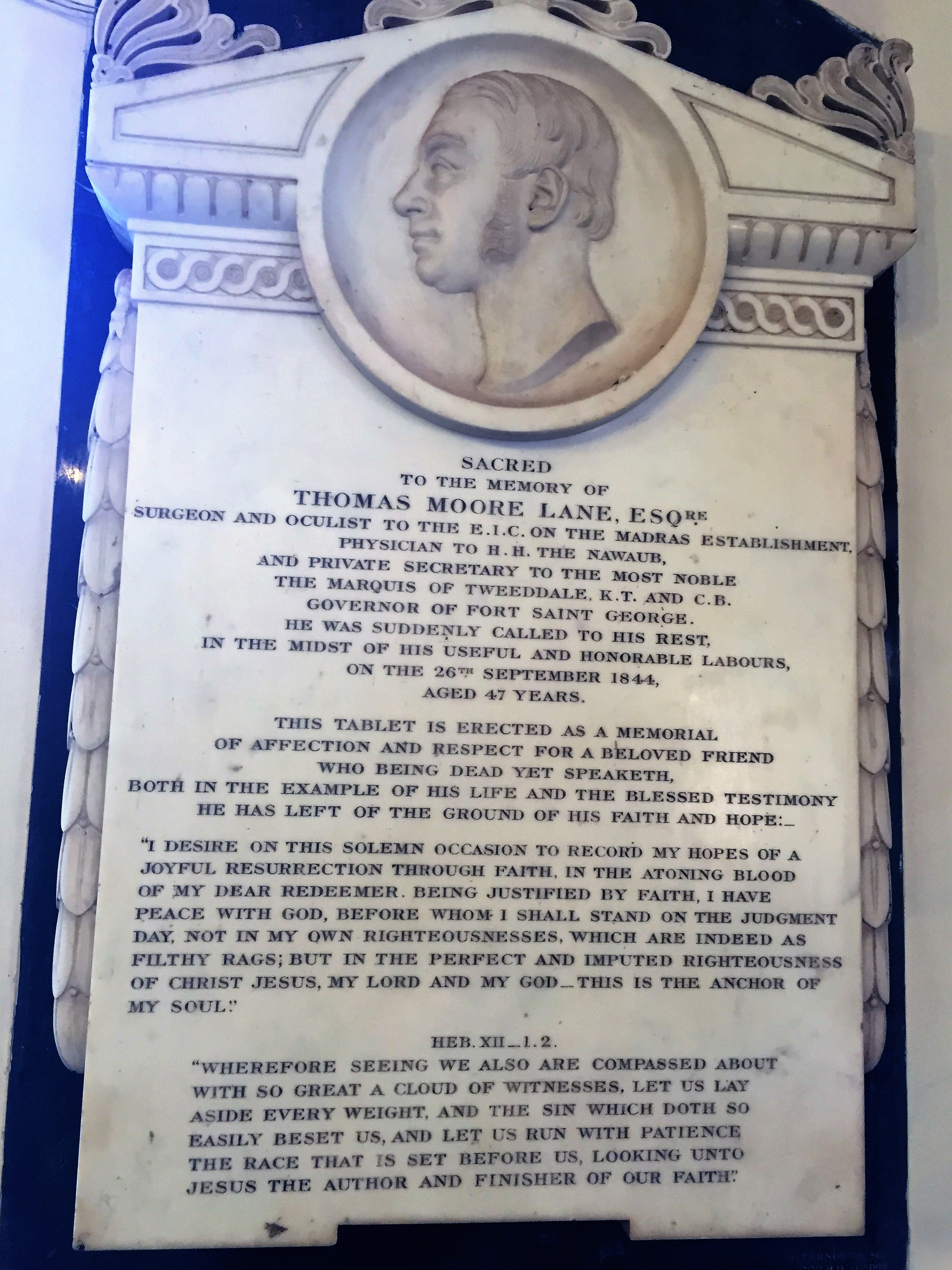
Thomas Moore-Lane Memorial at the St. George's Cathedral, Madras

Thomas Moore-Lane died unexpectedly of cholera on 26 September 1844, after finishing a day's work for the Governor of Fort St. George. A memorial tablet exists in St. Georges Cathedral in Chennai (Madras), India. It contains information on his career and a medallion with a portrait. The inscription on the tablet reads as follows:

Sacred to the memory of Thomas Moore Lane, Esq., Surgeon and Oculist to the East India Company, on the Madras establishment, Physician to His Highness the Nawab and Private Secretary to the Most Noble the Marquis of Tweedale, K.T. and C.B., Governor of Fort St. George. He was suddenly called to his rest in the midst of his useful and honourable labours on 26th September 1844, aged 47 years. This tablet is erected as a memorial of affection and respect for a beloved friend, who being dead yet speaketh both in the example of his life and the blessed testimony he has left of the ground of his faith and hope. Portrait medallion of the deceased by J. Turnouth. He married, July 7th, 1824 Eliza, daughter of W. Thompson, M.D., of Wexford, Ireland.

After his death, Eliza Thompson returned to England and lived in Brighton, Sussex, with the children. Later she moved to St Helier, Jersey, Channel Islands, where other members of her family resided.
