= Edward Sell (priest) =

Anglican orientalist, writer and missionary (1839–1932)

- Born: 24 January 1839; Wantage, England
- Died: 15 February 1932 (aged 93); Bangalore, India
- Education: Church Missionary College in Islington
- Church: Church of England
- Ordained: 1867
- Title: Canon

Canon Edward Sell (24 January 1839 – 15 February 1932) was an Anglican orientalist, writer, and missionary in India.

== Biography ==
Sell was born on 24 January 1839 in Wantage in Berkshire. He was educated at the Church Missionary College in Islington, London, completing his studies in 1862. In 1874 Sell was appointed as a fellow of Madras University and he received a Bachelor of Divinity from Lambeth in 1881. Sell received an honorary Doctor of Divinity from the University of Edinburgh in 1907. He was a member of the Royal Asiatic Society and was awarded the Kaiser-i-Hind Gold Medal in 1906. He was also appointed "Chairman of the Arabic, Persian, and Hindustani Studies".

After finishing his studies in 1862, Sell was ordained deacon and in 1867, priest. Sell served as the examining chaplain for the Bishop of Madras and in 1889 he was appointed canon at St George's Cathedral, Madras. He is commemorated by a plaque in the Cathedral.

In 1865 Sell became the principal of the Harris High School for Muslims in Madras in which capacity he continued until 1881. It was also during this time that he was secretary of the Church Missionary Society for the dioceses of Madras and Travancore. He officially retired from the CMS in 1923, but continued to live in India, involving himself in scholarship and ministry. When he died in Bangalore on 15 February 1932, he was working on his fiftieth book. Sell wrote extensively on Islam and biblical subjects, in particular, the Old Testament. His works include:

- The Faith of Islam, London, 1880
- ʼIlm-I-Tajwīd; or, The Art of Reading the Qurān With an Account of the Rules for the Rasm-Ul-Khat, and a List of the Various Readings of the Last Sura, 1882
- Jāmi'-Ul-Qavānīn. An Urdu Grammar, with Chapters on Rhetoric and Prosody, 1885
- The Historical Development of the Quran, 1897
- Essays on Islam, 1901
- Islam: its Rise and Progress, 1907
- The Religious Orders of Islam, 1908
- The Khulafar-Rashidun, 1909
- The Cult of Ali, 1909
- The Battles of Badr and Uhud, 1909
- Al-Quran, 1909
- Sufiism, 1910
- The Druses, 1910
- Ghazwas and Sariyas, 1911
- The Hanífs, 1912
- Outlines of Islám, 1912
- The Life of Muhammad, 1913
- The Historical Development of the Quran
- Manʹaziruʹl-qawaʹid; a Persian grammar, with chapters on rhetoric and prosody, 1911.
- Baháism, 1912
- Muslims in China, 1913
- Steadfast and Abounding, 1914
- Muslim Conquests in North Africa, 1914
- Muslim Conquests in Spain, 1914
- The Mamluks in Egypt, 1914
- The Umayyad and the ʻAbbasid Khalifates, 1914
- The Ottoman Turks, 1915
- The Minor Prophets, 1922
- The Songs of the Outlaw and Other Songs, Being an Exposition of Some Historical Psalms, 1922
- Daniel, 1923
- After Malachi, 1923
- The Making of a Nation (Judges),1923
- Isaiah (I-XXXIX), 1923
- The Life and Times of Jeremiah, 1923
- Ithna ʻAsharíyya, or, The Twelve Shiʻah Imams, 1923
- The Megilloth, 1924
- Chronicles, Ezra, and Nehemiah, 1924
- Deuteronomy, 1924
- The Book of Job, 1924
- The Kingdom of Israel, 1925
- The Book of Genesis, 1925
- Exodus and Numbers, 1925
- Leviticus, 1925
- The Apocalypses, 1925
- The Kingdom of Judah, 1926
- The Undivided Kingdom, 1926
- The Samaritan and Other Jewish Sects, 1927
- A Guide to the Study of the Canon of the Old and New Testaments, 1927
- The Talmud, Mishnah, and Midrash, 1928
- Studies in Islam, 1928
- Islam in Spain, 1929
- The Áyyub and Mamluk Sultans, 1929
- Messianic Hope, 1929
- Inspiration, 1930
- The Exile, 1931
- Covenants: The Day of the Lord, 1931
- The Glorious Company of the Apostles and Other Sermons, n.d.
