= Thomas Dealtry =

Anglican bishop

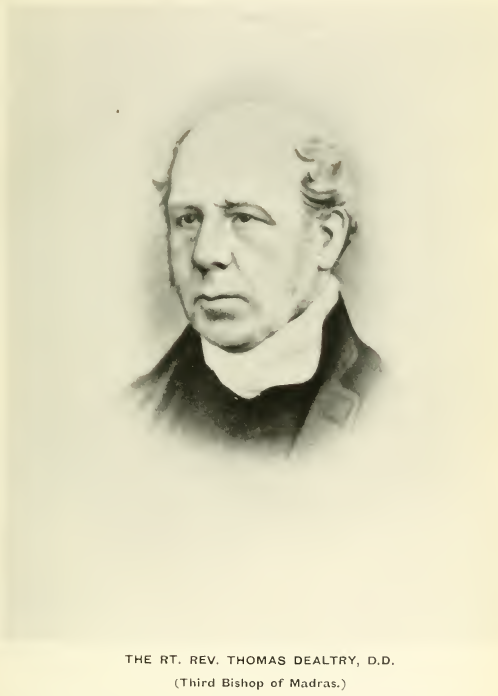
1922 published representation

The Rt Rev Thomas Dealtry (1795–1861) was an Anglican bishop in the 19th century.

== Life ==
He was born into a poor family in Knottingley in Yorkshire in 1796.

Mainly self-taught, Dealtry worked as an usher in a Doncaster school and then as tutor to a private family, where he eloped with the sister of his pupil in 1819. After she died, he married again in 1824. He then studied law at St Catharine's College, Cambridge from 1825, graduating LL.B. in 1828. He was ordained into the Church of England in 1828 and served as Curate of St Peter's Church in Cambridge.

Spotted in his church role by Charles Simeon, he was introduced to Rev Thomas Thomason who had recently returned from Bengal. Together they organised to send Dealtry to India as a chaplain in Bengal where he arrived in January 1829. From 1829 to 1835 he worked in the Old Mission Church in Calcutta.

In 1835 he became Archdeacon of Calcutta, remaining in the post until 1848 when he returned to England on furlough, succeeding Baptist Wriothesley Noel as pastor of St John's Church on Bedford Row.

However he was offered the Bishop of Madras in 1849. and returned for consecration in this post in February 1850. He died in this post on 4 March 1861 and his widow Jane in 1892.

Lord Lugard, whose father was a friend of the Bishop in Madras, had 'Dealtry' as one of his Christian names.

Dealtry's monument in Madras Cathedral was sculpted by Joseph Durham.

== Gallery ==
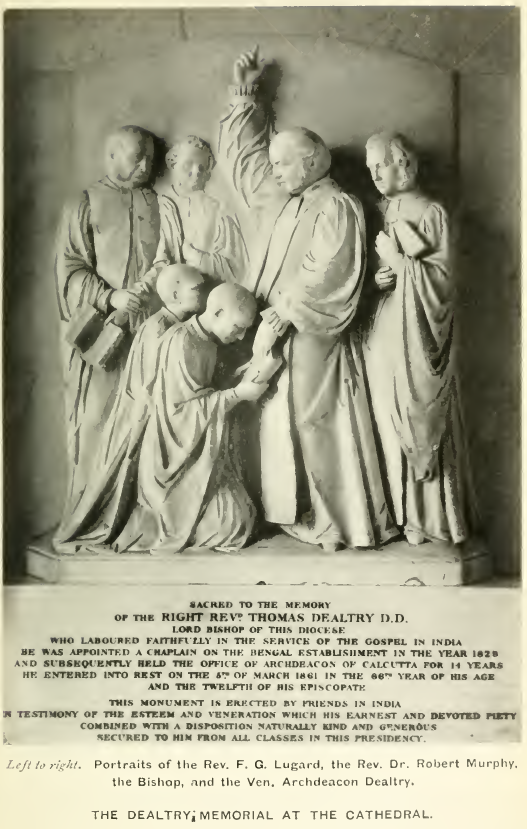
Thomas Dealtry Memorial at the cathedral, Madras, from Rev. Frank Penny's Book 'The Church in Madras, Volume III'(1922)

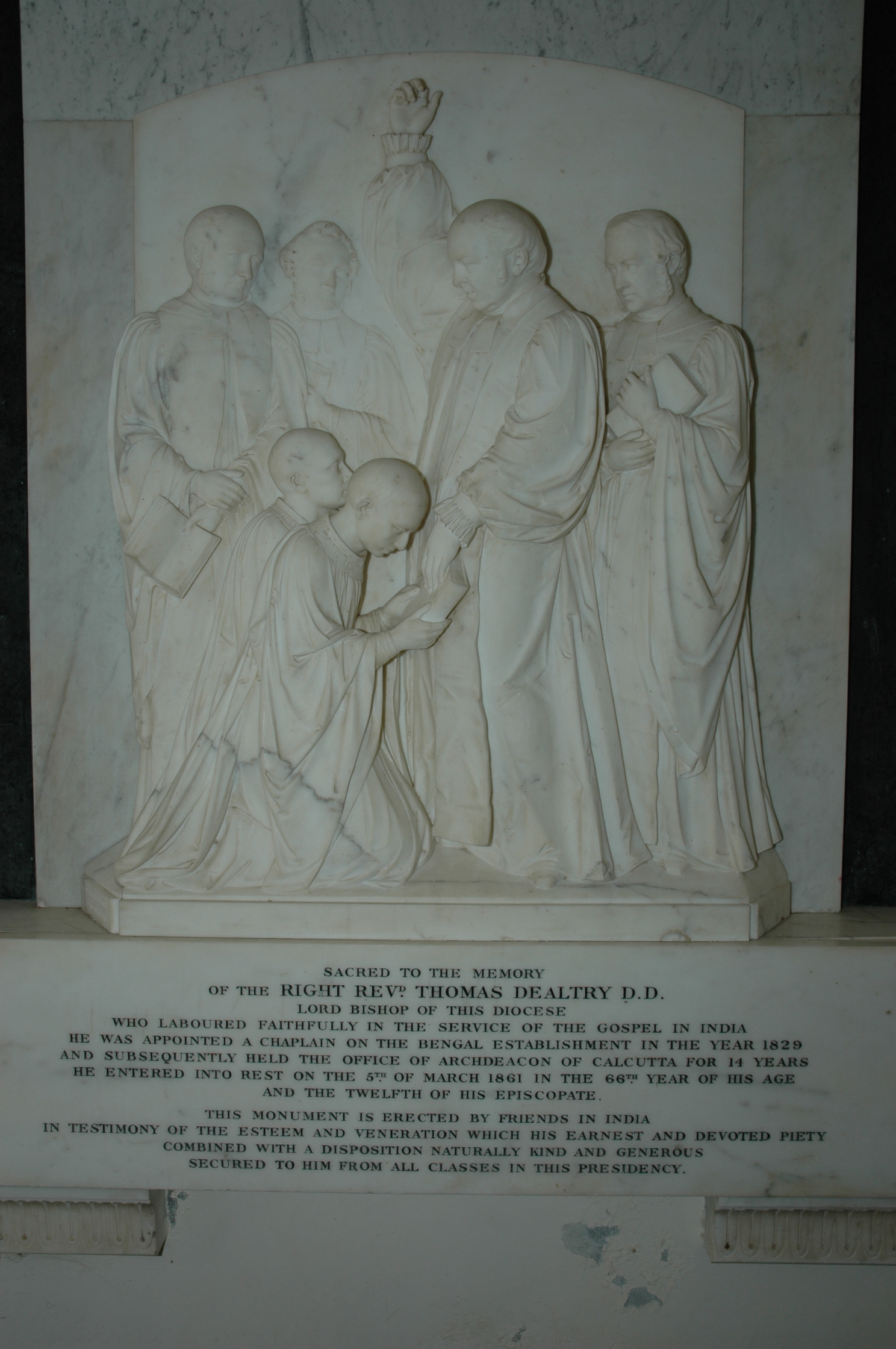
Thomas Dealtry Memorial at the St. George's Cathedral, Madras

== Notes ==
Anglican Communion titles
Preceded by George John Trevor Spencer	Bishop of Madras; 1849–1861	Succeeded by Frederick Gell
