= John Mousley =

Inaugural Archdeacon of Madras

John Mousley (26 January 1772 – 31 August 1819) was an Anglican priest in India in the early 19th century, most notably the inaugural Archdeacon of Madras.

Mousley was born in Warwickshire and educated at Trinity College, Oxford, matriculating in 1793, and graduating B.A. in 1800. He was a fellow of Balliol College, Oxford, from 1802 to 1816.
