= Henry Whitehead (bishop) =

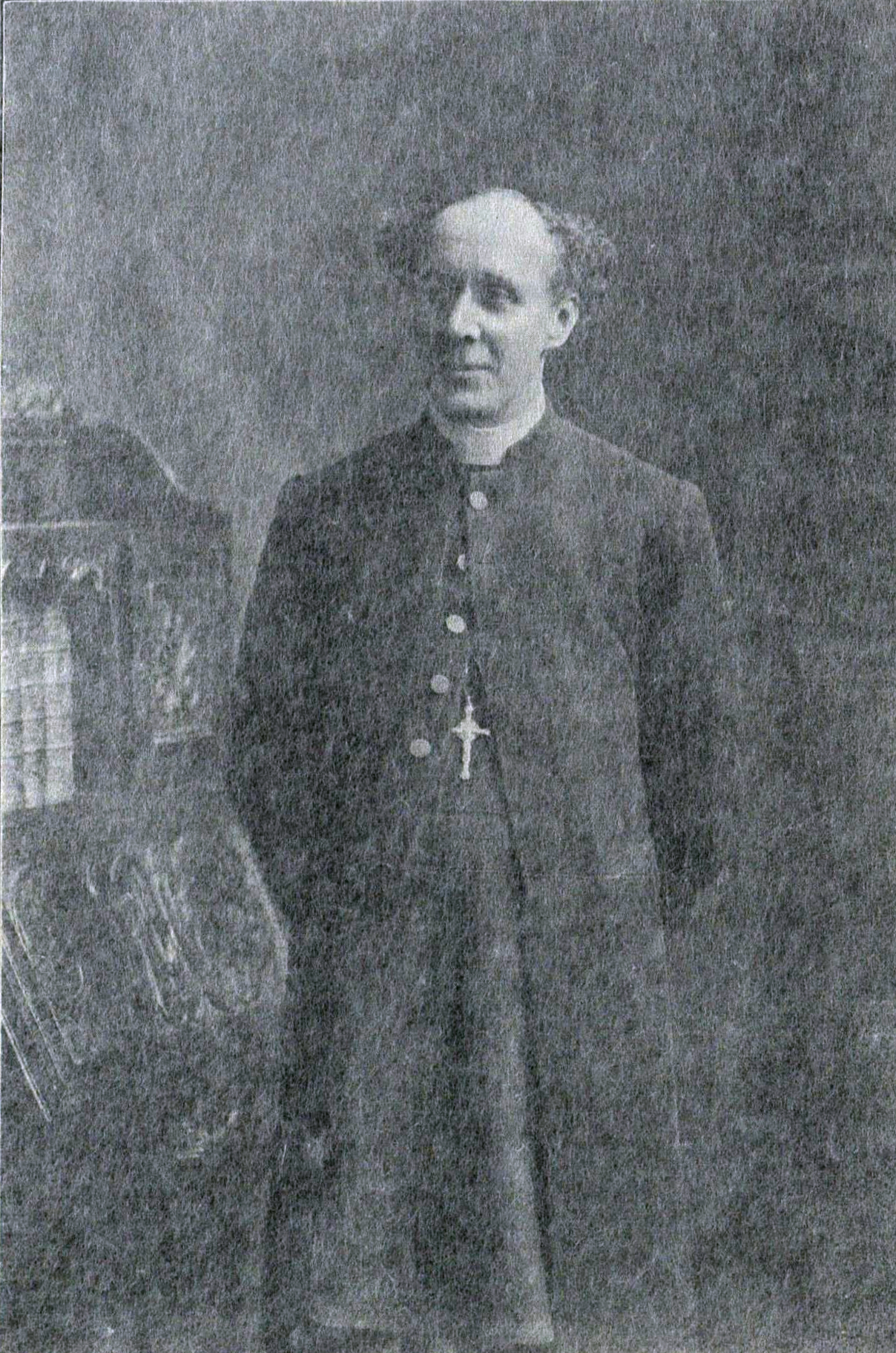

Henry Whitehead (19 December 1853 – 14 April 1947) was an eminent Anglican bishop in the last decade of the 19th century and the first quarter of the 20th.

== Biography ==
Whitehead was educated at Sherborne and Trinity College, Oxford. Ordained in 1879, his first post was as a preacher at St Nicholas, Abingdon. He then emigrated to India where he was principal of Bishop’s College, Calcutta from 1883 to 1899. On St Peter's Day (29 June) 1899, he was consecrated a bishop by Frederick Temple, Archbishop of Canterbury, at St Paul's Cathedral, to serve as the fifth Bishop of Madras, an office he held for 23 years. In 1903 he married Isabel Duncan. A noted author on his adopted country, he died on 14 April 1947. He had become a Doctor of Divinity (DD).

Whitehead was the brother of the philosopher Alfred North Whitehead and the father of the mathematician J. H. C. Whitehead.

== Publications ==
- Whitehead, Henry (1916). The Village Gods of South India. Humphrey Milford. ISBN 9780554515168.
- Whitehead, Henry (1924). Indian Problems in Religion, Education, Politics. Constable.
- Anderson, George; Whitehead, Henry (1932). Christian Education in India. Macmillan.

Anglican Communion titles
| Preceded by Frederick Gell | Bishop of Madras; 1899–1922 | Succeeded by Edward Waller |
