= Flaxman =

Flaxman is both a surname and a given name. Notable people with the name include:

== Surname ==
- Alfred Flaxman (1879–1916), British track and field athlete
- Charles Flaxman (1806–1869), Australian clerk
- John Flaxman (1755–1826), English sculptor and draughtsman
- Maria Flaxman (1768–1833) English illustrator, half-sister of John
- George Flaxman, a British Army private executed for murder in 1887

== Given name ==
- Flaxman Charles John Spurrell (1842–1915), English archaeologist, geologist and photographer
- Flaxman Low, fictional occult detective

== See also ==
- Flaxman crater, a meteorite crater in South Australia
- Flaxman Gallery, a collection of works by John Flaxman at the University College London
- Flaxman Island, the location of the Leffingwell Camp Site in Alaska
- Flaxman typeface, designed by Edward Wright for New Scotland Yard
- FLAxman, a 1927 London telephone exchange on the Director telephone system, which was replaced in about 1968 by the dialling code 352-xxxx
