= Frederick Gell =

Frederick Gell (24 September 1820 – 25 March 1902) was an eminent Anglican clergyman and Bishop of Madras 1861-1899.

Gell was born in 1820, the son of Philip Gell, rector of Derby. He was educated at Trinity College, Cambridge, where he graduated in 1843. Following graduation, he was appointed a Fellow at Christ's College, Cambridge, and later that year ordained deacon. Ordination as a priest followed the next year. In 1849, he was elected lecturer, and later dean and assistant tutor of the College.

His first ecclesiastical post was as a Curate at Great St Mary's, Cambridge, and in 1858 he was appointed Cambridge preacher at the Chapel Royal, Whitehall. The following year he left Cambridge to become Domestic Chaplain to Archibald Campbell Tait, Bishop of London, and two years later, in 1861, he became the fourth Bishop of Madras. He held the office for over a quarter of a century, until he resigned from ill-health in 1899.

Gell chose to stay in India after his resignation. He died at Culford, Coonoor, South India, on 25 March 1902.

Church of England titles
Preceded by Thomas Dealtry	Bishop of Madras; 1861–1899	Succeeded by Henry Whitehead
