= Christianity in Tamil Nadu =

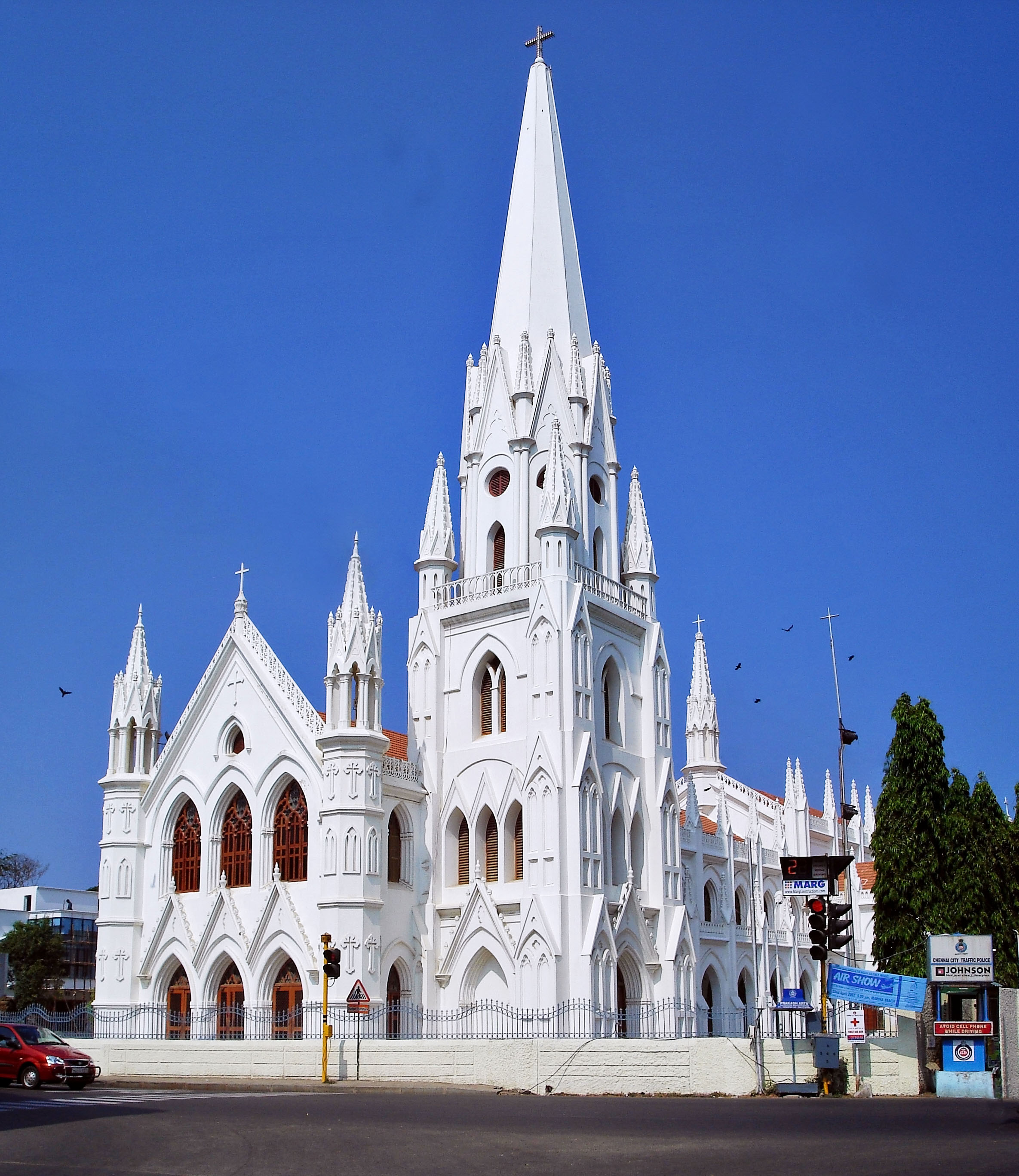
San Thome Basilica, Chennai is built over the site where St. Thomas is believed to be originally interred

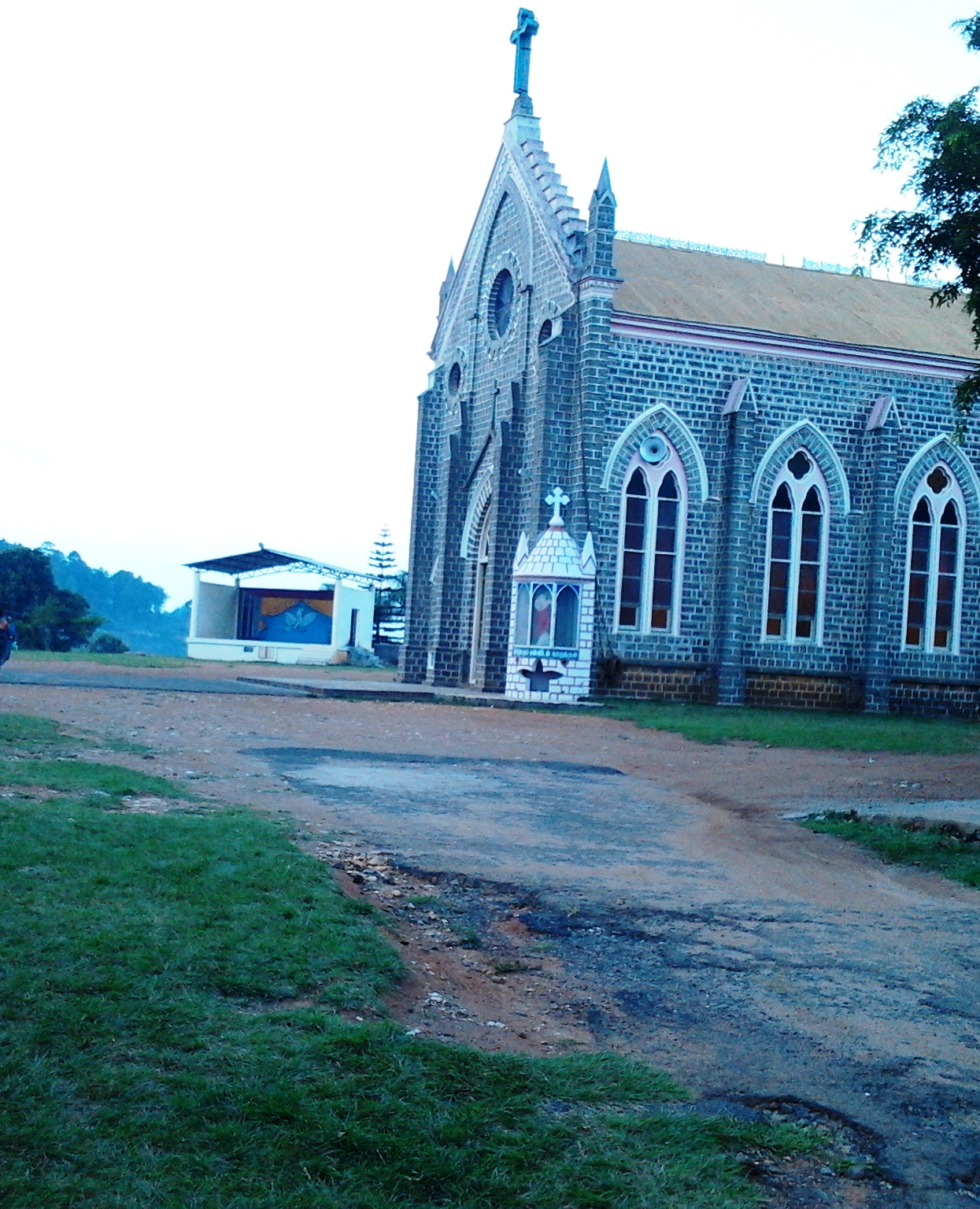
Church at Yercaud

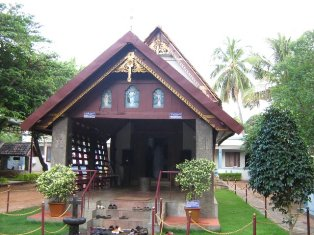
Thiruvithamcode Arappally in Kanyakumari district under Malankara Orthodox Syrian Church is believed to be built by Thomas the Apostle

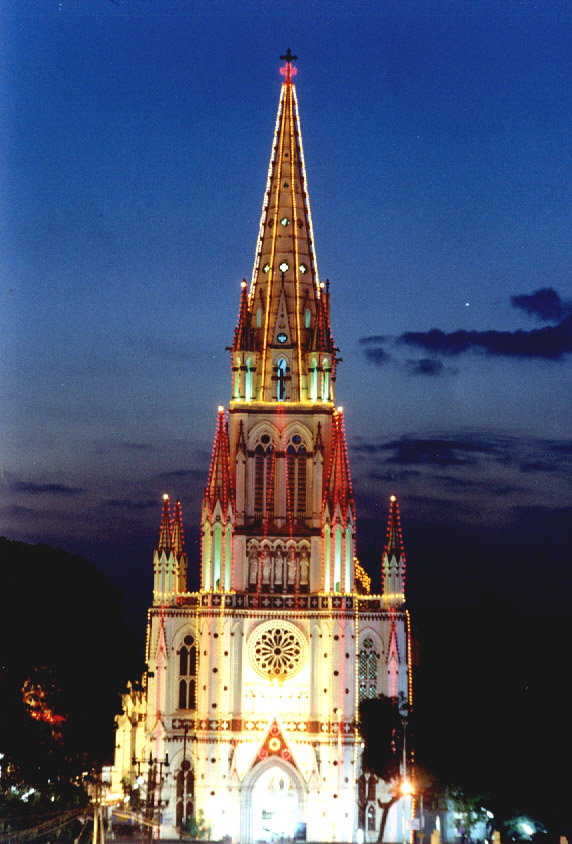
Our Lady of Lourdes Latin Catholic Church in Tiruchirappalli

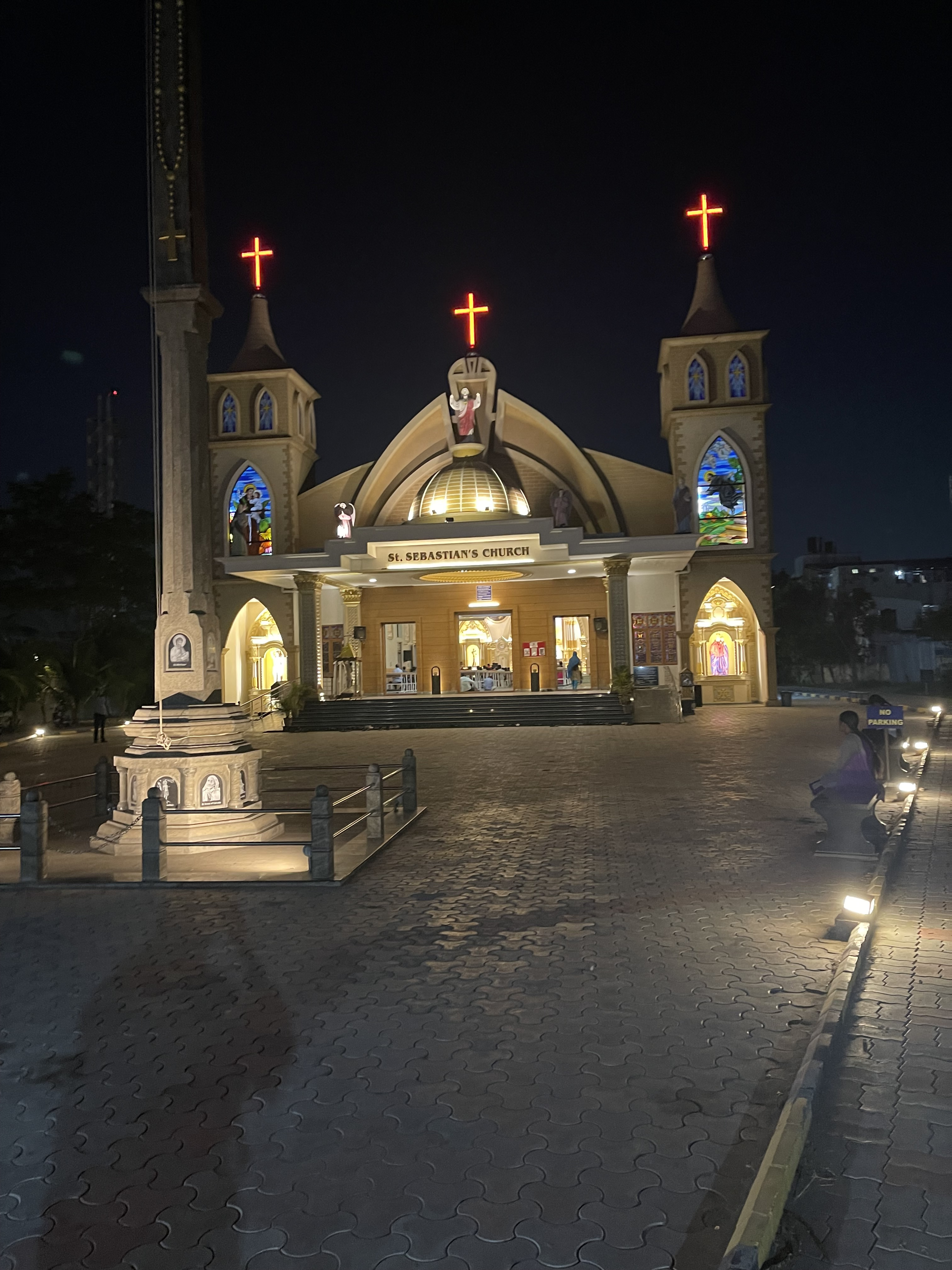
St. Sebastian's Church in Coimbatore

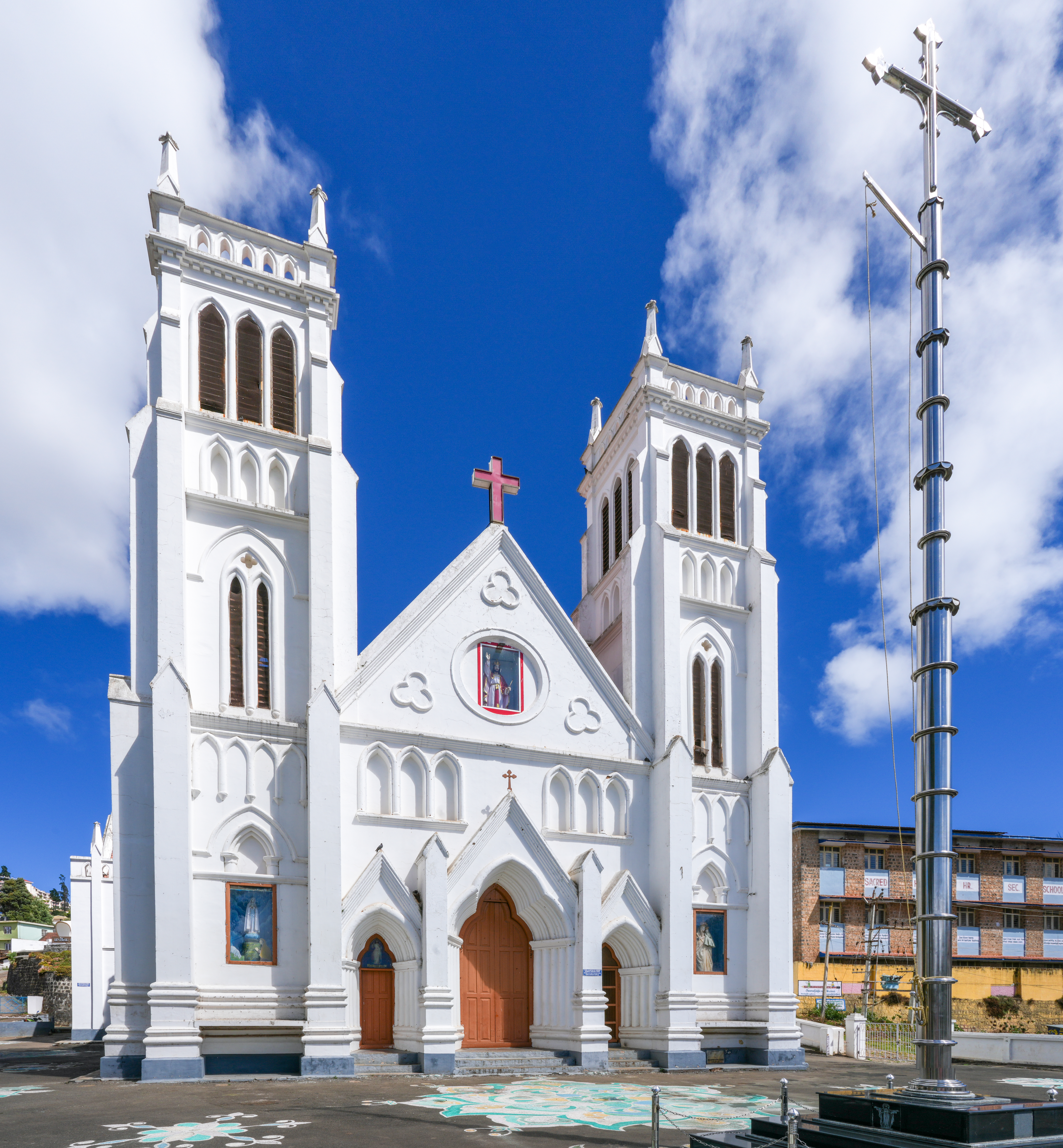
Sacred Heart Cathedral, Ooty

Christianity is the second largest religion in the state of Tamil Nadu in India. According to tradition, St. Thomas, one of the twelve apostles of Jesus, sailed to the Malabar Coast in AD 52. In the colonial age many Portuguese, Dutch, British and Italian Christians came to Tamil Nadu. Priests accompanied them not only to minister the colonisers but also to spread the Christian faith among the non-Christians in Tamil Nadu. Currently, Christians are a minority community comprising approximately 6% of the total population. Christians are mainly concentrated in the southern districts of Tamil Nadu – Kanyakumari (47.7% of the population, 2011), Thoothukudi (19%, 2011) and Tirunelveli (15%, 2011).

The Catholic Church (including the Latin Church, Syro-Malabar Church and Syro-Malankara Catholic Church), the Church of South India, the Pentecostals, The Salvation Army Church, the Jacobite Syrian Christian Church, the Malankara Orthodox Syrian Church, the Evangelical Church of India, the Apostolics and other evangelical denominations constitute the Christian population in Tamil Nadu. The Latin Church of the Catholic Church has 18 dioceses and has a homogeneous presence throughout the state. The second-largest church by the number of members is the Church of South India with eight dioceses in Tamil Nadu. They are Coimbatore Diocese, Kanyakumari Diocese, Madras Diocese, Madurai-Ramnad Diocese, Thoothukudi – Nazareth Diocese, Tirunelveli Diocese, Trichy-Tanjore Diocese and the Vellore Diocese. Church of South India Synod, the highest administrative body of the Church of South India is in Chennai. The vast majority of Christians in Tamil Nadu are either Latin Catholics or members of the Church of South India. The Pentecostal Mission (TPM) is headquartered in Chennai. The Congregational churches were a small group called The London Missionary Society (LMS) run under Travancore Church Council (TCC) with its headquarters in Nagercoil. The London Mission Congregational churches date back to 1795 when British missionaries were sent to 19th century Tamil Nadu and Kerala States of South India.

== Salvation Army in Tamil Nadu ==
The Salvation Army is an International Christian Church and charitable organisation. There are six territories in India; Eastern, Western, Northern, Central, South Eastern and South Western Territory. Tamil Nadu and Pondicherry come under the Central and South Eastern Territory. There are more than 1000 churches over Tamil Nadu and Pondicherry. School, colleges, homes, shelters, and medical services are provided here. The Salvation Army does missionary, medical, educational, emergency disaster, and social services.

The Salvation Army operation commenced on 27 May 1892 as a result of the vision received by Major Deva Sundaram at "Medicine Hill" near Nagercoil in Kanyakumari District. He had been praying and fasting with three officers in South Tamil Nadu. As the Army experienced rapid growth in South India, the territory was separated from Southern Territory on 1 October 1970. States included in the territory: Tamil Nadu, Pondicherry. 'The Salvation Army' in Tamil: Ratchaniya Senai in Malayalam: Raksha Sainyam. Languages in which the gospel is preached: English, Malayalam, Tamil. Periodicals: Chiruveeran (Tamil), Home League Quarterly, Poresatham (Tamil), The Officer (Tamil)

== Saint Thomas Christian denominations ==
In 1996, the Syro-Malabar Catholic Church created its first `Diocese of Thuckalay` in Kanyakumari district, (which was under the Syro-Malabar Catholic Archdiocese of Changanassery in Kerala till then), of Tamil Nadu. The same year the Syro-Malankara Catholic Church has also newly established the `Diocese of Marthandam` (bifurcated from its Archdiocese of Trivandrum) in Kanyakumari district. The Malankara Orthodox Syrian Church established its first diocese Chennai Diocese in the year 1979. St. Thomas Mount in Chennai, the place where St. Thomas, one of the disciples of Jesus Christ, was believed to have been martyred, is an important pilgrimage site for Indian Christians. The Santhome Basilica, supposedly built atop the tomb of St. Thomas, and the Vailankanni Basilica of Our Lady of Good Health – revered churches by India's Roman Catholics – are good examples of majestic church architectures in Tamil Nadu.

== In Kanyakumari district ==
Kanyakumari District has the highest number of christians, both in absolute numbers and as a percentage, among the districts of Tamilnadu and is one of the districts with the highest concentration of Christians in India.

One of the disciples of Jesus Christ, St. Thomas, introduced Christianity in the areas of what is now Kanyakumari District. He built a church in Thiruvithamcode in 63 AD. The church is considered to be one of the oldest churches in the world that still has daily prayers, and the oldest church in Tamilnadu.

In the 16th century, thousands of people in the coastal areas converted to Catholicism due to the efforts of St. Francis Xavier and Portuguese missionaries. St. Francis Xavier primarily resided at Kottar, Nagercoil during his missionary work in the region. During this time there was already a chapel at Kottar dedicated to Mary, the Mother of Jesus. St. Xavier celebrated Mass and prayed at this Church during his stay. The chapel is now part of the St. Francis Xavier's Cathedral, Kottar. St. Francis Xavier's Cathedral, Kottar is believed to be the first church dedicated to the great missionary-saint in the world. As per church records, it was dedicated to the saint in the year 1605.

A native of the district, Devasahayam Pillai, who was martyred in the 18th century, was canonized and made a Catholic saint by Pope Francis in 2022. He is the first layman-saint in India.

In the 18th century (1806) European missionary William Tobias Ringeltaube established Protestant churches and propagated Christianity in Kanyakumari district and South Travancore. He built the first Protestant Church in Mylaudy.

== Demographics ==
Christians in Tamil Nadu
Year	Number	Percentage
1951	1,427,382	4.74
1961	1,762,954	5.23
1971	2,367,749	5.75
1981	2,798,048	5.78
1991	3,179,410	5.69
2001	3,785,060	6.06
2011	4,418,331	6.12

=== Population by districts ===
Districts with significant percentage of Christians as per 2001 census
District	Christian (numbers)	Christian (%)
Tamil Nadu	37,85,060	6.02
Kanyakumari	745,406	44.47
Thoothukudi	262,718	16.71
The Nilgiris	87,272	11.45
Tirunelveli	296,578	10.89
Tiruchirappalli	218,033	9.02
Chennai	331,261	7.63
Dindigul	145,265	7.55
Ramanathapuram	84,092	7.13
Tiruvallur	169,719	6.16
Kanchipuram	170,416	5.92
Sivaganga	67,739	5.86
Thanjavur	124,945	5.64
Ariyalur	36,261	5.21
Pudukkottai	66,432	4.55
Coimbatore	185,737	4.35
Viluppuram	115,745	3.91
Virudhunagar	68,295	3.90
Madurai	86,352	3.35
Cuddalore	73,611	3.22
Theni	33,830	3.09
Nagapattinam	45,780	3.07
Vellore	102,477	2.95
Tiruvarur	31,621	2.70
Tiruvannamalai	55,180	2.52
Erode	55,414	2.15
Perambalur	8,412	1.70
Salem	50,450	1.67
Karur	13,863	1.48
Dharmapuri	39,019	1.37
Namakkal	13,137	0.88

Districts with significant percentage of Christians as per 2011 census
District	Christian (numbers)	Christian (%)
Tamil Nadu	44,18,336	6.12
Kanyakumari	876,299	46.85
Thoothukudi	291,908	16.68
The Nilgiris	84,610	11.51
Tirunelveli	342,254	11.12
Tiruchirappalli	246,156	9.04
Dindigul	169,945	7.87
Chennai	358,662	7.72
Ramanathapuram	91,139	6.73
Kanchipuram	256,762	6.42
Tiruvallur	233,633	6.27
Sivaganga	75,481	5.64
Thanjavur	133,971	5.57
Coimbatore	190,314	5.50
Ariyalur	37,403	4.95
Pudukkottai	72,850	4.50
Viluppuram	138,279	4.00
Virudhunagar	67,405	3.47
Madurai	97,711	3.22
Cuddalore	83,334	3.20
Theni	37,574	3.02
Nagapattinam	47,579	2.94
Vellore	111,390	2.83
Tiruppur	70,015	2.82
Tiruvannamalai	66,987	2.72
Tiruvarur	33,621	2.63
Erode	55,899	2.48
Krishnagiri	36,898	1.91
Perambalur	10,310	1.82
Salem	58,450	1.55
Karur	16,863	1.55
Namakkal	16,898	0.98
Dharmapuri	14,089	0.94

== Important basilicas ==
=== San Thome Basilica ===
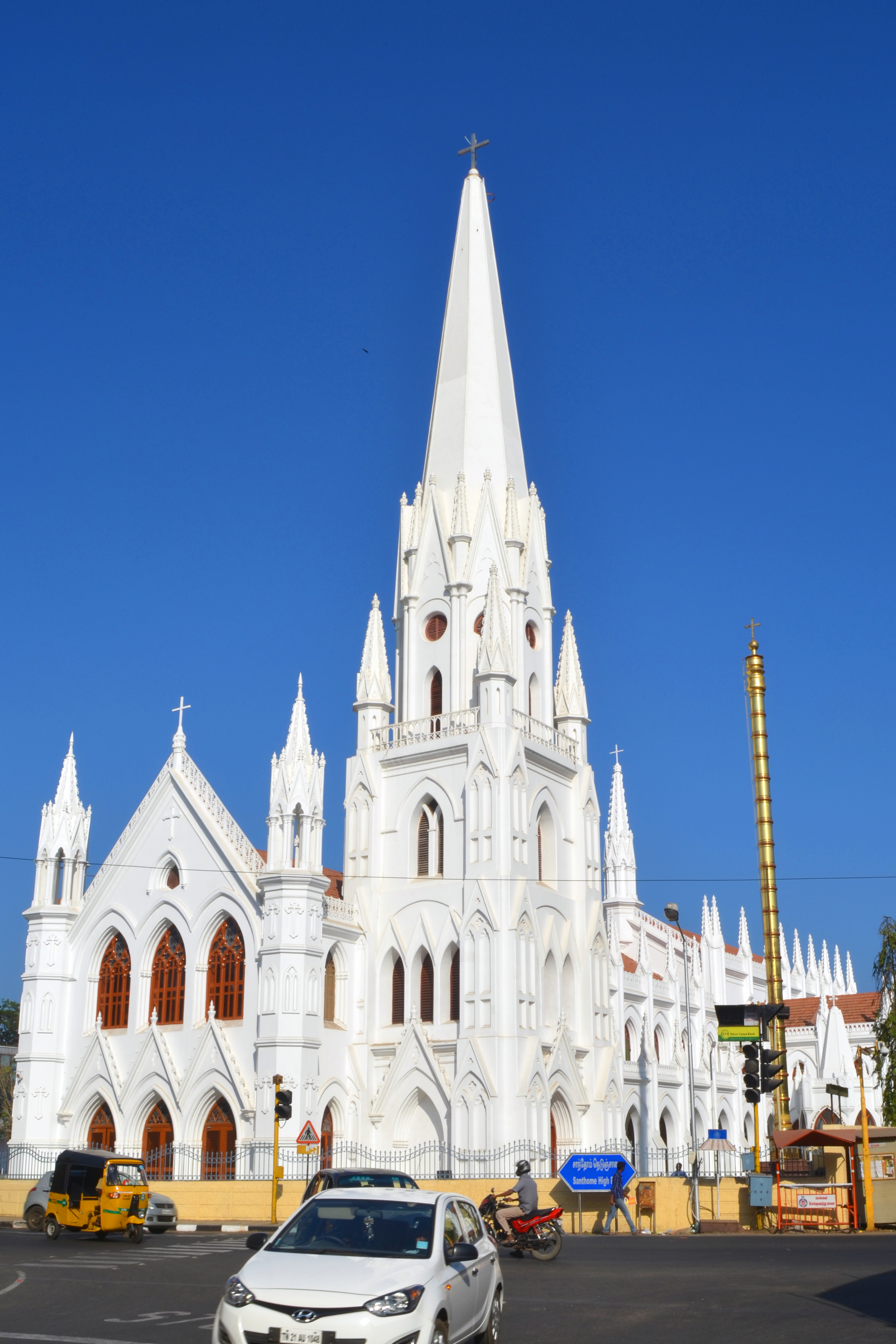
Santhome Cathedral built in 1523

San Thome Basilica is a Roman Catholic (Latin Rite) minor basilica and one of the three National Shrines in India located in Santhome, Chennai city (Madras), India. It was built in the 1523 by Portuguese explorers, and rebuilt again with the status of a cathedral by the British in 1893. The British version still stands today. It was designed in Neo-Gothic style, favoured by British architects in the late 19th century. Christian tradition holds that St. Thomas arrived in Kerala & Kanyakumari Dist in 52 AD preached between 52 AD and 72 AD, when he was believed to be martyred on St. Thomas Mount. The basilica is built over the site where he was believed originally to be interred.

San Thome Basilica is the principal church of the Madras-Mylapore Catholic Archdiocese. In 1956, Pope Pius XII raised the church to the status of a Minor Basilica, and on 11 February 2006, it was declared a national shrine by the Catholic Bishops' Conference of India. The San Thome Basilica is a pilgrimage centre for Christians in India. This church is a very important site in the world for Christians. The church also has an attached museum at back.

=== Basilica of Our Lady of Good Health, Velankanni ===
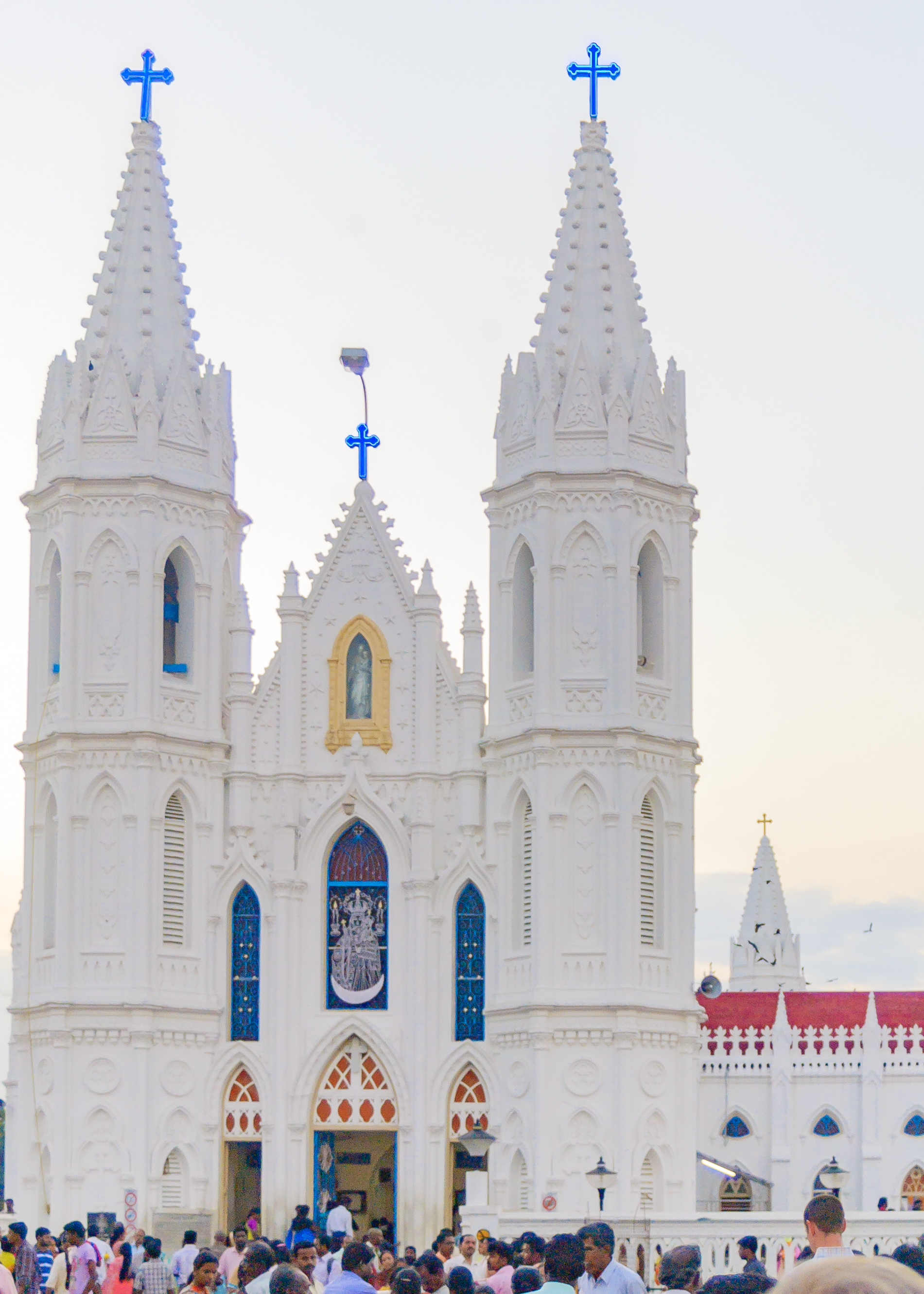
Basilica of Our Lady of Good Health in Velankanni, Tamil Nadu Entrance

The Basilica of Our Lady of Good Health is located in the small town of Velankanni in the state of Tamil Nadu in Southern India. The Roman Catholic basilica is devoted to Our Lady of Good Health. Devotion to Our Lady of Good Health of Velankanni can be traced to the mid-16th century and is attributed to three miracles at different sites around where the basilica currently stands: the apparition of Mary and the Christ Child to a slumbering shepherd boy, the curing of a lame buttermilk vendor, and the rescue of Portuguese sailors from a violent sea storm.

Although all three apparitions ultimately resulted in the erection of a shrine to our Lady, it was the promise of the Portuguese sailors that was the proximate cause of a permanent edifice being built at Velankanni. The chapel was dedicated on the feast of the Nativity of the Blessed Virgin Mary (8 September), the day of their safe landing. More than 500 years later, the nine-day festival and celebration is still observed and draws nearly 5 million pilgrims each year. The Shrine of Our Lady of Vailankanni, also known as the "Lourdes of the East," is one of the most important Christian religious sites frequented by Christians in India.

=== Basilica of Our Lady of Snows, Thoothukudi ===
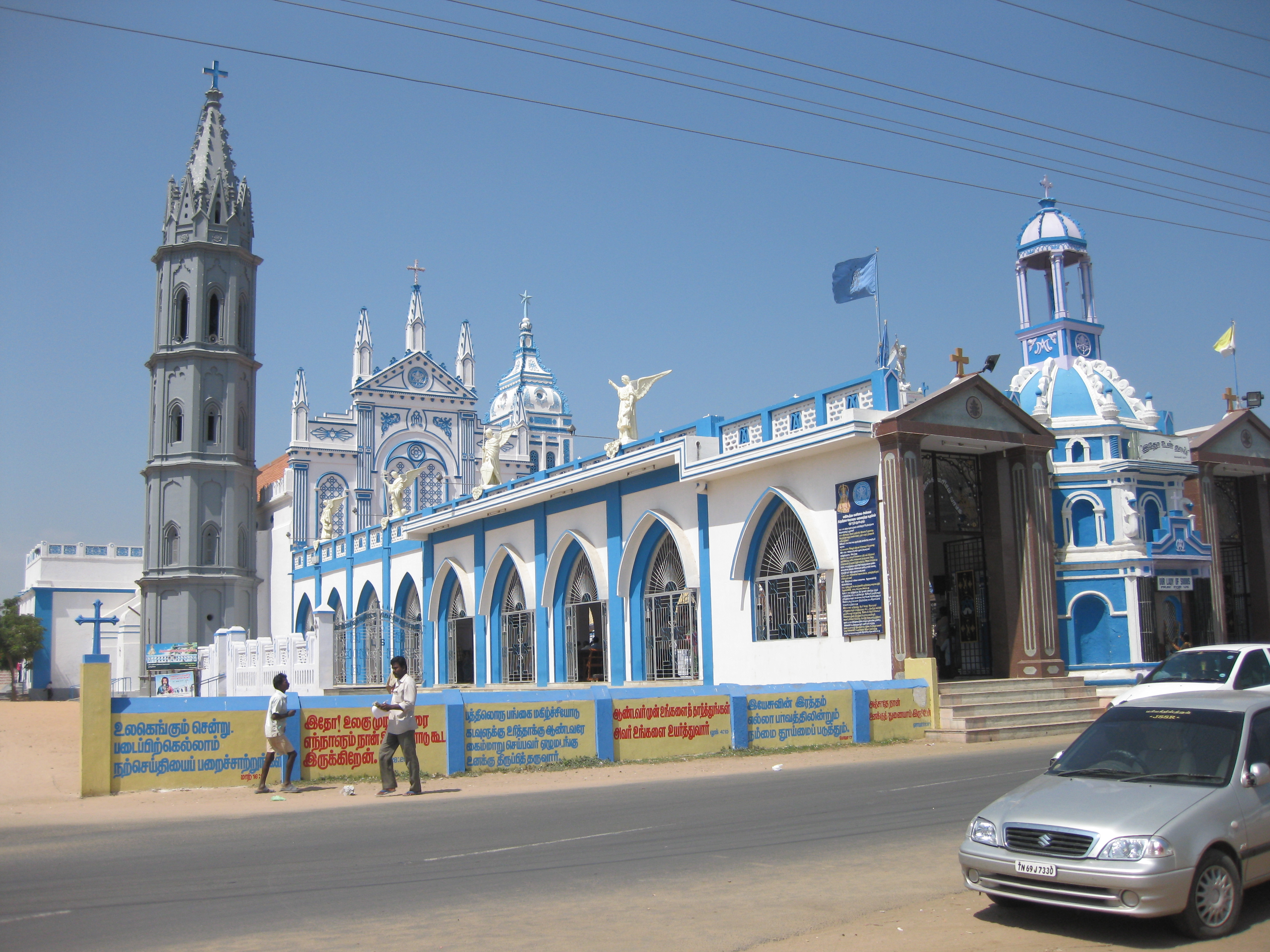
Basilica of Our Lady of Snows, Thoothukudi

Basilica of Our Lady of Snows, Thoothukudi is located at Thoothukudi, Tamil Nadu, India. It is one of the Catholic pilgrimage centers in India dedicated to the Our Lady of Snows, a title given to Mother Mary. The Shrine name refers to the Basilica di Santa Maria Maggiore in Rome. The site is known for Portuguese architecture and Portuguese prayers and now it is recognised as a Tamil Nadu notable pilgrim site.

=== St. Francis Xavier's Cathedral, Kottar ===
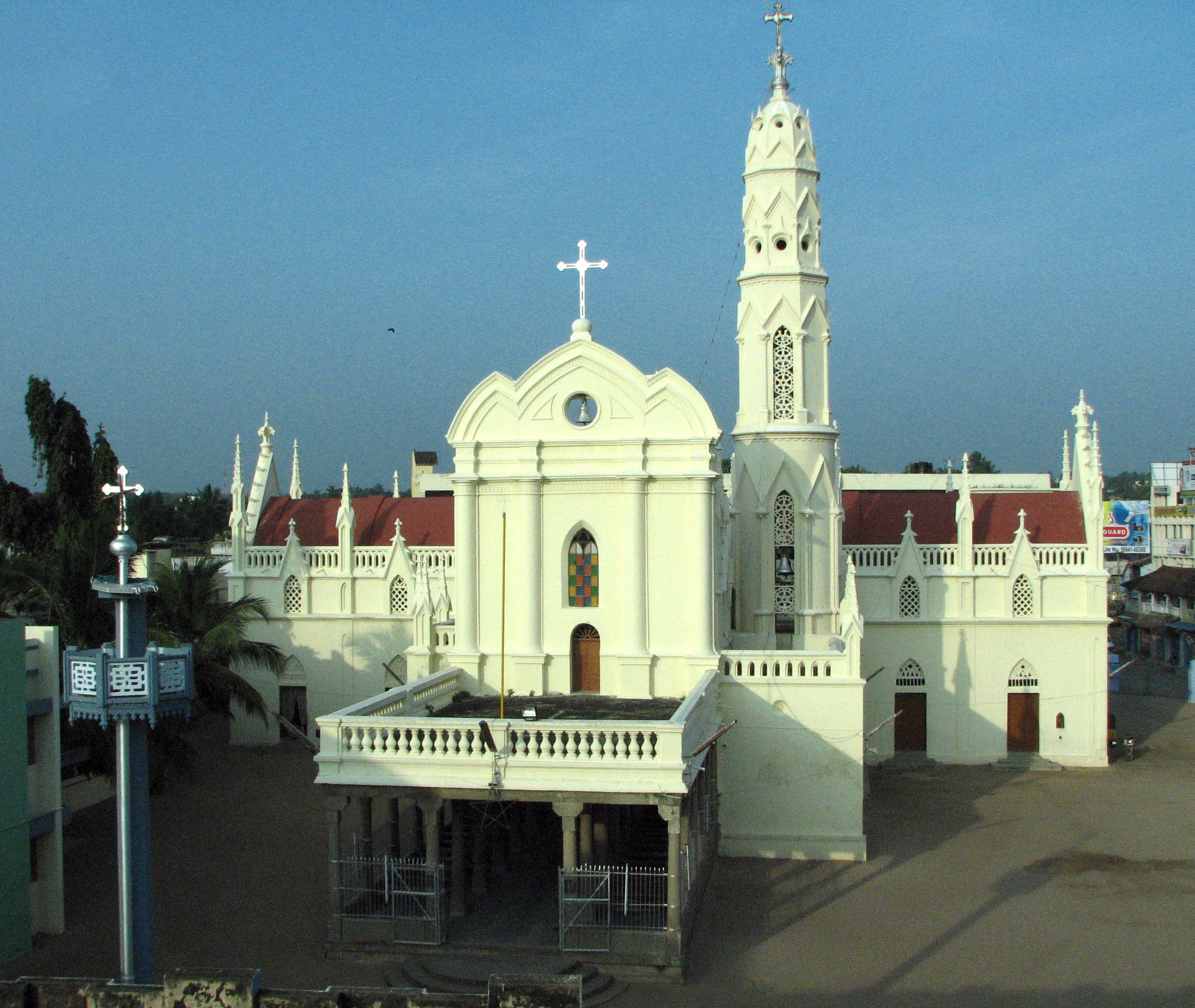
St. Xavier's Cathedral, Kottar, kanyakumari district

St. Francis Xavier's Cathedral, Kottar, is a Roman Catholic Latin Rite shrine in Kottar, Nagercoil, in the Kanyakumari district of Tamil Nadu state, India. While Francis Xavier was doing missionary work in Kottar and its neighbourhood, he averted an invasion of Vadugas with the help of the army of Paravars and Padaiyatchis of Kottar, at Vadasery, thus protecting the people of the Venad kingdom from that attack which was appreciated by the king, Unni Kerala Varma, who became closer to the priest and befriended him from then on. In recognition of Xavier's services, the king allotted him a piece of land to construct a Catholic church, as a gesture of goodwill, as per the church records. There was already a small church, in the same place where St. Xavier Church stands at present, dedicated to Mary the Mother of God, since AD 1544. Church records indicate that St. Xavier Church was built in 1600. In 1865, the Shrine of Mary was renovated and enlarged. In 1930, the church was raised to the status of a cathedral. The annual festival is celebrated during November – December, lasting for 10 days.

== Popular Church of South India (CSI) churches in Tamil Nadu ==
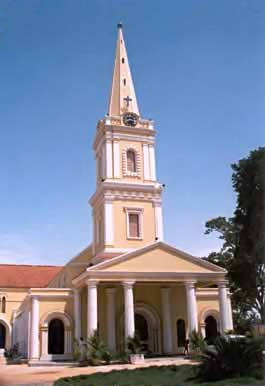
Holy Trinity Cathedral Palayamkottai,
Tirunelveli Diocese

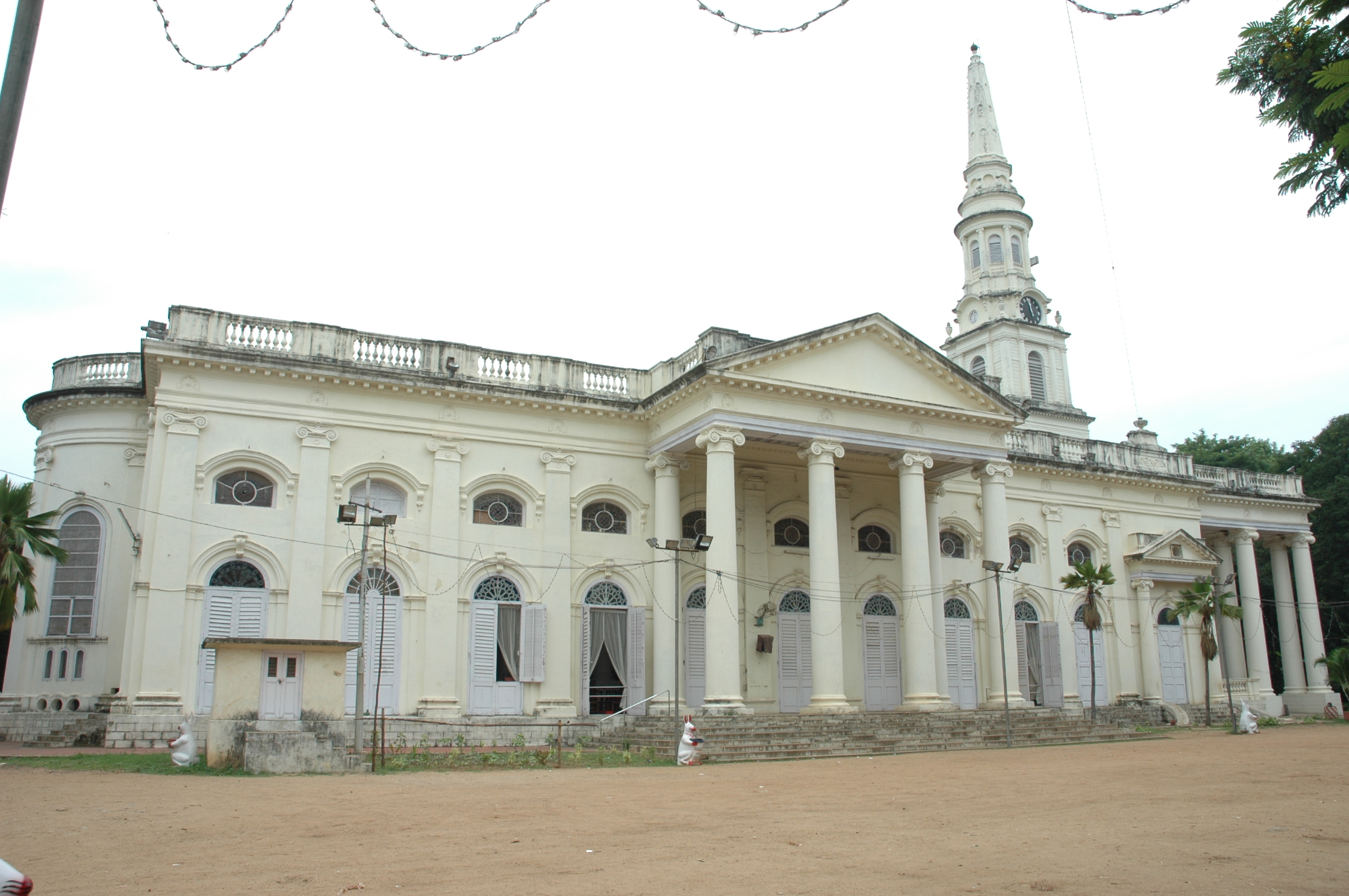
St. George's Cathedral, Chennai
Madras Diocese

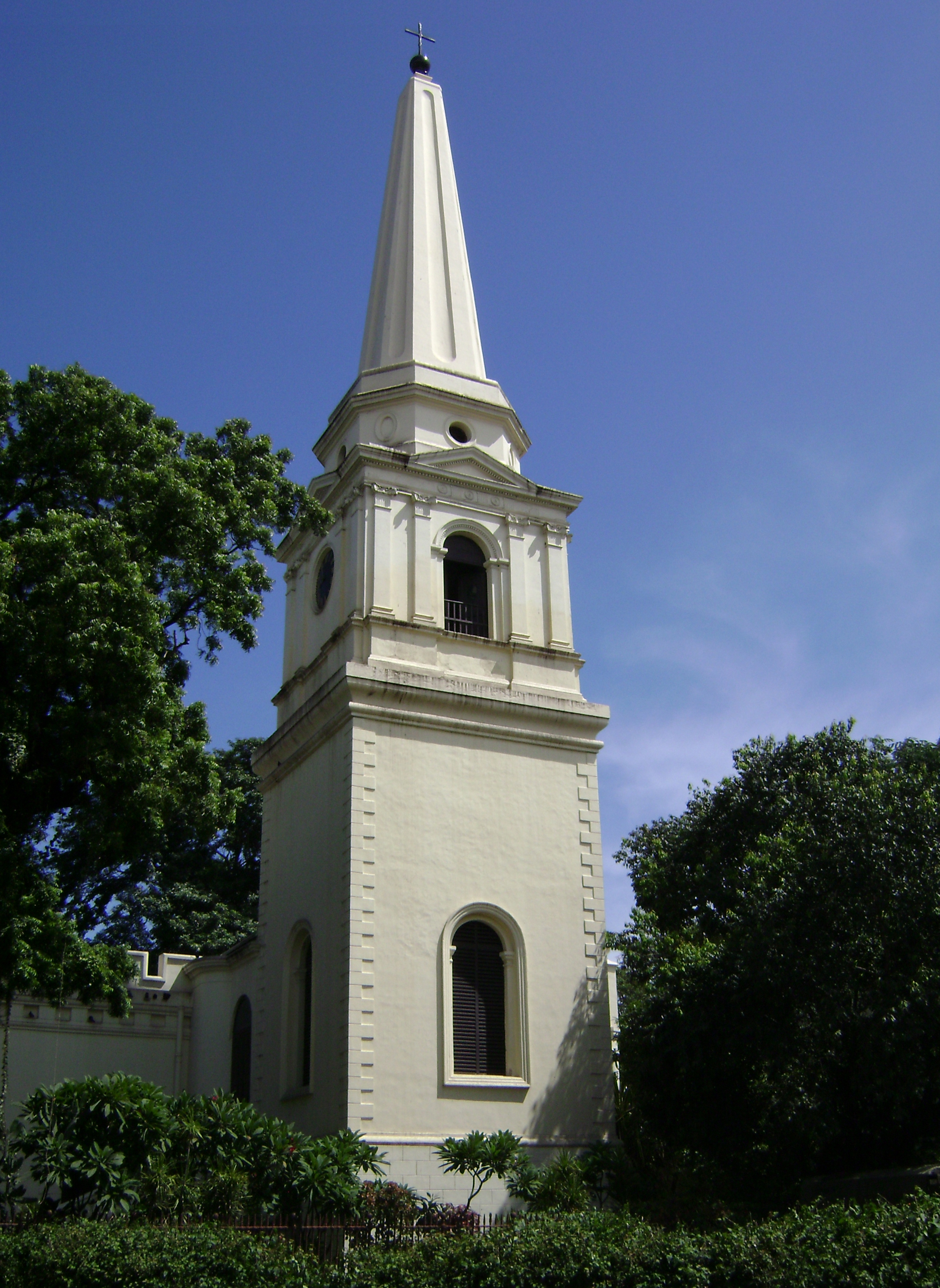
St. Mary's Church, Chennai
oldest Anglican church in India

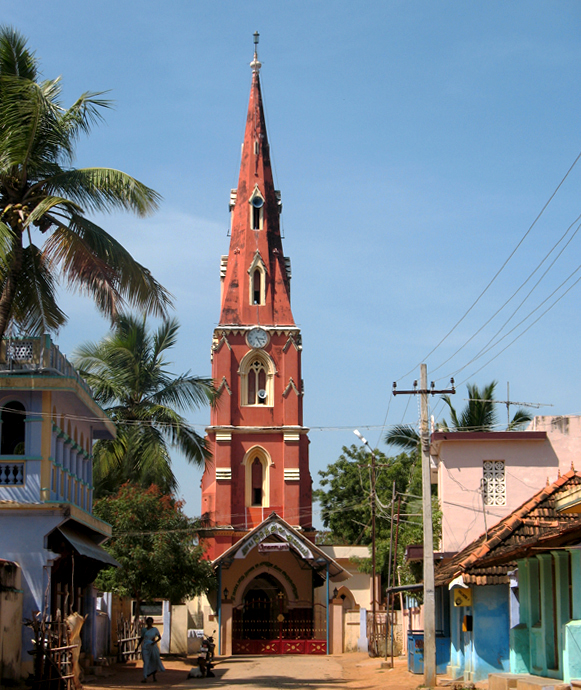
Holy Trinity C.S.I.Church in Pragasapuram, Thoothukudi - Nazareth Diocese

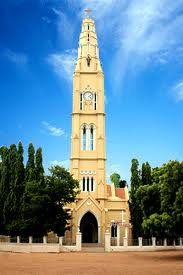
St. John's C.S.I.Cathedral, Nazareth
Thoothukudi - Nazareth Diocese

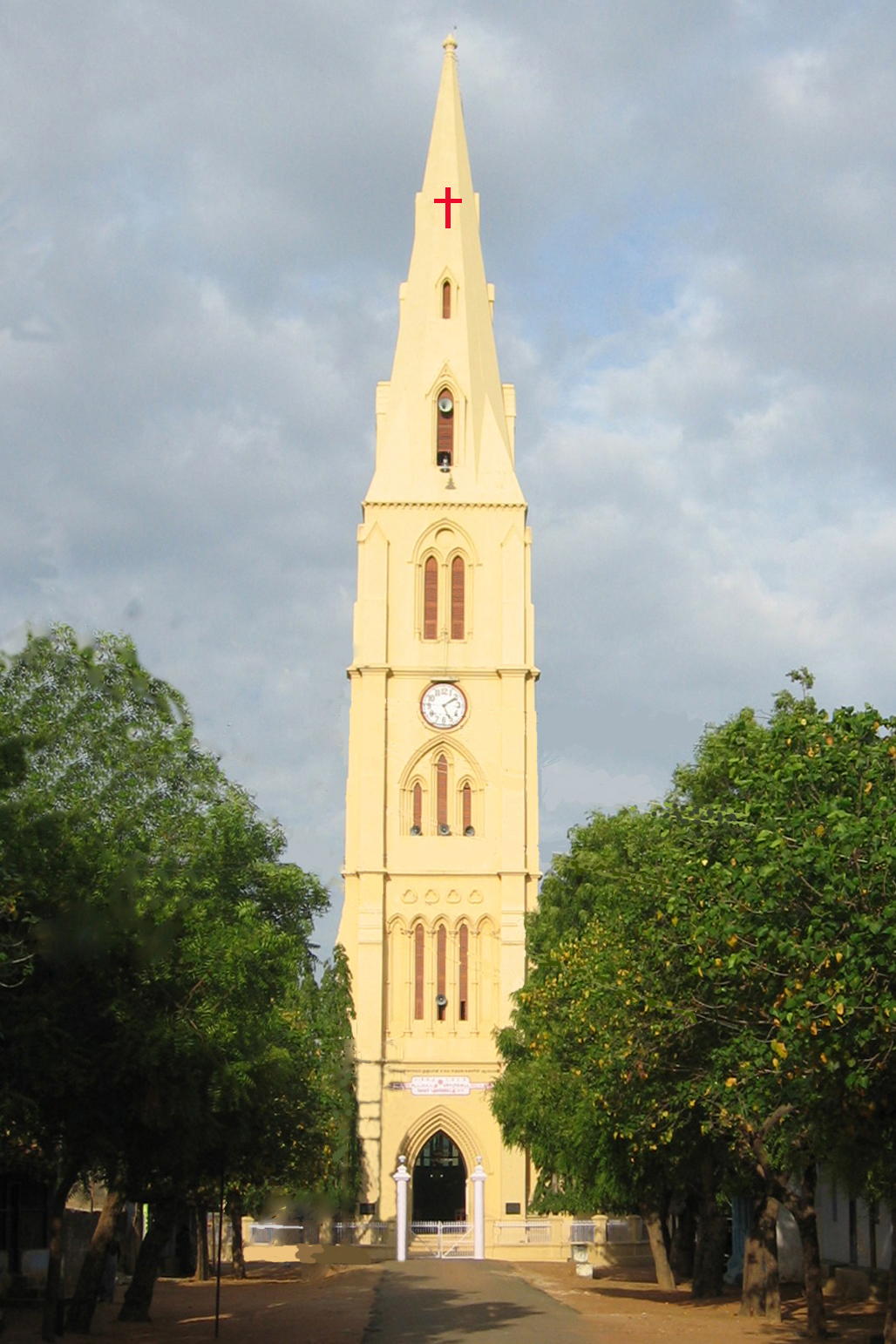
St Michael and all Angels C.S.I. Church, Mudalur
Thoothukudi - Nazareth Diocese

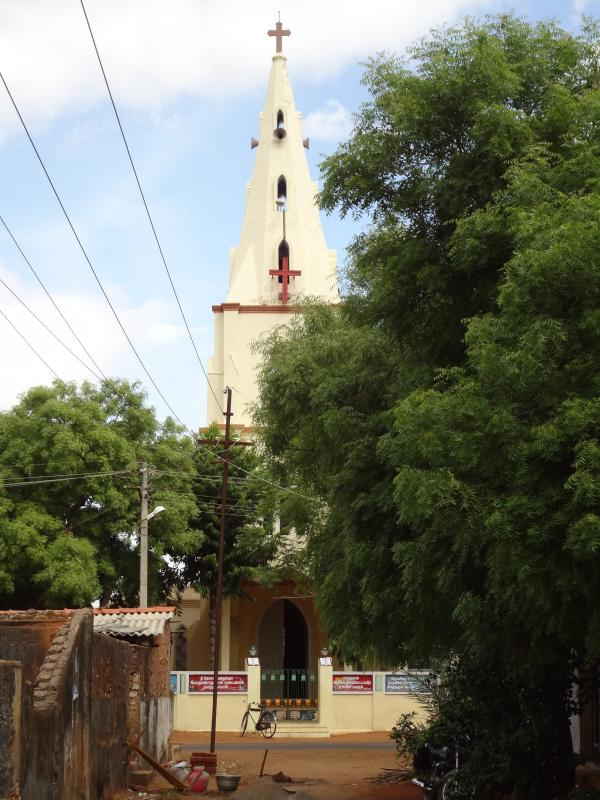
St. John's C.S.I. Church, Adayal Mudalur

St. Paul Church in Mela Ilandaikulam,
Tirunelveli Diocese

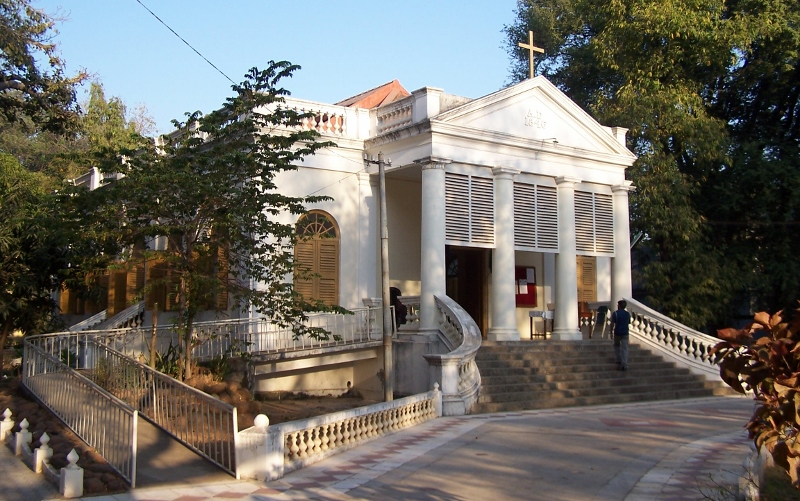
St. John's Church in Vellore Fort,
Vellore Diocese

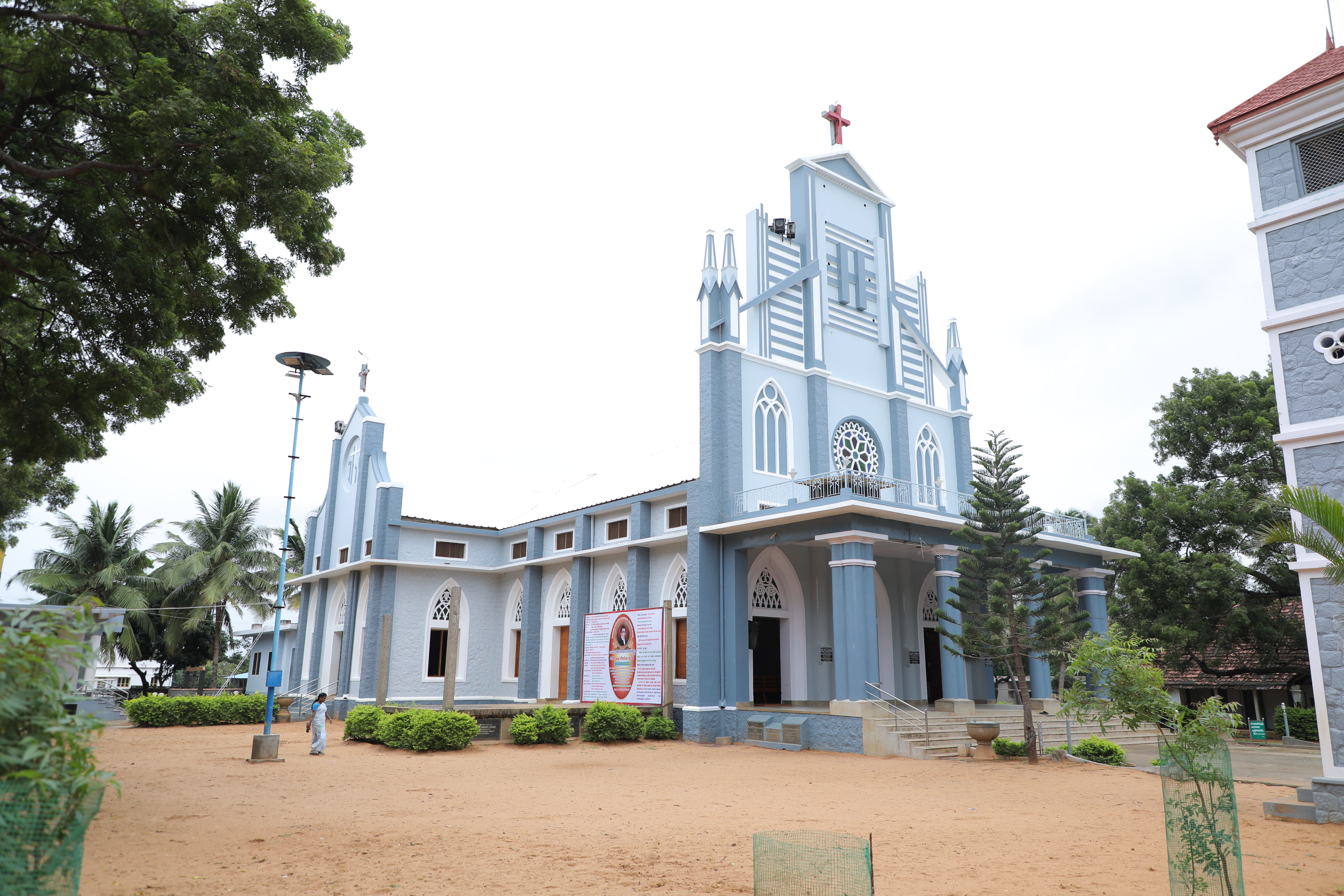
Ringeltaube Vethamonikam Memorial Church, Mylaudy, (cathedral)
Kanyakumari Diocese

== Contributions to literature ==
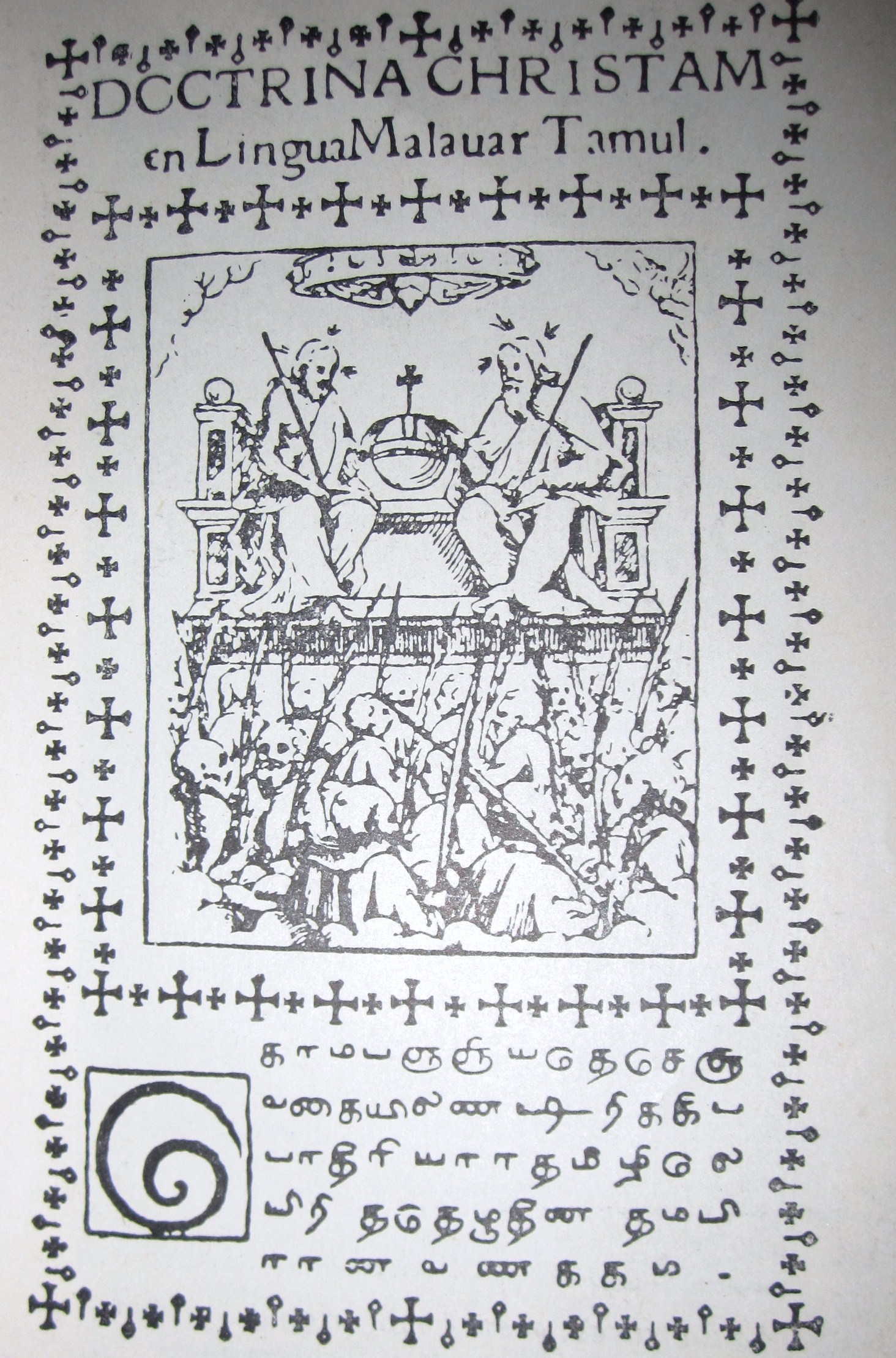
Thambiran Vanakkam first Tamil Christian book (1578)

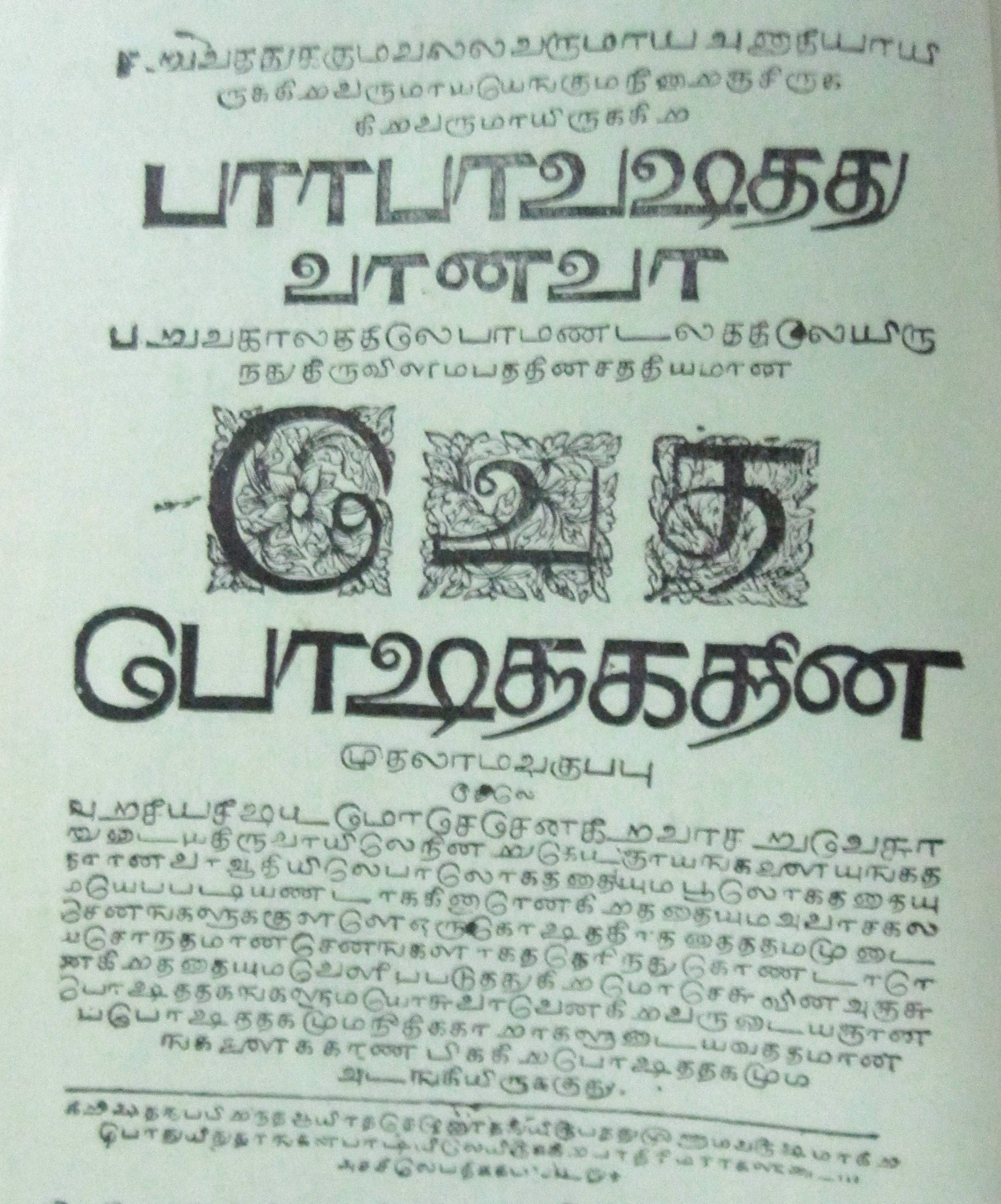
Tamil New Testament (1713)

Christians of Tamil Nadu who have made concrete contributions to Tamil language and Tamil literature are

- Vedanayagam Sastriar (1774–1864)
- Samuel Vedanayagam Pillai (1826–1889)
- Henry Alfred Krishnapillai (1827–1900)
- Dr. Abraham Pandithar (1859–1919)
- Xavier Thaninayagam (1913–1980)

Christians who had been born in Europe, but were adopted to Tamil culture and made major contributions to Tamil language and literature are

- Roberto de Nobili, also known as Thaththuva Bothagar
- Constanzo Beschi / Constantine Joseph Beschi, also known as Veeramaa Munivar
- Bartholomaeus Ziegenbalg
- Robert Caldwell
- George Uglow Pope
- Fred Goodwill

== Christian pilgrimages ==
- St. Thomas Cathedral Basilica, Chennai
- Basilica of Our Lady of Good Health, Velankanni
- St. Thomas Mount in Chennai
- Poondi Madha Basilica
- Our Lady of Snows Basilica, Thoothukudi
- St. Antony's Church at Uvari
- St. Francis Xavier's Cathedral, Kottar
- Our Lady of Ransom Church, Kanyakumari.
- Church of Maria Bambina Kangeyam.
- St. Mary's Orthodox Church, Thiruvithamcode, Kanyakumari
- New Jerusalem Church, Tranquebar
- St. John de Britto Church, Oriyur, Sivagangai
- Amy Carmichael, Dohnavur Fellowship Mission
- Our lady of Holy Rosary basilica Karumathampatti, Coimbatore

== List of denominations ==
- Catholic Church
- Church of North India (CNI) (North India)
- Church of South India (CSI) (Tamil Nadu, Kerala, Karnataka, Andhra Pradesh, Telangana, Sri Lanka,...)
- Apostolic Christian Assembly
- Assemblies of God
- Advent Christian Church
- Anglican Church of India
- Arise and Shine Missionary Diocese
- Arcot Lutheran Church (ALC)
- Brethren Church
- Bible Believing Churches in India
- Bible Crusade Missionary Society
- Church of Christ (Non-Instrumental)
- Tamil Evangelical Lutheran Church (TELC)
- Dohnavur Fellowship
- Eternal Light Ministries
- Evangelical Christian Church of India
- Fort English Church by Rev. Dr. I. Ratnampaul (Tirunelveli)
- Good News Church (Ramanathapuram)
- India Gospel League
- Indian National Apostolic Diocese
- Indian Pentecostal Church (ipc)
- Saron Bethel Deva Sabai Kanyakumari District
- Madras Pentecostal Assembly Church
- Maranatha Full Gospel Churches
- Prince of Peace Church
- Tamil Baptist Churches
- The Pentecostal Mission
- Good Shepherd mission church
- The Church of Jesus Christ of Latter-day Saints
- Rehobtoh Church, Sankarankovil
- Madras Pentecostal Faith Church, Mylapore
- Evangelical Church of India
- Church of Mahanaim Ministries
- The Salvation Army Church
- Indian Pentecostal church (ipc)
- Christian Revival Church (CRC)
- Syrian Malankara catholic & Marthoama kanyakumari dist borders of Kerala
- Malankara Orthodox Church

== List of Tamil Christians ==
- C. Joseph Vijay (Chief Minister of Tamil Nadu)
- Madhuri Devi
- Vikram (actor)
- S.J. Suryah
- J. C. D. Prabhakar
- N. Marie Wilson
- Sathish Christopher
- Harris Jayaraj
- D. Imman
- Vijay Antony
- J. Livingston
- Prameela
- James Vasanthan
- John Vijay
- Alexander Babu
- L. R. Eswari
- Chandrababu
- Vedanayagam Sastriar
- Samuel Vedanayagam Pillai
- Vincent Asokan
- Henry Alfred Krishnapillai
- Dr.Abraham Pandithar
- S.A. Ashokan
- Xavier Thaninayagam
- Arun Alexander
- Mahendran
- Nelson Dilipkumar
- George Maryan
- Imman Annachi
- Joseph John (minister)
- Andrea Jeremiah
- Nivedita Louis
- S. A. Chandrasekhar

== See also ==
- List of Indian Christians
- List of cathedrals in India
- List of Roman Catholic missionaries in India
- Christianity in Goa
- Christianity in West Bengal
- Christianity in Kerala
- Christianity in Maharashtra
- Christian Revival Church

== Sources ==
- Fahlbusch, Erwin; Bromiley, Geoffrey William; Lochman, Jan Milic; Mbiti, John; Pelikan, Jaroslav (2008). The Encyclodedia of Christianity. Vol. 5. Wm. B. Eerdmans. ISBN 978-0-8028-2417-2.
- Medlycott, Adolphus E. (1905). India and the Apostle Thomas: An Inquiry, with a Critical Analysis of the Acta Thomae. London: David Nutt.
- Puthiakunnel, Thomas (1973). "Jewish colonies of India paved the way for St. Thomas". In Menachery, George (ed.). The St. Thomas Christian Encyclopaedia of India. Vol. 2. Trichur. OCLC 1237836.
- Slapak, Orpa, ed. (1995). The Jews of India: A Story of Three Communities. Muzeon Yisrael. ISBN 978-965-278-179-6 – via University Press of New England.
