= Our Lady of Ransom Church =

Our Lady of Ransom Church may refer to:

- Basilica of Our Lady of Ransom or Vallarpadam Church, Vallarpadam-Ernakulam, Kochi, India
- Our Lady of Ransom Church, Kanyakumari, Tamil Nadu, India
- Our Lady of Ransom Church, Eastbourne, East Sussex, United Kingdom

== See also ==
- Feast of Our Lady of Ransom
