= Henry Alfred Krishnapillai =

Indian poet (1827–1900)

- Born: 23 April 1827; Karaiyiruppu (or) Reddiarpatti, Tinnevely District, Madras Presidency, British India (now Tirunelveli district, Tamil Nadu, India)
- Died: 3 February 1900 (aged 72); Tinnevely District, Madras Presidency, British India (now Tirunelveli district, Tamil Nadu, India)
- Occupations: Tamil teacher, writer
- Writing career
- Subject: Christianity
- Notable work: Rakshanya Yatrikam (published - 1894)

Henry Alfred Krishnapillai (1827–1900) was a well-known poet in Tamil language. He was born in a Hindu family, but later converted to Christianity. He was an accomplished Tamil teacher and hence after his conversion sought to work on Tamil literary works. After his retirement he worked on his magnum opus, Ratchanya Yaatrigam. This work was based on John Bunyan's Pilgrim's Progress, although not a translation. The work itself took 16 years to complete and is one of finest works of Tamil literature of the nineteenth century.

Krishnapillai is well known to use analogies from Hindu text in his Christian writings. His Christian hymns are still popular among Tamil Protestants. These hymns are similar in style to Hindu text Tevaram.

== Early life ==
Krishna Pillai was born in 1827 at Karaiyiruppu, Tirunelveli District, Tamil Nadu. He was born into an orthodox Hindu family belonging to Vaishnava tradition of Hinduism. He received his early education in Tamil grammar and literature in the village.

== Conversion to Christianity ==
In May 1853, he moved to Sawyerpuram, a Christian hamlet. The settlement was founded by the Society for Propagation of the Gospel. There Krishnapillai was appointed as a Tamil teacher by Bishop Robert Caldwell. It was in Sawyerpuram that he first encountered Christianity through his friends and eventually was baptised an Anglican in the St Thomas Church in Mylapore, Chennai. He was christened Henry Alfred through his baptism but he still retained his Hindu name Krishna Pillai. Later in 1875, he was appointed as a Tamil pundit at Church Missionary Society (CMS) college at Tirunelveli.

== Tamil Christian literature ==
After his retirement, Krishnapillai aspired to write Tamil Christian classics along the lines of Hindu epics. Hence, he spent the 16 years writing the book Rakshanya Yatrikam (the journey of salvation, 1894). This work was modeled after John Bunyan's Pilgrim's Progress. Nevertheless, it was not a translation but an adaptation of the story in Tamil. This work is considered as his masterpiece. He had read the Pilgrim's Progress even before his conversion and had planned to retell the story in Tamil verses. However, he started working on it only in 1878 to appear serially in Friendly Instructor. He fell ill with malaria in 1879, and then, with encouragement from his friends, Krishnapillai decided to compile the work in an epic form similar to the Tamil Ramayana. After 16 years, it was sent to print in 1894 and is considered one of the most significant Tamil poetry works of the nineteenth century.

In addition to this masterpiece, Krishnapillai wrote several other books in Tamil on Christianity. Although he was a converted Christian, he used many analogies from Hindu text in his work. He is sometimes referred to as Christian Kamban. Some of the hymns he composed are still prevalent amongst Tamil Protestants. His hymns were based on Hindu texts such as Tevaram.

== Death ==
He died on 3 February 1900, aged 72.

== See also ==
- Christianity in India
- Church of South India
