= Our Lady of Ransom Church, Kanyakumari =

Our Lady of Ransom Church
- Our Lady of Ransom Shrine
- தூய அலங்கார உபகார மாதா திருத்தலம்
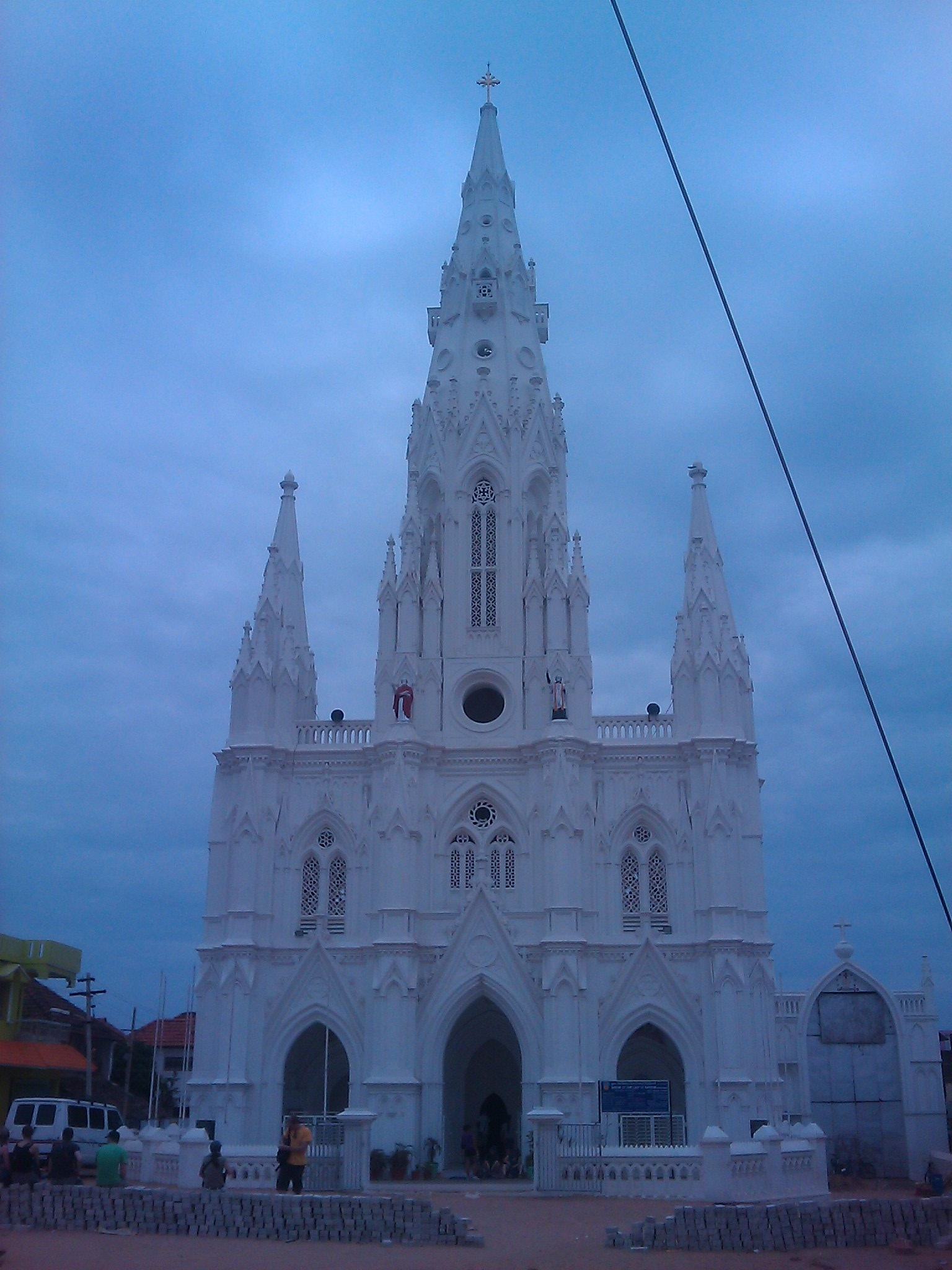
- Our Lady of Ransom Church
- 8.085558°N 77.552356°E
- Location: Kanyakumari - 629702
- Country: India
- Denomination: Catholic Church
- Website: http://www.ransomchurchkanyakumari.org/

History
- Founded: 1915; 111 years ago

Architecture
- Architect: Pakiam Pillai
- Style: Gothic Revival

Clergy
- Priest: Nazrain

Our Lady of Ransom Church is a Catholic church located at Kanyakumari, Tamil Nadu, India.

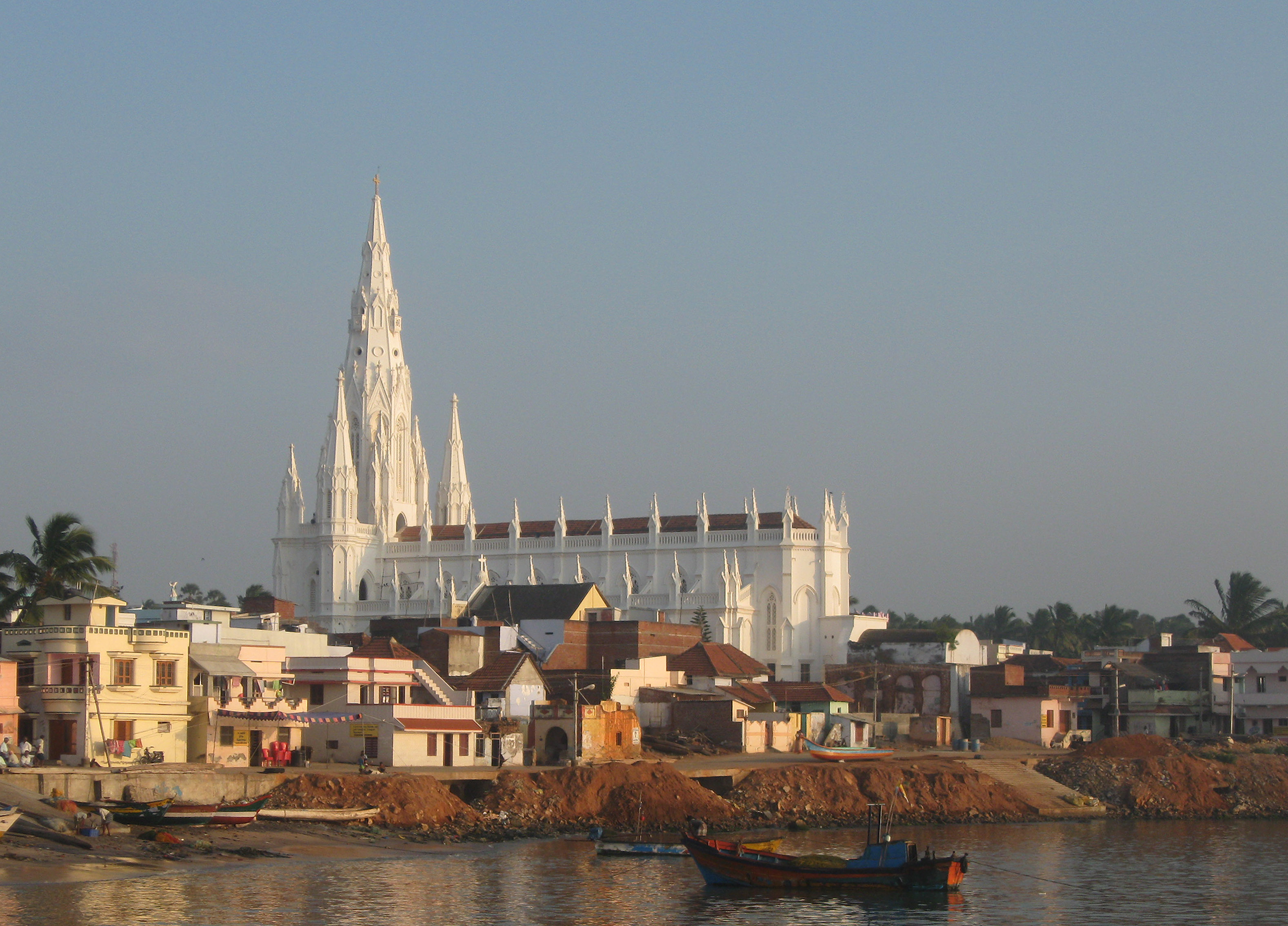
Our Lady of Ransom Church view from the beach

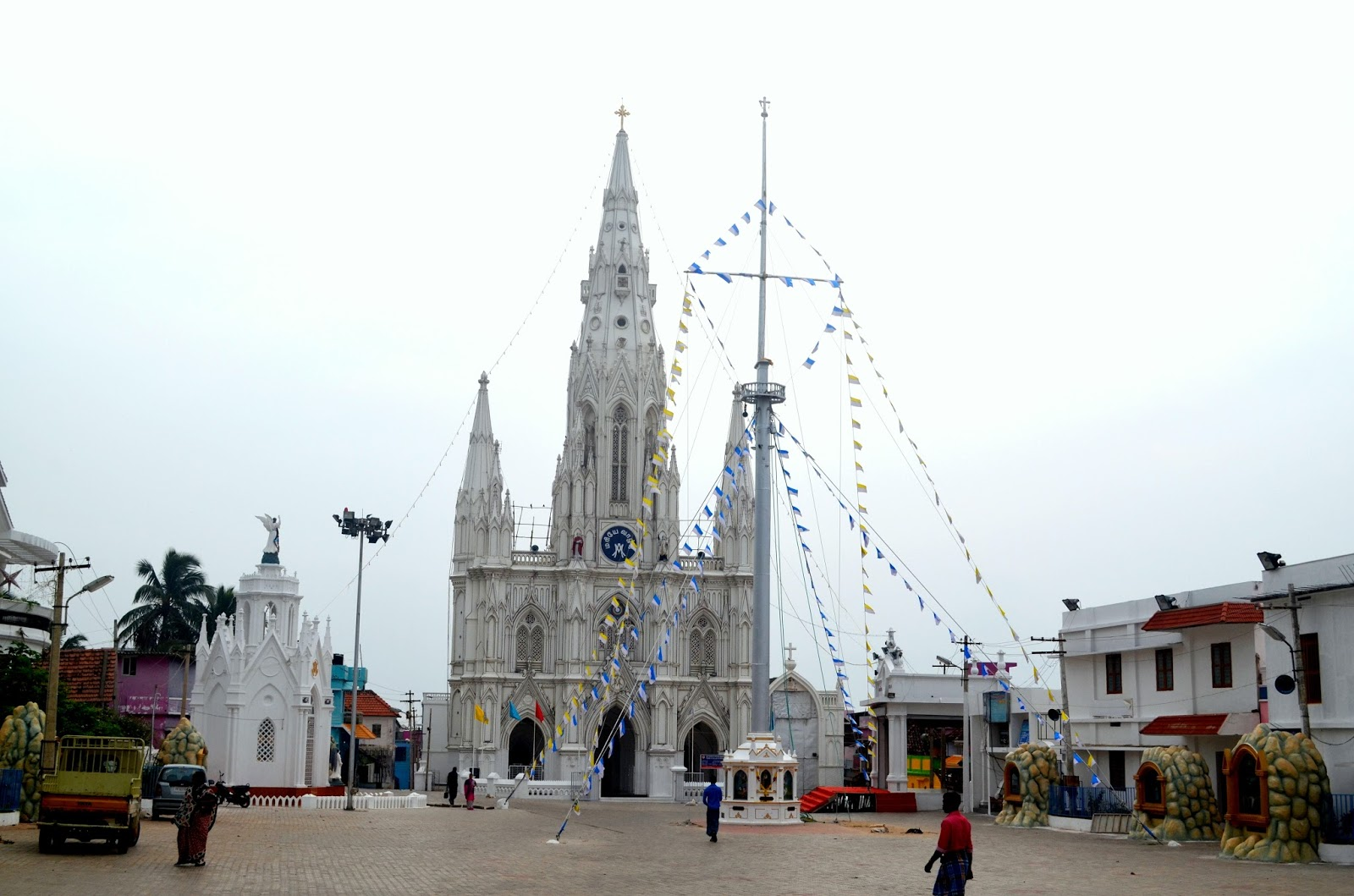
Flag Mast

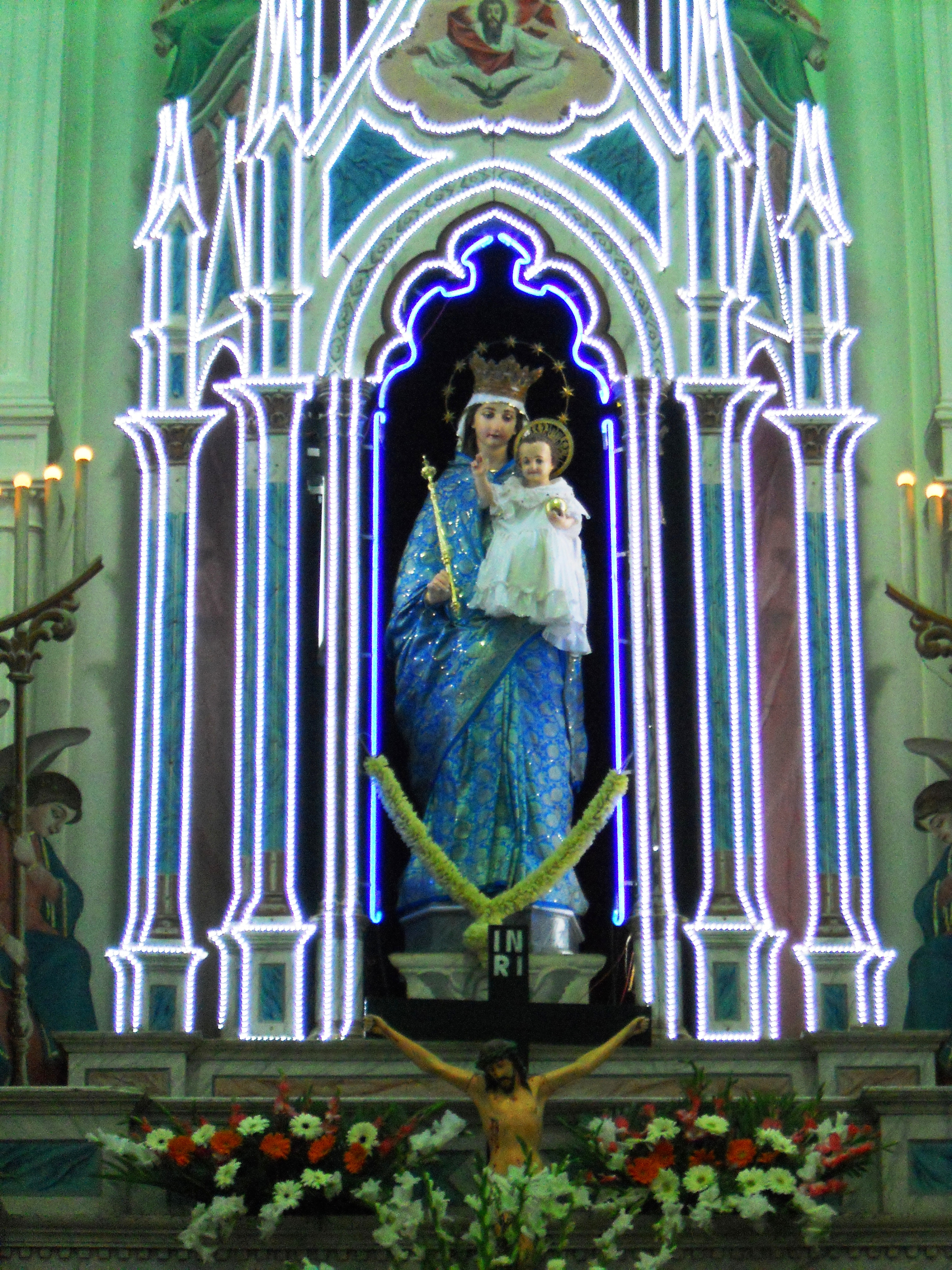
Ransom Mary in Indian Tradition

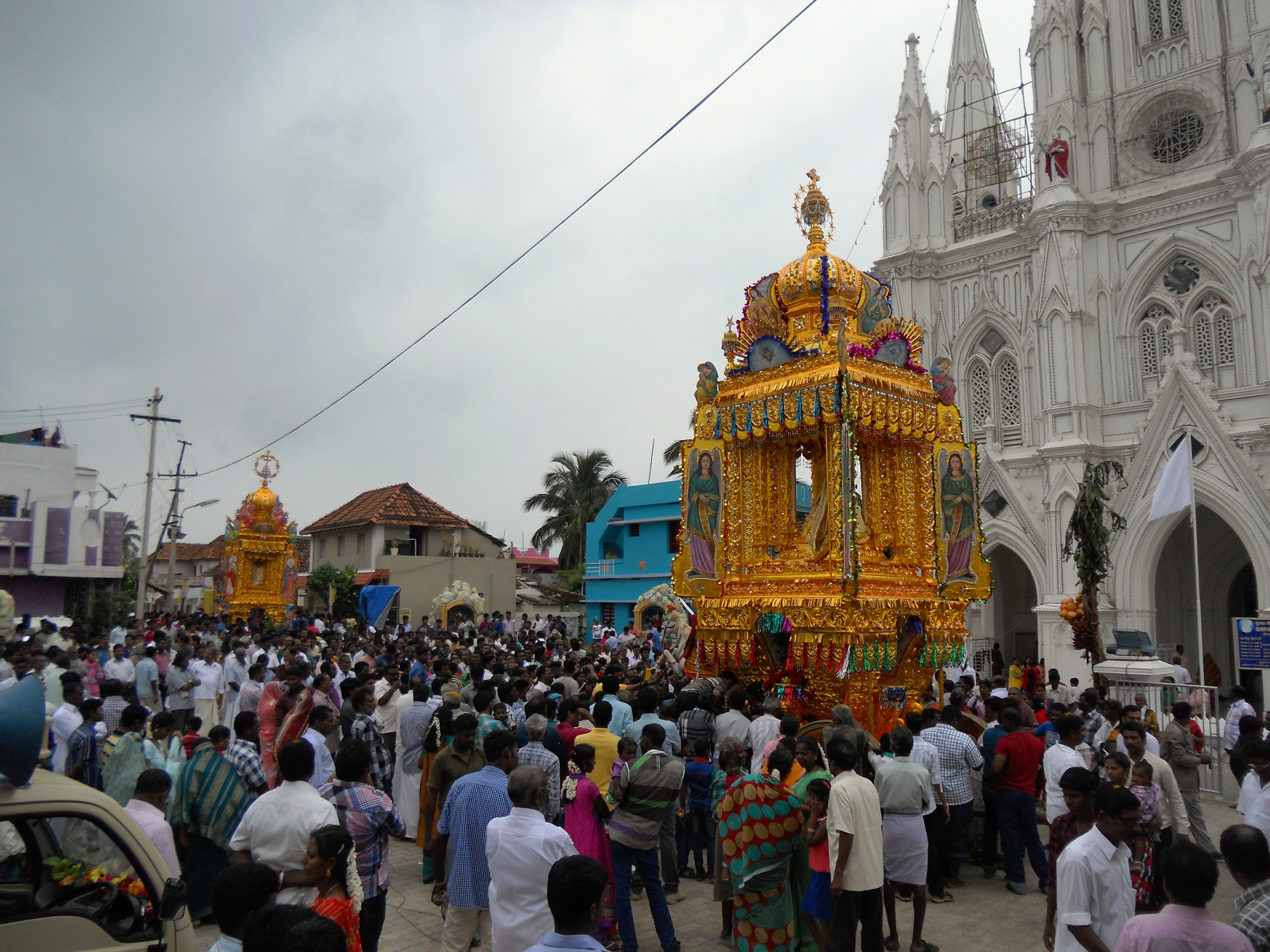
Two golden cars

== Location ==
It is situated in the District of Kanyakumari in the southernmost part of the Indian subcontinent (also referred as The Lands End). The Kanyakumari Parish almost coincides with the civil village of Kanyakumari. It is closely associated with the mainstream Catholic faith in India. According to the census in 2011, the Kanyakumari district comprises 48.74% of Christians in Tamil Nadu.

== History ==
Tombstones unearthed at Kumari Muttom, near Kanyakumari, contain evidence to show that Catholics have been living there for many centuries. The tombstones, dated 1496, contain the edict of the local ruler granting tax exemptions to the residents of Kumari Muttom and authorizing a levy from the fishermen there. The aggregate income thus generated had to be used to keep the lights of the church burning.

In 1542 when St. Francis Xavier came to Cape Comerin (Kanyakumari) he found 'Our Lady of Delights Grotto' there. It then became a centre for mission activities of the Jesuits from Thoothoor to Ramanathapuram.

It is believed that Our Lady of Delights Grotto later became the church of Our Lady of Ransom. Our Lady of Ransom is the Patron of the congregation in Spain which redeemed the Christians from the Muslim invasion in the year 1218. The people of Kanyakumari combined the name Ransom with Delight and call their patron Alangara Upakara Matha.

== Old church of 18th century ==
A small thatched church was upgraded in 1700 when a big church of Roman architecture was constructed. A statue of Mother Mary was created in the 16th century derived in Rome. The statue, clad with a sari, was placed in the centre of a golden altar and venerated by the name of Alangara matha. Statues of St. Joseph and St. Francis Xavier were placed in the right side and left side respectively. There are also wooden carvings depicting the coronation of Mary as queen of heaven and earth. Other carvings depict angels playing musical instruments (including a violin, flute and drums) on the altar, as well as Jesus Christ inviting his disciples for ministries and forgiving Mary Magdalene, the twelve disciples, a lamb lying on a Bible, Cardinals, a Pope, and soldiers holding foliage in their hands.

== History of the flagstaff ==
In 1917, a foreign (German) merchant ship carrying coal was grounded on the sandy shore of Leepuram, Kanyakumari, and could not be refloated; it was abandoned and sold at auction to Kayathan Villavarayan, a merchant from Tuticorin. He donated the iron mast to Our Lady of Ransom Church, Kanyakumari. The kattumarams of Kanyakumari were brought to Leepuram to take the mast to Kanyakumari.

When the mast was loaded on the kattumarams, the mast and the kattumarams sank; they then began to float. The mast was taken to Kanyakumari by road and was fitted into a bore hole in a stone and fixed in place with molten lead.

== New church ==
The foundation for the new church was laid out by Fr. John Consolvez on 31 May 1900. The architect was Pakiam Pillai of the Vadakkankulam who modeled the church in the style of Gothic architecture. The length of the new church is 153 feet (47 m), breadth 53 feet (16 m); the height of the main tower is also 153 feet (47 m). Together, these dimensions depict the Holy Rosary, the numbers 153 and 53 representing the prayers said, as enumerated by the beads of the rosary. There are twelve towers in the church which represent the twelve disciples of Jesus.

=== Architectural elements ===
The porch ends with a pointed arch. The church has seven doors in total: three in the porch; two facing north; two facing south. The doors depict the seven gifts of the Holy Spirit.

Several clustered Gothic piers provide support to the main tower. Inside the church, there are compound pillars which resemble vertical shafts that provide support to the ceiling which is made with nave vault and transverse arches.

Two side towers attached with the main tower act as belfry containing the church bells which have been imported from Italy in 1900 AD. The bell was used for several decades to signal time.

Gigantic statues of Saint Thomas the Apostle and St. Francis Xavier are placed on the main tower. The veneration of Mother Mary is celebrated every year from 1–31 May.

== Developments ==
The church has had several parish priests.

- In 1914 Msgr. Vincent Fdo celebrated the First Mass in the newly built Church.
- In 1988, the House of Brothers of Theresa was opened.
- In 2000, the Convent of Sister of St. Anne was opened.
- In 2023, the current bishop is the Most Rev Nazrane Susai.

== Annual Feast and Golden car procession ==
Every year the feast of Our Lady of Ransom is celebrated for 10 days in the month of December. The feast of Our Lady of Ransom begins with the flag hoisting on the following Friday immediately after the feast of St. Francis Xavier, Kottar which falls on 3 December. The first day of the feast begins with the flag hoisting. During the festival, every morning festival mass is celebrated and in the evening there will be benediction with special prayers and preaching. On the eight day evening Corpus Christi Procession is held. The ninth day evening has special vespers and celebrations held.

The culmination of the feast is the golden chariot procession: two golden chariots are taken on the 9th and 10th days of the feasts. Our Lady of Delight is taken in procession in the 1st chariot, which was made in 1798. St. Joseph, the spouse of Mary, is taken in procession in the 2nd chariot, which was made in 1833. During the golden chariot procession, the traditional Nathaswaram music and peculiar praising of Mother Mary by an art of pala padal can be heard and seen. Pilgrims from different parts of the country visit the church during the annual feast.

== Current activities ==
The church has founded a primary school, high school, technical training school and hospital, as well as other facilities.

At present Kanyakumari parish has 2,850 Catholic families, which are organised into 88 Basic Christian Communities. The total number of the Catholics amounts to 12,839. There are 21 pious associations. The parish established an elementary school in the year 1882 and now 540 children are studying in the vernacular language. The parish has a Higher Secondary School established in the year 1921, where 1350 students are studying.

== See also ==
- Catholic Church in India
- Christianity in India
- Christianity in Tamil Nadu
- Fruit of the Holy Spirit
- Saint Thomas Christians

== Gallery ==
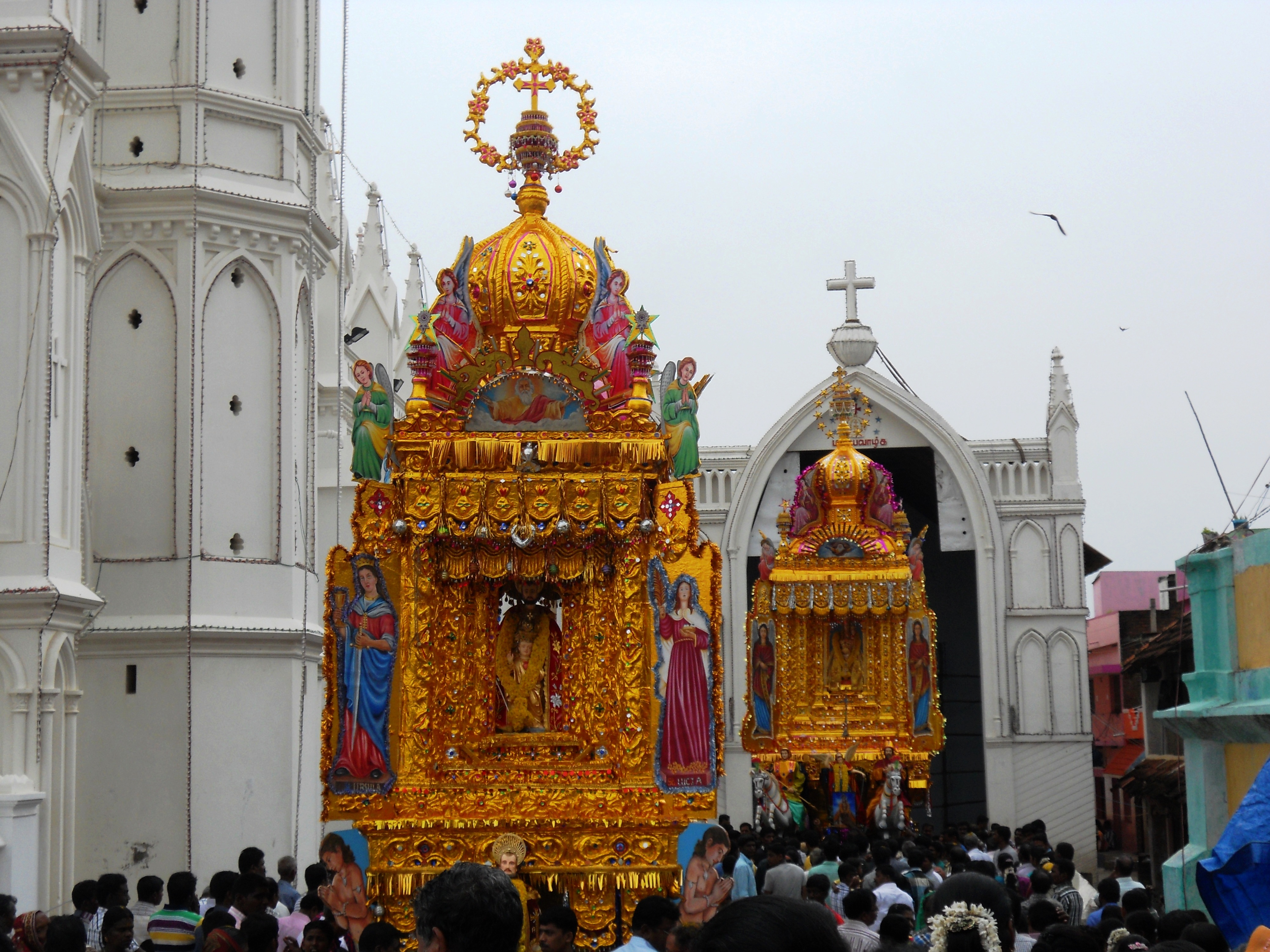
Two Golden cars procession

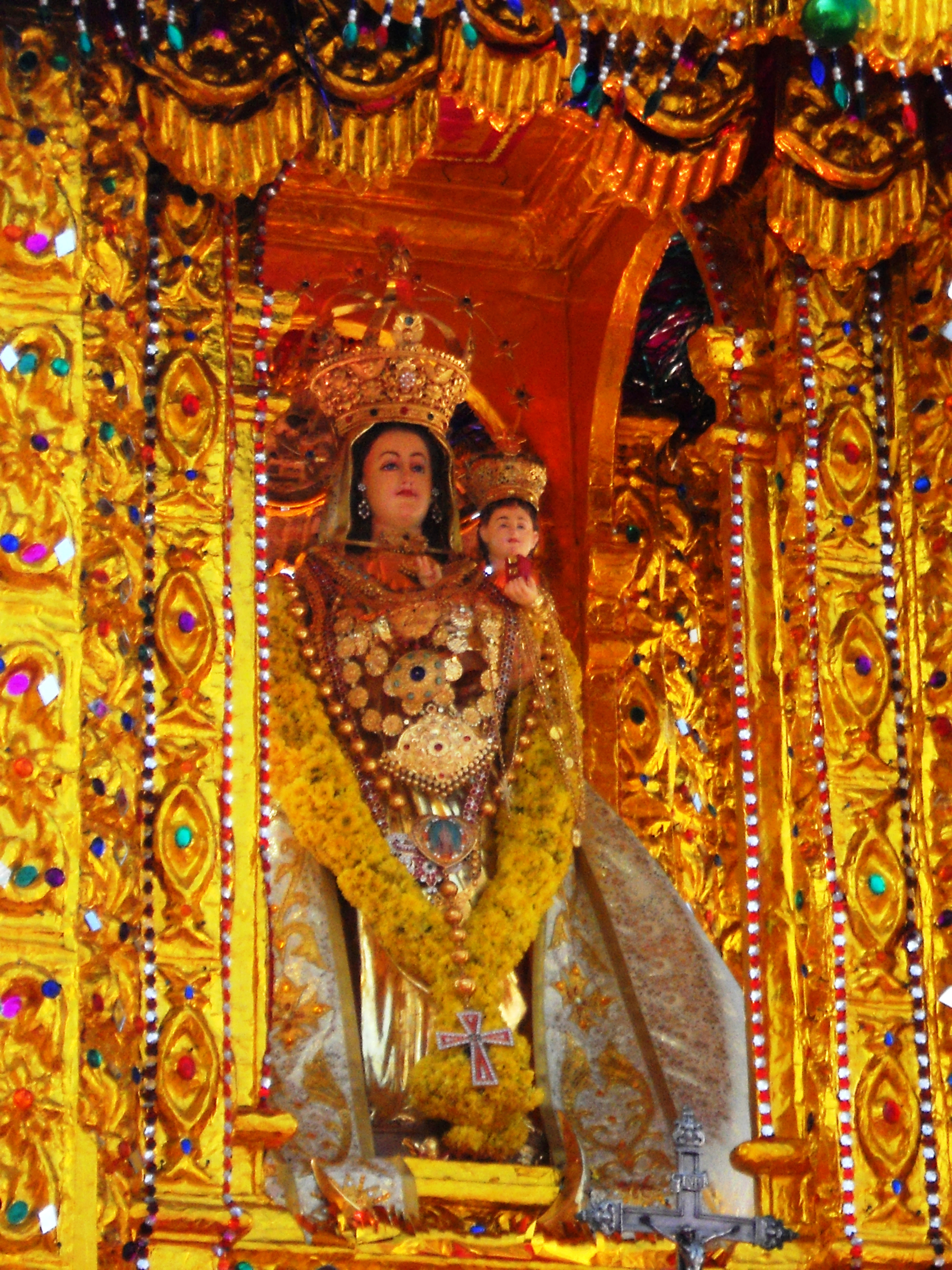
Our lady of Ransom view from the Golden car procession

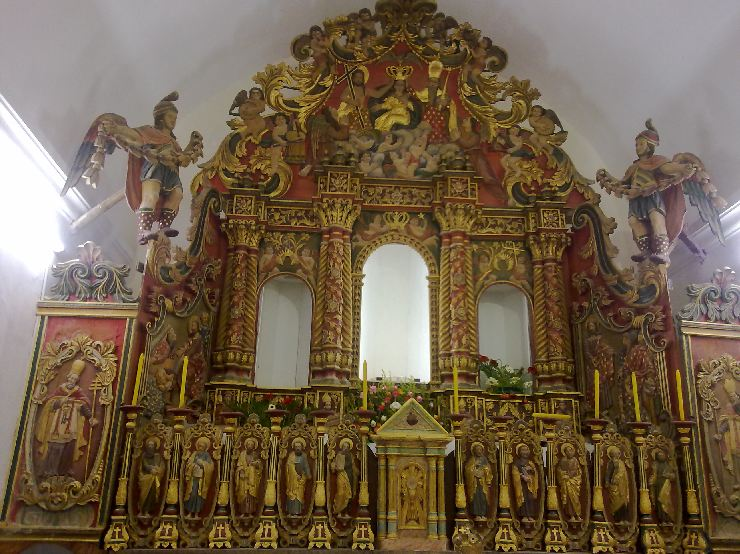
Golden altar of old church

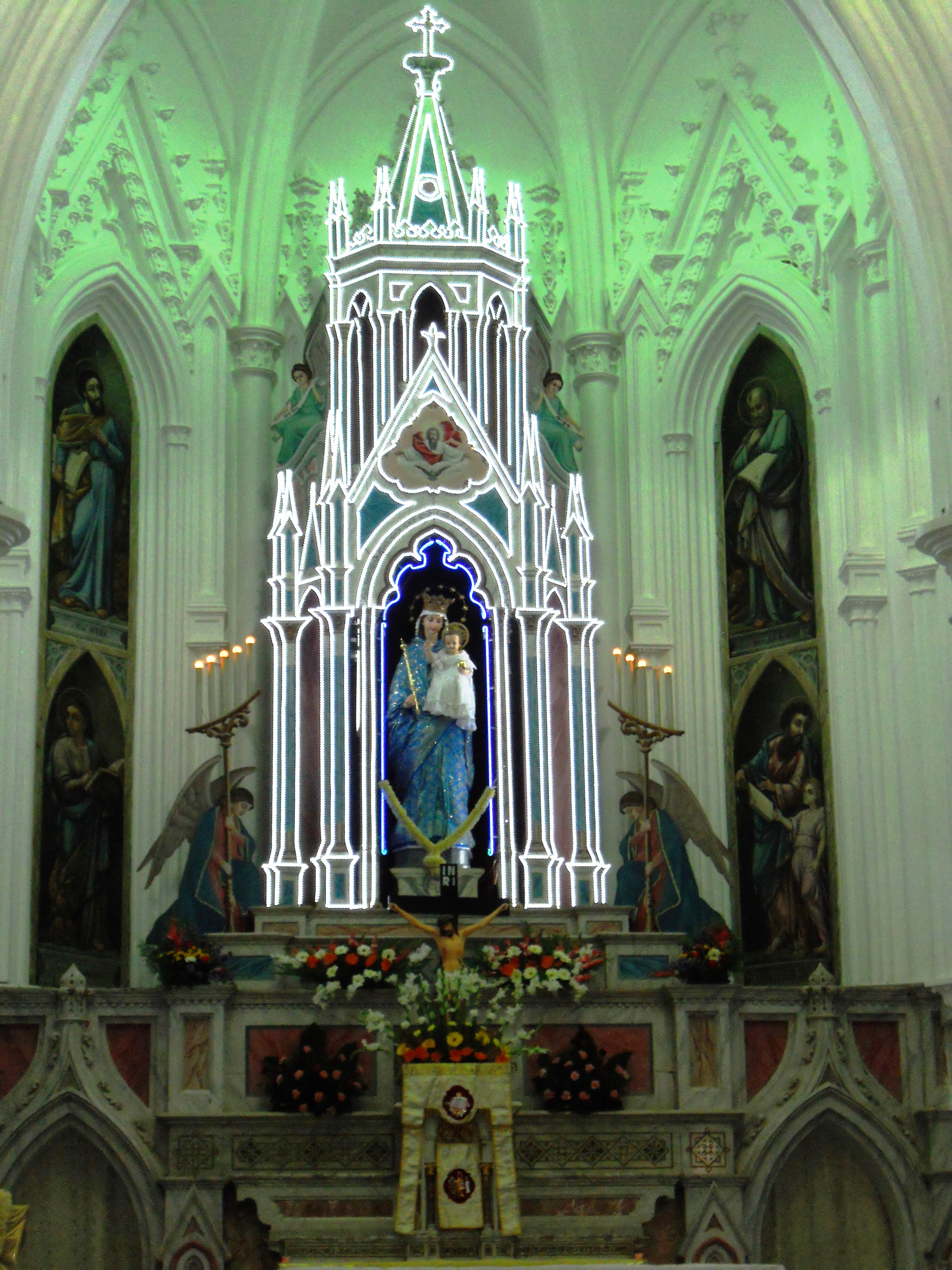
4 disciples in the altar

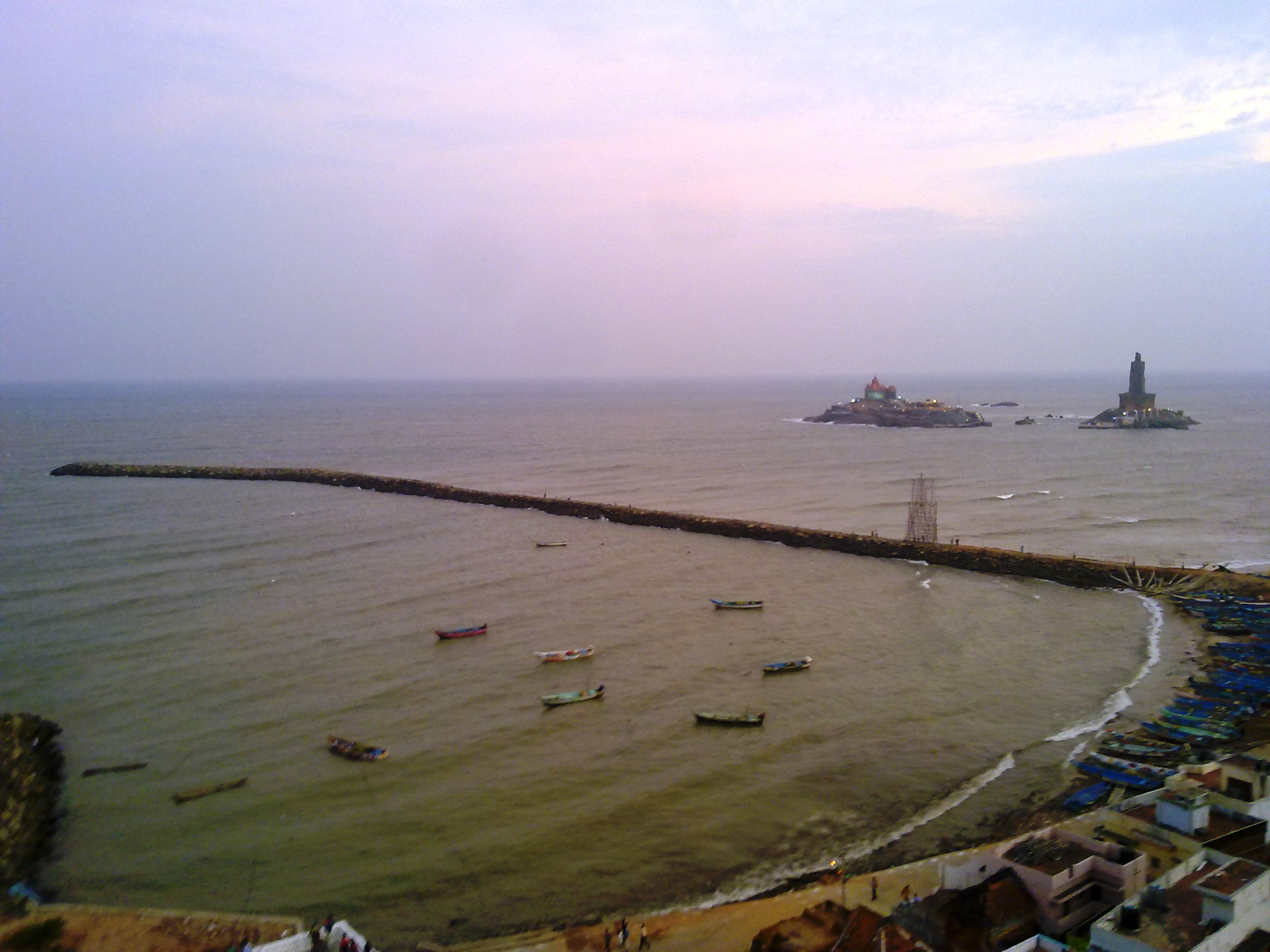
View of Thiruvalluvar statue from the church

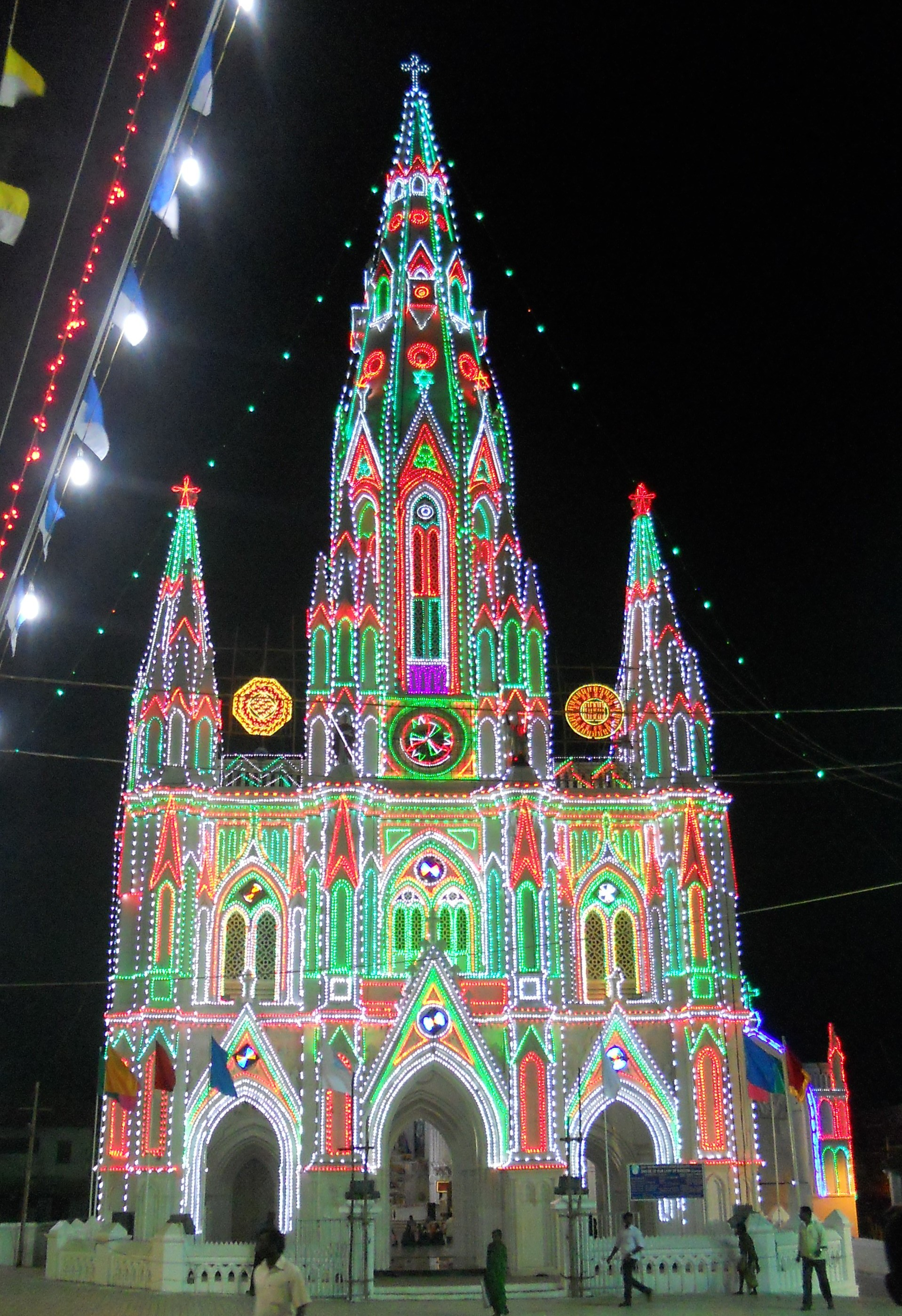

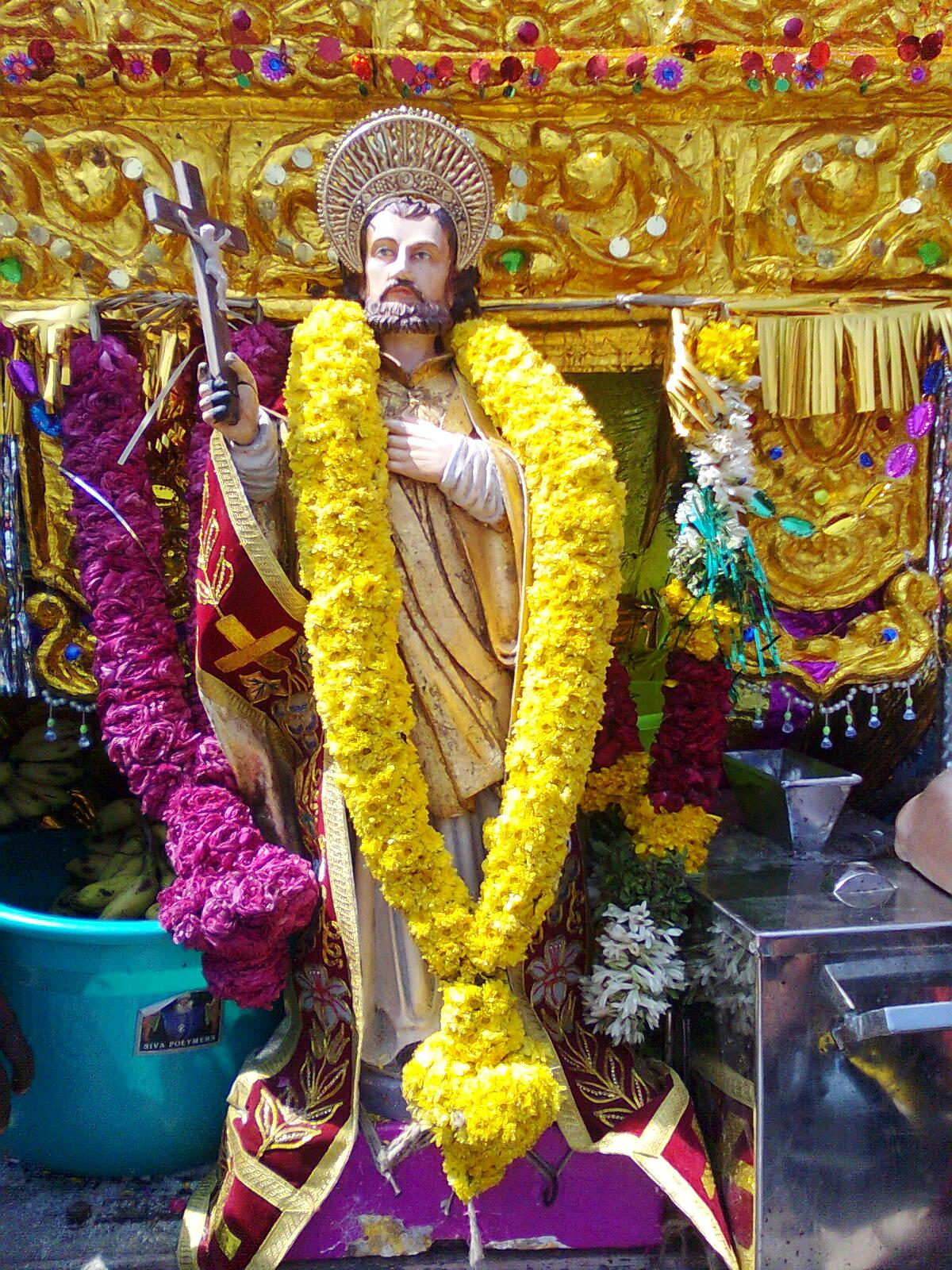
St. Francis Xavier at the car

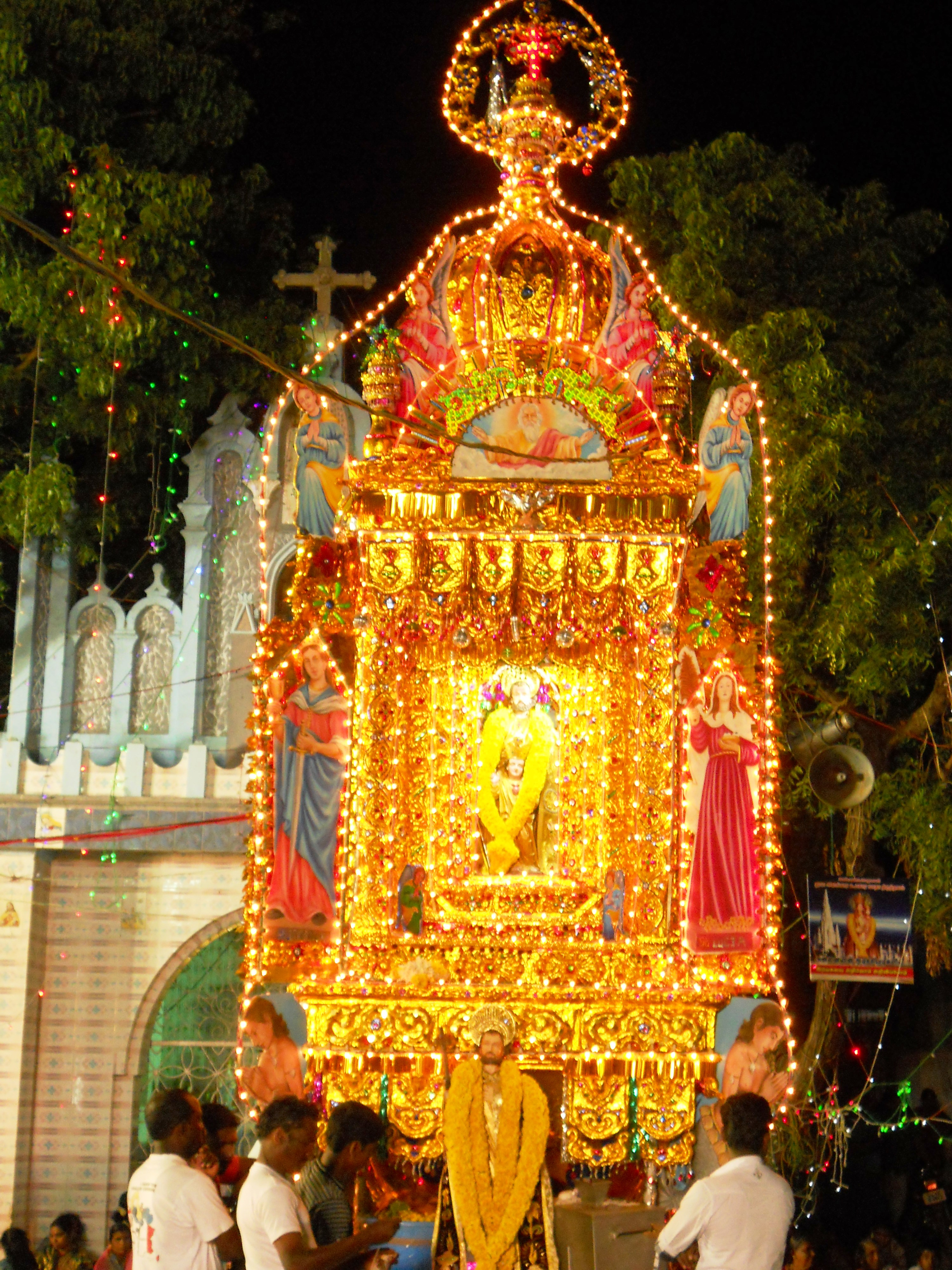
St. Joseph car

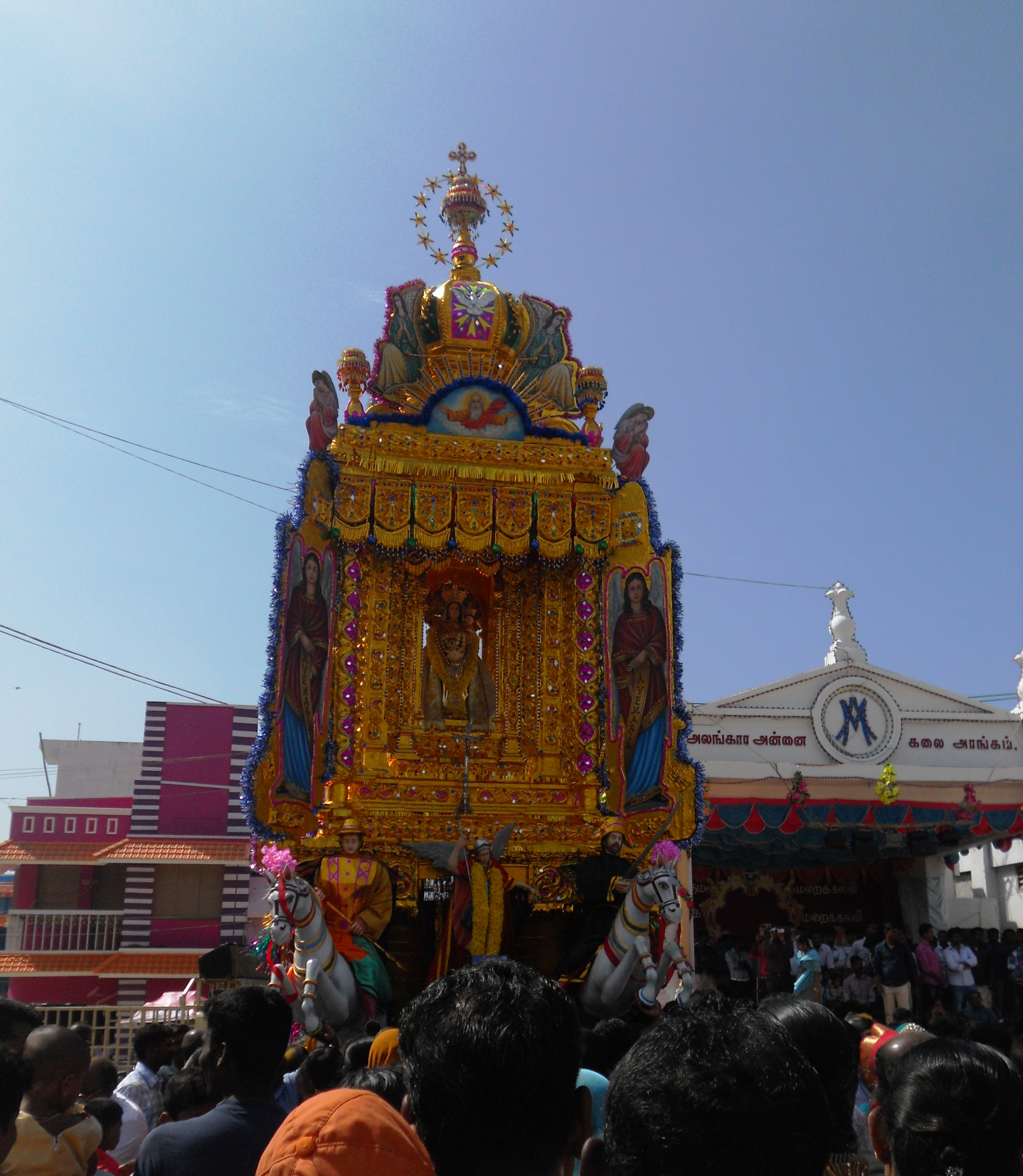
Golden Car of our lady of Ransom
