= Chandrababu =

Chandrababu is a given name. Notable people with the name include:

- N. Chandrababu Naidu, Indian politician
- J. P. Chandrababu (1927–1974), an Indian actor
