= Abraham Pandithar =

Tamil musicologist

Rao Sahib Abraham Pandithar
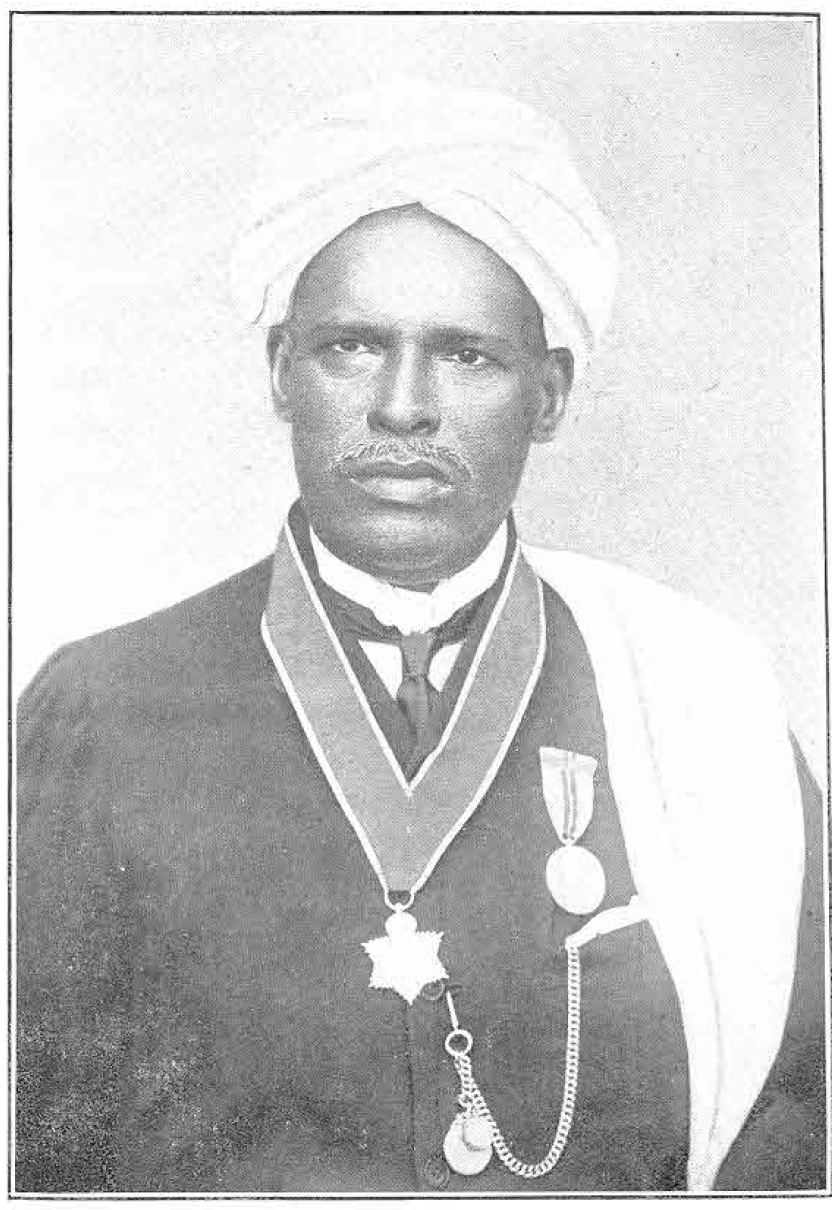
- Abraham Pandithar in 1917
- Born: 2 August 1859; Sambavarvadakarai, Tirunelveli district, Madras Presidency, British India (later Tenkasi district, Tamil Nadu, India)
- Died: 31 August 1919 (aged 60); British India
- Citizenship: British Indian
- Known for: Tamil music books
- Notable work: Karunamirdha Sagaram
- Spouses: Nyanavadivu Ponnammaal(1882-1911), Koil Bakkiyam Ammal
- Children: 9
- Parents: Muthusamy Pandithar (father); Annammal (mother)

Signature
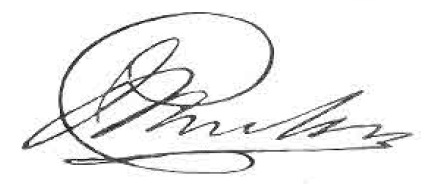

Abraham Pandithar (2 August 1859 – 31 August 1919) was a Tamil musicologist, composer, medical doctor and a traditional medicine practitioner from Sambavar Vadakarai of Tirunelveli District (Then Kollam district), who is celebrated for his patronage of numerous Tamil musicians and his influential studies concerning the origins and evolution of traditional Tamil music.

== Biography ==
Pandithar was born in Sambavar Vadakarai near Surandai in Tirunelveli district to a Tamil Christian Maruthuvar/Pandithar, family (i.e his father Muthusamy belonged to Nadar family and mother Annammal belonged to Maruthuvar family), the son of Muthusamy Pandithar and Annammal Maruthuvar. He studied at the CVES Normal Teachers Training School at Dindugal and in 1876, became a teacher in the same college. He belonged to a family of doctors and became interested in Siddha medicine.

In 1879, he went to Suruli hills to research herbs growing there. There he met the Siddhar Karunandhar and became his student. After completing his studies he went to Tanjore and worked as a Tamil teacher in Lady Napier Girls School. His wife Gnanavadivu Ponnammal was the headmistress in the same school. In 1890, he left his teaching job to do research on medicine full-time. He started a farm outside Tanjore for growing medicinal plants. He named it Karanandhapuram after his teacher. It was called as Pandithar thottam (Pandithar's farm) by the locals. He also started a clinic - the Karunanidhi Medical Hall at his residence in Tanjore. In 1909, the colonial government awarded him the "Pandithar" and "Rao Sahib" titles. In 1911, Gnanavadivu died and Pandithar married Bhagyammal.

The publication of Silapathikaram by U. V. Swaminatha Iyer in 1892, made Pandithar interested in Tamil music and he started studying it. He learnt traditional music due to his interest in sangam poetry, from Sadayandi Bhattar and western classical music from Tanjore A. G. Pichaimuthu pillai. He did extensive research on the origins and form of Tamil music. He established the Sangeetha Vidhyalaya Mahajana Sangam - a music association and organised six music conferences during 1912–1914. In 1917, he published his research into Tamil music as Karunamirdha Sagaram, a 1346-page book, that remains a seminal work in the field till today. He also published Karunamirdha Sagara Thirattu - a collection of Tamil practice songs (musicians of that period trained using Telugu songs). He also translated several Keerthanais into Tamil. He attended the All India Music Conference held at Baroda in 1916 and presented his research there.

== Death and legacy ==
Pandithar died in on 31 August 1919.

In 2008, the Government of Tamil Nadu nationalised his works.
