= Arthur Margoschis =

English Protestant Christian missionary

Arthur Margöschis
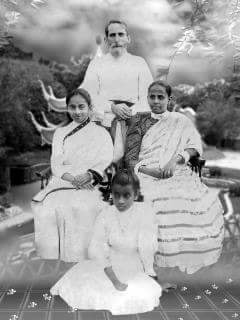
- Born: 24 December 1852; Leamington, Warwickshire, England
- Died: 27 April 1908 (aged 55); Tuticorin, Tamil Nadu, India

Benjamin Henry Arthur Margoschis (24 December 1852 – 27 April 1908) was a Protestant Christian missionary in India. He served the Society for the Propagation of the Gospel in Foreign Parts (SPG) as an overseas missionary in India. The inhabitants of Nazareth, a small town in Tamil Nadu, called him the "Father of Nazareth" and Margoschis Aiyar. Aiyar means clergyman in the native language. Reverend Margoschis was responsible for the development of the small town of Nazareth, which is situated at the southern part of Tamil Nadu, India.

== Early life ==
Arthur Margoschis was born in the village of Leamington in England on 24 December 1852. His parents were Thomas David Samuel Margoschis and Mary Anne Margoschis. Arthur Margoschis was the youngest of eight children. Arthur's father was a Polish Jew and was baptized into the Church of England prior to his marriage. Arthur's father died in 1872. Margoschis was brought to India by Robert Caldwell who at that time was ministering in Idaiyankudi of Tirunelveli District in Tamil Nadu. An adherent of Oxford Movement, Arthur Margoschis, a bachelor, gave up medical school when Caldwell recruited him in London in 1875 for the Nazareth Mission, Tinnevelly. This happened when Arthur Margoschis was in his final year at St Augustine's College, Canterbury. His friends and relatives asked him not to be in a hurry and to complete his final year studies. He answered them that "this is not a job that I can do according to my own convenience". He started immediately for India. Margoschis reached Madras, India at the age of 22 in the year 1875 and then he stayed with Caldwell for some time at Edeyengoody. Arthur Margoschis came to Nazareth in the month of December 1876 after studying and passing a Tamil examination at Edeyengoody. He was ordained Deacon on 25 March 1877 at St. George's Cathedral, Madras and a priest by 1880.

Arthur Margoschis was the younger brother of John Thomas Margoschis who was one of the earliest principals of the SPG College (1868-73), Trichinopoly, which was established in 1864.

== Spiritual life ==
St. John's church in Nazareth, Tamil Nadu was renovated during the period of Margoschis. The back portion of the church was extended. In 2003, the church was renamed as St. John's cathedral, the cathedral church of the Thoothukudi - Nazareth Diocese. 90% of Nazareth's population are Christians. At the time of Margoschis, churches were also built in the nearby villages of Pillaiyanmanai, Thailapuram, and Udaiyarkulam.

Margoschis believed that the natives should not be influenced by wealth or money. Margoschis wrote in 1888:

“Natives of India do not believe in a religion which costs them nothing, and the magnificent temples and shrines to be seen all over the country are the best proof possible of the idea so firmly rooted in their minds that they should be ready to spend and be spent in the service of God. In further actual proof of this opinion, we find that all the great Hindoo and Mohammedan temples are richly endowed by native money, and the income accruing is sufficient for the up-keep of many of them forever. When Hindoos become Christians there is no reason why they should think it the duty of the Mission to support them and theirs for the term of their natural lives. If they foster such an idea, then it must be the fault of their spiritual teachers and pastors, and their Christianity will never be of a robust character”.

His perception on missionary work was independent and also perseverant. He set an example for all missionaries as well as those who call themselves Christians. He stated

“Evangelistic work forms an integral part of the duty of everyone who calls himself a Christian, and though most of our Christians are not qualified to ‘go and teach,’ yet each in his sphere can bear witness to the truth, and thus be a missionary. Fixed days are set apart every week for systematic evangelistic meetings amongst the heathen. If the results are not large or very apparent, the obligation still remains the same.”

The Bishop of Madras made him one of the honor canons of Madras Diocese, praising his devotion and knowledge.

As a Christian town, Nazareth celebrates Christmas in a large scale. Native Nazarenians come together to celebrate Christmas with a fireworks display, lighting the streets and singing Christmas carols at the church. The celebration attracts many former residents each year.

== Work in Nazareth ==
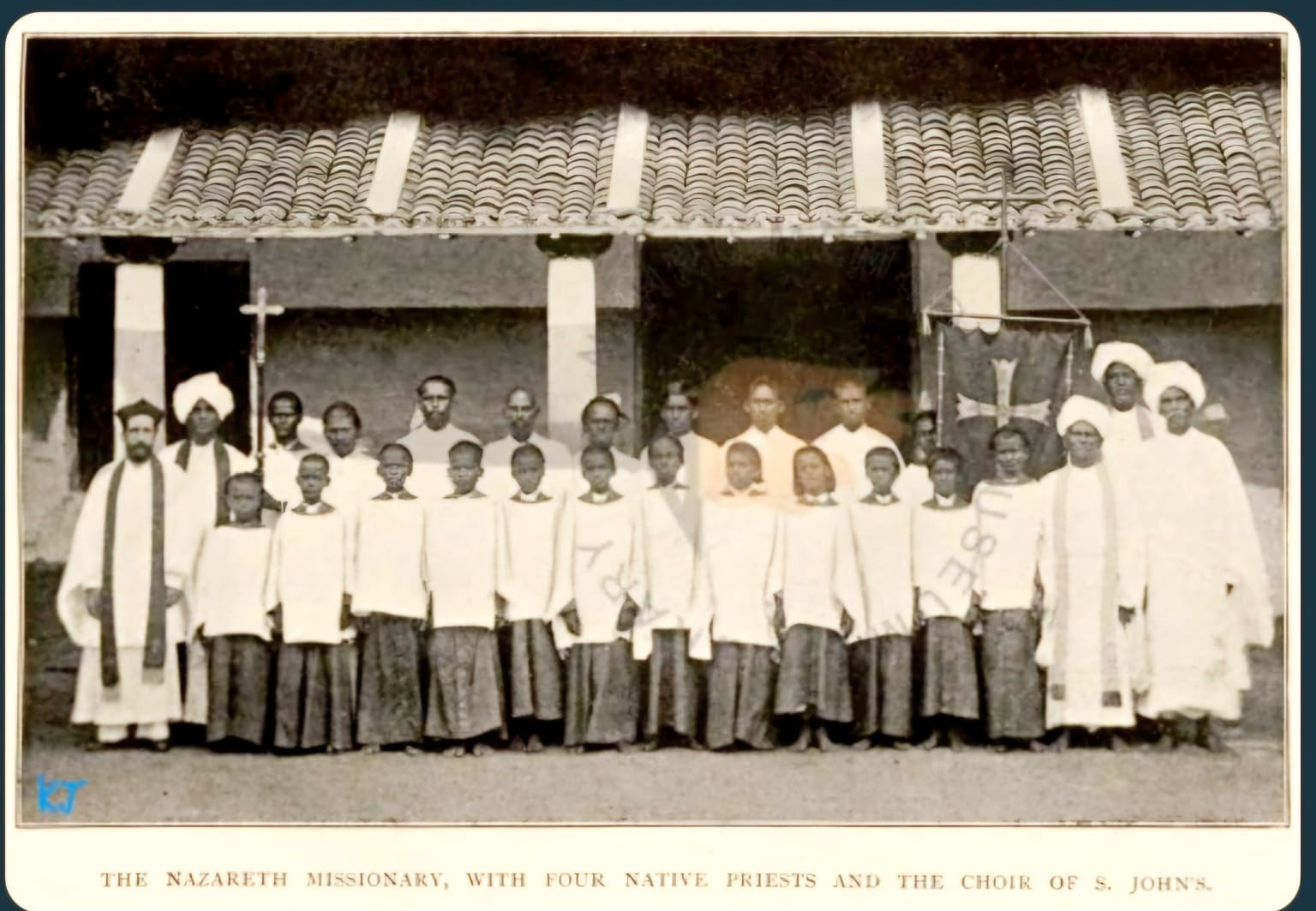

Before the arrival of Arthur Margoschis at Nazareth, Rev. Augustus Frederick Caemmerer and his wife Ann Caemmerer have also made their contributions to this small village. In 1843, Ann Caemmerer started a Girls High School called St. Johns Girls High School, at Nazareth. She is the daughter of Rev. Charles Mead, a LMS Missionary to Travancore. Later, In the year 1876, Rev. Margoschis was made superintendent of this school. Much before to this Ann Caemmerer's school, Rev. James Hough, also Chaplain of the East India Company, at Palamcottah, started a girls school at Nazareth in the year 1819, and it was closed due to financial constraints. St. John’s Girls’ High School at Nazareth, is considered as the first Girls High School in South India.

Reverend Margoschis served as a Medical Officer in charge of the Nazareth Dispensary and Hospital. He was Doctor and a Surgeon. For two hours everyday, Margoschis attended the Hospital and prescribed for his patients. A fee of one penny was charged for the medicine and advice. In this way, he also served the S.P.G Medical Mission from the year 1876. He continued the work of Rev. J. M. Strachan, M.D, Edinburgh University, who opened a regular Medical Mission at Nazareth, in the year 1870. Rev. Margoschis named this hospital as St. Luke's Hospital.

Margoschis contributed vastly to the vital infrastructure and livelihood of the people at Nazareth. He provided Educational institutions, Orphanage, Thrift Fund society, Teachers Training School for girls in the year 1887, Art Industrial School in the year 1878, Theological Seminary, Railway Station, Spinning Mill, Telegraph facility, Roads and other vital infrastructures to the people of Nazareth. It is because of him, the railway line connecting Tiruchendur and Tirunelveli was laid through Nazareth.

In the year 1877, there was a severe famine. Thousands of people died and consequently a large number of children became orphans. Consequent to this, in the year 1878, he started an orphanage, which later became "Art and Industrial School". Rev. Margoschis was supported by the Society for the Propagation of the Gospel (Dursley Branch) and the Indian Famine Orphan Fund.

Due to the presence Arthur Margoschis at Nazareth, incidence such as thievery, banditry and other lawlessness were reduced at Nazareth, and also in the adjoining villages of Vazhaiyadi and Pillaiyanmanai. Thieves were afraid of Arthur Margoschis's influence at the police and judicial departments of the British Government.

Non-Christians also liked Arthur Margoschis. At the Nazareth Dispensary, about one-third of the patients treated are Non-Christians. Hindu boys and girls studied at Nazareth schools. There was a time when Margoschis was travelling to Madras, people of Nazareth were worried if Margoschis could be transferred to Madras. But Margoschis was not transferred. So the people of Nazareth were overjoyed at his return. On his way back to Nazareth, at Palamcottah, several representatives of the congregation greeted Margoschis. At Alvar Thirunagari, Hindus regardless of caste met Margoschis to do him honor with torches and tom-toms, and by bringing temple elephant decorated with howdas. A procession was held. Later, the people of Kadaiyanodai received him in a similar way. As they neared Nazareth, the people of Nazareth joined the procession, with fireworks, torches, and amidst the hurrahs and shouts of the people Margoschis reached Nazareth. On his return, Nazareth was beautifully decorated, and the lamps were kept burning in the streets whole night.

Madras University conferred on Margoschis the title, "Kaisar-i-Hind" in the year 1901 for his public service, a medal was given by the Viceroy of India.

Later in the year 1902, the people of Nazareth were dying of natural calamities such a heavy rain, and cholera. Reverend Margoschis appeared to be a man of short stature with a small beard went round the village on his horseback doing relief work. Rev Margoschis helped those who lost their houses and their belongings.

In the year 1904, Archbishop of Brisbane, in his article "The East & West" praised Margoschis as "A remarkable instance of the work of a solitary unmarried missionary is to be found in Nazareth" in the medical, industrial, educational and evangelical labour being organised and to a large extent created by Canon Margöschis

== Conflict with Robert Caldwell and Other Fellow Missionaries ==
On appointment to the Nazareth mission, Margoschis was soon at dispute with some of his missionary colleagues, in particular with Sharrock and Vickers. They complained that Margoschis make slanderous statements about those with whom he disagreed. At some instances Robert Caldwell had to intervene and settle these disputes

On the use of caste titles, Margoschis disagreed with Sharrock, he viewed the caste names as mere honorifics, and the caste names no longer has religious significance. Margoschis was not bothered about a Christian using a caste title. But Sharrock indicated that some untouchable caste community never support the use of caste titles. Margoschis hoped that missionaries could convert caste with true principles of political economy, social science, and morality. Margoschis said that many rules and observances of caste have a purely social aspect and is quite easy to conceive a state of society in which religious view of caste never obtruded.

In 1849, Rev. Robert Caldwell had published his influential pamphlet, The Tinnevelly Shanars. The people who belonged to the shanar caste felt that Bishop Caldwell has depicted them in a bad image. Later, after the arrival of Rev. Margoschis, Y. Gnanamutthoo Nadar, a native of Nazareth, Tamil Nadu, and a Shanar Christian clerk in Tirunelveli courts, protested this publication. Hence Robert Caldwell suspected Rev. Margoschis, who was working at Nazareth at that time, to be behind this protest.

Furthermore, Arthur Margoschis founded a Middle school (which has now become Margoschis Higher Secondary School, named after him) for boys in 1882 in the name "Anglo – Vernacular School". Notably, In the year 1885, this school was awarded "The Best School" title by the Presidency of Madras. This school was upgraded to the status of a high school in 1889 by the efforts of Margoschis.

Bishop Caldwell, who had already started a high school at Sawyerpuram in 1862, considered the high school started by Margoschis, a rival school. Besides, the Madras Diocesan Committee of the S.P.G. had given permission to Margoschis to start the school, ignoring Caldwell's protest and opposition. But Caldwell was stubborn and he managed to get the school closed in 1892, leaving behind the Middle School for boys.

In an unusual untoward incident at the church, A. N. Sattampillai, a catechist and teacher with the SPG mission was suspended by Rev. Caemmerer, on the grounds that he did not marry a girl which the Reverend has chosen for him. On this incidence, Rev. Margoschis in his writing stated

“In the olden days it was not uncommon for the missionary, to a considerable extent, to arrange the domestic affairs of his flock. The Christians were in statu pupillari and required many matters to be done for them. In this way, the missionary of Nazareth arranged a marriage for Sattampillai, who had ideas of his own, and some other lady than the one selected by the missionary was in his eye. He refused to marry the girl chosen by the missionary, who thereupon, dismissed him from service.”

== Death ==
Arthur Margoschis was severely handicapped by chronic asthma. After 31 years of service at Nazareth, Margoschis died on 27 April 1908. Arthur Margoschis was buried inside the St. John's Church, Nazareth premises.

The people of Nazareth commemorated the 100th Death centenary of Canon Arthur Margoschis at Nazareth from 23 April to 27 April, in the year 2008. Some years before, the town of Nazareth has become famous for producing lot of sports personalities, especially in football. To commemorate Reverend Margoschis every year, 'Canon Margoschis Memorial trophy' State-level football tournament, is organized by the Margoschis Recreation Club, with the teenagers of this town involving largely, at Nazareth.

== Bibliographies ==
- Margoschis (Oct. 1893) 'Christianity and caste', The Indian Church Quarterly Review - Three Centuries of Mission: The United Society for the Propagation of the Gospel 1701-2000 - Book by Daniel O'Connor
