= Pandaravilai =

- village
- Pandaravilai
- Nickname: 7 City
- Location in Tamil Nadu, India Pandaravilai (India)
- Coordinates: 8.656320°N 77.99753°E
- Country: India
- State: Tamil Nadu
- District: Tuticorin

Population
  - Total: 2,500

Languages
  - Official: Tamil
- Time zone: UTC+5:30 (IST)
- PIN: 628751
- Telephone code: 91-4630
- Vehicle registration: TN92
- Nearest city: Eral
- Lok Sabha constituency: Tuticorin
- Vidhan Sabha constituency: Srivaikuntam
- Climate: Aw (Köppen)

Pandravilai or Eazhur Pandaravilai is a village in Eral Taluk in Tuticorin District. It is part of Perungulam town panchayat and comes under Eral Police border within Srivaikundam constituency.

== History ==
This village has seven huge streets.

== Religion ==
Hindu and Christianity are the major religions. The village has three Christian churches (2 CSI Churches, 1 Apostolic Church) and multiple temples.

== Geography ==
On the north side Pandaravilai is surrounded by a pond called Perungulam. It is located in 30 km towards South from District headquarters Thoothukudi. 646 km from State capital Chennai. The nearby villages are Pannaivilai, Perungulam, Nattathi, Sawyerpuram.

== Notable residents ==
- Ex. Minister of Tamilnadu Legislative Assembly in ADMK Party, S.P. Shanmuganathan.
- Bishop of Thoothukudi-Nazareth Diocese, Rt. Rev. Dr. S.E.C. Devasahayam

== Transport ==
=== Railway stations ===
- Kurumbur- 13.4 Km
- Tiruchendur- 26.7 Km
- Tuticorin- 27.6 Km

=== Airport ===
- Tuticorin- 16,9 Km
