= A. N. Sattampillai =

Tamilian convert to the Anglican church

Arumai Nayakam Sattampillai (1823–1918), known popularly as Arumainayagam Sattampillai, Arumainayagam, Sattampillai or Suttampillai (also spelt as Sattam Pillai), a Tamilian convert to the Anglican church, was a catechist and the founder of first indigenous and independent Hindu Church of Lord Jesus, rejecting Western missionaries domination for the first time in the history of Indian subcontinent. This subversion paved the way for the development of a fusion model of Hindu-Christian religion, free from European missionary interference and also inspired the Indian national movement, largely centred on Bengal and Madras Presidency to fight against Western-dominated institutionalized church leading to separation of Christ from Church and Indianization of Christianity: to express and interpret Christianity and Biblical text in Indian context, socially, culturally, and religiously.

He was also the founder of indigenous Seventh Day sect on the outskirts of town Nazareth, Tamil Nadu, and was indirectly responsible for establishing the first Seventh-day Adventist church in South India – Tamil Nadu.

== Biography ==
He was educated at missionary schools run by Society for the Propagation of the Gospel (SPG), an Anglican missionary society and also known by the name Society for the Propagation of the Gospel in Foreign Parts, presently known by the name United Society for the Propagation of the Gospel (USPG) from 1996. He was trained at a seminary run by SPG. He studied Hebrew and Greek languages, and was considered a great intellect, winning several prizes as a seminarian. He acquired the title Sattampillai, as a young man for being the monitor or classroom student leader, at the SPG seminary in Sawyerpuram.

He worked in a missionary school and was associated with missionaries as a Catechist. He was a staunch Christian and acquired considerable knowledge of Christian history and Biblical literature—both Old Testament and New Testament.

== Hindu church of Lord Jesus ==
The monopoly and domination of Indian churches by Western missionaries grew larger when missionaries established a cordial relationship with the state -- British Raj or East India Company before. The effects of this Western dominance was felt not only in politics but also in the religious sphere, and European missionaries gradually started portraying Indian indigenous religious practices as inferior and targeted converts for alleged anti-white (European) sentiments.

The Christian missionaries started establishment of their mission stations in Tinnevelly District (colonial British East India Company named it, present Tirunelveli district) of Tamil Nadu in the early 19th century. They established their mission stations—first at Mudalur, and followed by ones at Bethlehem and Nazareth, Tamil Nadu in Tinnevelly district. By 1803, a large number of Shanars (also known as Nadar) to the extent of more than 5,000 Shanars were converted to Christianity in southeastern Tinnevelly. In addition to this, with growing opposition to Western colonialism in Asia, especially in India and China from the mid-19th century, the indigenous people perceived Western Christianity as the surrender to Colonialism and suspected Western Christianity in having de-nationalising influence.

Not being comfortable with paternalistic and domineering mindset of SPG European missionaries, he looks to have had conflicts and disliked SPG missionaries like Augustus Frederick Caemmerer, a priest and author of Mission of Nazareth, in the District of Tinnevelly. Report for the Year 1845, and Robert Caldwell, an assistant bishop at Tirunelveli and evangelist. Suttampillai worked as catechist under Caemmerer, who was considered as an obnoxious missionary with a low opinion on indigenous converts. Suttampillai had conflicts with Caemmerer and Caldwell, both in theology and on the personal front; on the theological side, Suttampillai objected to the placing of the cross on the altar, which he considered as against the biblical injunction and interpreted as a sign of idolatry; on the personal side, anti-Western missionary feeling further fuelled when Robert Caldwell published The Tinnevelly Shanars, a quasi-ethnographical study of the Shanar community to which Sattampillai belongs; The study included some passages that deliberately disparaged Shanar community. For example, in Caldwell's view, they are the 'least intellectual people found in India', the majority of the community were marked by apathy, indifference, ignorance, and vice, and, again according to Caldwell, the religion followed by members of the Shanar community who were not yet converted was a 'school of immorality'.

Under these circumstances and this context with the domineering mentality of Western missionaries against heathens, a desire arose in Arumainayagam Sattampillai to re-cast Christianity into a native and national social and cultural framework, to be interpreted as Hindu. It is also believed that, as Sattam Pillai was not willing to go by the British customary way of worship service, he started to garner like-minded believers and worship the Trinity in an Indian traditional way; accordingly, Sattampillai revolted against the Western superior mindset over Indian Christians, broke out from SPG, and established the "Hindu church of Lord Jesus", also known as "Indian church of the only Savior," in 1857 at Prakasapuram (present Pragasapuram), Tirunelveli district. He established his new church, the Hindu church of Lord Jesus, with Hindu-Christian religion as its faith, to subvert the missionary authority and denounced Western Christianity as corrupt and inauthentic—he interpreted Hindu as a geographical term (living across Indus river and/or in social and cultural context), rather than in a religious context; furthermore, he looks to have interpreted the Hindu customs as Indian customs. Over the period, the converted Christians in India started to interpret and express Christianity by employing their innate social, religious, and cultural categories. The year 1857 is significant, as uprising against the British Raj was already occurring in Northern India as part of the Indian Rebellion of 1857. Suttampillai revolted against Western dominance in Indian churches using a two-fold strategy; one, by separating Christ from Church and accommodating native traditions and customs into Christianity, he succeeded in undermining the authority of Western missionaries; two, he appropriated Hebrew scriptures and Jewish customs into the Church supporting the Old Testament rather than New Testament as an antidote against the Western missionaries who were moving towards a New Testament focus with British Raj support.

The church rejected from their system everything that they perceived as having a savour of a European origin. They cut completely from all European help in money and influence, as if there were no longer any Europeans in the country. Sattampillai also seems to have claimed that Hindu cultural practices are similar to the Jewish cultural practices. His interpretations and inclusive approach made him incorporate (accommodate) "presumed Indian cultures as Hindu culture" into his movement such as prostration, sacrifice, use of frankincense, folding their hands while praying to deities, using unfermented grape juice instead of wine, and sitting on the floor. In the rituals of the Church, Old Testament ritualistic practices such as "ritual impurities attributed to women" were also practised in this church, as similar practices were also found in Indian (Hindu) religious rituals. Unlike the Anglican church use of bells, they use a trumpet. A trumpet blast from the church tower summons the faithful to worship, and followers wash their hands and feet before entering the sanctuary, where they punctuate the service with bodily prostration. The worship is usually held on Saturday Sabbath. People belonging to this church don't work on Saturdays. Food for Saturday is made before 6 pm on Friday. They use Jewish calendar to celebrate feast days as followed in Old Testament days. He denied the efficacy of infant baptism and abandoned the idea of an ordained ministry, declaring that "anyone might become a minister of the Gospel."

=== Apologetics against Western Christianity ===
He was strongly against the Western missionary Christianity and directed his apologetics to exposing their decadence, sexual immorality, and materialism that was rampant among Westerners, both in India and Europe. He cited the works of John Parker, William Howitt, Robert Southey, and Abbe Dubois that spoke of the savage nature of Saxons, their extravagant indulgence, drunken behaviour, polygamous marriage practices, and the rampant prostitution in western capitals.

He not only attacked the lifestyle of Europeans, but denounced Europeans as immoral, depraved, and whorish. In a series of tracts written by Sattampillai, he tried to impose strict discipline to make his community above reproach, and consistently disparaged Europeans (mostly English people, but could also be meant to include Americans and Continentals) for their lax sexual morality and lack of control over women. He was severe on divorce and re-marriage, especially of offspring of such unions: in his view, Holy Church and the country was greatly polluted by admitting such despicable families procreating culpable offspring into the church communion. He loathed the European woman, who once married to one man was able to remarry subsequent to divorce or widowhood; Sattampillai objected to this as a total violation to the laws laid out in both the Hebrew Bible and the New Testament. Sattampillai also wrote that Europeans strayed from the true path, after Roman kings like Constantine and Theodorus converted to Christianity and introduced their own immoral rules regarding marriage into the laws of the Holy Church.

Sattampillai preached that Jesus did not intend for Christians to abandon the laws given in the Hebrew Bible. According to Sattampillai, this is one among several of moral lapses and transgressions by European Christians. Sattampillai sought to correct the distortions wrought on the original form of Christianity by European Christians by returning to the laws of the Hebrew Bible.

=== The Tinnevelly Shanars controversy ===
Robert Caldwell in his derisive comments on Shanars using The Tinnevelly Shanars publication is said to have commented that "Shanar have no caste to raise, and they are conscious that were it not for the protection of the Missionaries and of Christianity, their condition would be deplorable." [sic]. Caldwell argued that Shanars could be considered Hindus only to the extent that "Hindu" was a geographical category that included "any class in India."

The controversy initiated by Sattampillai over The Tinnevelly Shanars again was resuscitated in 1880 when Y. Gnanamuthoo Nadar (a Tamil Christian clerk in the Tirunelveli courts, antiquarian and representative of the Shanar race, son of the first Indian catechists in SPG in Nazareth area, and a former catechist of CMS) petitioned the colonial British government and missionary ecclesiastical structure, demanding that the British censure Caldwell and remove the offending book from its publication. Gnanamuthoo continued his fight with SPG missionaries, demanding they retract their slanderous statements about their caste and including disrupting the bishops when they travelled to villages to convert between 1880 and 1885. According to Gnanamuthoo, many of the Nadar christians either reverted to Hinduism or joined the Hindu Christian church founded by Sattampillai in 1857 out of anger. Gnanamuthoo also wrote:

This is the way the European Missionaries deal with their converts and fellow Christians, whome they pretend to acknowledge to have equal claims to sense, and honour, and to the kingdom of Heaven.

With the impetus provided by the A.N. Sattampillai movement in revolting against Western church, educated Nadars (also known as Shanar), having got The Tinnevelly Shanars publication several years earlier, became furious and protested against Caldwell, demanding the removal of The Tinnevelly Shanars from publication. As part of this effort, Nadars produced a series of arguments to substantiate their claims against Caldwell's portrayal of Shanars, took a form of street corner oratory, published pamphlets, and in early 1880 filed an official petition to the British Raj in the Madras Presidency to retract the odious Tinnevelly Shanars publication and censure Robert Caldwell.

Caldwell looks to have partly retracted his statements, especially his evaluation that Shanars were "not Hindus," in a letter that was printed in the CMS Record of February 1880.

==== Hardgrave's hypothesis ====
Sattampillai's activism was centred on the rejection of Western manners and customs. His writings reveal how vehemently some Indian Christians rejected the ideas of civilisation and moral progress embedded in the prevailing colonial model of conversion as a series of stages. It is believed that he was dismissed for allegedly having remarked on foreign missionaries.

Robert L. Hardgrave, an author of The Nadars of Tamilnadu, Portrait of the Hindus: Balthazar Solvyns & the European image of India, 1760–1824, Boats of Bengal: eighteenth century portraits, The Dravidian movement, and several other similar works, has hypothesized that Sattampillai, disgruntled for having been dismissed as a catechist, had somehow discovered Robert Caldwell's pamphlets with disdainful comments on the Shanar caste. Hardgrave believes that Sattampillai, who was supposed to visit Madras in 1850 to plead for his reinstatement with the SPG Corresponding committee, could have discovered Caldwell's pamphlets that ultimately instigated him to resent and revolt against European missionaries during that time.

== Seventh-day Adventist Church ==
Sattampillai, founder of the indigenous Seventh Day sect at the Nazareth town in Tamil Nadu, received a copy of a booklet containing a lecture delivered by the Seventh Day Baptist representative at the World's Parliament of Religions, which brought representatives from different religious backgrounds together in order to bring forth truths and commonalities across various religions. It was held in 1893 in Chicago, United States. Sattampillai, having believed that it was only the Jews who observed the seventh day as Sabbath, sent a letter to New York with curiosity to know more about the Sabbath. However, the letter reached a Seventh-day Adventist office in Battle Creek, Michigan; hence, F. M. Woolcox sent him a few books and magazines in a reply.

In 1906, J.S. James from Minnesota was chosen to work in South India; accordingly, he was sent as an Adventist missionary to Bangalore with his wife and two sons. James, having learnt the Tamil language, translated a few pamphlets into Tamil, such as "Is the end of the world near?", "Which day is Sabbath?", "The signs of Christ's second coming", and "New Testament Sabbath". Sattampillai, having received and studied them, sought more explanation about them.

In 1908, James along with G. F. Enoch and J. L. Shaw visited Tirunelveli by train and reached Nazareth by bullock-cart; they were received with awesome ceremonial celebrations participated in by people in the hundreds, including women and children from Hindu Yeka Ratchahar church. They were accommodated for 10 days in a local school and on 2 July 1908, the Church donated two acres of land worth 1,000 rupees to James, marking the beginning of the Seventh-day Adventist presence there, as James decided to quit Bangalore and stay in Prakasapuram (also spelt Pragasapuram), an adjoining village to Mukuperi.

The first church of Seventh-day Adventists in South India was formally organised with 50 members on 30 January 1915 in Prakasapuram, although, it was in fact functioning as early as 1908. James and C.G. Lowry conducted the religious service. Later, the Adventist Church also started an educational institution with the name James Memorial School in Prakasapuram.

== Works ==
- A Brief Sketch of the Hindu Christian Dogmas, 1890.
- Ruttammavai(Song of Ruth), 1884.
