= Christopher Asir =

A. Christopher Asir
- Bishop in Madurai Ramnad
- Church: Christian
- See: Church of South India
- In office: 2004–2012

Orders
- Ordination: 1977
- Consecration: 23 September 2004

Personal details
- Born: 5 December 1947 Pannaivilai, Tamil Nadu, India
- Died: 3 February 2012 (aged 64) Madurai

Asirwadham Christopher Asir (5 December 1947 – 3 February 2012) was the bishop of Madurai Ramnad Diocese of Church of South India. He had also served as the Deputy moderator of Church of South India.

== Early years ==
Christopher Asir was born on 5 December 1947 in Tamil Nadu. His parents were Sri P. Asir and Smt. Packiam Asir. He died on 3 February 2012 at the Madurai Meenakshi Mission Hospital after battling with cancer.

The young Asir was sent to CSI Tucker Higher Secondary School, Pannaivilai and later to the Pope's College, Sawyerpuram for collegiate studies.

== Divinity and higher studies ==
Since childhood, Asir had an inclination to pursue divinity. He was sent to the Hindustan Bible Institute (affiliated to the Senate of Serampore College (University)), Chennai, where he obtained a Licentiate in Theology. Later, he upgraded this with a B.Th. degree.

Starting from the academic year 1973, Asir joined the United Theological College, the only autonomous college under the Senate of Serampore College (University), Bangalore for pursuing the B.D. degree. Joshua Russell Chandran was the Principal of the College at that time while D. S. Satyaranjan was the Registrar of the College. By 1975, Christopher completed his studies in UTC and was awarded the degree by the Senate of Serampore College (University) under the Registrarship of Chetti Devasahayam.

His thesis submitted to the Senate of Serampore College (University) was entitled "A Historical Survey of the Sectarian Church Groups in the C.S.I. Diocese of Tinneveli in the 20th century".

== Ordination and Lecturership ==
After returning from Bangalore, Asir was assigned a pastoral role in Kannivadi. Later, he was ordained as a Deacon of the Diocese of Madurai Ramnad of the Church of South India in 1976.

During his service in Vedachandur from 1976 to 1978, he was ordained as a Priest in 1977.

Asir was also assigned a teaching role in his alma mater, the Hindustan Bible Institute, Chennai.

== Bishopric ==
The Diocese of Madurai Ramnad was founded in 1834. About six revenue districts fall under this diocese. Lesslie Newbigin was the first Bishop of this diocese.

On 23 September 2004 Asir was consecrated as the Bishop in Madurai Ramnad.

== Deputy Moderatorship ==
The first Bishop in Madurai Ramnad, Lesslie Newbigin also served as Deputy Moderator of the CSI.

During the XXXI session of the Synod of the CSI held in Visakhapatnam from 11–14 January 2008, Asir was elected as the Deputy Moderator of the CSI for a biennium. He succeeded the S. Vasantha Kumar (Bishop-in-Karnataka Central).

Bishop Asir died on 3 February 2012. He was receiving treatment for his lung cancer. His funeral was on 4 February 2012.

The Bishop of Madurai-Ramnad Diocese A Christopher Asir and 10 others in contravention of the conditions sold 6.74 acres of the total land in RS.No. 88 at Tallakulam Village on 5 February 2008 for Rs 16.79 crore. It was alleged that Asir and 10 others misappropriated Rs 7 crore out of the total amount. Corruption charges against Bishop Christopher Asir of Madurai-Ramnad were brought by the Indian government for tax fraud. The District Revenue Collector of Madurai charged the bishop with being part of a criminal ring that defrauded the diocese of $1,400,000 by selling college land and pocketing the proceeds. The bishop died in February 2012 before he could be indicted.

As part of the same charges, an Indian court in October 2012 overturned the appointment of the head of the Church of South India's American College, arguing that the now deceased bishop in Madurai-Ramnad had colluded with his son-in-law to engineer the younger man's appointment as principal.

As a result of a lawsuit brought by a member of the staff, Justice Vinod Kumar Sharma quashed the appointment of M. Davamani Christopher as principal of the American college. The court accepted the petitioner's claim that the bishop and his son-in-law had created a search committee composed of their cronies and had participated in subsequent board meetings "without revealing the fact that Mr. Christopher had applied to the post of Principal as early as 21 February 2011. It is clear proof of collusion between the two."

== Works ==
- CSI College of Dental Sciences & Research, Madurai 625 001 .
- CSI arts an science college batalagundu

== Honours ==
Prof. Dr Michael Bergunder, Professor of History of Religions and Mission Studies of the University of Heidelberg, Germany quoted Rev. Christopher's B. D. thesis in an article entitled "From Pentecostal Healing Evangelist to Kalki Avatar: The Remarkable Life of Paulaseer Lawrie, alias Shree Lahari Krishna (1921–1989) – A Contribution to the Understanding of New Religious Movements" in a book published by William B. Eerdmans Publishing, Grand Rapids, Michigan, with the title "Christians and Missionaries in India: Cross-cultural communication since 1500 with special reference to caste, conversion, and colonialism" in 2003.

== Memberships ==
- Chairperson
  - CSI Dental College, Madurai
- Member, Chethana, a Bengaluru-based network of grassroot organisations.

== See also ==
- Lesslie Newbigin, previously Bishop-in-Madurai Ramnad
- Victor Premasagar, previously Moderator of the CSI and Bishop-in-Medak
- J. W. Gladstone, Moderator of the CSI and Bishop-in-South Kerala
- B. P. Sugandhar, previously Moderator of the CSI and Bishop-in-Medak
- G. Dyvasirvadam, Bishop-in-Krishna Godavari

Religious titles
Preceded by The Right Reverend S. Vasantha Kumar	Deputy Moderator Church of South India; 11 January 2008 – 10 January 2010	Succeeded by The Right Reverend G. Devakadasham
Preceded by The Right Reverend D. Thavaraj David Eames	Bishop in Madurai Ramnad Church of South India; 2004–2012	Succeeded by The Most Reverend Dr.M.Joseph M.A., B.G.L., B.D., M.Th., Ph.D.,
