= Vellarikaiurani =

Vellarikaiurani is a small village situated near Nazareth in Thoothukudi District of Tamil Nadu, India.

There are about 250 families are living in this village. The village is primarily home to people from Devar community. There is a Devar statue recently installed in this village. A new road from Nazareth to this village crossing over Puthukulam has improved the connectivity of this village (especially during the rainy season).
