= Samuel Devasahayam =

Bishop of Thoothukudi Nazareth Diocese

The Right Reverend Samuel Devasahayam
- Bishop of Thoothukudi-Nazareth Diocese
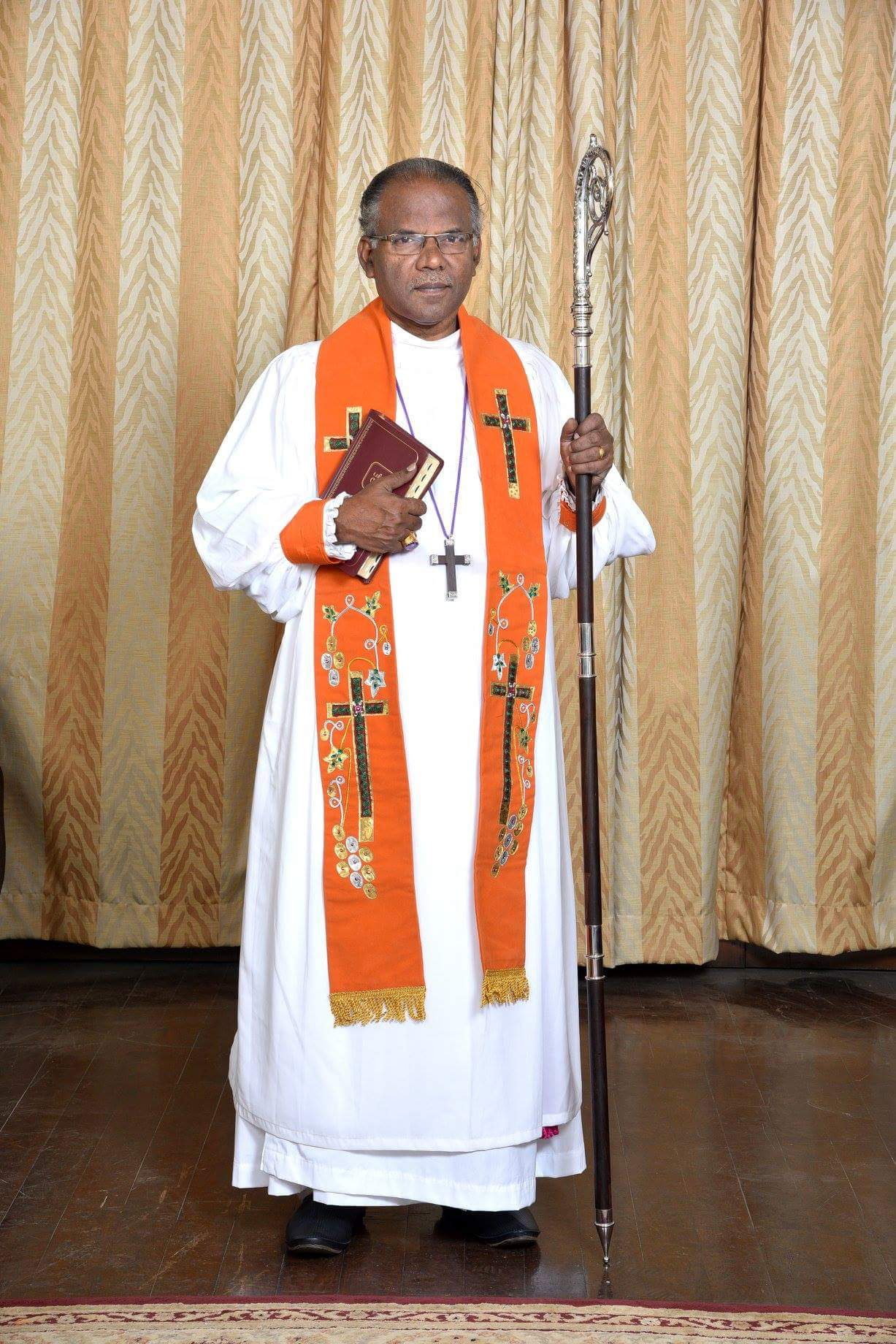
- Devasahayam
- Church: Church of South India
- Diocese: Thoothukudi-Nazareth Diocese
- In office: 2017 to 2027
- Predecessor: J. A. D. Jebachandran

Orders
- Ordination: 10 June 1984
- Consecration: 11 June 2017 by Thomas K Oommen (principal consecrator) and Vadapalli Prasada Rao (co-consecrator)
- Rank: Bishop

Personal details
- Born: Samuel Devasahayam Ebenezer Clement; 2 April 1957 (age 69) Pandaravilai, Tamilnadu

Samuel Ebenezer Clement Devasahayam is the second Bishop of Thoothukudi - Nazareth Diocese of the Church of South India.

== Early years ==
Devasahayam did his college education at Pope's College at Sawyerpuram and gained Bachelor of Divinity from Tamil Nadu Theological Seminary.

== Ecclesiastical Ministry ==
Devasahayam was ordained as Deacon in 1983 and as Presbyter in 1984 by S. Daniel Abraham, Bishop of Tirunelveli. He was elected and selected as the Bishop of Thoothukudi - Nazareth Diocese of the Church of South India in June 2017 and consecrated bishop at St. John's Cathedral, Nazareth on 11 June 2017 by CSI Moderator Thomas K Oommen.
