= Pattakkarai =

- Village
- Location of Pattakkarai in Tamil Nadu Pattakkarai (India)
- Coordinates: 8°34′32″N 78°0′13″E
- Country: India
- State: Tamil Nadu
- District: Thoothukudi
- Time zone: UTC+5:30 (IST)
- PIN code: 628618

Pattakkarai is a small village situated near Nazareth in the Thoothukudi District of Tamil Nadu, India. It is located on the road from Nazareth, which is 4 km away, to Tiruchendur. There are about 150 families in this village who live in more than 200 houses. It belongs to the Kachanavilai panchayat.

Facilities in Pattakkarai include a C.S.I church (Holy Immanuel Church) and a post office. The majority of the population is Christian. Their business is fishing, gardening and cultivation. The main community is the Nadar caste which belongs to the Ruban community from Israel. Every year, people celebrate the church inauguration day on 18 May. The same day, people donate food for people from the church.
