= Nalumavadi =

- Village
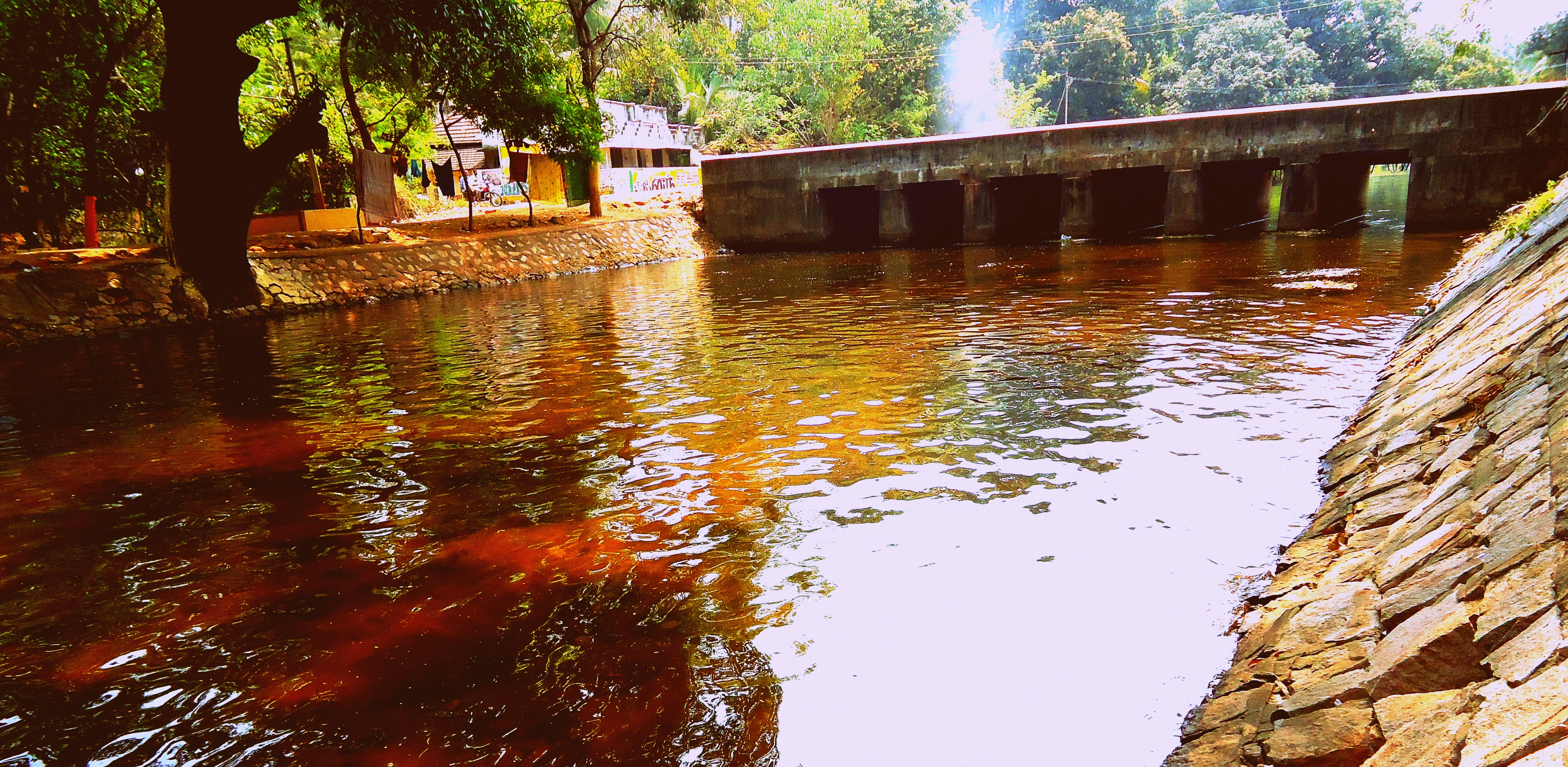
- Interactive map of Nalumavadi
- Coordinates: 8°57′22.35″N 78°58′15.64″E
- Country: India
- State: Tamil Nadu
- District: Tuticorin
- Named for: Mango trees

Government
  - Body: Panchayat

Population (2010)
  - Total: 5,088
  - Rank: 23

Languages
  - Official: Tamil
- Time zone: UTC+5:30 (IST)
- PIN: 628211
- Vehicle registration: TN-69
- Nearest city: Thiruchendur

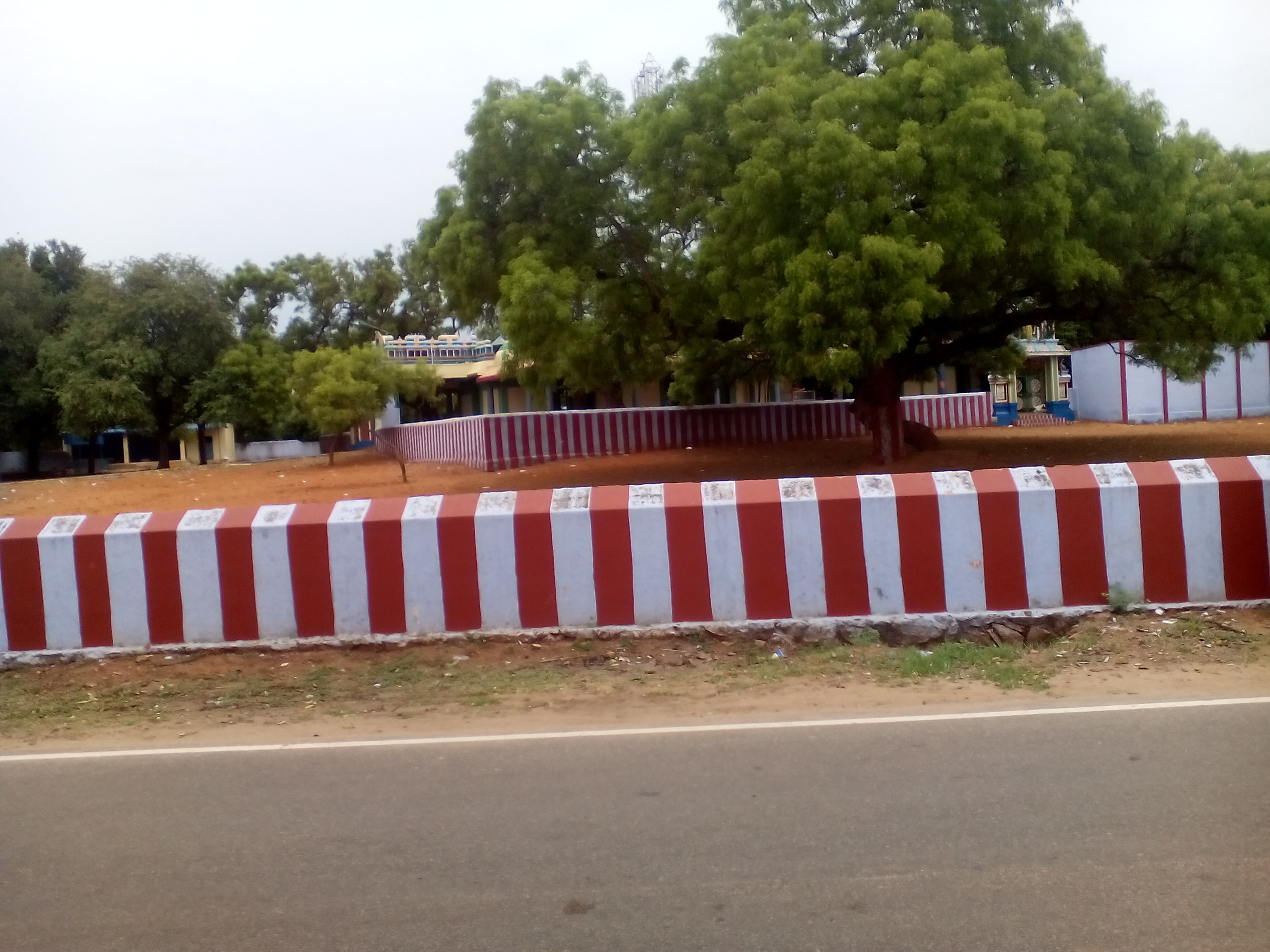
Pathakarai Swamy Temple vaikundaraja.s

Nalumavadi is a settlement on the southern edge of the Indian peninsula in Thoothukudi District. It has a population of approximately 5,486 spanning around 1378 households. There is an abundance of mango groves in the village amongst four large Mangifera indica trees. It has been named Nalumavadi in Tamil, which means "under the shadow of four mango trees".

== Religion ==
There are places of worship for Hindus Christians and Muslims. A Church of South India congregation was established in 1841 by Reverend John Thomas and St John's church was built in 1842, extended in 1850 and rebuilt in 1926. The pastorate is part of the Thoothukudi - Nazareth diocese. The worldwide Christian Mission Organization called "Jesus Redeems Ministries" is located here and doing lot of spiritual and social activities by its founder Bro. Mohan C. Lazarus, the Gospel and Preacher. Website: www.jesusredeems.com
