= Oyangudi =

- village
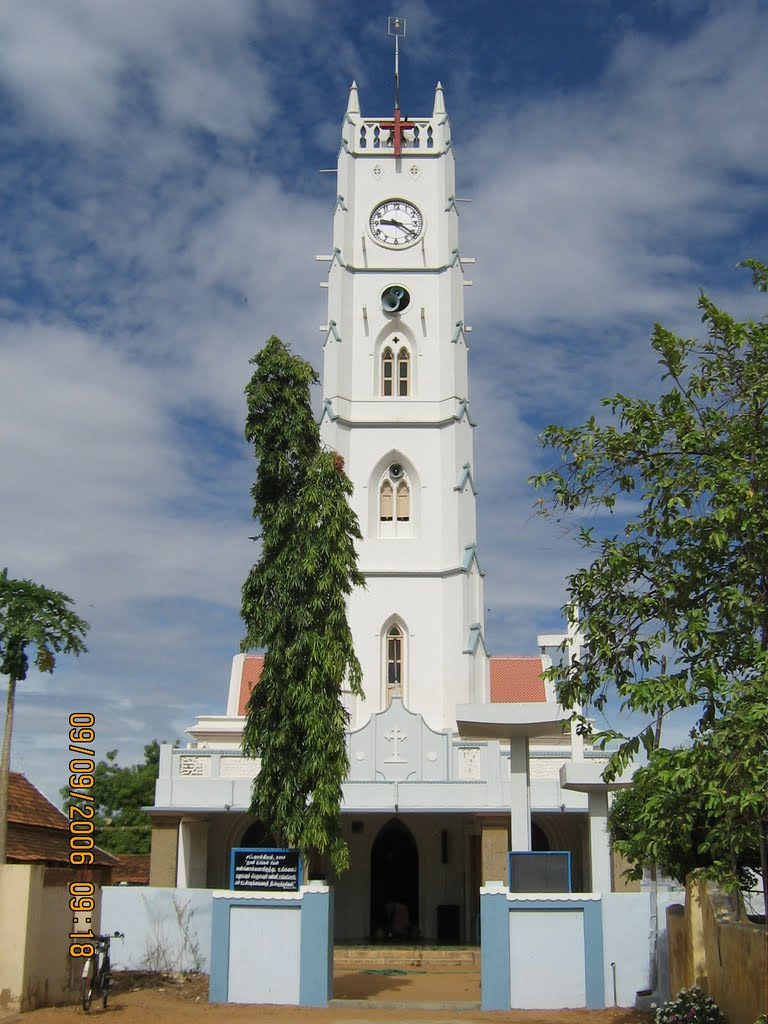
- Holy Trinity Church
- Country: India
- State: Tamil Nadu

Languages
  - Official: Tamil
- Time zone: UTC+5:30 (IST)
- PIN: 628616
- Telephone code: 91-4639

Oyangudi is a small village situated near Nazareth in Thoothukudi District of Tamil Nadu, India. Nazareth is 2.5 km away from Oyangudi. There are about 200 families are living in this village. More than 250 houses are there in this village. It belongs to the Mukkuperi panchayet. A C.S.I Church (Holy Trinity Church) is located at the center of the village. An E.R.S Church is situated on the west side of main street. There are four streets are there in Oyangudi. They are West Street, East Street, North Street, and South Street. A post office located at the south street. A water tank is located on the east street. A road from Nazareth to Tiruchendur divides North part and South part. In the southern part a railway road is crossing from East to Westwardly from Tiruchendur to Tirunelveli.

== Geography ==
Oyangudi is situated near Nazareth of Thoothukudi district. On the north side it is surrounded by a big pool called 'Kadamba Kullam'. On the south side it is surrounded by a big forest called 'Theri' ( red Sand Area). Mukuperi is located on the west side of this village. On the east side Pattakarai is located.

== Demographics ==
Everybody in the village belongs the Nadar community. Christianity is the main religion followed (most of them C.S.I Christians and others E.R.S Christians).

The nearby cities are Tirunelveli (45 km) and Thoothukudi (47 km). The nearest railway stations are Nazareth (2.5 km) and Kachanavillai (3 km). The nearest harbor and airport is situated at Thoothukudi (47 km).

== Places of worship ==
- Holy Trinity Church, Oyangudi (CSI Thoothukudi-Nazareth Diocese, Oyangudi), and ERS Church, India Eka Rachaker Sbai
