= Margoschis Higher Secondary School =

School in Tamil Nadu, India

Coordinates: 8.559452°N 77.971317°E

Location
- SH 93; Nazareth, Tamil Nadu; Tamil Nadu, 628617; India

Information
- Motto: Learn, labour and be lighted
- Religious affiliation: Christian
- Founded: 1839
- Founder: John Ludovick Irion
- Education system: Tamil Nadu State Board syllabus
- Language: English, Tamil

Margoschis Higher Secondary School is located in Nazareth Tamil Nadu, India.

== History ==
In 1839, Rev. John Ludovick Irion, the first evangelist to do missionary work at Nazareth, Tamil Nadu, a small village to the eastern part of the Tirunelveli district, started a primary school with the aim of imparting education to the native children. In 1880, this Boys’ Primary School became a Higher Grade Middle School. And later, this school grew into an Anglo-Vernacular Middle School. In 1882, Rev. Margoschis started this Anglo-Vernacular Middle School. This school functioned in the Industrial school compound and became very popular among the villages around Nazareth. The boarding section attached to the primary school now known as Kasba Primary school founded by the famous Chaplain, Rev. James Hough in 1820 and was used as the centre for boys.

Margoschis started a non-vegetarian boarding section in 1884 in order to attract the caste Hindus. Fifteen Hindu boys joined the school immediately. The students taught Tamil, English, Hebrew and other subjects. In 1885, this school was awarded "The Best School" title in the Presidency of Madras. The school was upgraded to the status of a high school in 1889 by Margoschis.

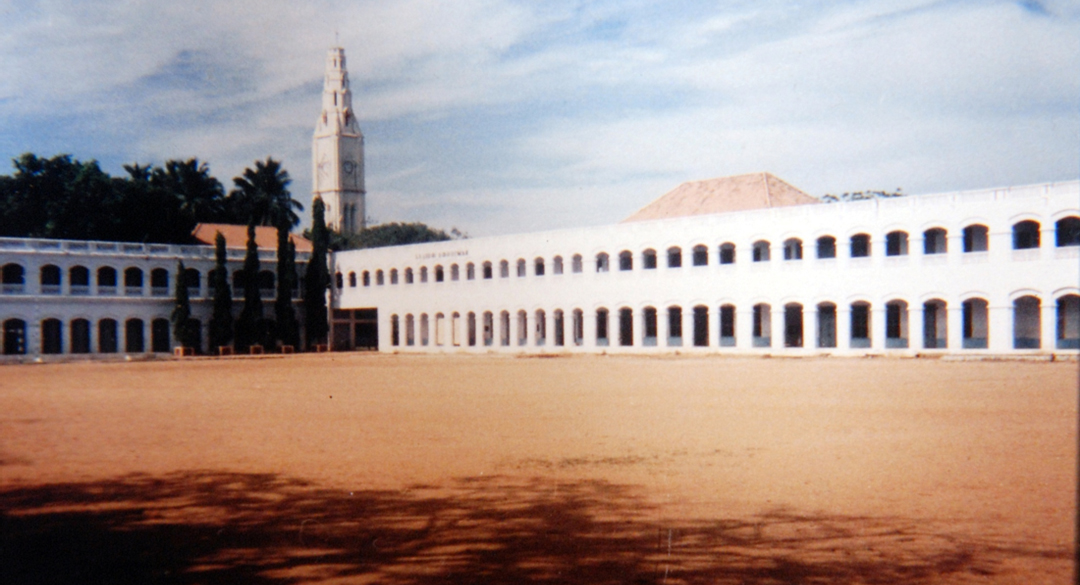
Margoschis HSS Nazareth

Robert Caldwell who had already started a high school at Sawyerpuram in 1862, considered the high school started by Margoschis, a rival school. Besides, the Madras Diocesan Committee of the S.P.G. had given permission to Margoschis to start the school ignoring Caldwell‟s protest and opposition. But Caldwell was very stubborn and he managed to get the school closed in 1892, leaving behind the Middle School for boys.

In 1929, new buildings were constructed and the classes were shifted from the industrial school premises. The people of Nazareth wanted a high school in their area. The Mission Circle Committee, Nazareth, took steps and sanctioned a good amount for this purpose. A committee appointed for the purpose was able to collect only Rs 4500/-. At this time Mr. M.S.Appadurai of Nazareth, almost gagged his own property and advanced the necessary amount as loan. After the payment of the required amount, the Boys Middle School was raised to the status of a high school in 1930.

The old boys of the school, as a tribute to the beloved visionary of the school, Rev. Arthur Margoschis, called the school after him. From 1941, Nazareth Boys High School was known as Margoschis Boys High School. Scouting, First Aid, Study Tours, Music Band, Folklore Dance, English and Tamil choir, and Literary and Debating Society were the extra-curricular activities of the school.

The school scored cent percent passes in S.S.L.C. examination of 1947. The average percentage of passes during the period 1938-1947 in the S.S.L.C. Examination was 74.3. When the new educational pattern of 10 +2 was introduced in Tamil Nadu, the school was upgraded into a Higher Secondary School in the year 1978.

Those days, Margoschis High School was one of the early schools for boys in East Tirunelveli serving the children of a very low socio-economic status. Most of the parents were illiterate. Nevertheless, the students were able to secure high ranks in the S.S.L.C. Examination. There are now more than 5000 teachers in the Diocesan Education of institutions. Many of them hail from Tirunelveli and Thoothukudi.

Nowadays, Nazareth Margoschis School is familiar in this area for its footballing prowess. It has nurtured and produced many India national team footballers line Samson Gunapandian, and I.Gandhi.

== Notable people ==
=== Alumni ===
- A. D. K. Jayaseelan (1945-)- former Member of Parliament from Tiruchendur.
- R. Stanley - Founder, Blessing Youth Mission
- Nirmal Selvamony (1953-), Tamil academic and ecocriticism.
- Dr. A. Jefferson Christopher - Former Headmaster (1992 - 2006) - M. C. C. Higher Secondary School, Chennai
- Dr. Immanuel Vincent (1992- 1999) - scientist, Inje University, South Korea.
- Dr. Samuel JK. Abraham (1983- 1986) - Physician-scientist, University of Yamanashi, Japan.
