= Kayalpattinam railway station =

Railway station in Tamil Nadu, India

Kayalpattinam
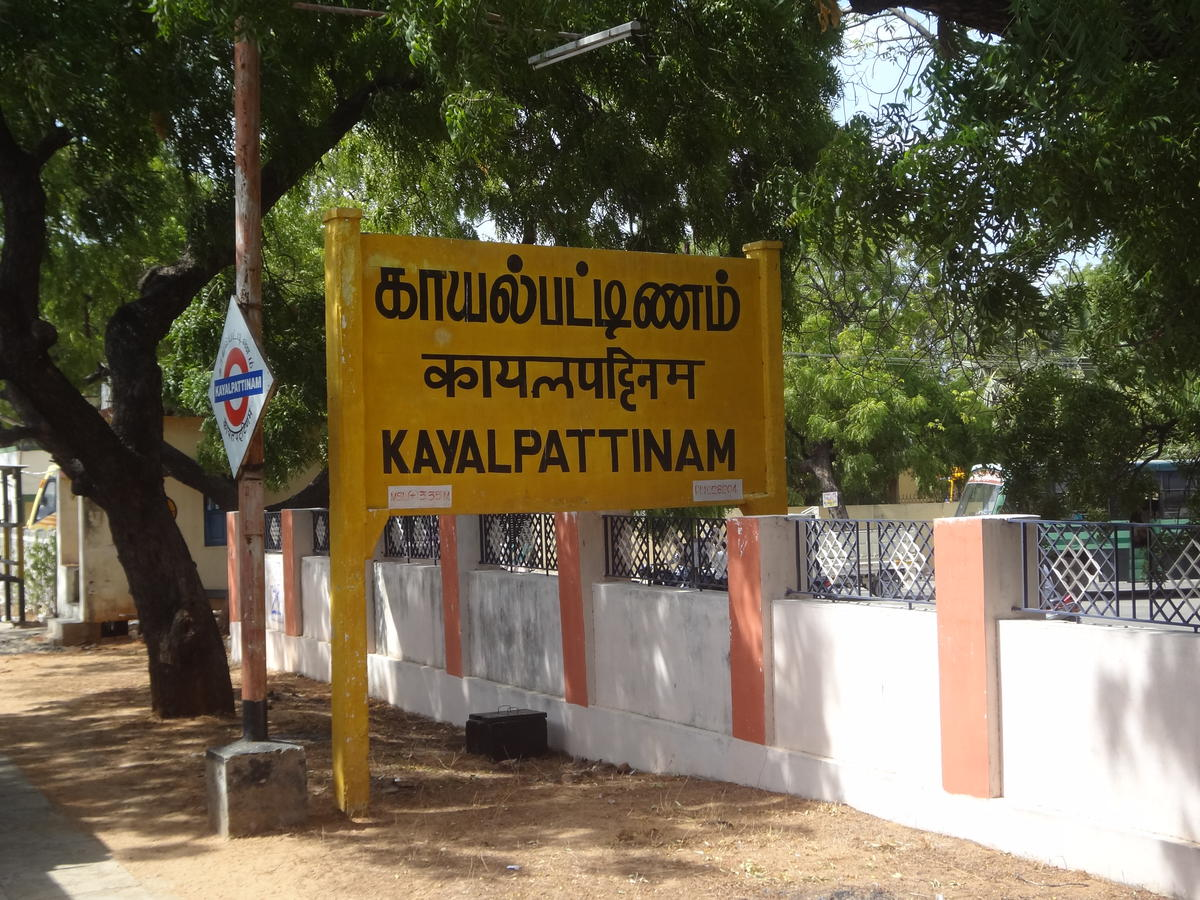
- Kayalpattinam station board

General information
- Location: L.F Road, Kayalpattinam, Thoothukudi district, Tamil Nadu
- Coordinates: 8°34′01″N 78°05′59″E
- Elevation: 7 m (23 ft)
- System: Express train, commuter rail and passenger train station
- Line: Tirunelveli–Tiruchendur branch line
- Platforms: 1
- Tracks: 1
- Connections: Auto rickshaws, bus

Construction
- Structure type: Standard on ground station
- Parking: Available
- Accessible: Disabled access

Other information
- Status: Functioning
- Station code: KZY
- Zone(s): Southern Railway zone
- Division(s): Madurai

History
- Opened: 1923; 103 years ago
- Rebuilt: 2009; 17 years ago
Route map
Location
- Location within Tamil Nadu

Kayalpattinam railway station is a station in Kayalpattinam, Thoothukudi district, in the state of Tamil Nadu, India. It belongs to the Madurai railway division. The Tirunelveli – Tiruchendhur railway line was laid and inaugurated by the British Indian government in 1923 mainly for raw materials export, This region is famous for salt production, in early days salt and sugar were major exports through this route. The 70 km meter gauge line was closed 2006 for gauge conversion and the broad gauge line was inaugurated in 2009. This section was electrified on 2022.

== Services ==
- Chendur Express is the only direct train from this station to Chennai
- Palakkad Junction–Tiruchendur Passenger (via Palani) (unreserved)
- Tirunelveli–Tiruchendur Passenger (unreserved)
- Tuticorin–Tiruchendur Passenger (unreserved)
