= Samson Gunapandian =

Indian footballer

Personal information
- Full name: Samson Gunapandian
- Place of birth: Nazareth, Tamil Nadu, India
- Place of death: Chennai, India
- Position: Defender

Senior career*
Years	Team	Apps	(Gls)
1971–1974	Reserve Bank of India		
1971–1974	Tamil Nadu		

International career
1971–1973	India		
- * Club domestic league appearances and goals

Samson Gunapandian was an Indian football player.

== Playing career ==
Born in Nazareth, Tamil Nadu, S.Gunapandian played for the Indian football national team. He represented India twice in the Merdeka Cup, in the year 1971 and 1973. He also played for India in the Singapore Pesta Sukan Cup in the year 1971. Apart from these two tournaments, he also played for India in the 1972 Munich Olympic Qualifiers.

Gunapandian was the captain of the Tamil Nadu state football team, which has reached the Santosh Trophy football final, in the year 1972. Tamil Nadu state football team played against the Bengal state football team, and lost the finals 4–1. It is considered as the Tamil Nadu football teams best ever performance in the Santosh Trophy by reaching the finals. Gunapandian also played for the Reserve Bank of India as a stopper.

Gunapandian, along with Gandhi (former Indian Defender, Tamil Nadu state football team captain, and RBI football player) studied in Margoschis Higher Secondary School, Nazareth, Tamil Nadu.
