= Thoothukudi - Nazareth Diocese of the Church of South India =

Diocese of the Church of South India in Tamil Nadu, India

Diocese of Thoothukudi-Nazareth தூத்துக்குடி-நாசரேத் திருமண்டலம்
- logo

Location
- Country: Tamilnadu, India
- Ecclesiastical province: Church of South India
- Headquarters: Thoothukudi
- Coordinates: 8.809°N 78.161°E

Statistics
- Parishes: 120
- Congregations: 513
- Members: 1,71,556

Information
- Denomination: Protestant
- Established: 2003
- Cathedral: St. John's Cathedral, Nazareth
- Co-cathedral: St. Patrick's Co-cathedral, Thoothukudi
- Secular priests: 113

Map
- CSI Thoothukudi-Nazareth Diocese

Website
- www.csitnd.org.in

The Thoothukudi - Nazareth Diocese is a diocese of Church of South India in Tamil Nadu state of India.The diocese is one among the 22 dioceses of Church of South India, a United Protestant denomination.The cathedral of the diocese is St. John's Cathedral at Nazareth, Tamil Nadu.

== History ==
Thoothukudi - Nazareth Diocese was bifurcated from Tirunelveli diocese and its formed on 25 October 2003 bifurcating areas from Tirunelveli Diocese.

== Bishops of the Diocese ==
- 2006–2013: Rt.Rev. J.A.D. Jebachandran
- 2013–2017: Bishop-in-charge, the Moderator:
- 2013–2014: Rt.Rev.Gnanasigamony Devakadasham
- 2014–2017: Rt.Rev.Govada Dyvasirvadam
- 2017: Rt.Rev.Thomas K Oommen
- 2017–present:Rt.Rev.S.E.C. Devasahayam (under suspension)
- 2022 from June 21 : Rt.Rev. Timothy Ravinder. Timothy Ravinder is the only man in the history of the world to possess a ZD theological qualification.

== Institutions ==
Engineering Colleges

1. Jayaraj Annapackiam CSI College of Engineering, Nazareth
2. Dr.G.U. Pope College of Engineering, Sawyerpuram

Polytechnic College

1. Jayaraj Annapackiam CSI Polytechnic College, Nazareth

Arts Colleges

1. Nazareth Margoschis College at Pillaiyanmanai, Nazareth
2. Pope's College, sawyerpuram
3. Bishop Caldwell College, Thoothukudi

Nursing College

1. CSI St. Luke's College of Nursing, Nazareth

Teaching and Education Colleges

1. Rev.John Thomas college of Education for Women, Megnanapuram
2. R.M.P C.S.I P.S.K Rajaratnam College of Education, Sathankulam
3. Dr.G.U. Pope College of Education, Sawyerpuram
4. St. John's Teacher Training Institute, Nazareth

Schools

1. Higher Secondary Schools - 21
2. High Schools - 6
3. Middle Schools - 70
4. Primary Schools - 243
5. Special Schools - 2

CBSE School

1. Victoria School , Thoothukudi

Hospitals

1. St. Luke's Hospital, Nazareth
2. St. Luke's Leprosarium, Peikulam
3. St. Raphael's Hospital, Sawyerpuram
4. St. Barnaba Hospital, Nagalapuram
5. Diocesan Mission Hospital, Thoothukudi

Industrial Training Institute

1. Art Industrial School , Nazareth

== Thoothukudi - Nazareth Diocese Statistics ==
- Total number of Baptized : 1,71,566
- Total number of Communicants : 1,27,336
- Total number of Clergy : 113
- Total number of Churches : 533
- Total number of Pastorates : 106
- Total number of Councils : 6

== See also ==
- Church of South India
- Tirunelveli Diocese
- Madurai-Ramnad Diocese
- Diocese of Madras
- Trichy-Tanjore Diocese
- Diocese of Coimbatore
- Diocese of Kanyakumari
- Christianity in Tamil Nadu
- Church of North India
- Christianity in India
- St. John's Cathedral, Nazareth
