= Pragasapuram =

- Subvillage/hamlet
- State: Tamil Nadu
- District: Thoothukudi district

Government
  - Type: Nazareth Panchayat

Population
  - Total: >5,000

Languages
  - Official: Tamil
- Time zone: UTC+5:30 (IST)
- Postal code: 628 616
- Vehicle registration: TN 69

Pragasapuram is a sub-village adjacent to Nazareth and Mukuperi in the Thoothukudi district of Tamil Nadu, India. The Tirunelveli-Tiruchendur Railway Line divides the villages of Pragasapuram and Nazareth. Pragasapuam is included under Nazareth Village for Revenue and Land administration, but the Mukuperi Post Office provides postal service. Pragasapuram and Mukuperi are on the northern border of Therikaadu and Nazareth is on the northwestern border. It is surrounded by trees, lakes and paddy fields.

Pragasapuram is a village located in the Tuticorin district, between Nazareth and Mukuperi. The Tirunelveli-Tiruchendur railway line divides Nazareth and Pragasapuram. The village is near the Kuthiraimozhi Theri, an area known as the "Desert of Tamil Nadu."

Initially, Pragasapuram was called "Pudur" (New Village). Because of its proximity to Nazareth (Saanpaththu), it was known as "Saanpaththu Pudur." In 1831, the name was officially changed to Pragasapuram, meaning "City of Light," and it has been known by that name ever since.

== Climate ==
The climate of Pragasapuram is usually dry and windy, but there is a short rainy season.

== Education ==
Pragasapuram has three schools: St. Mary's Middle School, St. Trinity Church Middle School and James Memorial Matriculation Higher Secondary School. The literacy rate is above 96%

== Religion ==
Pragasapuram is mostly populated with Christians and Hindus. It has five churches, Our Lady of Assumption Church (Catholic), St. Trinity Church (Protestant), Church of the Only Saviour (ERS), a Seventh-day Adventist church and a Pentecost Church, and two Hindu temples. More than 80% of the population are Christians.

== Festivals ==
The Catholic Church's annual feast runs from 6 August to 15 August every year. Many people from Nazareth, Mukuperi and other surrounding areas celebrate the St. Mary's festival. They provide food (Samabanthi) for all people thrice a year.

The CSI Church gives Samabanthi once a year during their Church dedication remembrance ceremony. The ERS and SDA churches also celebrate their yearly dedication festival with free food. The ERS Church follows mostly the Old Testament of the Bible with a Saturday Sabbath and Jewish traditions including Passover.
