= Pannaivilai =

- village
- Location in Tamil Nadu, India Pannaivilai (India)
- Coordinates: 8.652878°N 78.000909°E
- Country: India
- State: Tamil Nadu
- District: Tuticorin

Population
  - Total: 2,500

Languages
  - Official: Tamil
- Time zone: UTC+5:30 (IST)
- PIN: 628751
- Telephone code: 91-4630
- Vehicle registration: TN92
- Eral: Eral
- Srivaikuntam constituency: Tuticorin
- Tuticorin constituency: Srivaikuntam
- Climate: Cool (Köppen)
- Website: www.pannaivilai.org

Pannaivilai is a small village covered by Palmyra trees in Tuticorin District, Tamil Nadu, India. The name Pannai Villai is derived from two Tamil words, Pannai and Villai, which literally mean “land which grows” or “has Palmyra trees.”

== Geography ==
Pannaivilai is situated near Eral of Thoothukudi district. On the north side it is surrounded by a big pool called 'Perungulam'.

== Demographics ==
Everybody in the village belongs the Nadar community. Christianity is the main religion followed.

The nearby cities are Tirunelveli (47 km) and Thoothukudi (45 km). The nearest railway stations are Nazareth (25 km) and Kurumbur (13 km). The nearest harbor and airport is situated at Thoothukudi (30 km). Airport Vagaikulam 14 Km

== Places of worship ==
- Holy Trinity Church, Pannaivilai (CSI Thoothukudi-Nazareth Diocese, Pannaivilai)

== Landmark ==
Pannaivilai puthur is situated on the East of Pannaivilai, on the West is Perungulam Lake, Pandaravilai, Mannarayanthattu, on the South Pannaivilai Bungalow, Perungulam village (Town Panchayat) Eral and on the North is Kombukaranpottal, Nattathi and Sawyerpuram. Pannaivilai is 23 km south of Tuticorin, (District Headquarters) Tuticorin is mainly famous for salt manufacturing, shipping etc.,

== Information ==
- Police Station Limit: Eral
- Near Railway Station: Tuticorin / Kurumbur / Tirunelveli / Tiruchendur
- Near Airport: Tuticorin / Madurai / Trivandrum
