= St. John's Girls Higher Secondary School =

Higher Secondary School in Nazareth, Tamil Nadu, India

Coordinates: 8.558818°N 77.969765°E

St. John's Girls' Higher Secondary School

Location
- No 63, Margoschis Road; Nazareth, Tamil Nadu; Tamil Nadu, 628617; India

Information
- Motto: To Love is to serve
- Religious affiliation: Christian
- Founded: 1843; 183 years ago
- Founder: Ann Caemmerer
- Education system: Tamil Nadu State Board syllabus
- Language: English, Tamil

St. John's Girls' Higher Secondary School is located in Nazareth, Tamil Nadu, India.

== History ==
Rev. James Hough, also Chaplain of the East India Company, at Palamcottah, started a girls school at Nazareth in the year 1819, and in the year 1826, this school was closed due to financial constraints.

There are many Christian missionaries who have been stationed and worked at Nazareth, Tamil Nadu. In that way, Rev. Augustus Frederick Caemmerer and his wife Ann Caemmerer have contributed their part to this small village called Nazareth. When they began, the missionaries met with much opposition from the natives of Nazareth. In order to collect students for the new school, Ann Caemmerer went from house to house. spoke kindly to the parents, offered gifts to them and stressed the need for female education. Thus this Girls School called St. Johns Girls primary School was started in the year 1843, by Ann Caemmerer, at Nazareth. Ann Caemmerer is the daughter of Rev. Charles Mead, a LMS Missionary to Travancore.

Mrs. Ann Caemmerer was the first principal of this school. She died on 15 September 1849 at the early age of 28. After the death of Ann Caemmerer, Mrs. Sarah Scarbarough took charge of the St. John's Girls' primary school, and during her time, the school was upgraded to a middle school. Later, women missionaries like Anne Brotherton, and Harriet Strachan also took control of this school one after the other. In the year 1876, Rev. Margoschis was made superintendent of this school. This school attained the high school status in the year 1886, but was only able to full-fledgedly operate as a high school in the year 1888. St. John's Girls’ High School at Nazareth, is considered as the first Girls High School in South India.

Ms. Groves, Ms. Herring, Ms. Neadham, Ms. Davidson, Mrs. Harries, Ms. Macdonald, Ms. Green, Ms. Marks, Ms. L.M. Evans, Ms. Rix, and Ms. E.M. Swingler served as teachers in the school. After Arthur Margoschis, Rev. Weston was in-charge of this school. St. John's Teacher Training Institute, which was started in the year 1877 by Arthur Margoschis is located inside St. John's Girls' higher secondary school premises. A chapel inside the school premises was built by the efforts of Rev. G.T. Selwyn in the year 1939.

After Independence, When the 10+2 pattern of education introduced by the Government of Tamil Nadu in the year 1978, the school was upgraded to Higher Secondary School.

== Notable people ==
=== Alumni ===
- Dr. Kamali Jeyaseelan - St. Luke's Hospital at Nazareth and wife of Dr. A.D.K. Jayaseelan - Former Member of Parliament, India.
- Angela Lincy Vasanthakumari - Former Indian Women's High Jump National record holder.

== See also ==
- தூய யோவான் மகளிர் மேல் நிலைப்பள்ளி, நாசரேத்
