= J.A.D. Jebachandran =

CSI bishop

The Right Reverend J.A.D. Jebachandran
- Bishop of Thoothukudi - Nazareth
- Church: Church of South India
- Diocese: Thoothukudi - Nazareth
- Installed: 2006
- Successor: Gnanasigamony Devakadasham

J.A.D. Jebachandran was the inaugural Bishop of Thoothukudi - Nazareth, serving from 2006 to 2013.
