= St. John's Cathedral, Nazareth =

St. John's Cathedral
- St. John's Cathedral
- 8.560715°N 77.971978°E
- Location: Nazareth, Tamil Nadu
- Country: India
- Denomination: Church of South India
- Previous denomination: Church of England
- Website: www.stjohnscathedralnazareth.org

History
- Status: Cathedral
- Consecrated: 2013

Architecture
- Functional status: Active
- Architectural type: Cathedral
- Style: Gothic
- Completed: 1928

Clergy
- Bishop: Timothy Ravinder

St. John's Cathedral is the cathedral of the Thoothukudi - Nazareth Diocese of the Church of South India.

== History ==
In 1803, a site of a village was purchased by the Rev. J.C. Kohloff, S.P.C.K. missionary. The same year, that village by the name "Shanpathu" with 8 families became Christians, through Rev. Sathyanathan. Its revenue extent is 7 sq. miles. The first church, a thatched building with palmyrah leaves, was built in 1803 and named as St. John’s church. In 1805, the place name was changed to Nazareth.

In the year 1829, Rev. David Rosen laid the foundation for the Nazareth church and in the following year 1830, the second church was built by Rev. Adaikalam. This church was erected under the supervision of Rev. David Rosen. At the time of Arthur Margoschis at Nazareth, on his part, he revamped the church. He extended the back portion of the church. Also, Arthur Margoschis planned to build a new big church, but that plan could not be fulfilled during his time.

It was during the time of Rev. C.S.Stapley (1911 - 1924) at Nazareth, foundation and developments for a new church were initiated. In June 1920, the old church was demolished and a foundation was laid for a new church by Rt. Rev. E.H.M. Waller, Bishop in Tinnevelly. For that time, till the completion of the new church, a temporary church was built in front of the present day church.

In the year 1924, Rev. C.S. Stapley, the then Presbyter and missionary was transferred, and the charge was handed over to Rev. Canon D. Koilpillai. Koilpillai was the first Indian Presbyter in the history of the S.P.G. Mission. After taking charge, Rev. Canon D.Koilpillai has built this new church. The church was dedicated by Rt. Rev. Norman H. Tubbs, Bishop of Tinnevelly, in the year 1928. The S.P.G. funds helped to build this church. Natives of Nazareth, on their part, came forward to fund Rs. 20,000 to build this church. During the period of Rev. John Samuel (1936-1940), the church tower was completely built. The church tower height exactly 200 feet. The interlude between the formation of the Diocese in 1924 and the formation of the Church of South India in 1947 saw some distinct developments in the life of the church.

== Cathedral ==
After the increase of various institutions and revenue at Nazareth, its members felt that it is necessary to get bifurcated or trifurcated from the Tirunelvelli Diocese. The C.S.I. Synod has accepted the request of Nazareth and bifurcation was ordered to form Tuticorin-Nazareth Diocese from out of Tirunelvelli Diocese. The celestial ceremony was conducted on 25 October 2003 forming of a New Diocese and St. John's church was elevated to the position of Cathedral of Tuticorin-Nazareth Diocese since 23 October 2003. The ceremony was conducted by the then Moderator of C.S.I, Rt. Rev. Dr K.J. Samuel in the presence of Moderator Commissionary of Tuticorin-Nazareth Diocese, Rt. Rev. Dt. J.W. Gladston.

== Relic ==
The church has 12 Relic features. They are:

1. Doors – Three sides of the Church are provided with 5 entrances, as a symbol of welcoming all into the church from all sides.
2. Baptism tub - Baptistery has been put up at the main entrance of the Church so that it is open to accept everyone as a member of the Church. An adult baptism (immerse)tub has been provided within a campus of the church. And as initial 50 members were baptised in this tub.
3. The Floor (Nave) – Marvellous flooring has been beautifully laid throughout the church.
4. Litany Desk – There is a litany Desk, provided in front of the congregation. It is used at the time of Praying Litany.
5. The Lectern – Bronze made lectern is beautifully provided in the shape of an eagle’s legs showering as its foot-rest.
6. Pulpit – The majestic pulpit is located at the centre of the church in a nominal height so that the entire congregation can see the preacher face to face from all the sides of the church.
7. Altar – The most special feature of the church is the Altar with its curtain. It reminds us of the verse in Isaiah 6:1 "His robe filled with whole of the Temple". Besides there are four glass stained pictures at the backside of the altar, which symbolically means the four Gospels in the Bible. The first one portrays the birth of Jesus Christ, The second shows St. John leaning on the chest of Jesus. The third picture depicts the last supper of Jesus Christ. The fourth picture vividly represents how Jesus was taken up to heaven. Different coloured Altar table cloths and screens and robes of the priests are being used to show the different Days of Service.
8. Cross – It is beautifully located at the centre top of the Altar. It reminds Jesus's Crucification. The pedestal of the cross on the Altar table consists of three steps which symbolize Faith, Hope, and Love and also the sacrifice of the Lord,
9. Candle & Candle Sticks – The candles with seven sticks are burning on the two sides of the cross. This indicates the seven gifts of the Holy Sprit, Wisdom, Understanding, Counsel, Fortitude, Knowledge, True Godliness and the fear of the Lord.
10. Organ with Benches for the Choir – The Choir used to carry three types of crosses during their services. One cross during the regular service and other two with Banner are used during festivals and Saints’ days.
11. Sanctuary Lamps – Seven lamps hanging inside from both sides of the Altar are being provided, and at the centre of the Altar there is a lamp burning all the hours day and night throughout the year.
12. The Symbols – All types of symbols as traditional relics are seen in all the parts of the church, The sign XPICTOC or IHC (The first two letters of the word Christ in Greek), IHCOYC (the first three letters of the word Jesus in Greek), INRI ( the word as Jesus the Nazarene, the King of Jews in Latin JESUS NAZARENUS REX JUDAEORUM), the letters as Alpha & Omega, Star of David, etc.

Other salient features in this church are, The Pillars - The magnificent pillars towering without clench and supporting the roof, The church's portico which is floored with ornamental roof, The Stratum & Clock - The church tower has 7 stratums at the height of 200 feet, having clocks in four sides and neon cross lights. At the top, there is a neon cross light.

== Festivals ==
The church congregation celebrates the following five festivals in grand manner:

1. New Year
2. Easter
3. Day of Church Dedication
4. All Souls' Day & All Saints' Day
5. Christmas

== Bishops of the Diocese ==
1. Rt. Rev. Dr. J.A.D. Jebachandran(2006-2013)
2. Rt. Rev. Dr. S.E.C. Devasahayam(2017-2020)
