= St. Luke's Hospital, Nazareth =

Geography
- Location: Nazareth, Tamil Nadu, India
- Coordinates: 8.5585°N 77.9702°E

Organisation
- Type: Private

History
- Founded: 1870

Links
- Website: www.nazarethlukes.org
- Lists: Hospitals in India

St. Luke's Hospital is a private, Christian, minority-run hospital in Nazareth, Tamil Nadu, India. It is administered by the C.S.I. Thoothukudi–Nazareth Diocese.

== History ==
The hospital was established in 1870 by the first qualified doctor of Christian Mission in India, Rev. Dr. J. M. Strachan MD. of Edinburgh, Scotland, a S.P.G. missionary dedicated to serving the poor and needy. Dr. Strachan worked in various parts of South India before opening the full-time regular medical mission at Nazareth.

Later on, Strachan was appointed as the Secretary of the Madras Diocesan Committee of S.P.G. (1874-1879) and then as Bishop of Rangoon in the year 1882. The hospital's administration was assumed by doctor and surgeon Rev. Arthur Margoschis, who christened the hospital with its present name on St. Luke's Day, 18 October 1892. Margoschis attended the hospital for two hours each day. A fee of one penny was charged for medicine and advice.
