= Our Lady of Assumption Church, Pragasapuram =

- பரிசுத்த பரலோக அன்னை ஆலயம், பிரகாசபுரம்
- Our Lady of Assumption Church, Pragasapuram
- 8.56704°N 77.98218°E
- Location: Pragasapuram, Tuticorin district, Tamil Nadu, India
- Country: India
- Denomination: Catholic Church

History
- Founded: 15th August 1880
- Dedication: Assumption of Mary

Architecture
- Functional status: Active

Administration
- Diocese: Roman Catholic Diocese of Tuticorin

Clergy
- Priest: Fr. Arokiya Amalraj

Our Lady of Assumption Church is a Roman Catholic church in Pragasapuram, India.

== 18th Century ==
The Catholic ancestors of this land accepted the Blessed Virgin Mary, the Mother of God, as their patroness. To honor her Assumption into Heaven, they built churches in her name.

Based on this devotion,Two large churches were built: one in the north at Kamanayakkanpatti and another in the south at Vadakankulam. To serve as a central point between these two villages, a new church was built in Pragasapuram in the 18th century. This first church had a thatched roof (a "Koorai Kovil"). The site of this old thatched church is where the "Centenary Grotto" (Madha Kebi) now stands in the center of the village.

== Foundation and early development (1880–1890) ==
In 1880, the 14 Catholic families of the village replaced the thatched roof of the church with tiles. The Church of Our Lady of Assumption, Pragasapuram was formally established and dedicated on August 15, 1880, during the Feast of the Assumption, by Rev. Fr. Dionysius Guchen. Regular Mass and Rosary prayers were held during feast days. To further strengthen the faith of the community, Fr. Dionysius Guchen arranged for three holy statues (Siroobam) to be brought by ship from Sri Lanka: one of Our Lady of Assumption, one of St. Joseph, and one of the Infant Jesus. These arrived in Tuticorin and were brought to Pragasapuram, which was then a sub-station of the Sathankulam parish. In 1887, the Bishop of Trichy, Most Rev. Barthome, visited Sathankulam. Impressed by the devotion of the people of Pragasapuram, he ordered that it be made an independent parish. It was separated from Sathankulam and entrusted to Rev. Fr. Nicholas. The parish served as the mother church for 15 sub-stations, including large towns like Srivaikundam, Sethukuvaaithaan, and Chinthamani.

== Parish growth and traditions (1890–1913) ==
Until 1895, the annual feast (Thiruvizha) was a simple celebration. After that, it began to include a procession with carriages (called "Chapparam"). Three chapparam, for St. Michael, St. Antony, and St. Joseph, would be carried through the streets. On the 9th and 10th days of the feast, the carriage (Chapparam) of Our Lady of Assumption, the "Queen of Miracles," would join the procession. Historical records from the Madurai Mission note that these processions were conducted despite strong opposition from some protestants. In 1907, the "Father of Nazareth," Canon Margoschis, who was ill and bedridden, donated three statues from his personal Prayer Room: a statue of the Jesus Christ in Cross, the Blessed Virgin Mary, and the Risen Lord. These were brought in a procession to the Pragasapuram church. Although declared an independent parish in 1887, it began functioning formally only from the end of January 1909. The first parish priest was Rev. Fr. E. Mass, a Jesuit priest. A significant tradition was the erecting of flag pole ("Kodimaram") during the feast. A flag pole made of succulent wood with mango leaves and tender palm leaves would be erected in the RC compound. The raising and lowering of the flags were major ceremonial events, celebrated grandly by all villagers and religion. The church feast became, and still is, a major event uniting over 20 neighboring villages. In 1913, during the tenure of Rev. Fr. T. Michael, two important developments occurred: the tradition of providing free meals ("Asanam") began in the church, considering the poverty of the people. Secondly, the foundation stone was laid for a new church building.

== New Church Construction and consecration (1913–1967) ==
In 1913 the foundation stone was laid for a new church building (the current Church of Our Lady of Assumption). Worship continued in the old church until the new one was built. To educate the children of the region, a primary school (grades 1-5) named St. Mary's Primary School was started in the village in 1929. It was upgraded to a Middle School (up to grade 8) in 1939. The school was located where St. Mary's Mahal now stands. Other traditions included distributing free palm juice ("Pathaneer") on Good Friday at a place called "Dharma valaagam" south of the old church. A bell hung in a tin tower opposite the old church served as the call to worship. Between 1931 and 1940, the practice of Eucharistic Processions began in the parish. The construction of the new church, which had stalled after the foundation was laid, resumed in 1949. Funds were raised by selling goods like wheat, beaten rice, and milk powder brought from Sri Lanka. The physical labor of the parishioners was immense. A grinding mill ("Chekku") was used to mix lime and soil for mortar; this mill can still be seen on the church premises today. Through the efforts of the then parish priest, Rev. Fr. Lourdu, the inner and outer walls of the church were completed by 1954. Work halted again due to his ill health. A plan to build a concrete dome over the altar was abandoned due to a famine and resulting fund shortage. After a delay of about 10 years, due to urgency, the roof was completed with asbestos sheets instead of concrete. The new church was finally completed through 54 years of hard work by the ancestors and the prayers of former parish priests. It was blessed and dedicated on November 21, 1967, by Most Rev.Fr.Thomas Fernando, the Bishop of Tuticorin, in the presence of Rev. Fr. G. Francis.

== Expansion and modernization (1968–1999) ==
Following its consecration, the parish focused on expansion and modernization. A bell tower was constructed near the church (north side). The bell was donated by V. C. Maria Michael Nadar and his wife Mrs. Maria Sundaram, who were honored as the Godfather and Godmother of the bell. A large permanent stage, known as the "Eucharistic Pavilion" (Narkarunai Pandhal), was built south of the flag pole for Eucharistic adoration during processions. This stage was removed after the new church was built. In the 1977, a tragic incident occurred during the feast: the carriage of Our Lady was damaged after hitting an electric wire. The statue was immediately moved to St. Joseph's carriage, and the procession continued. This event led the then parish priest, Rev. Fr. Cruz Marian, to decide on building a large church car ("Ther"). This new car, with the statue of Our Lady in the center flanked by St. Joseph and St. Antony, was blessed on August 15, 1978. Since then, the "Ther" procession, where devotees pull the car with ropes, has become a tradition. To commemorate the centenary of the old church (1880-1980) and preserve its memory, the then parish priest, Rev. Fr. Packiaraj M. Raja, built a grotto (Kebi) on the exact site. This "Centenary Grotto" (Nootraandu Kebi) was blessed on August 11, 1983. In 1992, on the occasion of the new church's 25th Silver Jubilee, the altars of Our Lady of Assumption and St. Joseph were renovated. A new building for St.Mary's Middle School was constructed. The foundation stone was laid by Rev. Fr. Edward J., and the building was completed and inaugurated on June 17, 1995, under the leadership of the then Apostolic Administrator of Tuticorin Diocese, Most Rev. Fr. Peter Fernando. In 1999, a series of deaths in the village created fear among the people. Seeking divine protection, they built a grotto dedicated to St. Michael the Archangel in the RC compound, opposite the flag mast and near the "Ther" shed. It was blessed and opened on August 14, 1999, by Rev. Fr. M. Thomas. A meal offering ("Asanam") has been held there every year on September 29, the feast of St. Michael.

== Renovation and infrastructure development (2000–2019) ==
The early 21st century was a period of significant renovation and development. Under Rev. Fr. Jackson, the church floor was renovated with marble. The main altar, the side altars, the area holding the crucifix, and the nave were all refurbished. A new grotto for Our Lady of Health was built in front of the church by the main road. All these were blessed on August 14, 2004. In 2005, the traditional flag pole broke during the hoisting ceremony. Rev. Fr. Jackson immediately arranged for a new, permanent iron flag pole, which has been in use since August 6, 2006. Efforts to build a parish hall, St. Mary's Mahal, had stalled. Rev. Fr. A. S. Raja, who became the parish priest, managed to construct the first floor amidst many difficulties. As the old church and its grotto had been demolished for this construction, there was a strong desire to build a new grotto. A new "Centenary Grotto" (Nootraandu Kebi) was built to mark the 25th year of the original one. It was blessed by Rev. Fr. A. S. Raja on August 14, 2007. His successor, Rev. Fr. P. K. Antony Douglas, worked tirelessly to complete St. Mary's Mahal. It was blessed and inaugurated on August 15, 2013, by the then Bishop of Tuticorin, Most Rev. Dr. Yvon Ambrose. A grotto dedicated to St. Anthony was built on the site of the old church. Its foundation was laid by the late Rev. Fr. Peter on November 4, 2012, and it was completed and blessed by the then parish priest, Rev. Fr. Arul Prabhakar, on November 21, 2016. In 2017, to celebrate the 50th Golden Jubilee of the new church (1967-2017) and the 40th anniversary of the church car - Ther (1978-2017), the car was heightened, renovated, and blessed by the then parish priest, Rev. Fr. Anthony Irudhaya Thomas. It was then taken in a grand procession. As the old parish priest's residence was beyond repair, a new residence was constructed. The foundation stone was laid by Rev. Fr. Packiaraj M. Raja on June 17, 2018. The main gate was blessed by former Bishop Most Rev. Dr. Yvon Ambrose on August 15, 2018, and the entire building was blessed and opened by the Bishop of Tuticorin, Most Rev. Fr. Stephen, on the Feast of the Immaculate Heart of Mary, June 29, 2019.

== Recent additions (2020–present) ==
The most recent addition to the parish is the Rosary Park. Its foundation stone was laid by Rev. Fr. D. Salet Jerald on October 2, 2022. The completed park was officially inaugurated and blessed by the Bishop of Tuticorin, Most Rev. Fr. Stephen, on August 15, 2024.

== வெளி இணைப்புகள் ==
- Our Lady of Assumption Church, Pragasapuram — அதிகாரப்பூர்வ இணையதளம்
