= Art Industrial School =

Coordinates: 8.557729°N 77.972106°E

- Motto: Not somehow, But Triumphantly
- Type: Training College
- Established: 1878
- Founders: Arthur Margoschis
- Affiliations: Directorate General of Training - Ministry of Skill Development and Entrepreneurship
- Religious affiliation: Christian
- Location: Camerar Street, Nazareth, Tamil Nadu, 628617, India
- Campus: Rural
- Website: artindustrialschooliti.com

Art Industrial School is located in Nazareth, Tamil Nadu, India. It is a private Industrial Training Institute (I.T.I.).

== History ==
In the year 1877, there was a severe famine at the erstwhile Tinnevelly District. Thousands of people died. Consequently, there were a large number of destitute orphan children who were left without their parents. Hence to provide food and shelter to these orphans, an orphanage was started by Arthur Margoschis in the year 1878, which later became "Art and Industrial School". This orphanage was named as St. John's Orphanage. Rev. Margoschis was supported by the Society for the Propagation of the Gospel (Dursley Branch) and the Indian Famine Orphan Fund. Mr. D. Koilpillai was appointed as the first Head Master of this institution. The aim of this institution was not only to teach reading, writing, and arithmetic, but to teach each child in the orphanage some industrial work, so that when they leave the orphanage they may earn their livelihood.

Initiated with formal school system up to III'rd standard, this institution accommodated other vocational trades such as Gardening, Tailoring and Carpentry with a view to ensure a livelihood for the inmates. Clothes for all the orphan children who were studying at the Industrial school and boarding schools at Nazareth were weaved at this S.P.G. Art Industrial School and was sent to them. Grant was sanctioned for the new Buildings for which plan and estimate were submitted to Government in 1886 and construction of the new buildings was commenced in January 1887. They were completed and opened on 14 November 1887 in a ceremonious function. In 1898, Mr. E. Hogg was appointed as Head master. In the year 1900, the orphanage grew up to accommodate 283 inmates and the Art Industrial School offered technical training in 18 trades. These included Carving, Carpentry, Masonry, Blacksmithy, Spinning, Weaving, Dyeing, Lace Making, Embroidery, Stitch-craft and such as those relevant to self-employed. In the year 1965, the name ORPHANAGE was changed to HOME FOR CHILDREN.

After Arthur Margoschis died in the year 1908, Rev. C.W. Weston took charge of this Industrial School at Nazareth. He wrote articles about this SPG industrial school like Industrial Missionary work in India and Trade schools as a mission asset. His wife, Mrs. Weston was in-charge of the Nazareth hospital, and the couple went home in the year 1913.

At present, this ITI offers different training courses on Fitter, Turner, Tool & Die Maker, Tailoring, Fitting and Blacksmithy, Carpentry and Cabinet Making, Data Entry Operator, Web Designing and Visual programming, and Four Wheeler Mechanism.
