= Tirunelveli–Tiruchendur line =

Railway line in Tamil Nadu, India

Tirunelveli - Tiruchendur Railway line
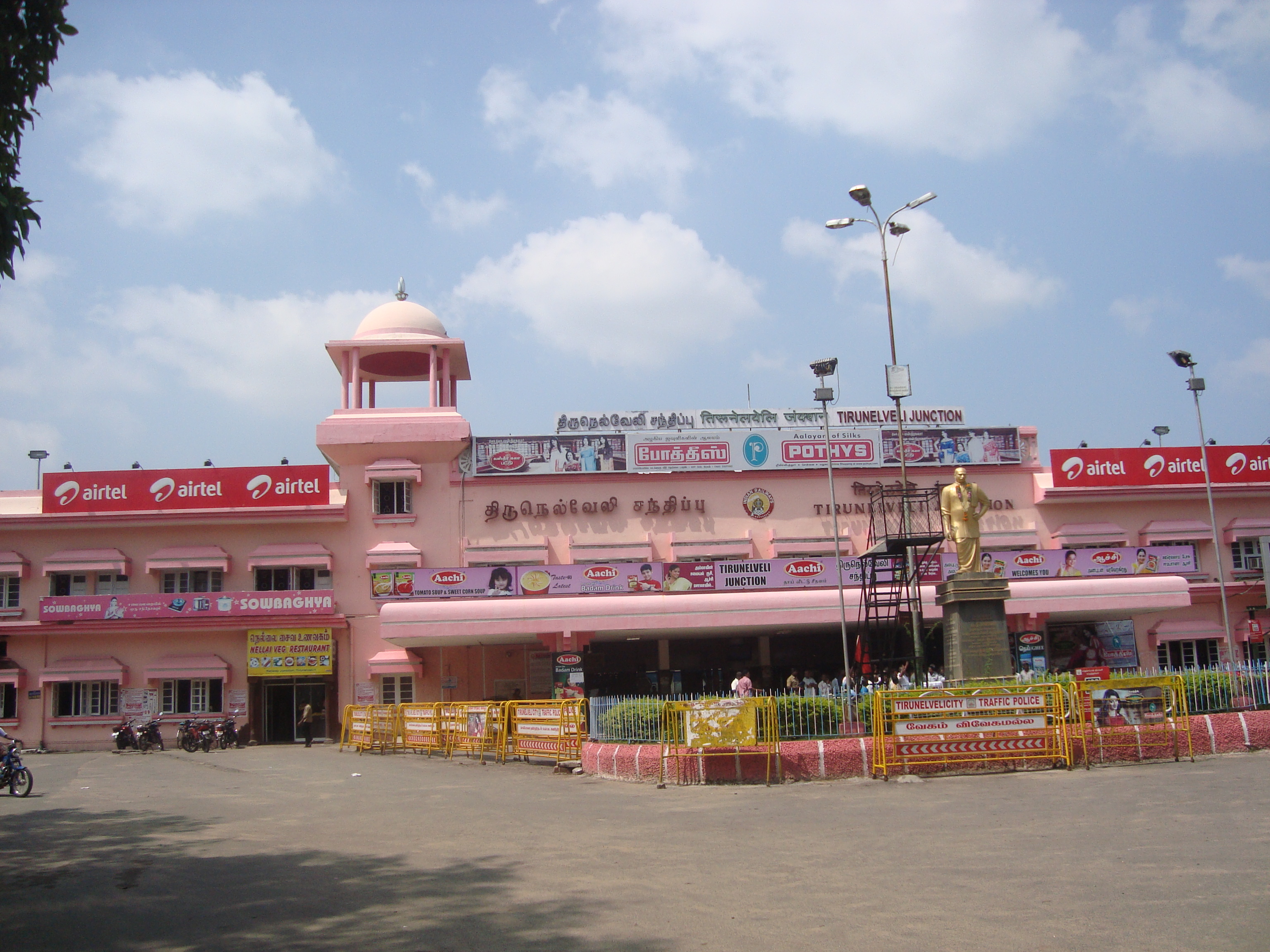
- Tirunelveli Junction railway station

Overview
- Native name: திருநெல்வேலி - திருச்செந்தூர் இருப்புப்பாதை
- Status: Operational
- Owner: Southern Railway zone
- Locale: Tamilnadu
- Termini: Tirunelveli Junction (TEN); Tiruchendur (TCN)
- Stations: 12
- Website: Southern Railway

Service
- Type: Regional rail Light rail
- System: Electrified
- Services: 1
- Operator(s): Madurai
- Rolling stock: WAP-4, WAP-7

History
- Opened: 1923; 102 years ago

Technical
- Line length: 60 kilometres (37 mi)
- Number of tracks: 1
- Track gauge: 1,676 mm (5 ft 6 in)
- Electrification: Overhead catenary
- Operating speed: 110 kilometres per hour (68 mph)

The Tirunelveli –Tiruchendur line connects the cities of Tirunelveli and Tiruchendur in the state of Tamil Nadu in Southern Railway zone. The line was opened in February 1923 as metre-gauge line by South Indian Railway.

== History ==
The construction of the line was proposed in 1903 and was sanctioned for construction by South Indian Railway for Tinnelvely District Board. The line was constructed to ferry men and materials from Tiruchendur region. The line was opened as a metre-gauge line on 23 February 1923. The line was upgraded into broad-gauge line and was opened on 27 September 2008.

=== Timeline ===
- 1903 — Proposal of construction of the line
- 1915 — Sanctioned for construction of Railway line by South Indian railway
- 1923 — The line was opened
- 2008 — The metre-gauge line was converted into Broad Gauge line and reopened
- 2023 — The broad-gauge line was electrified and first electric locomotive hauled train ran in the line

== Stations ==
S.No	Station	Station Code	Category
1	Tirunelveli	TEN	NSG 3
2	Palayamkottai	PCO	NSG 6
3	Seydunganallur	SDNR	NSG 6
4	Thathankulam	TTQ	NSG 6
5	Srivaikuntam	SVV	NSG 6
6	Alwar Thirunagari	AWT	NSG 6
7	Nazareth	NZT	NSG 5
8	Kachchanavilai	KCHV	NSG 6
9	Kurumbur	KZB	NSG 6
10	Arumuganeri	ANY	NSG 6
11	Kayalpatttinam	KZY	NSG 6
12	Tiruchendur	TCN	NSG 4
