= Nazareth, Tamil Nadu =

Nazareth Therku Mudalur
- Town
- Location in Tamil Nadu, India Nazareth (India)
- Coordinates: 8.558°N 77.960°E
- Country: India
- State: Tamil Nadu
- District: Tuticorin
- Founder: Canon Arthur Margoschis

Government
  - Type: Town Panchayat

Area
  - Total: 12.98 km^{2} (5.01 sq mi)

Population
  - Total: 24,815
  - Density: 1,912/km^{2} (4,952/sq mi)

Languages
  - Official: Tamil
- Time zone: UTC+5:30 (IST)
- PIN: 628617
- Vehicle registration: TN-92
- Nearest city: Tirunelveli

Nazareth is a town in the Thoothukudi district in the Indian state of Tamil Nadu.

== Geography ==
Nazareth is situated near the southern tip of the country. It was named by early Christian missionaries in memory of the city of Nazareth, Israel, where Jesus Christ spent his early days. There is a 100+ -year-old church (St. John's Cathedral) in the centre of the town. It has a tall tower with a flat top. This part of Southern Tamil Nadu has many Gothic-styled churches.

Nazareth is in Thoothukudi district. It is about 50 km from Thoothukudi; and about 36 km from Tirunelveli. Several villages surrounding Nazareth are considered as part of Nazareth. Nazareth is connected to major cities in Tamil Nadu as well as to all the villages surrounding that area.

== Climate ==
The climate of Nazareth town is usually dry. A short rainy season exists but the weather, for the most part, is hot and humid. Paddy rice is mainly cultivated in and around the places of Nazareth on a large scale, followed by cereals green and black grams. Banana is also cultivated here on a large scale.

== History ==
Nazareth was also known as "Therku Mudhalur". During that time, over 4,000 people lived in this region.

Starting in 1805, the Christian residents of Saanpaththu began calling it "Nazareth," a name that has endured to this day.

A pivotal figure in Nazareth's development was Canon Arthur Margoschis. He arrived in India in 1875 and visited Nazareth in 1876 (then part of the Tinnevelly/Tirunelveli district). His contributions were immense: he established separate schools for boys and girls, providing quality education to all children regardless of caste or creed. He also built a hospital, an orphanage, and a vocational training center, greatly improving the lives of the local people. He was instrumental in the construction of the Tirunelveli-Tiruchendur railway line. For these efforts, he is still revered as the "Father of Nazareth."

Nazareth is a Christian majority town, created by missionaries from the United Kingdom, primarily through the work of Canon Arthur Margoschis. Canon Arthur Margoschis (1852-1908) is recognized as "Father of Nazareth". The town is surrounded by Hindu communities. The main Hindu temple was built in the late 1960s. The town was previously known as 'Saann Pathu' and also as 'Therku Mudalur' and was renamed by the residents. It is an educational centre with schools such as Margoschis Higher Secondary School for Boys and St. John's Girls' Higher Secondary School, Margoschis college of Arts and Science, Art Industrial School, TNDTA Kaspa Primary School, Dr Mathuram Middle school and a Vocational education institution.

Thiruchendur Co-operative Spinning Mills Limited, Nazareth which was the only spinning mill and was the livelihood for many people in that area for close to a century, was closed a decade ago in 2002-03 period due to financial crunch and lack of modernization.

Earlier Nazareth was part of the Tirunelveli CSI diocese and in 2003 Thoothukudi - Nazareth Diocese was formed after bifurcation from Tirunelveli Diocese.

As the history of the church, a small village by name "Shanpathu" with 8 families became Christians in the year 1803 through Rev. Sathyanathan. Its revenue extent is 7 sq. miles. The first church a thatched building with palmyrah leaves was built in 1803 named St. John's church at Nazareth.

Many Missionaries rendered services to the growth of Christianity. Of whom, the contribution of Canon A. Margoschis to the many-sided growth of this village is notable. The development of Nazareth with the educational institutions, the orphanage and Art Industrial School, the hospital and the church is principally due to the result of the efforts of the missionary Canon A. Margoschis. During decades of the 19th century, Nazareth was identified as a small hamlet situated near Valaiyadi or Vahuthankuppam and the people of Nazareth had to get things from the shops or the neighbouring villages crossing the sandy soil clustered with the bush and trees.

=== St. Luke's Hospital, Nazareth ===
Though it was founded in 1870 by Dr J.M. Strachan, the monumental growth was under the able stewardship of Canon A. Margoschis. As he had the knowledge of medicine, he could do medical service, helping thousands of sick. This service was rendered freely to all irrespective of caste and creed. There was a dire need to provide more facilities to the swelling number of sick in the hospital with wards, compounding room. To meet the requirements, the main building of the hospital was built by him in 1892 and the hospital was Christened "St. Luke’s Hospital" by him on the day of St. Luke's (18 October) in 1892.

=== Orphanage and art industrial school ===
Canon Arthur Margoschis built a small hut hundred yards away from his bungalow for the orphans in 1877. As the number of orphans increased, he took efforts to put up a building for them and the same was built in 1878 in the place where the Art Industrial School is now. He was made aware of his responsibilities and obligations towards the less-privileged and was very anxious to introduce teaching for them on industrial courses. Hence he founded the Art Industrial School in the orphanage itself on 14-11-1878. Carpentry, Black-smithy and sewing courses were started and then weaving section was introduced. In 1884, the first sewing machine was bought and the art of tailoring was introduced. The lower Secondary Training was provided and in 1900, Upper Secondary Training was transferred from Tuticorin to Nazareth. He was the manager of the school until his death. In those days the Art Industrial School, the brain-child of Canon Margoschis, was praised as the only one of its kind in the district and the oldest in the Presidency of Madras.

=== Girls' high school ===
Canon Arthur Margoschis was made superintendent of the school 1876 itself. He founded Teachers Training School in 1877. He also stressed the need for good education to women and started kindergarten school. In 1886, he made a historic achievement of upgrading the normal school to a high school. The school became a full-fledged high school in 1888 and the first set of women in the Presidency of Madras to pass the Matriculation Examination was from this school. The Standard of the school was very much appreciated by the Director of Public Instruction in 1890. This school is the first high school for women in south India.

=== Boys' high school ===
Canon Arthur Margoschis founded a middle school for boys in 1882 in the name "Anglo – Vernacular School". In 1885; this school was awarded " The Best School" title in the Presidency of Madras, He made a successful venture of upgrading it as "high school" in 1889 in spite of the stiff opposition from the then Bishop Rt. Rev. Caldwell. This infuriated the Bishop, who closed down the high school section in 1892.

Canon Arthur Margoschis adopted Nazareth as his "Child", and with the help of the orphans and hired labourers, he laid the metal road from Nazareth to Valaiyadi and planted trees on both sides. Telegraphic office was opened on 25-12-1894, as a result of the initiative taken by him. He showed interest in town planning also and the 5th street was formed by him. As a result of his efforts, the original plan to lay the railway line from Tirunelveli to Tiruchendur via. Thenthiruperai was changed and it was decided to lay it via Nazareth. This work, was put into operation a few years after his death.

The people of Nazareth celebrated the 100th death centenary of Canon Arthur Margoschis at Nazareth from 23 April to 27 April 2008.

== Demographics ==
Religions in Nazareth TP (2011)
Religion	Percent
Christianity	54.85%
Hinduism	44.77%
Other or not stated	0.38%

As of 2011 India census, Nazareth Town Panchayat had a population of 16,584. Nazareth had a sex ratio of 1028 females per 1000 males and a literacy rate of 94.75%. Scheduled Castes and Scheduled Tribes made up 9.16% and 1.39% of the population respectively. Total area of Nazareth town is 10.98 km^{2}.

== Festivals ==
Nazareth town celebrates Christmas with a fireworks display, lighting the streets and singing Christmas carols at the church. The celebration attracts many former residents each year.

Vinayagar Chathurthi celebrates at Sri Sakthi Vinayagar Temple and Vinayagar statue placing in most of the street. Also Vinayagar Chariot circumambulate through the city.

Pongal festival celebrates 3 days by hindus. Every hindus home and roads are portraited by Kolam. During this festival sports events, cultural programs are conducting in every streets.

== Transport ==
Nazareth is situated in SH-93 which connects Valliyur and Alwarthirunagari. There are also major roads which connect Nazareth with Kurumbur, Then Thirupperai and Palaniyappapuram.

=== Bus ===
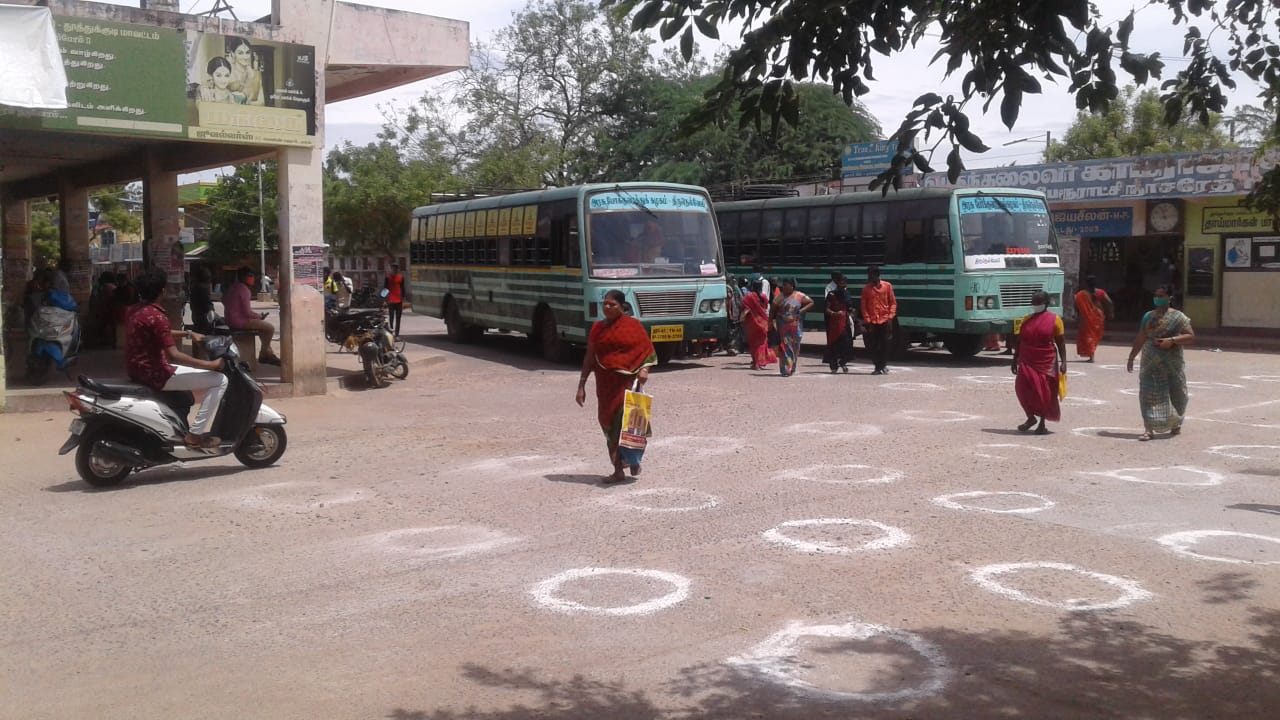
Image of Nazareth Bus stand

There is a bus stand named "Perunthalaivar Kamarajar Bus Stand" in the middle of this town. Frequent bus services are available to Tiruchendur, Tirunelveli, Thoothukkudi, Sathankulam and Udangudi from here. Also, buses to Uvari, Thisaiyanvilai, Madurai, Tiruchirappalli, Chennai, Coimbatore, Kovilpatti and Marthandam are available from here.

=== Rail ===
There is a Railway station in this town. The Nazareth Railway Station (Station Code : NZT) lies in Tirunelveli - Tiruchendur Broad Gauge Line. The station has two platforms.

=== Nearest Airports ===
- Domestic Airport
1. Tuticorin Airport (IATA: TCR, ICAO: VOTK).
- International Airport
1. Madurai Airport (IATA: IXM, ICAO: VOMD).
2. Thiruvananthapuram International Airport (IATA: TRV, ICAO: VOTV).

== Sports ==
The town is famous for producing many sports personalities, especially in football. Annually 'Canon Margoschis Memorial trophy' State-level football tournaments, is organized by the Margoschis Recreation Club, at Nazareth.

== Education ==
Nazareth has separate secondary schools for boys and girls, an arts and science college, an engineering college, a polytechnic college, a Nursing (BSc) college and an industrial training institution called Art Industrial School (I.T.I) & Advanced Training Centre.

The town has several small schools including a Margoschis Matriculation School, Seventh-day Adventist primary school, Solomon Matriculation School and Nightingale Nursery and primary school. Tamil medium schools include Kaspa Primary school, St. Johns Model School, Dr Mathuram Middle School, TNDTA Primary School, Thiruvalluvar Colony etc.

=== Primary and middle schools ===
Tamil Medium

- TNDTA Kaspa Primary School, Nazareth.
- St. Johns model School, Nazareth.
- TNDTA Dr Maduram Middle School, Nazareth.
- TNDTA Primary School, Thiruvalluvar Colony, Nazareth.
- St. Joseph R.C. Primary School, Kandasamypuram, Nazareth.
- TNDTA Primary School, Valaiyadi, Nazareth.
- TNDTA Primary School, Agappaikkulam, Nazareth.
- Hindu Primary School, Agappaikkulam, Nazareth.

English Medium

- Margoschis Matriculation School
- Seventh-day Adventist School
- Solomon Matriculation School
- Nightingale Nursery and Primary School

Margoschis Higher Secondary School

The first evangelist Aerion started a Primary school in 1839 with the aim of imparting education to the local children. Soon another school was started for girls. In 1880 the Boys’ Primary School became a Higher Grade Middle School. When Canon Arthur Margoschis was the Missionary at Nazareth, the Higher Grade Middle School became an "Anglo-vernacular School". In 1885, this school was selected for the Award of the "Best School of the Madras Presidency" and in the very same year, it was upgraded into a High school. But in 1890, the high school classes were taken away from this high school and attached to the Caldwell High School, Thoothukudi. So the school at Nazareth was reverted into a Higher Grade Middle School. From 1890 to 1912, it served as a model school for the Higher Grade Teacher Trainees. In 1909, it became a recognized Middle school and in that capacity, it continued to function till 1932. The school attained the status of a high school again on 23 October 1932. New buildings were added to the school at various periods to meet the need for additional classrooms, laboratories etc. When the new educational pattern of 10 +2 was introduced, the school was upgraded into a Higher Secondary School in 1978.

St John's Girls Higher Secondary School

St. John's Girl's Hr. Sec. School is the first school in south India and a third one in India, which was started for girls. It was started by Rev. Hough in 1820. It was upgraded into St. John's Girls High School in 1886; many English missionaries Rev. Camerar, Green, Swingler and Evans showed much interest in the development of the school and worked for it. St. Michael, St. Gabriel and Guardian Angel's hostels were built. The chapel was built by the efforts of Rev. G.T. Selwyn in 1939. It was upgraded into Hr. Sec. School in 1978. Homes run by KNII and world vision are also here.

=== Higher education ===
Arts and Science College

- Nazareth Margoschis College is located at Pillaiyannmanai

Polytechnic College

- Jayaraj Annapackiam CSI Polytechnic College

Engineering College

- Jayaraj Annapackiam CSI Engineering College operates in Margoschis Nagar in Nazareth.

Nursing college

- C.S.I St Luke's College of Nursing. It was started in 2011. This is located on the campus of Thirumaraiyur, Nazareth. Here they are offering B.Sc. Nursing 4 years Course

- St. Lukes Community College - present inside the Luke's Hospital Campus, Nazareth

Training schools

- The Art Industrial School (I.T.I) in Nazareth is a relatively well known for technical training school in that part of the district since 14.11.1878.
- St. John's Teacher Training Institute (DT.Ed)
- AIS. Advanced Training Centre (Technical Training 2 years Course)

== Famous People ==
N. Angela Lincy Vasanthakumari, is a noted high jumper who had set a national record of 1.75m in the 1987 National Games held in Trivandrum when she was 15yrs old. Later she achieved her career-best of 1.77m in 1993 when she was 21yrs old. She is an alumnus of St. John's Girls Higher Secondary School, Nazareth.

Dr D Daniel Sundararaj, Retired Dean (14.9-1971 to 5.6.1974) of AC&RI, Tamil Nadu Agricultural University, Coimbatore (Formerly Madras Agricultural College) who has authored and co-authored many books in the field of agriculture in early 1940s'-70s'.

== See also ==
- Margoschis Higher Secondary School
- St. John's Girls Higher Secondary School
- St. Luke's Hospital, Nazareth
- Art Industrial School Private ITI
- St. John's Cathedral, Nazareth
- Mela Vellamadam
- Thirukkolur
- Alwarthirunagari
