= Sawyerpuram =

- town
- Location in Tamil Nadu, India
- Coordinates: 8.49°N 78.1°E
- Country: India
- State: Tamil Nadu
- District: Tuticorin

Government
  - Type: Tamil Nadu

Languages
  - Official: Tamil
- Time zone: UTC+5:30 (IST)
- PIN: 628251
- Telephone code: (0091) 04630
- Nearest city: Tuticorin
- Vidhan Sabha constituency: Srivaikundam

Sawyerpuram is a town panchayat in Tuticorin district, Tamil Nadu, India.

Microliths are found in large in numbers around Sawyerpuram (and additionally in Kulattur, Tirunelveli). They were found embedded in the fossil-bearing sand dunes. These available evidences in Sawyerpuram point the chronology of the microlithic culture in South India to circa 4000 B.C.

Since the missionary Dr. G. U. Pope ministered in this place, the population is predominantly Christian.

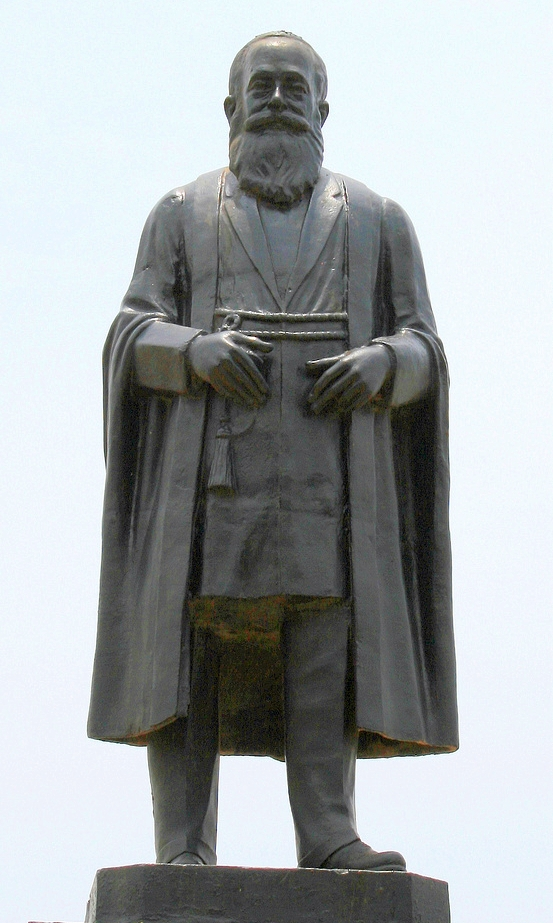
Statue of Dr. G.U. Pope in Chennai

== Religions and cultures ==
Religions:Hinduism & Christianity

Tamil culture is widely followed among the people living in Sawyerpuram whether they are Christians or Hindus.

== Life expectancy and environment ==
The small town is known for peaceful environment and considered to be the cleanest small town in India with less population and the average life expectancy is 83.7 and which is higher than any small towns in India.

== Education ==
=== List of colleges ===
- Pope's College of Arts and Science
- Dr.G.U. Pope College of Engineering
- Dr.G.U. Pope College of Education
- Jeya Polytechnic College

=== List of schools ===
- Pope Memorial Higher Secondary School
- St. Mary's Girls Higher Secondary School
- A.M.A.Hindu Higher Secondary School
- National Nursery and Primary School
- Martin Nursery and Primary School
- A.M.A Hindu Nursery and Primary School
- Gnanasigamani Evangelical Primary School
- Joy Sharon Nursery and Primary School
- The Vikasa School

== Transportation ==
- Tuticorin Airport (going to be international in 3 years)
- V.O. Chidambaranar Port Authority 34 km
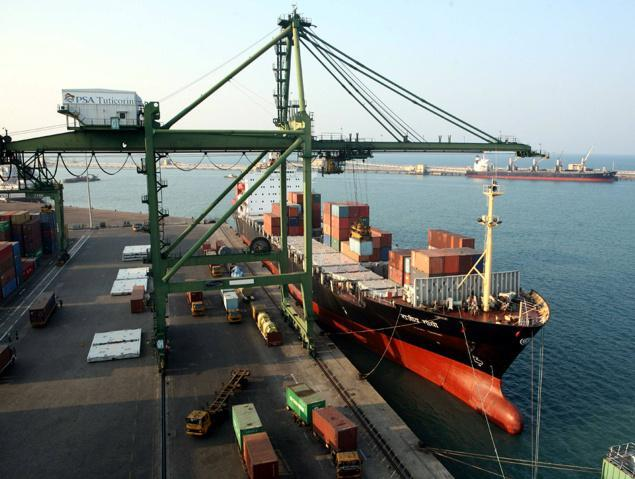
  V.O. Chidambaranar Port Authority
- Trivandrum International Airport 192.2 km
- Madurai International Airport 152.2 km
- Tuticorin Railway Station 25 km

== Natural resources and climate ==
In summer the climate remains warm and on other seasons the climate can be cool and windy. This small town is also known for the cultivation of bananas and rice because of its red soil and jack fruit, star fruit, jambul fruit, pea nut, cucumber are also cultivated in few places around the town.

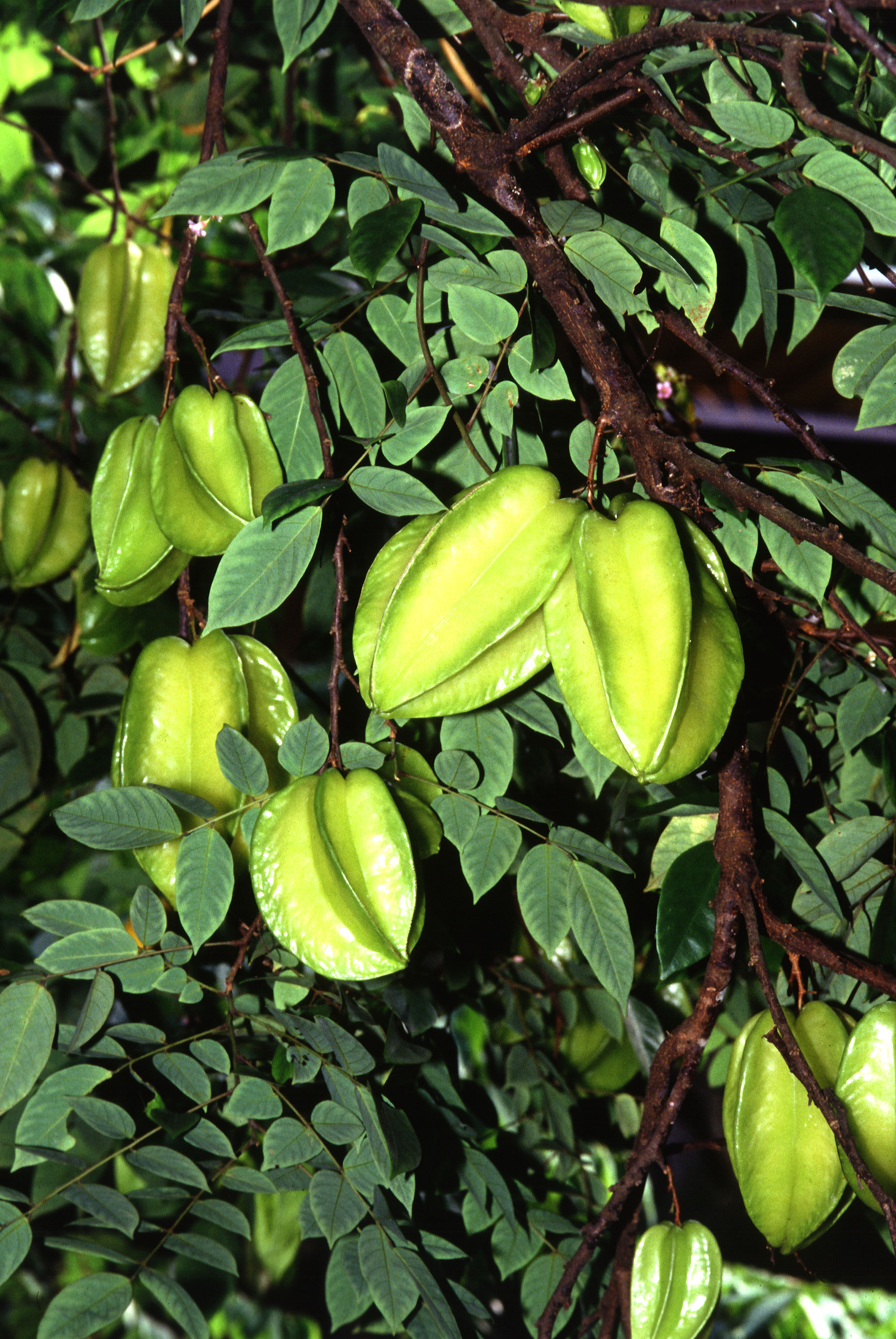
Unripe star fruit on the tree in Theri Area

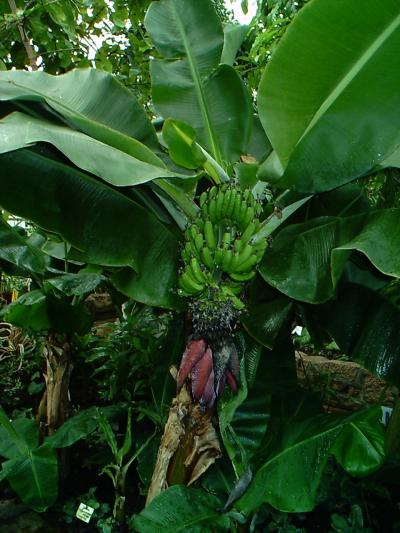
Banana tree of sawyerpuram

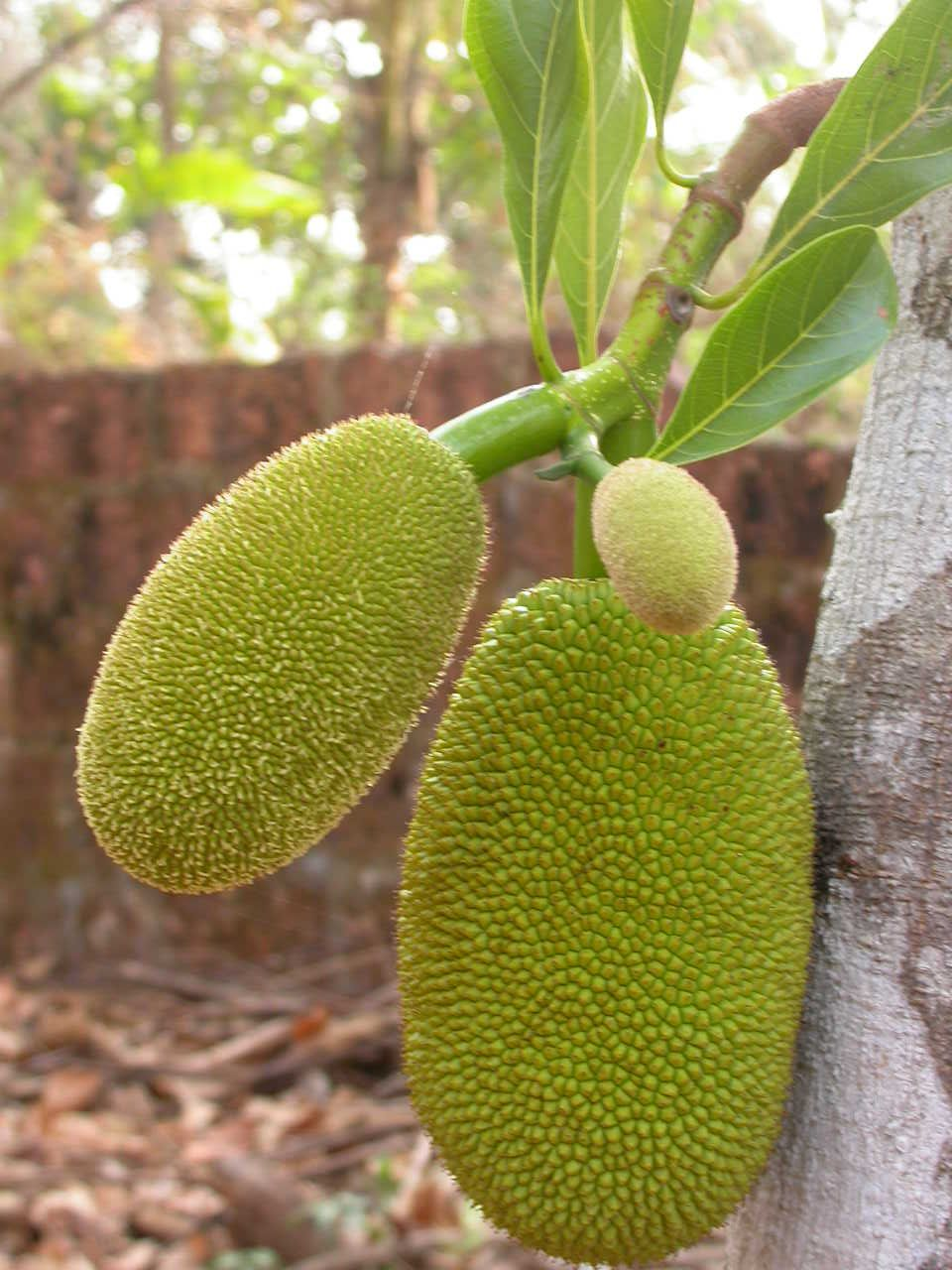
Young jackfruit

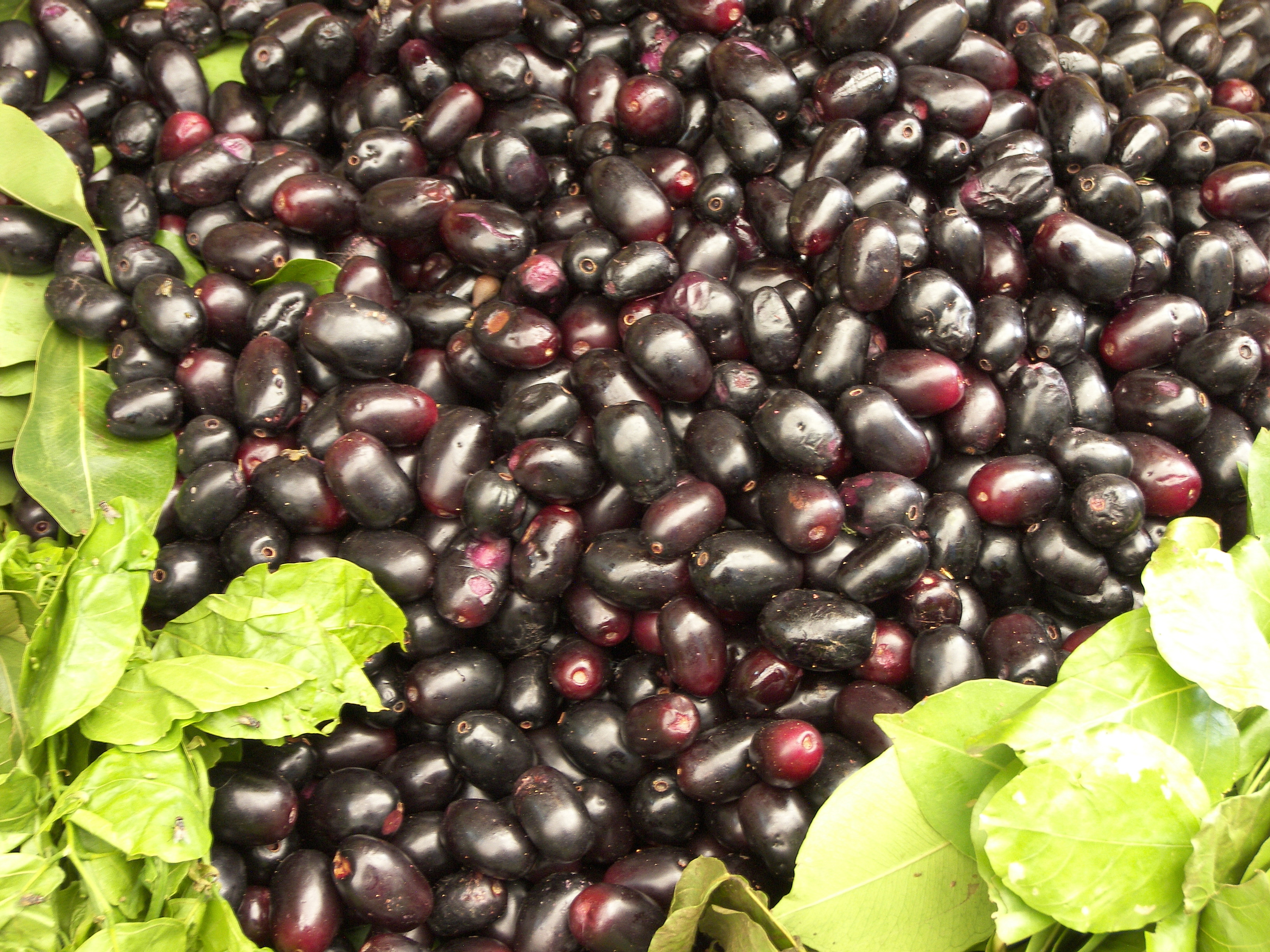
Ripe jambul fruits ripe from tree
