= C. K. Rhodes =

C.K. Rhodes in 1936

Charles Kenneth Rhodes CIE ICS (5 May 1889 – 6 January 1941) was a British civil servant who worked for the British Empire's Indian Civil Service (ICS).

== Early life ==
Rhodes was the only son of William Manfield Rhodes and Mary Eleanor Parish, was born on 5 May 1889, Guildford, Surrey, England.

He was educated at Charterhouse, and Brasenose College, Oxford. While at Oxford, he was awarded a Blue for golf.

== Indian Civil Service ==
After university he sought a position in the Indian Civil Service, gaining acceptance on 13 October 1913. He transferred to then British India, residing at Shillong, Assam, India. A group of British Civil Service officers introduced golf to Shillong in 1898 by constructing a nine-hole Shillong Golf Course.

Rhodes served as an infantry subaltern during the First World War. He was commissioned into the Indian Army Reserve of Officers as a second lieutenant in 1915 and was attached to the North Staffordshire Regiment.. In May 1919 he Rhodes was promoted from lieutenant to captain.

In 1926 Captain Charles Kenneth Rhodes & Captain Jackson converted Shillong Golf Course from a nine-hole course into an 18-hole course.

They had to raise funds for the improvements themselves. Charles infamously sold one of his mother's favorite riding horses. It was sadly missed by her, it would still recognise her and would come towards the roadside as she passed by.

In the 1936 New Year Honours, Rhodes was appointed a Companion of the Order of the Indian Empire (CIE).

== Marriage ==
On 2 September 1916 at All Saints Church, Shillong, he married Margaret Geraldine Herbert, daughter of Douglas Herbert, LA, Inspector General of Police of Shillong. Herbert Pakenham-Walsh, Bishop of Assam, officiated. Mrs Rhodes was a campaigner and lobbyist for women's rights in India, and in particular for the abolition of Sati, the practice of burning alive of widows on their husbands' funeral pyres.

Rhodes corresponded with Violet Markham, public servant, writer and women's rights activist from 1918 to 1919.

== Death ==
Rhodes was killed on 6 January 1941 when the Indian National Airways plane crashed in flames shortly after taking off from the Delhi aerodrome. The pilot was also killed.

He was buried on 7 January 1941 in New Delhi.
