= William Nairn Forbes =

British architect and military engineer

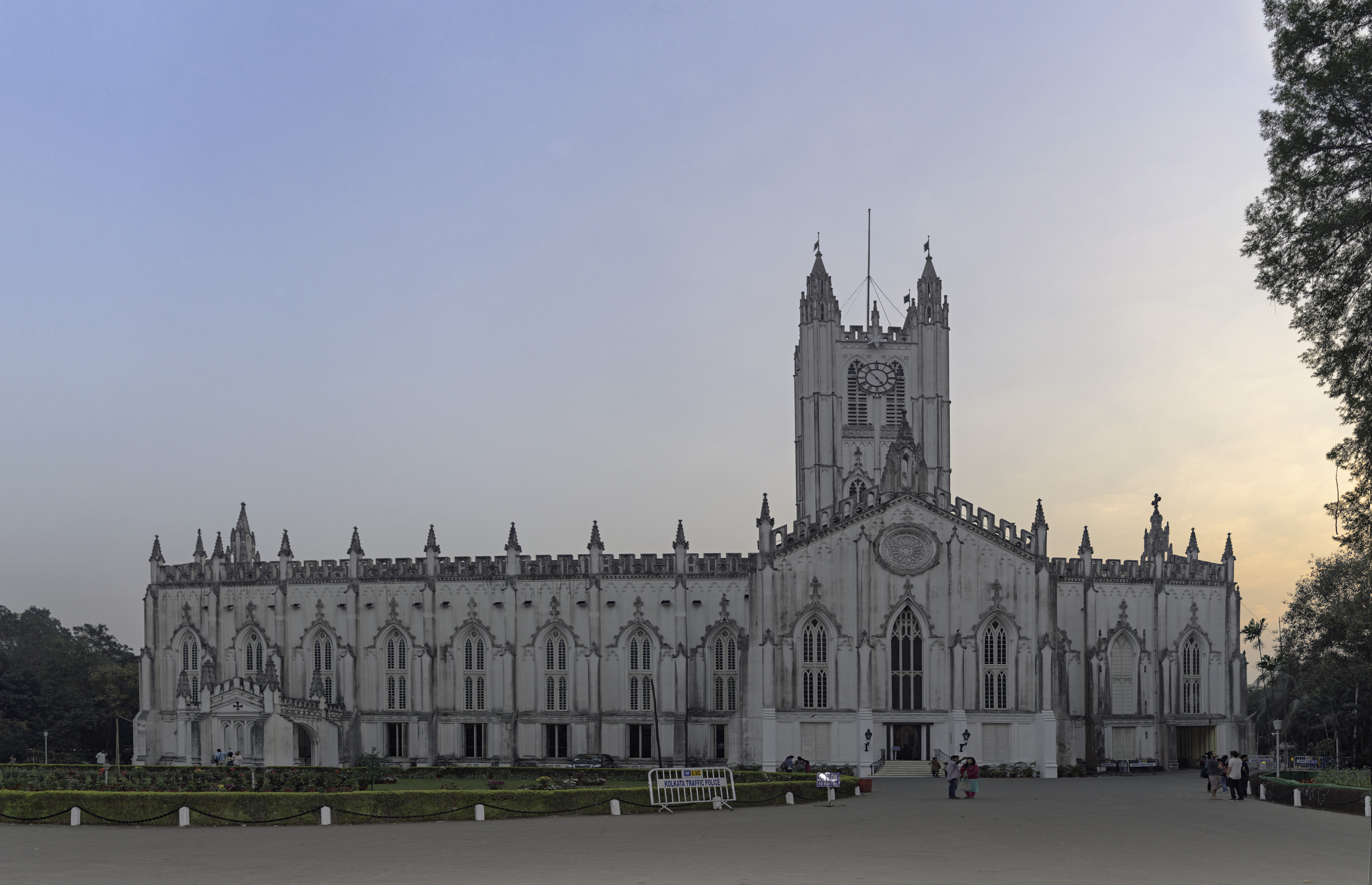
St Paul's Cathedral, Kolkata, designed by Forbes, 1839–47.

Major-General William Nairn Forbes (3 April 1796 – 1 May 1855) was a British architect and military engineer in the Bengal Army. He was responsible for the design of the Anglican St Paul's Church, Calcutta (1839–47) in Bengal during Company rule in India, now the cathedral of the Diocese of Calcutta and sited in Kolkata, India.

Forbes's design for the spire and crossing tower of St Paul's, Calcutta was inspired by Norwich Cathedral, in Norfolk, England. After damage in successive earthquakes in 1897 and 1934 the tower and spire were redesigned on the model of the "Bell Harry" Tower – designed by John Wastell – on the crossing of Canterbury Cathedral in Kent, the seat of the Archbishop of Canterbury and the mother church of the Anglican Communion.

Forbes was also architect in 1831 of the Greek Revival Calcutta Silver Mint and drew inspiration for the portico from the Parthenon in Athens.

== Education and early life ==
William Nairn Forbes was the sixth son of John Forbes, of Blackford in Aberdeenshire, Scotland, where William Forbes was born. He was mostly educated by a tutor at home, though for two consecutive winters (1808–1809) he studied mathematics and natural philosophy at King's College, Aberdeen. He showed an early aptitude for constructing model machines. In 1811 he commenced study in mathematics and natural philosophy at the University of Edinburgh, where he lived with Rev. Archibald Alison – a relative of Forbes's – and his sons, William Alison – later professor of medicine at Edinburgh – and Archibald Alison – historian and later 1st Baronet Alison. At university he was taught by Professor John Playfair, co-founder of the Royal Society of Edinburgh, and by Professor John Leslie.

From 1812 he attended East India Company Military Seminary at Addiscombe, the military academy for officer cadets of the private army of the East India Company; in 1813 he graduated and received a case of mathematical instruments for his "superior attainments" in his examinations. Afterwards he was attached to the Royal Engineers at Chatham, Kent. There he was noticed by the head of the Royal Corps of Military Surveyors and Draftsmen and recruited to the Trigonometrical Survey, working under the Board of Ordnance in Wales and Shropshire.

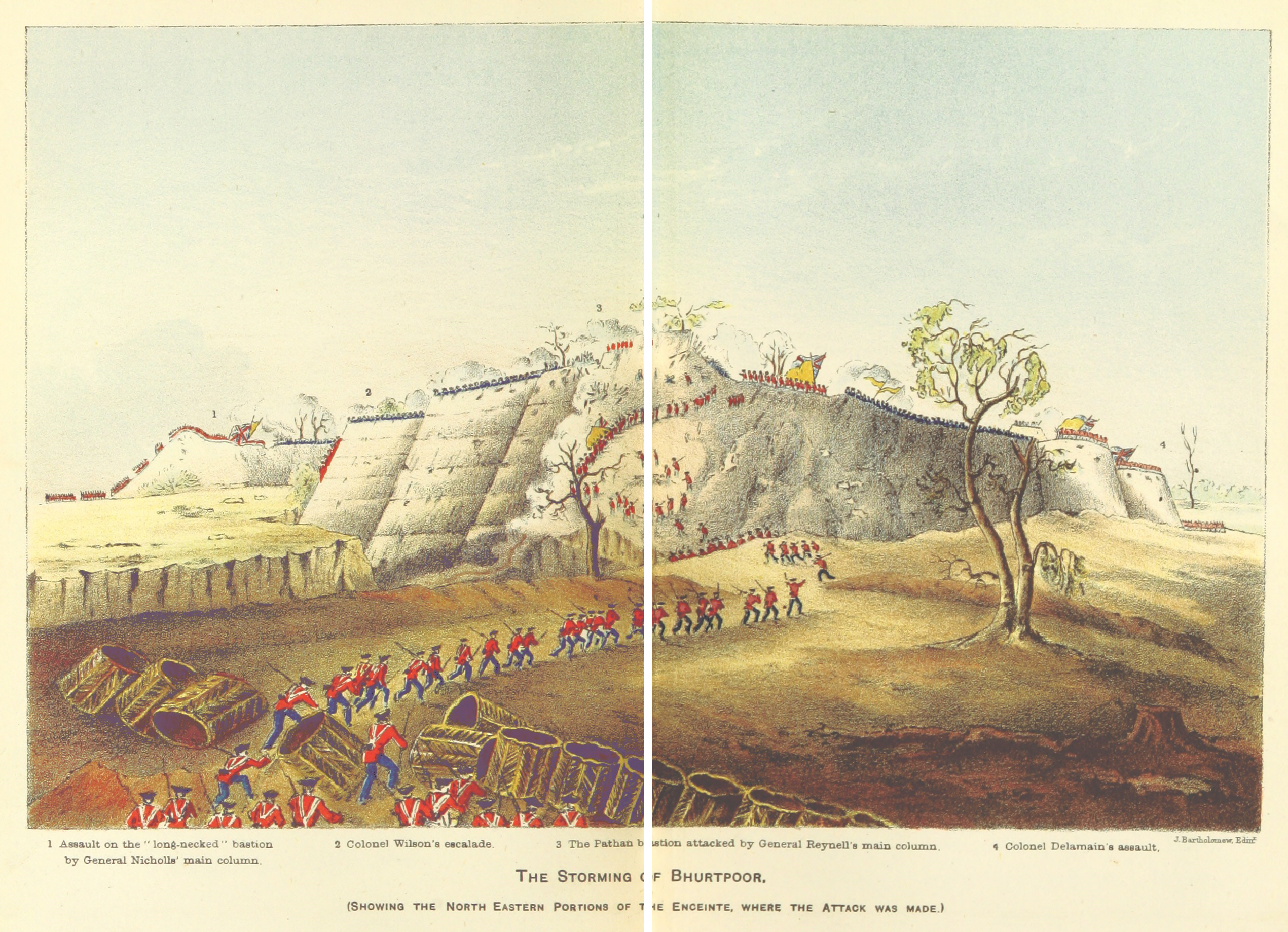
The Siege of Bharatpur's end was within hours of the detonation of Forbes's mines

== Career in India ==
Forbes was commissioned ensign and transferred in 1816 to the Bengal Engineers, part of the Bengal Army, presidency army of the Bengal Presidency. Subsequently, he was appointed Surveyor of Embankments in Bengal and Orissa. He was commissioned lieutenant in 1818. That year he was asked to design a cathedral church for Calcutta by the Governor-General, Francis Rawdon-Hastings, 1st Marquess of Hastings, but the design was not authorized and was not built.

In December 1819 Forbes was recalled to Britain to supervise the manufacture of new machines for the Royal Mint at Calcutta. In 1820, he joined the London-based Institution of Civil Engineers as corresponding member. With the completed tools and parts he returned to India in 1823 and was put in charge of the new mint's construction as "Superintendent of the Mint Machinery". Forbes also authored a report on the channel linking the Hooghly River and the Ganges, advising on the engineering of keeping it open for navigation.

Forbes requested in November 1825 that he be allowed to join the Siege of Bharatpur; this was granted, and Forbes broke his right arm and two ribs during reconnaissance of the lines. Nonetheless, he was instrumental in preparing the large mines by which breaches in the walls were effected and Bharatpur stormed. According to Stapleton Cotton, 1st Viscount Combermere, the commanding officer and Commander-in-Chief, India, Forbes "was of the greatest possible use" and "a first-rate Officer of Engineers". Thereafter Forbes returned to the mint and was promoted captain in 1827. In 1828, Forbes was for two months on sick leave, the only such absence of his career. Also in 1828, Forbes became a full member of the Institution of Civil Engineers.

In 1831 Forbes designed the new building for the mint, known as the "Old Silver Mint", which he designed in the newly fashionable Greek Revival style. In 1832–33 Forbes joined a team surveying a route for a canal between Rajmahal and Calcutta and submitted the survey report. Forbes was appointed Master of the Calcutta Mint in June 1836. He was promoted major in 1839.

In 1839, work began on the construction of Forbes's designs for St Paul's Cathedral, Calcutta, which he had prepared at the behest of Daniel Wilson, the Bishop of Calcutta.

Forbes was made lieutenant-colonel in 1841. For five months in 1847 – the year the cathedral was completed – Forbes was an acting member of the Military Board in place of the absent Chief Engineer. Forbes had spent much energy on the cathedral project, in addition to his official duties. That December, Forbes was sent again to Britain sit on a commission into the running of the Royal Mint. In April 1849 this work was done and Forbes returned to the mint in Calcutta, in which post he remained until 1854, having been promoted colonel in 1852.

Forbes was member of various learned societies, including the Geological Society of London, the Institut d'Afrique, and The Asiatic Society. Outside his own line of work, Forbes was also interested in steam power and drainage in town planning.

== Illness and death ==
In 1854, the year he was promoted major-general, Forbes began to complain of exhaustion; though having always been in robust health he continued work at the mint and was working on designs for a new Calcutta Post Office. In November he suffered "spasm of the heart". By 1855 he was forced by worsening health to seek permission to return to Britain.

Forbes embarked on the "Oriental" on 9 April 1855; he died at sea on 1 May.

A bust of Forbes in the Calcutta Mint was installed by the then Government of India, and a monument dedicated to him inside the cathedral and financed by public subscription was erected after his death.
