= George Cotton (disambiguation) =

George Cotton (1813–1866) was an English bishop and educator in India.

George Cotton may also refer to:

- George W. Cotton (1821–1892), South Australia politician
- George Cotton (courtier) (1505–1545), usher to Henry, Duke of Richmond, and brother of Sir Richard Cotton
- George Cotton (priest) (1743–1805), English Anglican priest

== See also ==
- George Radcliffe Colton (1865–1916), Governor of Puerto Rico
