= James Cotton (priest) =

Welsh clergyman (1780–1862)

James Henry Cotton (10 February 1780 – 28 May 1862) was a clergyman and educationist who held the position of Dean of Bangor from 1838 until his death and was instrumental in the restoration of Bangor Cathedral.

He was the son of George Cotton, Dean of Chester, uncle of George Cotton, Bishop of Calcutta and the first cousin of Sir Stapleton Cotton. He was educated at Rugby School and Trinity College, Cambridge, and ordained shortly after graduating. By 1810 he was junior vicar and precentor of Bangor Cathedral, and as such was responsible for the fabric of the building. In the same year he married Mary Anne Majendie, daughter of Henry Majendie, the Bishop of Bangor; they had one son. During the 1820s, the cathedral was restored and rearranged to allow for services in both Welsh and English. He also served as rector of St Tyfrydog's Church, Llandyfrydog.

Cotton took a great interest in local education, setting up Sunday schools and day schools in several parishes within the diocese. In 1848 he was a founder member of the Bangor Diocesan Board of Education, formed after the notorious "Blue Books". After the death of his first wife, he married Mary Laurens. The younger of their two daughters married Evan Lewis, later Dean of Bangor. Dean Cotton was buried in Bangor Cathedral. In 1864, construction work started on St James Church in Bangor. It was built in memory of him.
