= St. John's Diocesan Girls' Higher Secondary School =

Coordinates: 22°32′15.00″N 88°21′15.23″E

- 17, Sarat Bose Road, Kolkata, West Bengal, India

Information
- Motto: The Good Retain, The Better Follow
- Religious affiliation: Church of North India
- Founded: 1876
- Founder: Angelina Margaret Hoare
- Principal: Snigdha Gain
- Grades: Nursery I, Nursery II; Kindergarten or Transition School; I to IV (Junior School); V to VII (Middle school); VIII to X (High School); XI to XII (Higher Secondary School)
- Gender: Girls only
- Average class size: 60 students in each of 4 sections of a class.
- Language: English, Bengali, Hindi
- Houses: 4
- Colours: Green red blue yellow
- Sports: Athletics, Roller Skating, Karate, and basketball
- Nickname: Diocenas
- Publication: Papyrus
- Affiliations: WBBSE and WBCHSE
- Website: stjohnsdiocesanschool.edu.in

St. John's Diocesan Girls' H.S. School (informally known as Diocesan or Dio) is a girls-only day school located in Kolkata (Calcutta), West Bengal, India. It was established in 1876 by British missionary Angelina Margaret Hoare from Kent, England who devoted her life to the advancement of women's education in British India. It is a Christian school run by the Protestant Church of North India and its primary language of instruction is English. The school's patron saint is Saint John the Baptist. Although previously a college, the school was stripped of its college status by the British Government when freedom-fighter Bina Das, a student of the school, attempted to assassinate the Governor of Bengal, Stanley Jackson, in the Convocation Hall of the University of Calcutta on 6 February 1932.

Today, the school is often considered to be one of the most prestigious girls' schools in Bengal, and has a rich history of distinguished alumnae such as Lady Abala Bose, Gayatri Chakravorty Spivak, and Maitreyi Devi. It is situated in the iconic Landsdowne Road (officially Sarat Bose Road) in South Kolkata and also runs a school for underprivileged children in Ripon Street.

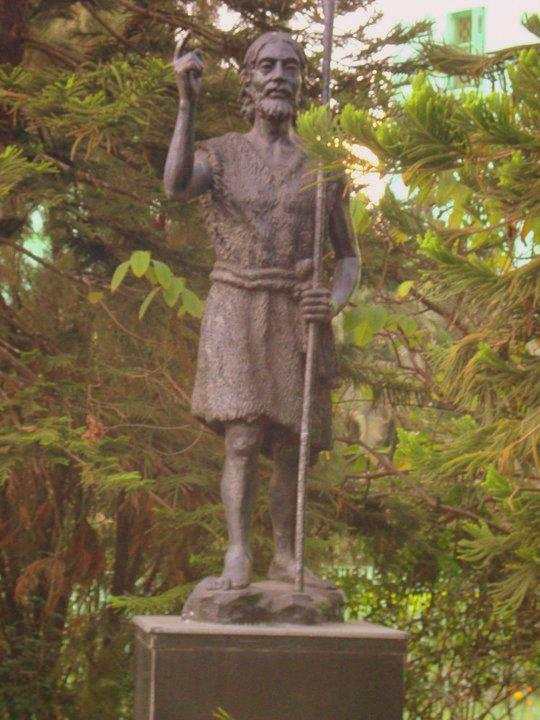
Statue of St.John-the Baptist at School Campus

== History ==
School gate

The school is one of the oldest girls' schools in Calcutta (present-day Kolkata). In 1894, the school was named St. John's Diocesan by the Clewer Sisters of John the Baptist from Windsor, Berkshire. The school was started in 1876 by Sister Angelina Margaret Hoare (17 May 1843 – 10 January 1892), a British missionary from Kent, England who devoted her life to the advancement of women's education in British India. From her diaries we know that the school started with 16 female students.

From 1908 to 1931, St. John's Diocesan School remained the only Christian women's college of good repute in eastern India. Hoare wrote in a letters to her brother in England: "...my idea of the future of our Diocesan School is that it should be an institution not confined to any particular society or an elite group..." She died at age 48 in 1892. Upon her death, Bishop of Calcutta, Bishop Johnson, praised her in the following words:

...be assured, all of you that her devoted life has not been lost, for the public of Calcutta. The work she has done can never be altogether lost sight of. Not to mention the seed she has sown in the hearts of her beloved children in the Diocesan School of Calcutta and other schools in the Sundarbans, which will bear fruit in the generations to come...

On 7 April 1931, Beena Das who was a student of the school, shot at the then Governor, Stanley Jackson, although he was not hit. The recognition of the college status was taken way thereafter by the British Government. During its earlier days till the 1970s, it was a co-educational school. However, during the 1970s, the need for educational institutions for women in Kolkata was felt and since then the school has devoted itself to the betterment of female education only. It has more than 3,800 female students and is affiliated to the WBBSE and WBCHSE.

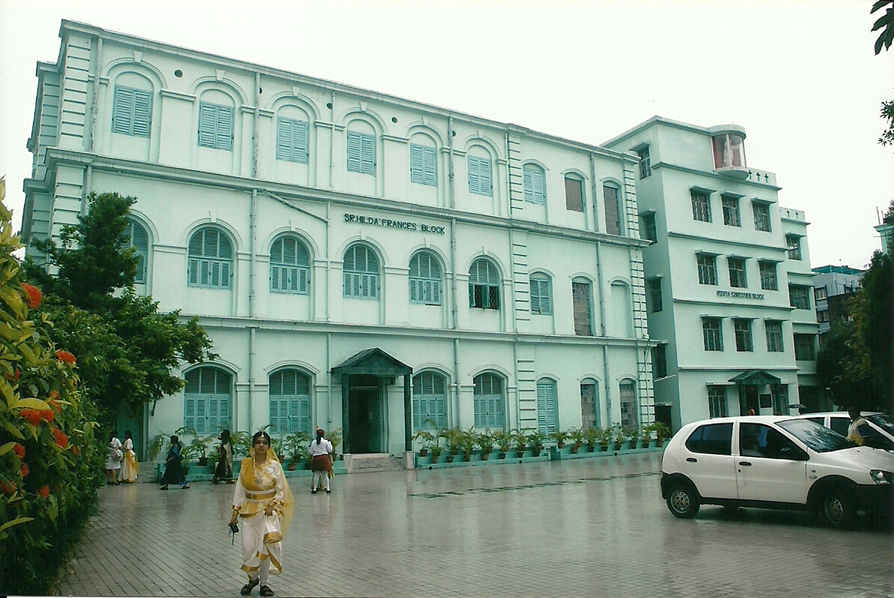
Campus

== Principals ==
List of Principals
Sister Hilda Francis	—
Charubala Das	—
Molina Mukherjee	—
Nilima Pyne	—
Joya Shome	—
T. Samuel Raj	1985 - 1990
Rosita Chrestien	1990 - 2012
Carolyn Lionel	2012 - 2018
Snigdha Gain	2019–present

== Academic life ==
The school admits only female students and is predominantly taught by female teachers. The school teaches from the Preschool level to the higher secondary (10 + 2) and is affiliated under the WBBSE and WBCHSE. The medium of instruction is English although Bengali and Hindi are also taught as first languages beside English. Pre-primary, Primary, Secondary and Higher Secondary section starts class at the same time in the morning, five days a week, with the first two sections having an earlier finish than the rest.

=== Prayer and anthem ===
Before starting classes students pray the Lord's Prayer in the assembly. The school anthem is Make Me a Channel of Your Peace which is the hymn version of "Make Me an Instrument of Your Peace", adapted by Sebastian Temple.

=== Campus ===
The campus of the school is a mixture of natural beauty along with old and new buildings. It has separate playgrounds for students of nursery classes and other senior classes. Inside the campus there is a park, three play grounds, a basketball court and seven buildings in a lush green surrounding. The school has a small chapel inside one of the buildings.

=== Facilities ===
The school's facilities includes seven laboratories - Physics, Chemistry, Biology, Nutrition, Home Management and Home Nursing, Junior School Computer, Senior School Computer labs. The school has an LCD projector in the library for audio-visual aid to teaching as well as for showing films to the junior students. There is also the United Bank of India -St. John's Diocesan School branch, transport (23 buses), uniform and stationery, booth, tea and coffee booth, school canteen, and a Fulbright Scholar Exchange Programme.

=== Library ===
The school library called ‘Dio Bibliothique’ has a seating capacity of 200 students and has a collection of over 35,000 books and subscribes to periodicals and dailies.

=== Music Room - Conference Hall ===
The school Music and Audio-Visual room known as 'La Sale Diphony’ is also used for conference and seminars. Piano, organ, keyboard, Octapad, guitar and drums are the instruments which are taught in the school.

=== Calendar ===
The Summer vacation, Durga Puja, and Winter or Christmas vacations are given and the sessions usually starts for Lower Nursery to Class X - Feb through January and for Class XI and XII July through June.

=== Celebrations ===
Independence day is celebrated every year on 15 August in the school premises and so is Christmas, Teacher's Day, Children's Day, St. John's Day, Panchishe Boishakh and Baishe Srabon – the birth and death anniversaries respectively of Rabindranath Tagore, Diocesan Education Mission Fete, World AIDS day, Winter Carnival, Diotornie, Melior (Annual School Fest) and other special days of the school.

=== Events ===
The school organizes academic prize distribution ceremony, sports, exhibitions, educational excursions or trips, school fests, conferences, academic and artistic programmes, Christmas Party, Farewell Party (for the leaving batches of 12th grades) and publishes a school magazine every year .

=== Magazine ===
The annual magazine of the school known as 'Papyrus' is published every year highlighting the literary talents and other achievements of the students and the school along with its events.

=== Houses and colors ===
The four houses were formally known as Lily (blue), Rose (pink), Lotus (green), and Pansy (yellow) Currently the four houses and their colors are:

- Angelina Margaret Hoare - Pink
- Sister Mary Victoria - Blue
- Sister Hilda Francis - Green
- Beena Das - Yellow

Green House Pink House Blue House Yellow House

== Social services ==
The school is involved in social services, charities and community welfare. A tradition since 1990 has been donation of one onion and one potato on every Friday by each student from Lower Nursery to Class XII to the school which goes to the St. Joseph's old age home run by the Little Sisters of the Poor. Visits to old age homes such as Mulvany House, Shanti Nivas and St Joseph's Old Age Home are made by students. Some of the reflections of the school's devotion for the welfare of the public at large include the 2004 Tsunami relief, 2009 Aila relief programme, 2008 drinking water supply programme, slum rehabilitation activities, educational Tours for underprivileged children, and a free Seva Clinic at St Mary's Church, Kolkata.

== Awards ==
Winner of 1999 Britannia Trophy for Better Calcutta Project, winner of Best School Award by Pathfinder and Heritage Resources Pvt. Ltd, Centennial Award from the Rotary Club of Victoria, winner of The Best Maintained School Award by TTIS in three consecutive years 2006, 2007 and 2008, TTIS trophy for the school that cares, winner of The Best Maintained School Award by Indian Chambers of Commerce, 2009 "Best School of the Year Award" -Mother Teresa International Award. The 2008 Golden Flame Award was given to one of its teacher, Mrs S.B. Nandi.

== Notable alumni ==
Notable alumni include: Armed Forces of India

- Joyanto Nath Chaudhuri – former Chief of the Army Staff (India)
- Subroto Mukherjee, former Air Marshal of the Indian Air Force

Noted Government Officials

- S. N. Roy, ICS

Arts, culture and entertainment

- Goutam Ghose, film director
- Maitreyi Devi, literati
- Leela Majumdar, author
- Sharmila Tagore, actor
- Mala Sinha, actor
- Shreyasi Chatterjee, artist and art historian, Rabindra Bharati University

Academia and education

- Lady Abala Bose, wife of Sir Jagadish Chandra Bose, who later started Brahmo Samaj Girls' School
- Sarala Roy, founder of Gokhale Memorial School, Kolkata
- Tanika Sarkar, Professor in the Department of History, St. Stephen's College, Delhi
- Gayatri Chakravorty Spivak, Professor in English, Columbia University
- Vina Mazumdar feminist, academic and founding Director of the Centre for Women's Development Studies (CWDS)
- Purabi Roy, noted scholar, author and Netaji researcher

Field of Law

- Subimal Roy – former Justice, Supreme Court of India
