= Angelina Margaret Hoare =

English missionary and educator

- Born: 17 May 1843; Spring Gardens, London, England
- Died: 10 January 1892 (aged 48); Calcutta, British India
- Occupations: Missionary, educator
- Parent(s): Henry Hoare and Lady Mary Marsham

Angelina Margaret Hoare (17 May 1843 – 10 January 1892) was a missionary from Kent, England, who worked to develop women's education in British India.

== Background ==
Hoare was born on 17 May 1843 in Spring Gardens, London. She was the daughter of the banker Henry Hoare (1807-1866) and his wife Lady Mary Marsham, the third daughter of Charles Marsham, 2nd Earl of Romney. She was the sixth child in a family of twelve and was educated at home. Her brother Walter Hoare was a cleric, and served as curate to Robert Milman, who became Bishop of Calcutta. In 1874 Maria Milman, the sister of Robert Milman, invited the Hoare daughters to India to help in the zenana missions.

== Works ==
Hoare arrived in India in January 1876 and bought a large house in Calcutta.

Hoare founded the St. John's Diocesan Girls' Higher Secondary School, Calcutta, West Bengal, India. She started many other educational institutions in India, mostly funded through fundraising in England and donations from her family banking connections.

She used to work by taking suggestions and interacting with various native clergymen and pandits to draw out an educational plan. She avoided anglicising the girls or introducing foreign dress or habits. She wrote in one of the letters to her brother in England: "...my idea of the future of our Diocesan School is that it should be an institution not confined to any particular society or an elite group..."

She also lived among the local people, adopted Indian dress and learnt Bengali.

== Death ==
Hoare died from a brain haemorrhage on 10 January 1892 in Calcutta, aged 48. She was buried in the English cemetery in Calcutta and a memorial to her was erected in the Cathedral.

On her death, Ralph Johnson, the then Bishop of Calcutta, praised her, stating:

...be assured, all of you that her devoted life has not been lost, for the public of Calcutta. The work she has done can never be altogether lost sight of. Not to mention the seed she has sown in the hearts of her beloved children in the Diocesan School of Calcutta and other schools in the Sundarbans, which will bear fruit in the generations to come...

After her death, a biography of her life titled Life of Angelina Margaret Hoare by her Sisters and Mrs. Walter M. Hoare was published in 1897.
