= James Cotton (disambiguation) =

James Cotton (1935–2017) was an American blues musician.

James Cotton may also refer to:

- James Cotton (basketball) (born 1975), American basketball player
- James Cotton (gridiron football) (born 1976), American and Canadian football defensive end
- James Cotton (priest) (1780–1862), English clergyman and Dean of Bangor
- James Sutherland Cotton (1847–1918), British man of letters
