= Diocese of Assam =

Diocese of Assam may refer to the following ecclesiastical jurisdictions in Assam, northeastern India :

- the former Anglican Diocese of Assam, now the Church of North India Diocese of North East India
- the former Latin Catholic Apostolic Prefecture of Assam, now the Metropolitan Archdiocese of Shillong
