= Robert Milman =

Anglican bishop of Calcutta (1816–1876)

Styles of Robert Milman
- Reference style: The Right Reverend
- Spoken style: My Lord
- Religious style: Bishop

Robert Milman (25 January 1816 – 15 February 1876) was an Anglican bishop in the second half of the 19th century.

He was born at Easton in Gordano, Somerset the third son of Sir William George Milman, 2nd Baronet, of Levaton in Devonshire and was educated as a day-scholar at Westminster School. He entered Exeter College, Oxford where he graduated B.A. in 1838, and M.A and D.D. in 1867.

In 1839 he was ordained in the Anglican ministry as a deacon to the curacy of Winwick, Northamptonshire, and in 1840 was presented a priest in 1840 to the vicarage of Chaddleworth, Berkshire, by the dean and chapter of Westminster, on the nomination of his uncle, then canon of Westminster. There he had daily service and wrote a Life of Tasso and some smaller books. In 1851 he exchanged Chaddleworth for the larger living of Lambourn, also in Berkshire. He served as the vicar of Lambourn, Berkshire from 1851 to 1862 and then as vicar of Great Marlow, Berkshire from 1862 to 1867.

He was appointed as the Bishop of Calcutta in 1867 and moved there with his sister in March of that year. He had been ordained and consecrated to the episcopate at Canterbury Cathedral on the Feast of the Purification (2 February 1867), by Charles Longley, Archbishop of Canterbury. His diocese, which at that date included the Central Provinces, the Punjaub on the west, and British Burma on the east, extended over nearly a million square miles. A fluent linguist, he learnt to speak in Bengali, Hindustani, Hindi, and several related dialects.

His sister Maria and his curate's sister Angelina Margaret Hoare founded St. John's Diocesan Girls' Higher Secondary School.

He caught a chill when travelling from Calcutta to Peshawur and died at Rawul Pindi in February 1876. He had never married.

He was the author of a number of publications:

- Life of Tasso, 2 volumes, 1848.
- The Way through the Desert, 1850.
- Mediations of Confirmation (a Tract), 3 editions.
- Love of the Atonement, 2 editions.

Church of England titles
Preceded by George Edward Lynch Cotton	Bishop of Calcutta; 1866–1876	Succeeded by Edward Ralph Johnson
