= John Banerjee =

The Right Reverend J. S. C. Banerjee
- Assistant Bishop of Lahore
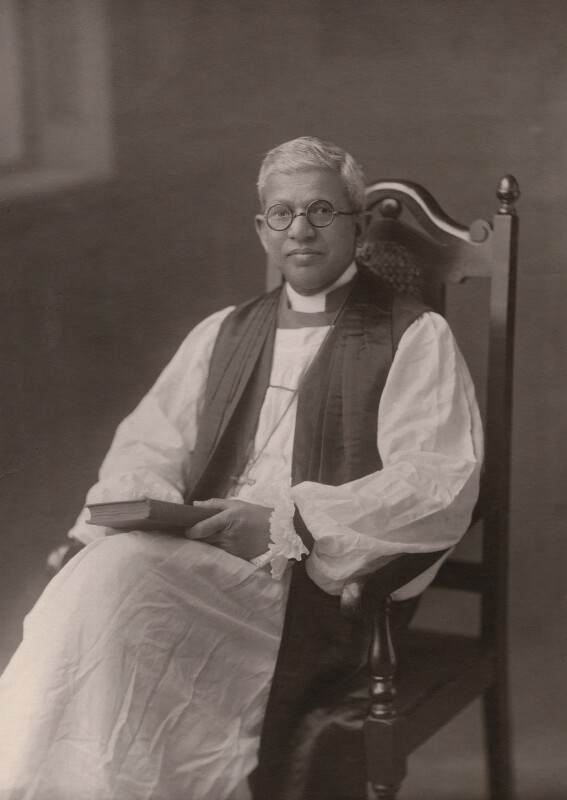
- Photographic portrait, early 20th century

Orders
- Ordination: Deacon, 1902. Priest, 1904.
- Consecration: 25 October 1931

Personal details
- Born: 22 June 1873 Allahabad, British India
- Died: 9 July 1957 (aged 84)
- Denomination: Anglican

John Sharat Chandra Banerjee (22 June 1873 – 9 July 1957) was an Anglican assistant bishop in Lahore. He was the second non-European bishop of the Church of India, Burma and Ceylon.

== Early life and career ==
Banerjee was born in Allahabad. He was the son of a Brahmin convert to Christianity from Bengal, Janki Nath Banerjee. He attended St. John's College in Agra and graduated from Allahabad University with a B.A. in 1900. He was ordained a deacon in 1902 and a priest in 1904. Banerjee served as a Church Mission Society missionary in Lucknow from 1902 through 1931. He was made a canon of Lucknow in 1920.

== Bishop ==
On 25 October 1931, Canon Banerjee was consecrated a bishop at the Cathedral Church of the Resurrection, Lahore to serve there as assistant bishop. The consecrators were the Bishop of Calcutta, the Bishop of Lahore and the Bishop of Lucknow. Bishop Banerjee was the second non-European bishop consecrated for the Anglican Communion in British India, after Bishop Azariah.

Bishop Banerjee visited Australia in 1936 on the occasion of the centennial of Bishop Broughton where he was presented as Metropolitan of India and delivered a series of notable speeches.

A photographic portrait of Bishop Banerjee is in the collection of the National Portrait Gallery, London.

== Personal life ==
Banerjee married in 1902. As of 1945, he had five sons and one daughter. His son John married Gwendolen Pearson, a Welsh missionary who had been a member of the Zenana Bible and Medical Mission.
