= Joseph Amritanand =

20th-century Bishop of Calcutta

Joseph Amritanand was Bishop of Calcutta in the mid 20th century. He was consecrated a bishop on Pentecost day (5 June), by George Hubback, Bishop of Calcutta, at St Paul's Cathedral, Calcutta and served as Bishop of Assam until 1962, when he translated to Lucknow in 1962, then under the Church of India, Pakistan, Burma and Ceylon (1948–1970). He was the first Bishop of Calcutta after the 1970 establishment of the Church of North India.
