= Nirod Biswas =

Nirod Kumar Biswas was Bishop of Assam in the mid 20th century.

== Notes ==
Church of England titles
Preceded by George Hubback	Bishop of Assam; 1946–1948	Succeeded by Joseph Amritanand as Bishop of North India
