= John Turner (bishop) =

British Anglican colonial bishop

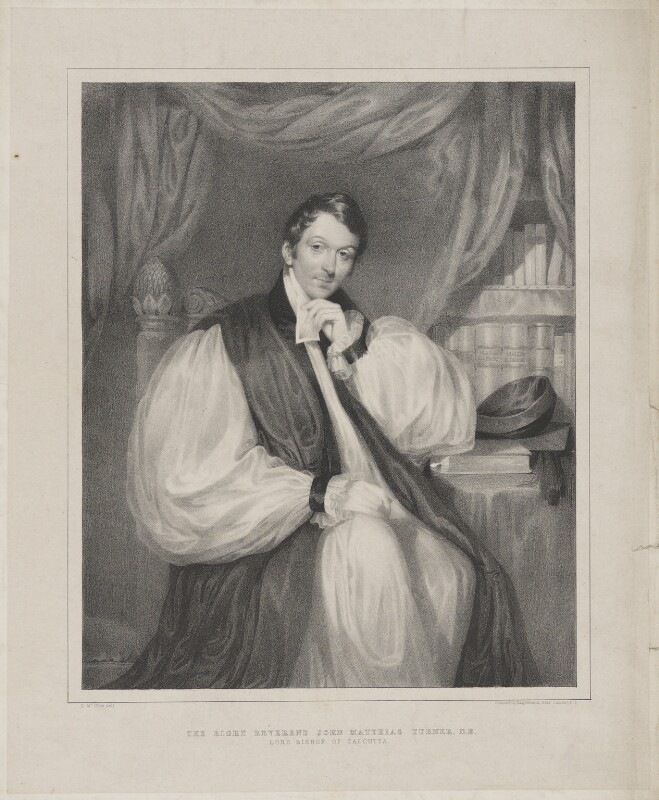
John Matthias Turner

John Matthias Turner (1786–1831) was an eminent Anglican priest in the first half of the 19th century.

He was the son of Thomas Turner of Oxford, and matriculated at Christ Church, Oxford in 1801, aged 15, graduating B.A, in 1804 and M.A. in 1807. He became Vicar of Abingdon then Rector of Wilmslow before being appointed to the episcopate as Bishop of Calcutta in 1829. He died in post in the summer of 1831 and was interred on 8 July; he had become a Doctor of Divinity (DD)

Anglican Communion titles
Preceded by Thomas James	Bishop of Calcutta; 1829–1831	Succeeded by Daniel Wilson
