= Aurobindo Nath Mukherjee =

Indian bishop

Aurobindo Nath Mukherjee, officially The Most Reverend Aurobindo Nath Mukherjee (1882 – 1970), was an Indian and Bengali speaking leader of the erstwhile Anglican denomination, known as the Church of India, Pakistan, Burma and Ceylon (1948–1970), which merged with other Protestant denominations to form the Church of North India. He was the fourteenth Bishop of Calcutta and the tenth Metropolitan of India. He was also the first Indian to be either the Bishop of Calcutta or the Metropolitan of India.

== Early life and education ==
He was born in Calcutta in 1882 and was educated in the St. Paul’s Cathedral Mission College and the Scottish Church College, both within the University of Calcutta. He graduated in 1914 and obtained a degree in theology in 1917. He was ordained in 1923.

== Career ==
When the Church of India, Pakistan, Burma and Ceylon's diocese of Delhi was established in 1947, he was serving as the assistant Bishop of Lahore. He its first bishop of Delhi and in 1950, when Bishop George Hubback, the last Englishman to serve as Metropolitan of India resigned, Bishop Mukherjee succeeded him as the first Indian Metropolitan. He would serve in this capacity till his death in 1970.

== Evaluation ==
His contribution in strengthening and reorganizing the diocese and the Church of India was crucial in the dawn of independent India.
