= St. Paul's Cathedral, Kolkata =

Cathedral of the Diocese of Calcutta

St. Paul's Cathedral
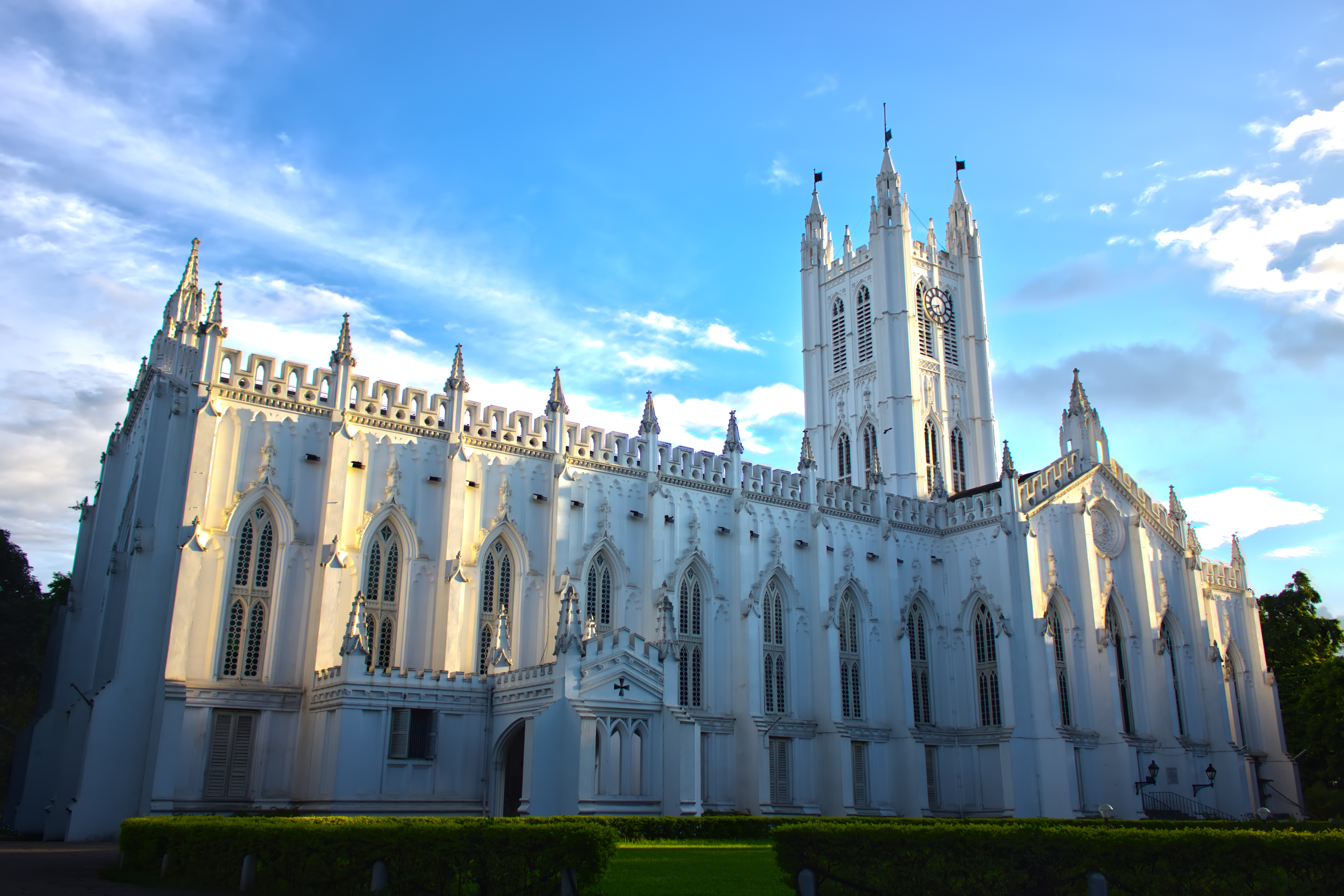
- North façade of the St. Paul's Cathedral, Kolkata
- St. Paul's Cathedral
- 22°32′39″N 88°20′48″E
- Location: 1A, Cathedral Road, Kolkata – 71
- Country: India
- Denomination: Church of North India
- Churchmanship: High Church

History
- Status: Cathedral
- Founded: 1847; 179 years ago
- Founder: Bishop Daniel Wilson
- Dedication: Paul the Apostle

Architecture
- Functional status: Active
- Designated: 1847
- Architect(s): William Nairn Forbes, C. K. Robinson
- Architectural type: Aisleless church
- Style: Indo-Gothic, Gothic Revival
- Groundbreaking: 1839
- Completed: 1847; 179 years ago
- Construction cost: Rs. 4,35,669

Specifications
- Length: 247 feet (75 m)
- Width: 81 feet (25 m)
- Materials: Special bricks, steel trusses, and fine lime plaster

Administration
- Diocese: Diocese of Calcutta

Clergy
- Bishop: The Rt. Revd. Dr. Paritosh Canning

St. Paul's Cathedral is a Church of North India (CNI) cathedral of Anglican background in Kolkata, West Bengal, India, noted for its Gothic architecture and dedicated to Paul the Apostle. It is the seat of the Diocese of Calcutta. The cornerstone was laid in 1839; the building was completed in 1847. It is said to be the largest church in Kolkata and the first Anglican cathedral in Asia. It was also the first new-built cathedral in the overseas territory of the British Empire. The edifice stands on Cathedral Road on the "island of attractions," the site was chosen to provide for more space for the growing population of the European community in Calcutta in the 1800s.

The architectural design of the cathedral is "Indo-Gothic", a Gothic architectural style designed to meet the climate of India. Following the 1897 earthquake and the subsequent massive earthquake of 1934, when Calcutta suffered substantial damage, the cathedral was reconstructed to a revised design. The cathedral complex has a library over the western porch and a display of plastic art forms and memorabilia.

Apart from that of Bishop Daniel Wilson, the founder of the cathedral, the other notable burial in the church is that of John Paxton Norman, an acting Chief Justice who was assassinated on the steps of Kolkata Town Hall in 1871.

== Location ==
The cathedral is across from the Bishop's House at 51, Chowringhee Road, in a direct line of sight from the Victoria Memorial. The cathedral is located to the east of the Victoria Memorial and at the southern edge of the maidan, the largest open space in the city.

The building stands on Cathedral Road, on the "island of attractions" in Kolkata, along with the Victoria Memorial, Nandan, Rabindra Sadan theatre complex and the Birla Planetarium.

== History ==
The cathedral was built to replace St. John's Church, which had become too small for Calcutta's growing European community; by 1810 there were 4,000 British men and 300 British women in Bengal.

In 1819, at the request of Francis Rawdon-Hastings, 1st Marquess of Hastings – then Governor-General of Bengal – Royal Engineers officer William Nairn Forbes produced a design for the proposed cathedral; however, it was not accepted as it was deemed too expensive to build. Bishop Middleton suggested as a site for the new cathedral the part of the city now known as "Fives Court", where the cathedral now stands. In 1762 the area had been described as a forest so wild that it harbored tigers and at first it was regarded as "too far south" to serve as a location for the cathedral. Middleton died in 1822 before building plans took shape. The next three bishops – Reginald Heber, Thomas James and John Turner – all died after brief tenures, and it was not until 1832, under Bishop Daniel Wilson, that the project to build the cathedral was revived.

Following acquisition of 7 acres (3 ha) of land to build the cathedral, a Cathedral Committee was set up to build it. The military engineer, Major William Nairn Forbes (1796–1855) (who later became a Major-General in the Bengal Engineers), at the request of Bishop Wilson, designed the cathedral with the assistance of architect C. K. Robinson, modelling the tower and spire on Norwich Cathedral.

On 8 October 1839, construction was initiated by laying the cornerstone. The cathedral was completed after eight years and consecrated on 8 October 1847. The consecration ceremony, to mark which Queen Victoria had sent "ten pieces of silver-gilt plate" for the cathedral, was largely attended by Europeans and local people. The cathedral was built in Gothic revival style, but with modern construction elements, including an iron framework. It was built with a chancel, a sanctuary, chapels and a 201 feet (61 m) tall spire; the cost of construction of the edifice was then Rs. 4,35,669. The cathedral can accommodate 800 to 1,000 people.

In the 1897 earthquake the cathedral suffered damage and was refurbished. In the subsequent massive earthquake of 1934, when Calcutta was devastated, the cathedral's steeple tower collapsed. It was reconstructed to a revised design. Following the 1934 Calcutta earthquake, the tower was rebuilt along the lines of the central Bell Harry tower of Canterbury Cathedral. On its completion, St. Paul's replaced St. John's Church as the cathedral. The cathedral also has a statue of Bishop Heber (1783–1826), Second Bishop of Calcutta; the statue was sculpted by Francis Leggatt Chantrey. The Bishop's House across the street is also architecturally notable.

The cathedral is well maintained in a serene and peaceful atmosphere. People of all religious denominations can visit the church. Service is held regularly. Christmas is a special occasion when a large number of people assemble to participate in the festivities.

== Features ==
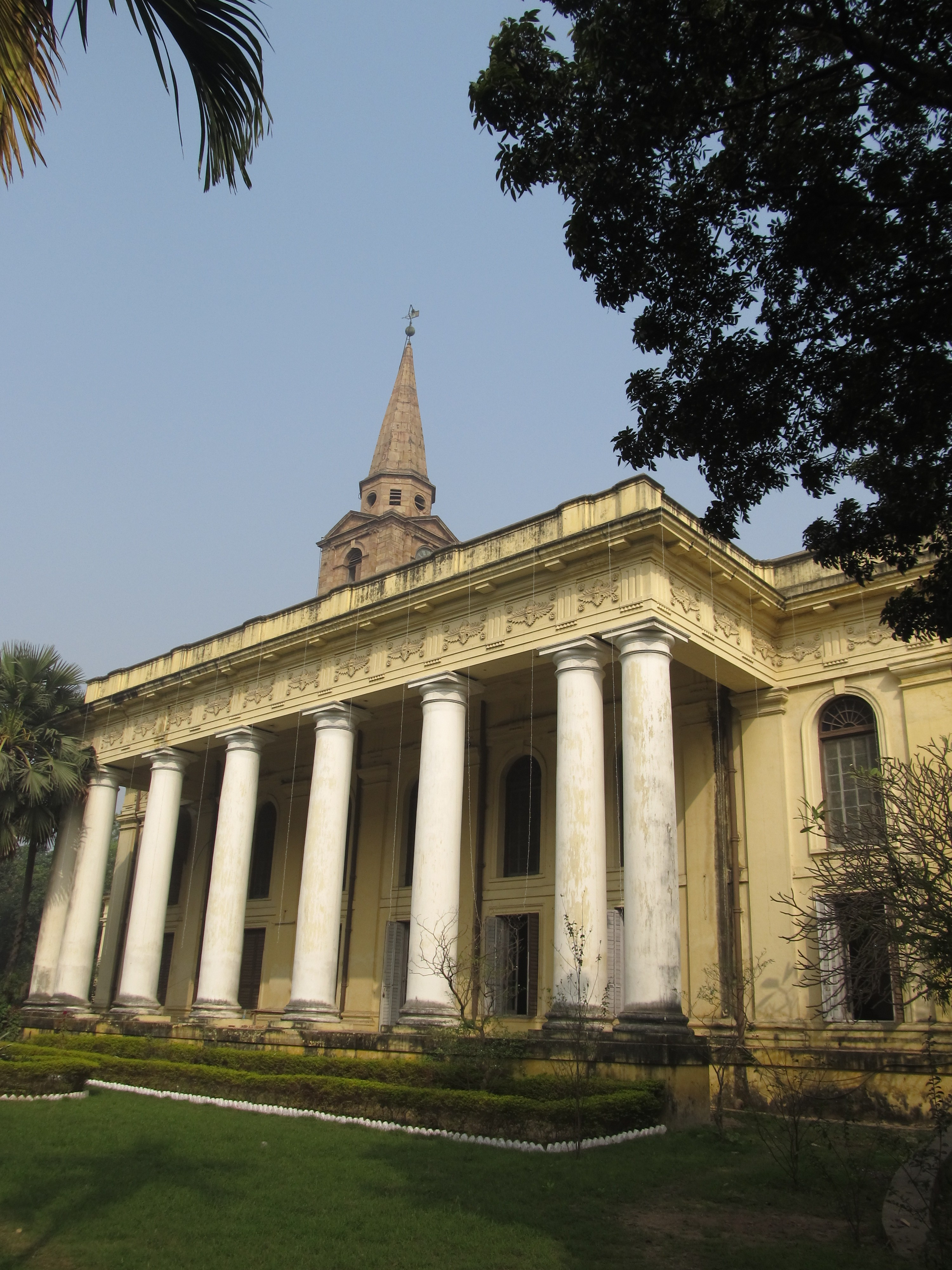
St. Paul's church replaced St. John's Church, Kolkata (shown above) as the cathedral

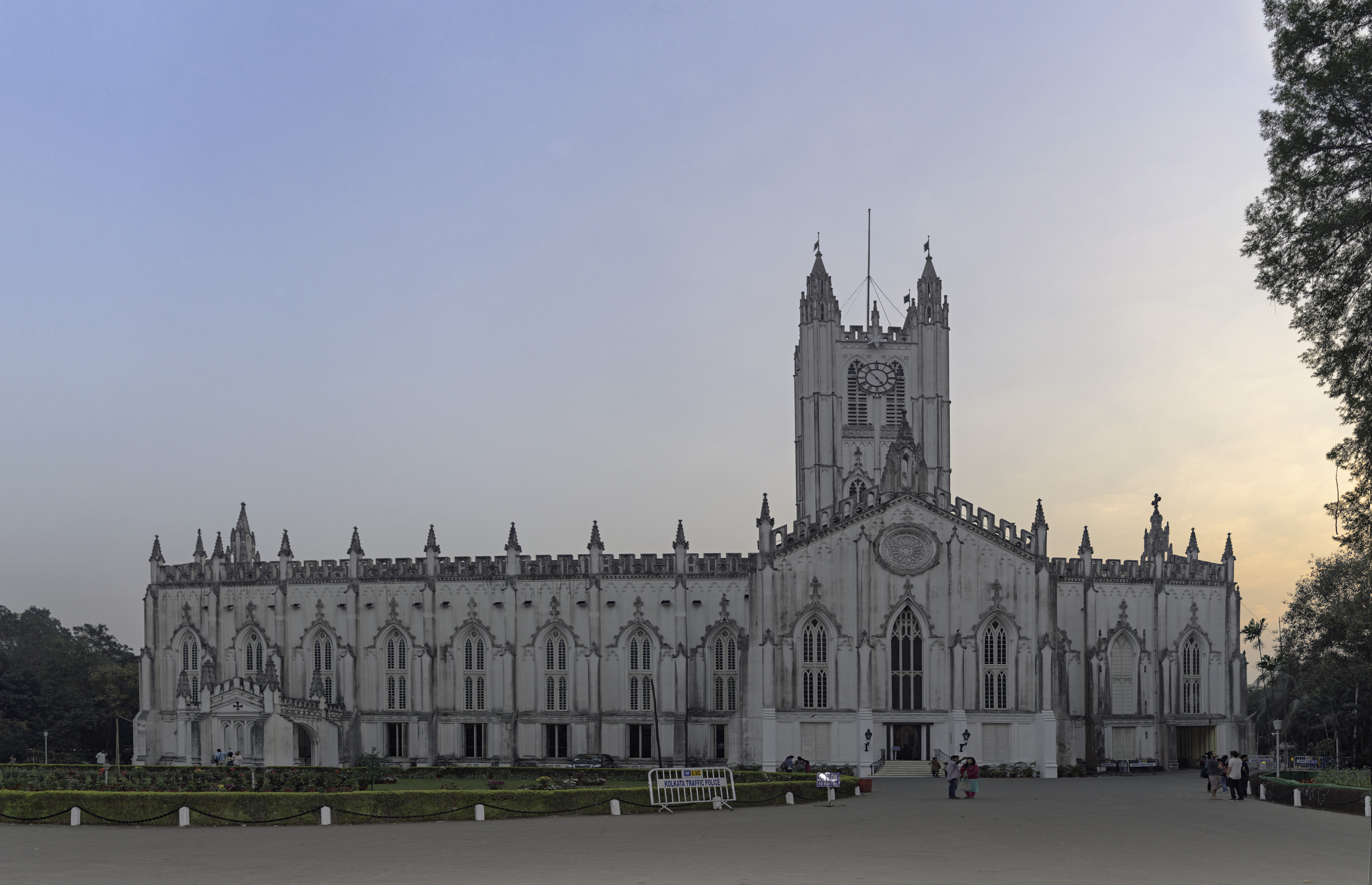
St. Paul's Cathedral, north façade

The Imperial Gazetteer defined the architectural design of the cathedral as "Indo-Gothic", to mean a Gothic architectural style built to meet the climatic conditions of India. It was also called a "spurious gothic adapted to the exigencies of the Indian climate." The cathedral's design, otherwise known as Gothic Revival style, includes three stained-glass windows and two frescoes in the Florentine Renaissance style; the West Window was created by Morris & Co. to a design by Sir Edward Burne-Jones. The nave of the cathedral is very long at 247 feet (75 m), and its width is 81 feet (25 m). The nave is fitted with well-crafted wooden pews and chairs. The central spire rises to a height of 201 feet (61 m), and the tower on which it stands is square in shape and was patterned on the lines of the 12th-century Canterbury Cathedral, England. The tower was fitted with five clocks, each of which weighed about three tons. The stained-glass windows on the western side were the creation of Sir Edward Burne-Jones, a pre-Raphaelite master, which were fitted in half-sunk arches; these were designed in 1880 in memory of Lord Mayo who was assassinated in the Andaman Islands.

When completed in 1847, the cathedral as a whole was compared to Norwich Cathedral in England. The East window, which had original stained glass, was destroyed by a cyclone in 1964. It was replaced with a new one in 1968. The roof of the cathedral (it was the largest span when built) is in the shape of a shallow curve arching over iron trusses decorated with Gothic tracery. The nave of the cathedral is built spaciously without any aisles on its flanks. The materials used in the construction of the cathedral consisted of special bricks, light in weight and with good compression strength. The ashlars used were of Chunar stone. The external and internal surfaces of the cathedral were plastered with fine chunam (lime plaster) in the form of stucco.

The cathedral's interior has a display of many plastic art forms and memorabilia. There is an episcopal throne on the southern flank of the altar and a reredos or decorative wall on its liturgical east end dated to 1879; it has carvings of episodes related to the life of St. Paul, the Annunciation, the Adoration of the Magi, and the Flight into Egypt, all the work of Sir Arthur Blomfield. The parish hall within the premises of the cathedral is the venue for holding social functions. The eastern wall in the cathedral has paintings of the life of St. Paul, painted by Blomfield in 1886. Also notable is the font, with its sculpture of Bishop Heber in a kneeling posture.The Cathedral housed an organ, with 41 stops, made by Henry Willis and Sons of London. It was dismantled and replaced with a reed organ. Following this, the reed organ was replaced with a 1938 Hammond Model E Organ. Currently, the church has and uses a Viscount Vivace 40, a 2 Manual, 31-stop electric organ. It is played by the present organists, Mr. George Sudeep Pande and Mr. Shreejit Saha.

The cathedral complex also has a library, situated over the western porch, to dimensions of 61 by 22 feet (19 m × 7 m) with a height of 35 feet (11 m). It was built at the initiative of Bishop Wilson, who donated 8,000 of his books and manuscripts. Further donations of books to the library were from W. Gordon and Rev. J. Nath of the University of Oxford and the Calcutta Bible Society. The library also has a sculpture of Bishop Wilson made in marble.

Entry to the cathedral is from the north through a large gate made of wrought iron called the Sir William Prentice Memorial Gate, which is named after Sir William Prentice, who was a member of cathedral's congregation for many years. The cathedral is surrounded by a well-tended garden. In 1847, 63 species of trees had been planted in this garden.

== Burials ==
Bishop Daniel Wilson, who had requested burial in the cathedral and also that memorial tablets be placed at St. Paul's Cathedral, in Bishop's College Chapel at Calcutta, and in the St Mary's Church, Islington, lies in an underground chamber of the cathedral, where a plaque conferred on him by Queen Victoria is also on display. Sir John Paxton Norman, an acting Chief Justice who was assassinated, is memorialized by a large, decorated plaque, surmounted by a cross, with an engraving depicting Justice with her scales against a background of tilework flowers evoking Judge Norman's interest in botany. Arthur William Garnett, an English engineer who died in India in 1861, was buried here.

== Picture gallery ==
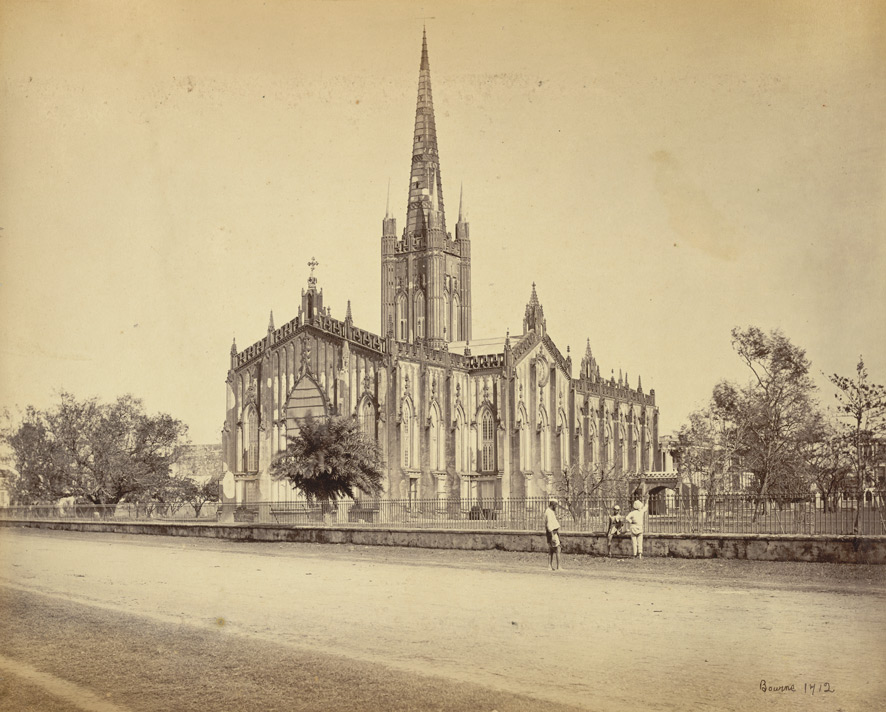
St.Paul's from the southwest in 1865

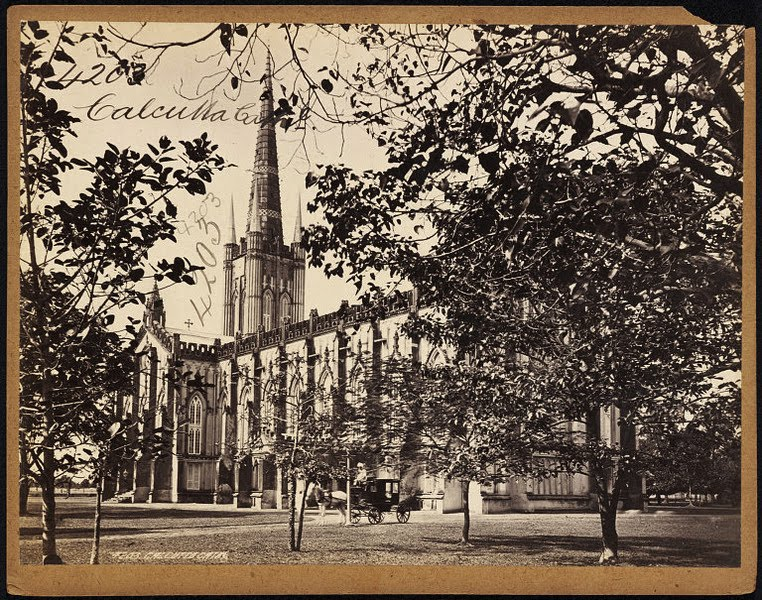
South façade between 1850 and the 1870s

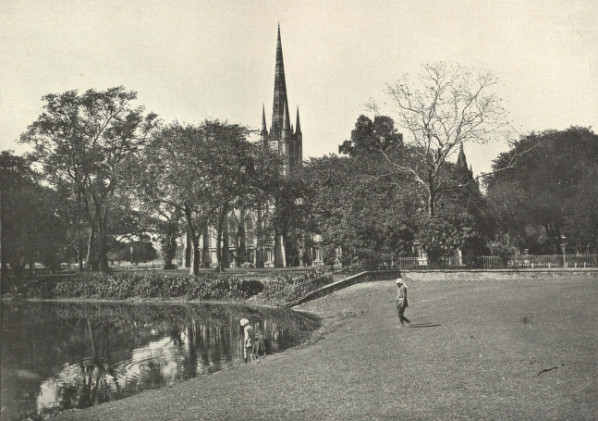
St. Paul's c. 1905

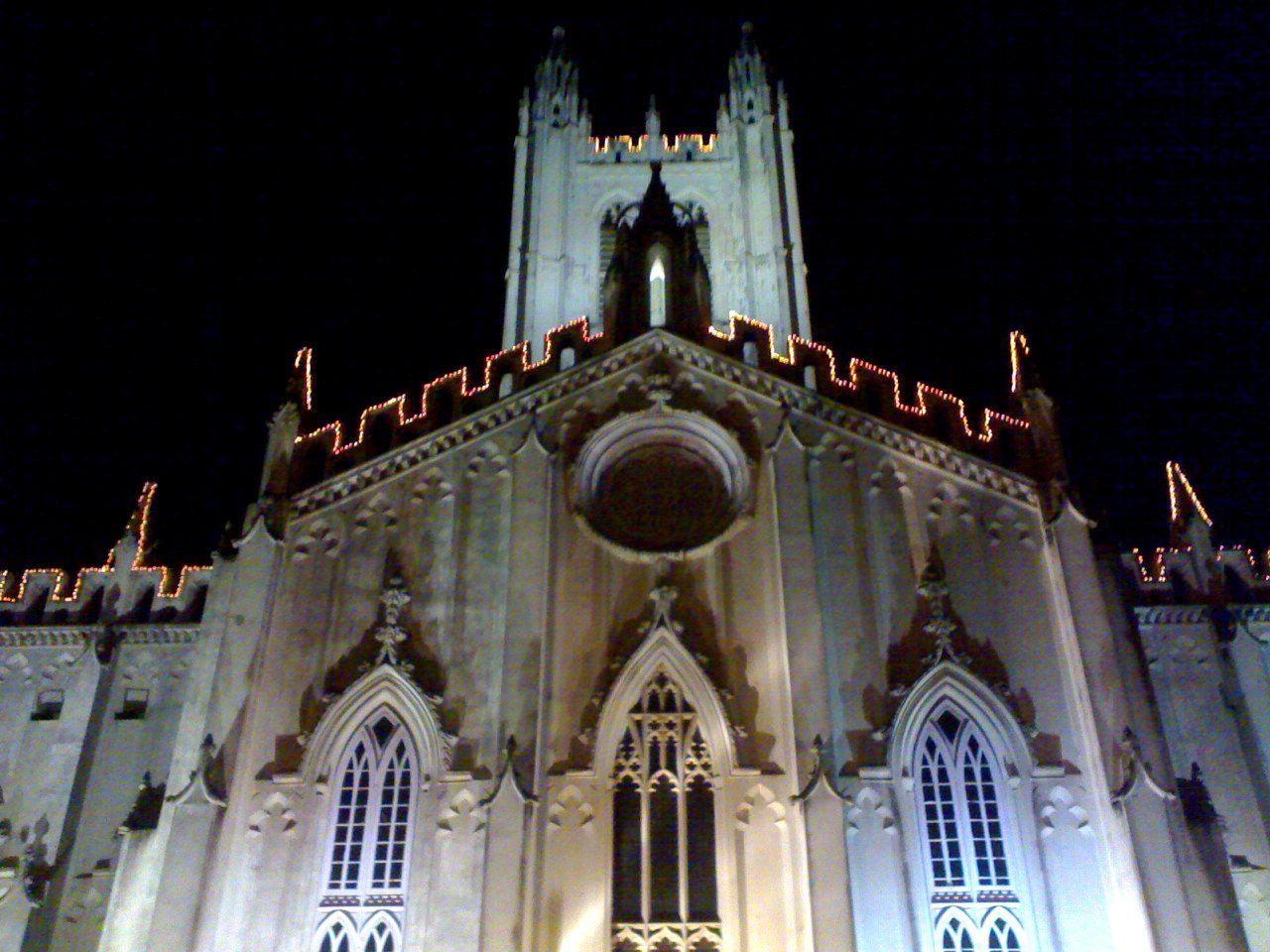
Detail of crossing and tower

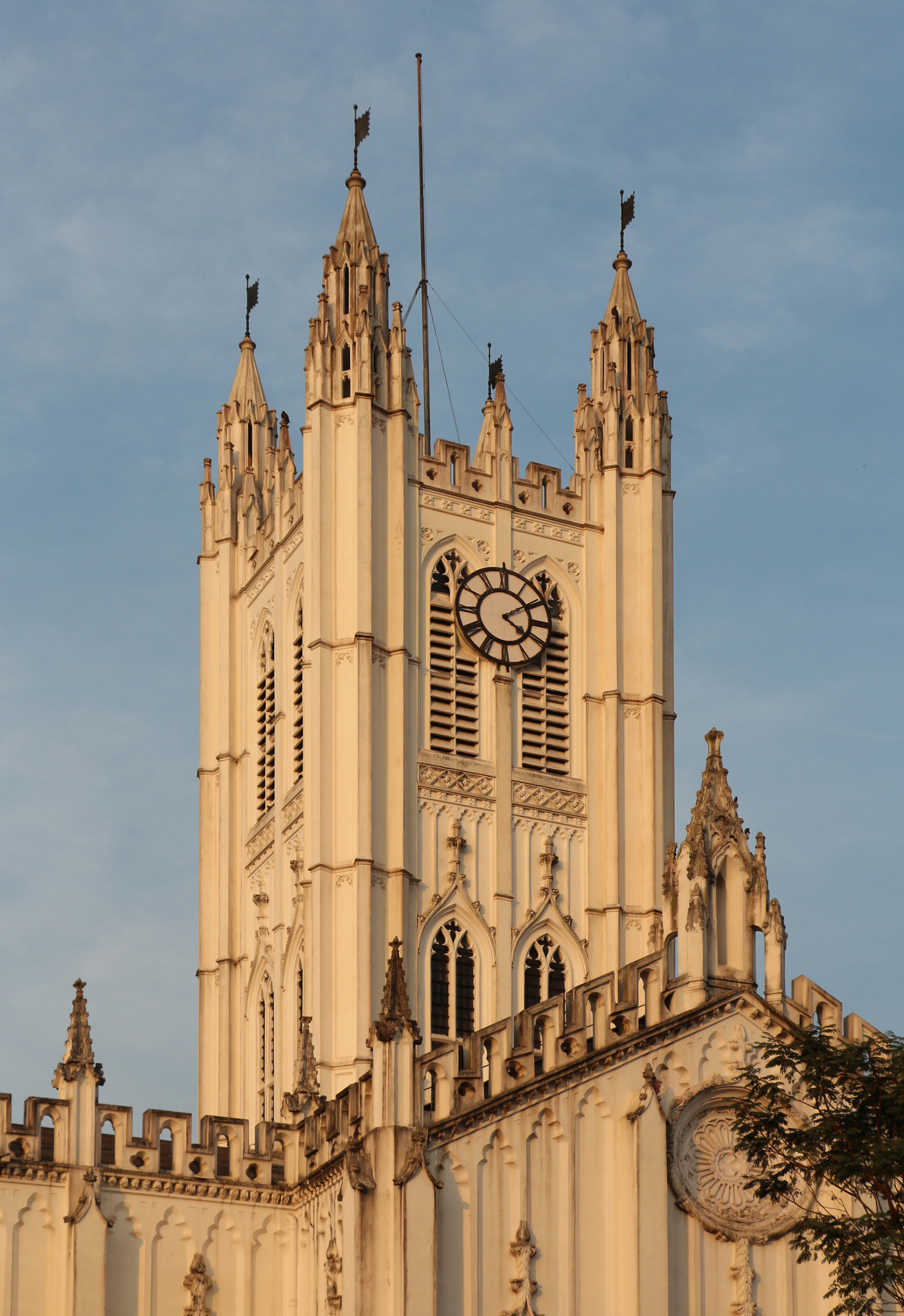
Church tower of St. Paul's

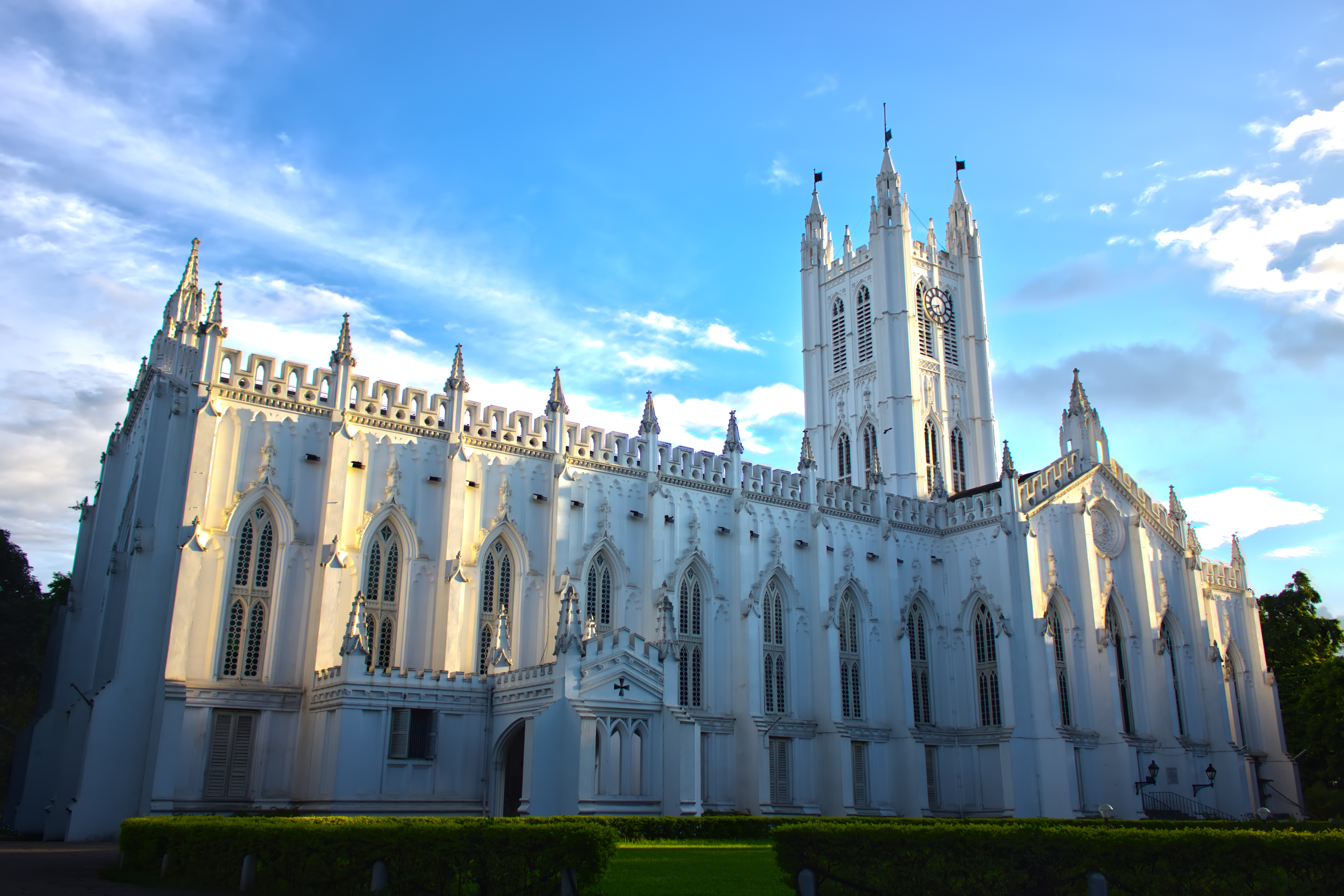
St Paul's from the northeast

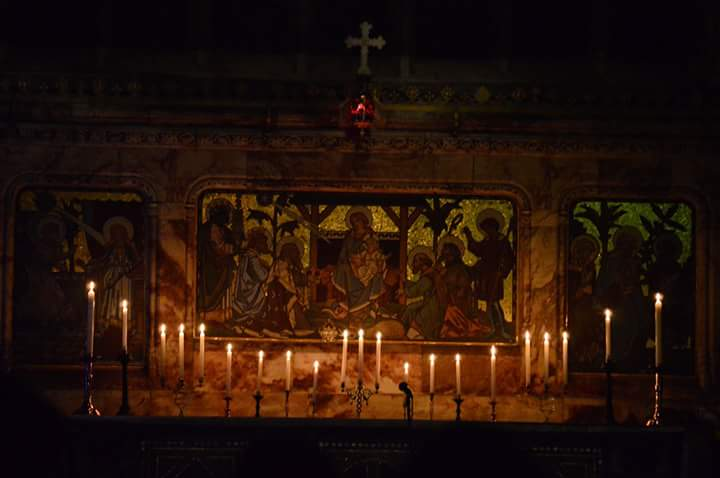
High altar of St. Paul's Cathedral Kolkata, depicting the birth of Jesus Christ.

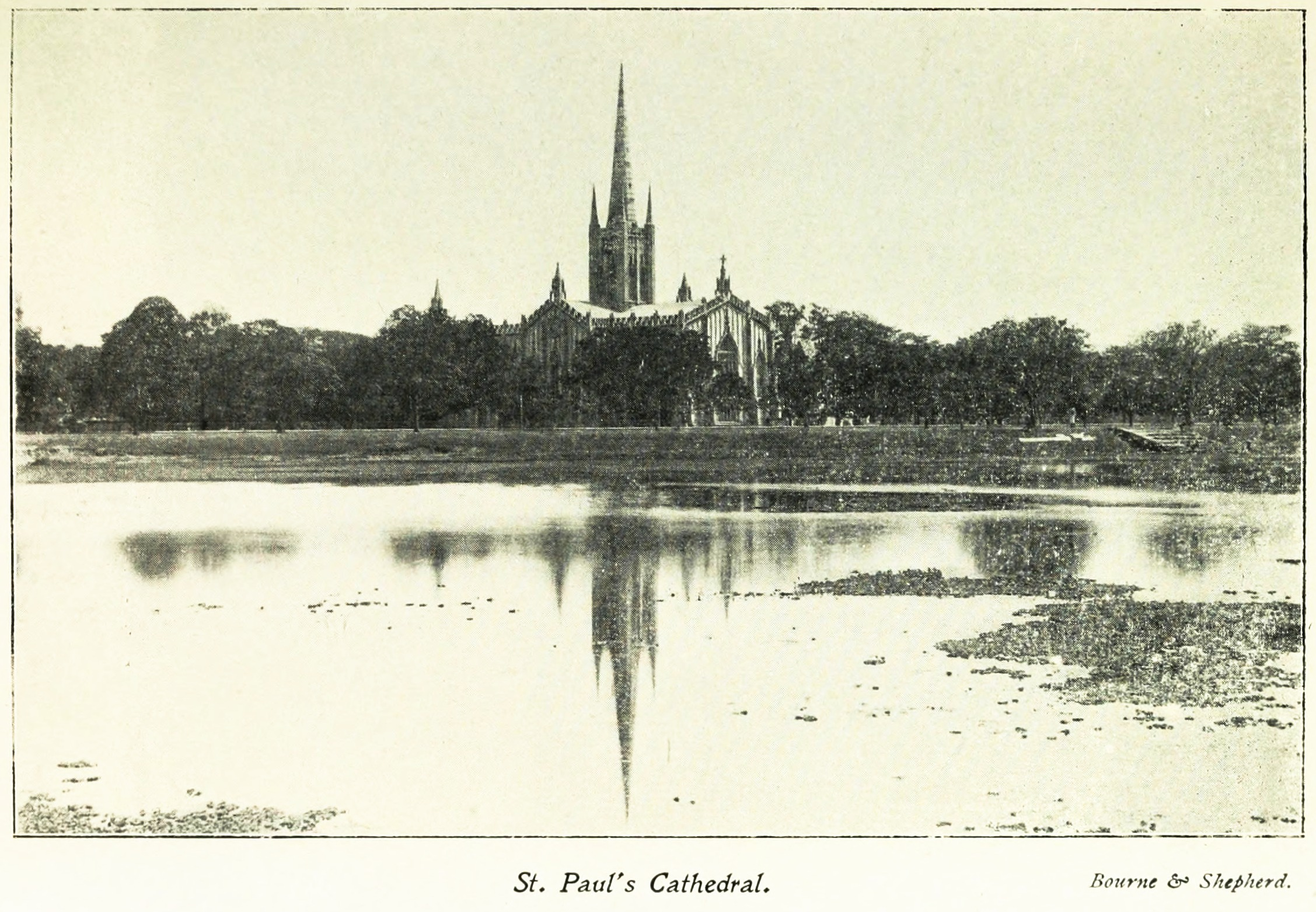
St.Paul's in 1906.

== Bibliography ==
- Bateman, Josiah (1860). The Life of Daniel Wilson, D. D. Bishop of Calcutta and Metropolitan of India. Gould and Lincoln.
- Dutta, Krishna (3 June 2011). Calcutta: A Cultural and Literary History. Andrews UK Limited. ISBN 978-1-904955-87-0.
- Riddick, John F. (1 January 2006). The History of British India: A Chronology. Greenwood Publishing Group. ISBN 978-0-313-32280-8.
- Betts, Vanessa; McCulloch, Victoria (30 October 2013). Delhi to Kolkata Footprint Focus Guide. Footprint Travel Guides. ISBN 978-1-909268-40-1.
- Kolkata: City Guide. Goodearth Publications. 2011. ISBN 978-93-80262-15-4.
