= Anne Woodrooffe =

19th-century British writer

- Born: Anne Woodrooffe; 14 July 1766
- Died: 24 March 1830 (aged 63)
- Citizenship: British
- Occupation: Author
- Notable work: 1824 religious novel Shades of Character
- Children: 2

Anne Woodrooffe (born Anne Cox; 14 July 1766) was a 19th-century British author. She was best known for her 1824 religious novel Shades of Character.

== Life ==
Woodrooffe was born on 14 July 1766. Her father was John Cox of Harwich. She married vicar Nathaniel George Woodrooffe on 27 July 1803. The couple had two children, Emma Martha (b. 30 May 1807) and Thomas Wood (d. 19 December 1865). The 1900 Dictionary of National Biography indicates she died on 24 March 1830, while 1966's Jane Austen and Some Contemporaries indicates her death was in 1850.

The evangelical cleric Daniel Wilson asked Woodrooffe to foster his only daughter, perhaps in 1827 when he was left a widower.

== Works ==
Woodrooffe's first book was a biography, The History of Michael Kemp - the happy farmers lad (1819). She produced a sequel to this volume in 1827, Michael the Married Man. Her primary impact was in the area of moral reform, with her most important book, according to the Dictionary of National Biography, 1824's Shades of Character, which presented a Christian educational system for girls "designed to promote the formation of the female character" through the means of a series of dialogues connected by a slight story. In a similar vein, she authored Cottage Dialogues in 1821, a book which depicted rural life for the pleasure and improvement of the lower classes. 1855 saw the publication of her First Prayer in Verse.
