= Church of India, Burma and Ceylon =

Former ecclesiastical province of Anglican Communion in British India

Church of India, Burma and Ceylon (CIBC) Church of India, Pakistan, Burma and Ceylon (CIPBC)
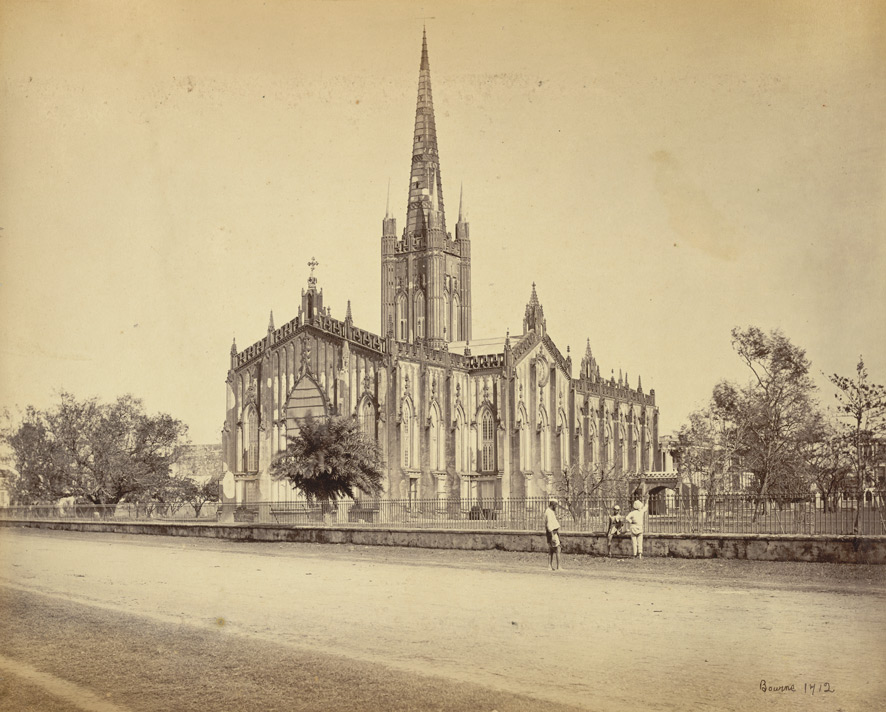
- St. Paul's Cathedral in Calcutta (c. 1865)
- Classification: Protestant
- Orientation: Anglican
- Polity: Episcopal
- Associations: Anglican Communion, World Council of Churches
- Region: Indian Empire (1813-1947); North India & Pakistan (1947-1970)
- Origin: 1813
- Separations: Church of South India (1947)
- Merged into: Church of North India (1970), Church of Pakistan (1970)

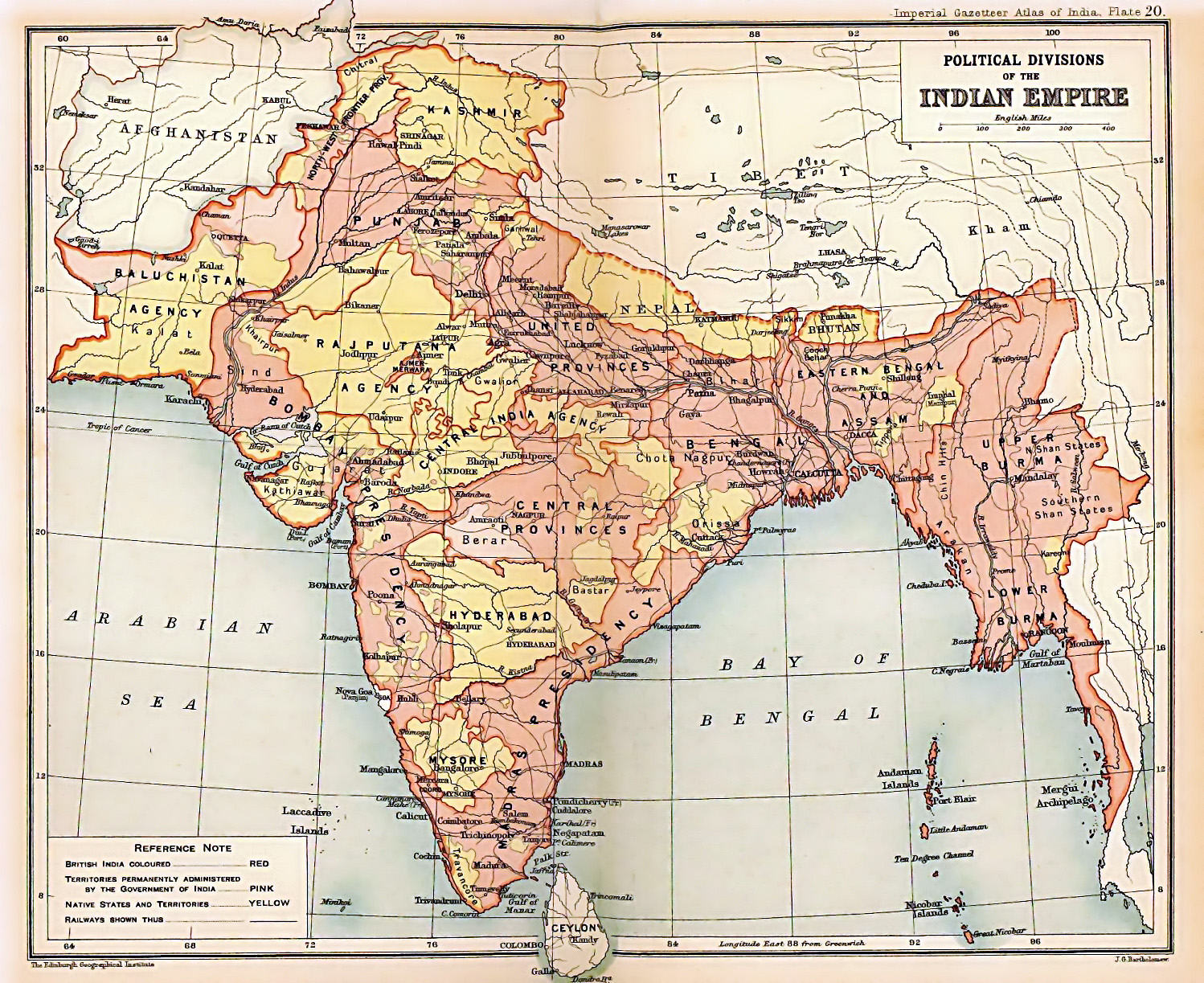
In 1930, the Church of India, Burma and Ceylon (CIBC) had fourteen dioceses across the Indian Empire.

The Church of India, Burma and Ceylon (CIBC) was the autonomous ecclesiastical province of the Anglican Communion, associated with the Church of England, in British India.

The first Anglican diocese in India was established in 1813, the Diocese of Calcutta, which became the metropolitan see of the Church of India, Burma and Ceylon. The Church of India, Burma and Ceylon spread as missionaries from the Church Mission Society travelled throughout the Indian Empire. By 1930, the Church of India, Burma and Ceylon (CIBC) had fourteen dioceses across the Indian Empire. Bishops from India were present at the first Lambeth Conference.

After partition of India in 1947, the Church of India, Burma and Ceylon became known as the Church of India, Pakistan, Burma and Ceylon (CIPBC). It published its own version of the Book of Common Prayer, which served as its authorised liturgical text.

Later in 1947, four southern dioceses left the CIPBC and merged with South Indian Methodists and South Indian Presbyterians & Congregationalists to form the Church of South India. In 1970, ecumenical dialogue led to the merger of the Church of India, Burma and Ceylon in India and Pakistan with other Protestant Christian denominations (including the Scottish Presbyterians, United Methodists and Lutherans), thus creating the Church of North India and Church of Pakistan, and to the creation of separate provinces of Sri Lanka and Burma.

The territory that was formerly part of the CIBC is now under the jurisdiction of the Church of Bangladesh, Church of the Province of Myanmar, Church of North India, Church of Pakistan, Church of South India and Church of Ceylon.

== Dioceses of the CIBC ==
- Diocese of Calcutta (established in 1814)
- Diocese of Madras (established in 1835)
- Diocese of Bombay (established in 1837)
- Diocese of Colombo (established in 1845)
- Diocese of Lahore (established in 1877)
- Diocese of Rangoon (established in 1877)
- Diocese of Travancore (established in 1879)
- Diocese of Chota Nagpur (established in 1890)
- Diocese of Lucknow (established in 1893)
- Diocese of Tinnevelly (established in 1896)
- Diocese of Nagpur (established in 1903)
- Diocese of Dornakal (established in 1912)
- Diocese of Assam (established in 1915)
- Diocese of Nasik (established in 1929)
- Diocese of Delhi (established in 1947), carved from the Diocese of Lahore
- Diocese of Amritsar (established in 1953), carved from the Diocese of Lahore
- Diocese of Barrackpore (established in 1956), carved from the Diocese of Calcutta
- Diocese of Andaman and Nicobar (established in 1966), from Diocese of Calcutta

== Continuing CIPBC ==
Some elements in the CIPBC refused mergers with Lutherans, Presbyterians, Congregationalists, Methodists and Baptists. In 1948, part of the diocese of Nandyal opposed the union. At the 1958 Lambeth Council, a resolution was passed to allow the Church of India, Pakistan, Burma, and Ceylon in Nandyal to manage their own affairs independently from the Church of South India.

The Anglican Church of India under the Ecclesiastical Province of the Church of India, Pakistan and Ceylon as per decision of the General Council held on 2 to 4 January 1970, under the Chairmanship of the Most Rev. Lakdasa De Mel at Calcutta agreed to merge the CIPBC with the united Church of North India. Many Anglicans had opposed the Church Union and did not follow its principles. The leaders who led the revival of the Anglican Church of India were staunch members of the Anglican Church. Some of the senior leaders of congregations were Andrew Prakash, E.D. Theophilus, Samuel P. Prakash, Robinson Paul, R.B. James, C.T. Gideon, Rev. E.J. Gideon, Ghulam Masih, Anderson Frank, Daniel Masih and some Anglican Priests were Rev. Jai Singh Thakore, Rev. John A. Prakash, Rev. Stanly Hague, and Rev. C.L. Prasad who had taken early retirement from their services and continued as Anglican Priests to serve Anglican congregations.

In 1978, news of the Congress of St. Louis and the creation of the Anglican Catholic Church reached India. The Indian Anglicans appealed for a spiritual affiliation in the Anglican Catholic Church - Original Province. As a result, in 1983, Bishop John Asha Prakash was consecrated in California in United States. And subsequently in the year 1984 Bishop Samuel Peter Prakash son of John Asha Prakash along with Bishop Gideon from Calcutta and Bishop Rao from Amritsar. The consecration took place in WMCA, New Delhi. With these four dioceses the Province of India was restored and established as the Second Province of the Anglican Catholic Church. In 1989 The Diocese of Bombay consecrated Bishop Anselm Ranganadhan, and in 1996, the Diocese of Nagpur was restored and Bishop Francis Sylvestor consecrated there.

Following the controversial consecrations in Deerfield Beach, Florida, the Titular Bishop of Calcutta and Metropolitan of India, Archbishop Louis Falk, left the Anglican Catholic Church in 1991. The Bishop of Delhi and Lucknow, John Prakash, and his son, Samuel Prakash, left as well, together with a number of clergy and congregations associated with Anthony Clavier, who had also been active in India. They formed the church known as the "Anglican Church of India". Samuel Prakash is currently the Metropolitan of the Anglican Church of India - CIPBC, which is a member of worldwide Traditional Anglican Church.

For the churches that remained in the Anglican Catholic Church, from 1991 until 1995 the late Archbishop William Lewis held office as Acting Metropolitan of India, later succeeded by Bishop James Bromley. Bishop Bromley appointed Samuel P Praksh as the Archdeacon and the Metropolitan’s Commissary to the Province of India. Bishop Rommie Starks succeeded Bishop Bromley as acting Metropolitan. In 2003, the Right Reverend Samuel P Praksh was elected and consecrated Bishop of Lucknow. In 2005, the Calcutta Diocesan Council and the House of Bishops elected the Right Reverend Samuel P Praksh as the Bishop of Calcutta and Metropolitan of India. The Most Reverend Samuel P Praksh was enthroned as Metropolitan of the Church of India-CIPBC on 24 February 2005 at Christ Church, Lucknow.

CIPBC rescinded Communion between 2014 and 2018 with the Anglican Catholic Church over matters relating to the status of the second province. In 2018, Archbishop Mark Haverland and Most Rev. Samuel P Praksh, Metropolitan of the CIPBC, signed an agreement restoring communio in sacris.

A different Anglican Church of India is located in South India and was founded by V. J. Stephen in 1966.

== See also ==
- Christianity in India
- Christianity in Pakistan
- Christianity in Ceylon
- Christianity in Burma
