= Thomas Middleton (bishop) =

Bishop of Calcutta

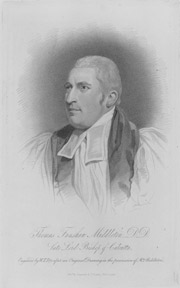
Portrait of Bishop Middleton, c. 1824

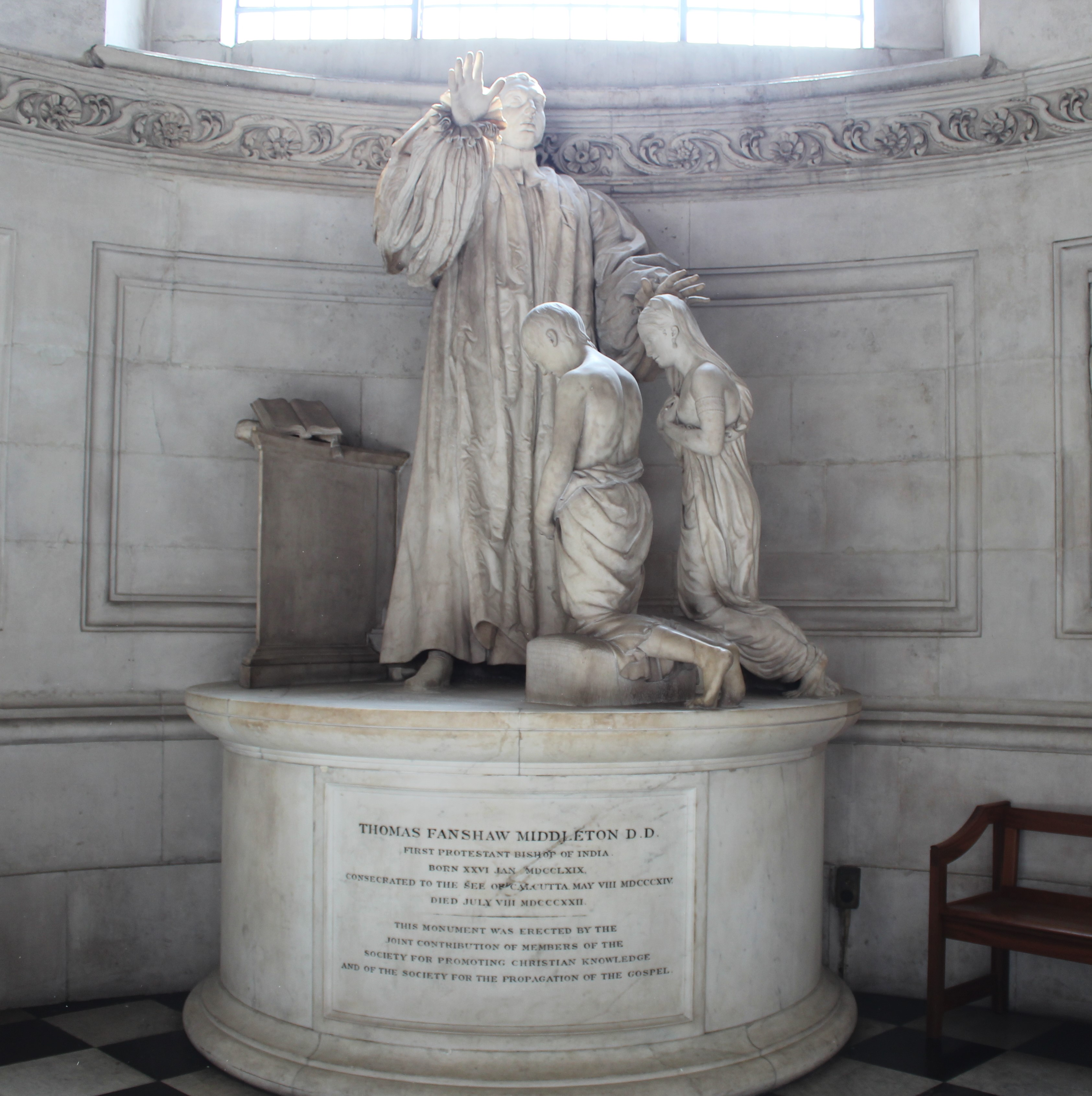
Middleton memorial, St Paul's Cathedral

Thomas Fanshaw Middleton (28 January 1769 – 8 July 1822) was a noted Anglican bishop.

== Life ==
Middleton was born in Kedleston in Derbyshire, England, the son of Thomas Middleton, Rector of Kedleston and educated at Christ's Hospital. He then went up to Pembroke College, Cambridge, and on graduation was ordained in the Church of England. He was appointed curate of Gainsborough (1792), Rector of Tansor (1795), Rector of Bytham (1802), Prebendary of Lincoln (1809), Archdeacon of Huntingdon and Vicar of St Pancras.

In 1814, Middleton became the first Bishop of Calcutta. This diocese included not just India, but the entire territory of the British East India Company (EIC). When he arrived in India he found that he was not allowed to ordain "Natives of India", as all ordinations were carried out by the EIC in London. In response, he founded Bishop's College in Calcutta, which admitted Britons Indians and Anglo-Indians, some of whom could go on to ordination. However although the college was built for seventy students, they still only had eight students fourteen years after it opened.

In May 1814, Middleton was elected a Fellow of the Royal Society on the basis of being "a Gentleman well known to the literary world as the author of several classical works, and conversant with various departments of science"

He died in Calcutta of sunstroke on 8 July 1822 and is buried under the altar of St. John's Church, the then cathedral of Calcutta. There is also a memorial to him in St Paul's Cathedral. Middleton Row, just of Park Street was named after him.

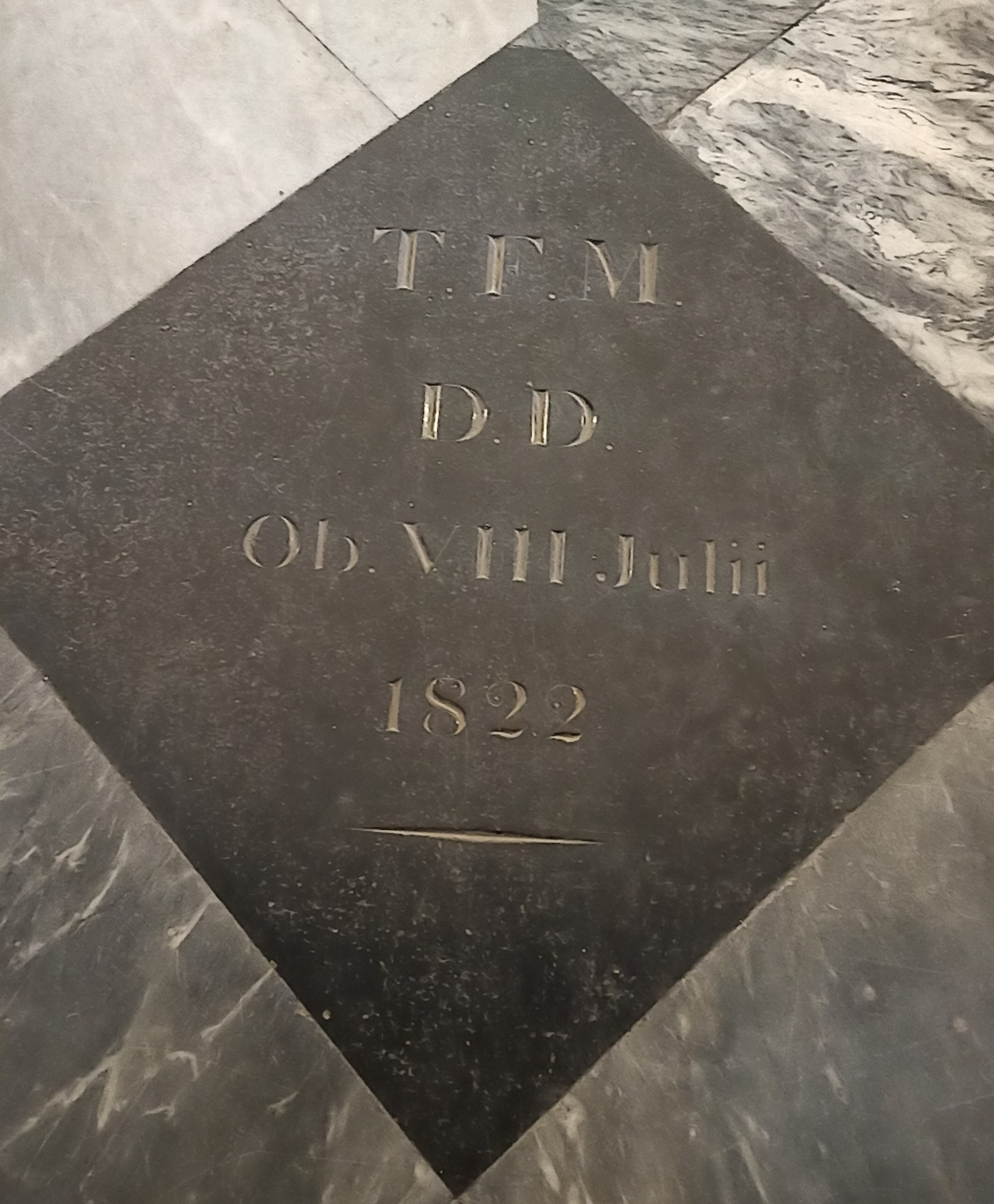
Burial place of Bishop Thomas Fanshaw Middleton at the St John's Church Altar

== Works ==
- The Doctrine of the Greek Article Applied to the Criticism and Illustration of the New Testament (1841)
