= Herbert Pakenham-Walsh =

Herbert Pakenham-Walsh (1871–1959) was an Anglican bishop, educator, scholar and lyricist.

Pakenham-Walsh was the third son of William Pakenham-Walsh, Anglican Bishop of Ossory, Ferns and Leighlin in Ireland from 1878 until 1897. He received a doctorate in divinity from Trinity College, Dublin. In 1916, he married Clara Hayes. He was a missionary at Bangalore, India from 1907 to 1908.

He was warden of Bishop Cotton Boys' School in Bangalore, Karnataka, India from 1907 until 1913. In 1915, he became the first Bishop of Assam when the diocese of Assam was created out of part of the territory of the diocese of Calcutta.

== Books ==
- Lights and shades of Christendom to A. D. 1000. Oxford University Press, 1936. LCCN 36-13343
- The Antiphonal Psalter. pp. viii. 342. Diocesan Press: Madras, 1929.
- Divine Healing. Society for Promoting Christian Knowledge (SPCK), 1922,
- Daily Services for Schools and Colleges. pp. vi. 142. Longmans & Co.: London, 1914 8º.
- Altar and Table. (Addresses.). pp. 66. S.P.C.K.: London, 1920.
- The Epistles of St. John (The Indian church commentaries). 1910
- The appeal of Assam: Being an interpretation of the mission and church statistics (Protestant) for 1921-2. 1922.
- Three Psalms from the Antiphonal Psalter. London : S.P.C.K, [1930]
- Evolution & Christianity. pp. 86. Christian Literature Society: London, 1907.
- A devotional study of the Holy Qurbana

== Chapters and articles ==
- Pakenham-Walsh, Herbert 'The Christa Sishya Sanga', East and West Review, Vol. III, 1937.
- The Epistles of St. John. In: Bible. [New Testament. English.] The Indian Church Commentaries, etc. 1919, etc. 8º.

Church of England titles
New diocese	Bishop of Assam; 1915–1924	Succeeded by George Hubback
