= Thomas James (bishop) =

Anglican bishop of Calcutta

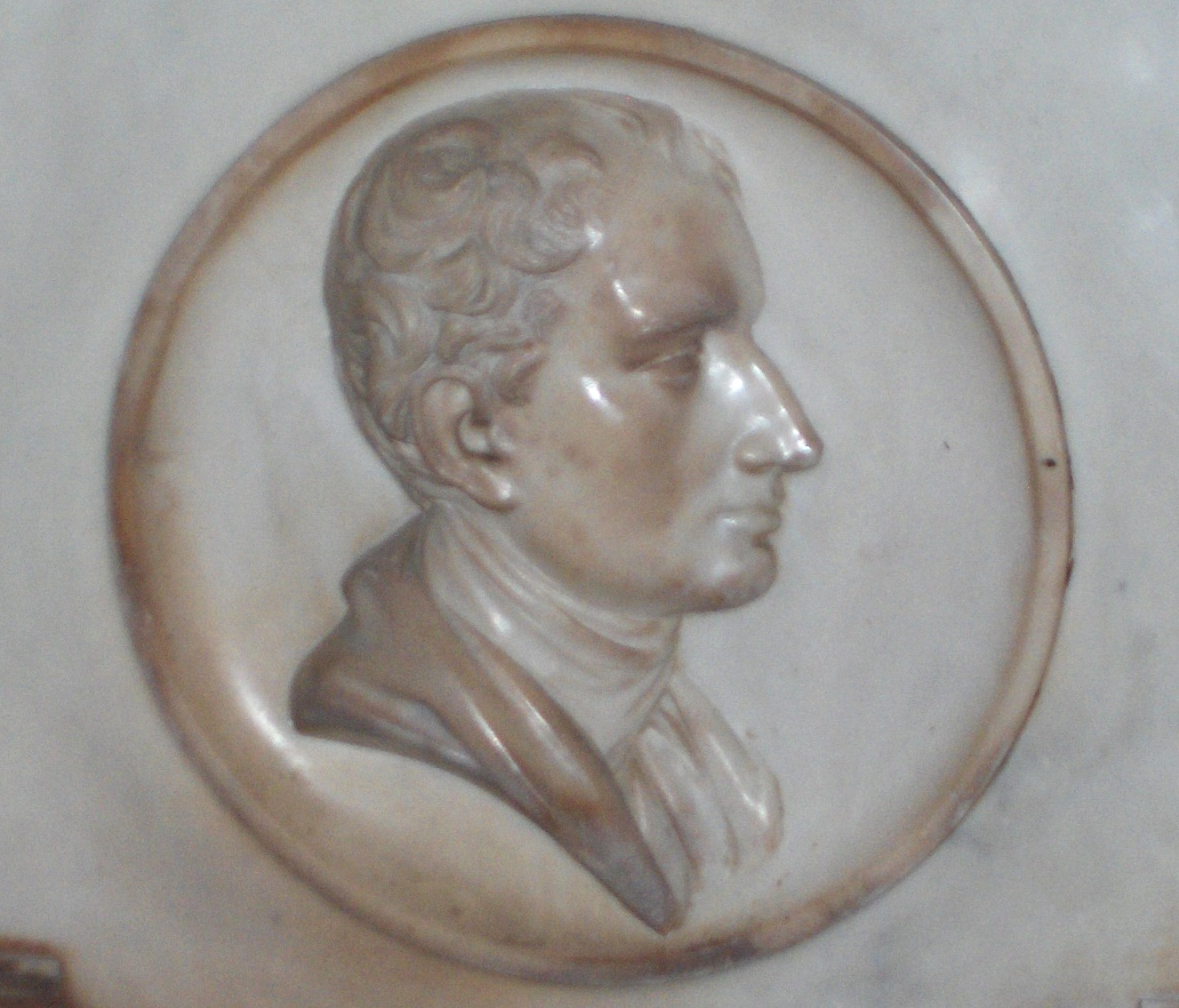
Bas-relief of John Thomas James in Christ Church Cathedral, Oxford

John Thomas James (1786 – 1828) was a Church of England bishop. He was bishop of Calcutta from 1827 to 1828. He also wrote travel and art books.

== Life ==
Born 23 January 1786 at Rugby, he was the eldest son of Thomas James, head-master of Rugby School, by his second wife. He was educated at Rugby until he was twelve years old, when, through the influence of the Earl of Dartmouth, he was placed on the foundation of Charterhouse School. In 1803 he gained the first prize medal given by the Society for the Encouragement of Arts and Sciences. He left Charterhouse in May 1804, and entered Christ Church, Oxford, as a commoner. After the death of his father, 23 September 1804, he was nominated dean's student by Cyril Jackson. He graduated B.A. 9 March 1808, and M.A. 24 October 1810, and continued to reside at Oxford, first as a private tutor and afterwards as student and tutor of Christ Church, till 1813, when he went abroad.

During this time James visited the courts of Berlin, Stockholm, and St. Petersburg. He visited Moscow, which had just then been burned, and went through Poland to Vienna. In 1816 James visited Italy, and studied painting at Rome and Naples. On his return to England he took holy orders, and resigned his studentship on being presented by the dean and chapter of Christ Church to the vicarage of Flitton-cum-Silsoe in Bedfordshire.

James's appointment to the bishopric of Calcutta, in succession to Reginald Heber, came at the end of 1826, and he resigned his vicarage in April 1827. The University of Oxford gave him the degree of D.D. by diploma on 10 May, and on Whitsunday, 3 June, he was consecrated at Lambeth. He landed at Calcutta 18 January 1828, and was installed in Calcutta Cathedral on the following Sunday, the 20th.

For purposes of organisation James divided the city of Calcutta into three parochial districts, the fort itself constituting a fourth. On 20 June 1828 he set out on a visitation to the western provinces of his diocese, but, taken ill, he returned to Calcutta and was advised to take a sea voyage. He sailed for China on 9 August, but died during the voyage on 22 August. His library was sold at auction in London by R. H. Evans on 27 May (and two following days); a copy of the catalogue is held at Cambridge University Library (shelfmark Munby.c.138(6)).

== Works ==
James published, in 1816, a Journal of a Tour in Germany, Sweden, Russia, and Poland, during 1813 and 1814, Subsequent editions appeared in 1817 and 1819. He published two works on art—The Italian Schools of Painting, in 1820, and The Flemish, Dutch, and German Schools of Painting, in 1822—and a theological work entitled The Semi-Sceptic, or the Common Sense of Religion considered, in 1825. His intention was to add treatises on the English, French, and Spanish schools. In 1826 he began the publication of a series of Views in Russia, Sweden, Poland, and Germany. These were engraved on stone by himself, and coloured so as to represent originals. Five numbers appeared during 1826 and 1827, when the publication was interrupted. A Charge by him was published in 1829.

== Family ==
In 1823 James married Marianne Jane, fourth daughter of Frederick Reeves, of East Sheen, Surrey, and formerly of Mangalore, in the Bombay presidency.
