= George Cotton (priest) =

English Anglican priest

- Born: 21 May 1743; Combermere
- Died: 10 December 1805 (aged 62); Bath
- Occupation: Anglican priest

George Cotton (21 May 1743 – 10 December 1805) was an English Anglican priest, most notably Dean of Chester from 1787 until his death.

Cholmondeley was born at Combermere in Cheshire and was educated at Westminster and Trinity College, Cambridge. He held livings at South Reston, Stowe, Stoke-upon-Trent and Davenham. He died at Bath. His grandson was Bishop of Calcutta from 1858 until 1866.

== Notes ==
Church of England titles
| Preceded by William Smith | Dean of Chester; 1787 – 1805 | Succeeded by Hugh Cholmondeley |
