= Daniel Wilson (bishop) =

British bishop

The Most Reverend Daniel Wilson
- Bishop of Calcutta
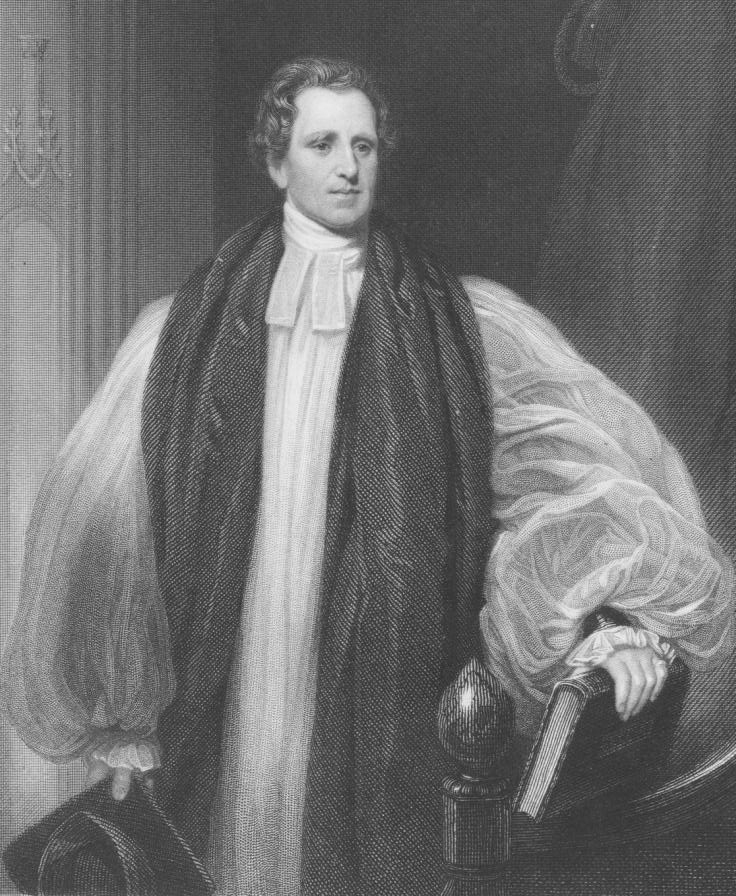
- Wilson in 1832, portrait by Thomas Phillips.
- Church: Church of England
- Diocese: Calcutta
- Installed: 1832
- Term ended: 1858
- Predecessor: John Turner
- Successor: George Cotton

Personal details
- Born: 2 July 1778 Spitalfields, London, England, Kingdom of Great Britain
- Died: 2 January 1858 (aged 79) Calcutta, Bengal Presidency, British India
- Buried: St. Paul's Cathedral, Kolkata, India

Daniel Wilson (2 July 1778 – 2 January 1858) was an English Bishop of Calcutta.

== Early life ==
Born in Spitalfields, London, he was the son of the silk manufacturer Stephen Wilson and his wife Ann Collett West. He was apprenticed to his uncle William Wilson in 1791.

Wilson was persuaded by John Eyre and John Newton to become a minister. They were associates of his maternal grandfather Daniel West, as were Thomas Wilson his first cousin and his father Thomas, Samuel Brewer, Thomas Haweis, and George Whitefield. He matriculated at St Edmund Hall, Oxford in 1798, and graduated B.A. in 1802, M.A. in 1804. He was ordained in 1801 and became curate to Richard Cecil at Chobham and Bisley.

== Evangelical priest ==
Wilson developed into a strong preacher, associated with the Clapham Sect of evangelical Anglicans. He was tutor or vice-principal of St Edmund Hall, and minister of Worton, Oxfordshire, 1807 to 1812; assistant curate at St John's Chapel, Bedford Row, Bloomsbury, 1808 to 1812 (where Richard Cecil had earlier been incumbent); sole minister there, 1812 to 1824; and vicar of St Mary's Church, Islington, 1824 to 1832.

Wilson founded the Islington Clerical Conference in 1827 in his library. In 1831, Wilson was one of the founders of the Lord's Day Observance Society.

== In India ==
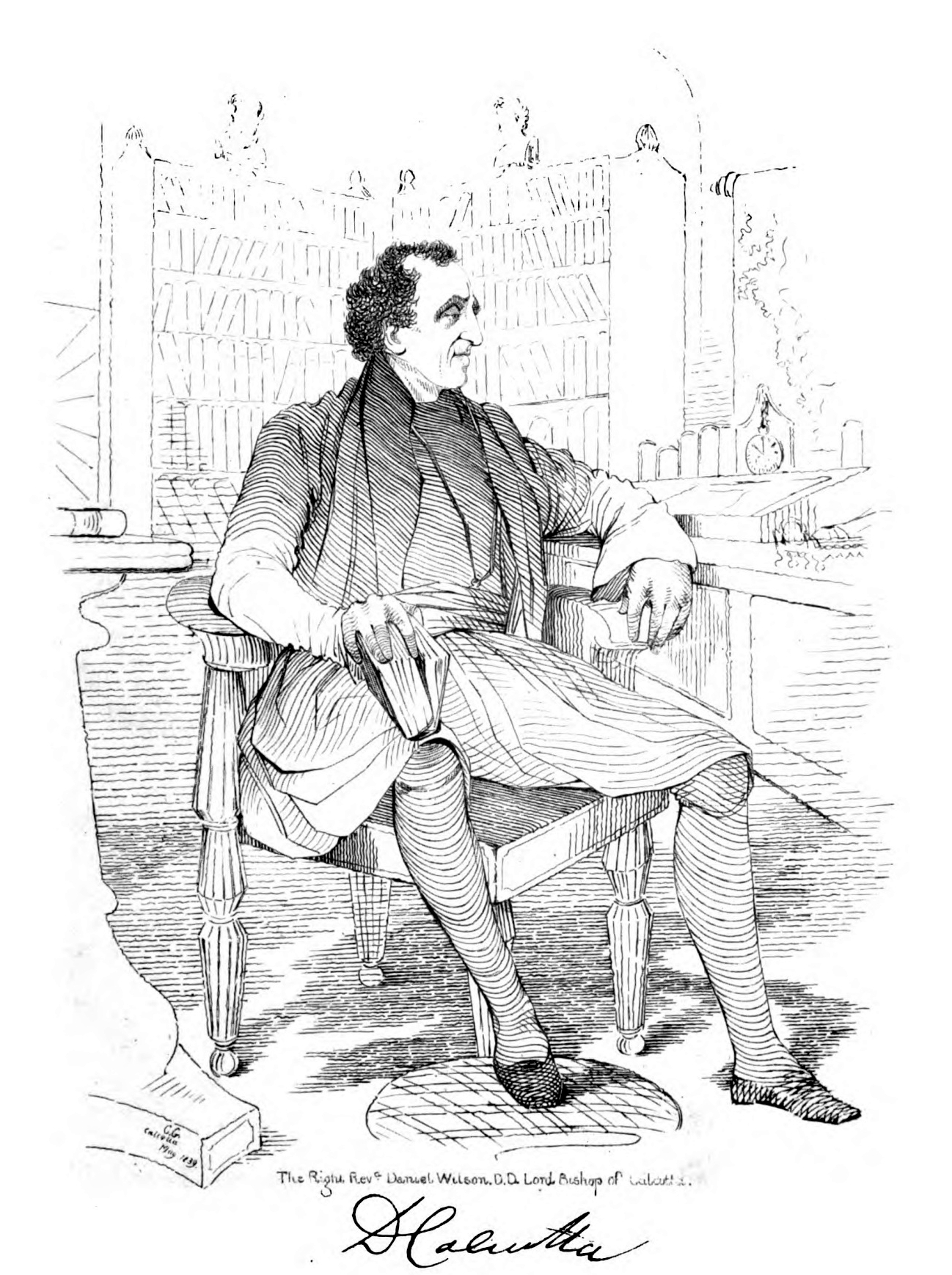
Portrait sketch by Colesworthey Grant

In 1832 Wilson was awarded a D.D. by diploma by the University of Oxford. That year he was consecrated Bishop of Calcutta and first Metropolitan of India and Ceylon. He founded an English church at Rangoon, Ceylon, in 1855 and St Paul's Cathedral, Calcutta (consecrated 1847). He was an indefatigable worker and as bishop was noted for fidelity and firmness. He also founded Dhaka College on 18 July 1841. It was completed in 1846 with the aid of the Bishop of Calcutta. In 1835, Wilson was noted for calling India's caste system "a cancer".

Wilson died in Calcutta in 1858 and is buried in St. Paul's Cathedral, Kolkata.

== Works ==
- Numerous sermons published separately and in collections
- The Evidences of Christianity, . . . a Course of Lectures (2 vols., London, 1828–1830)
- Bishop Wilson's Journal Letters, addressed to his Family the first Nine Years of his Indian Episcopacy (1863; edited by his son Daniel Wilson, Vicar of Islington)
- The Divine Authority and Perpetual Obligation of the Lord's Day, asserted in seven sermons (London, 1831) (in print, from Day One)

== Family ==
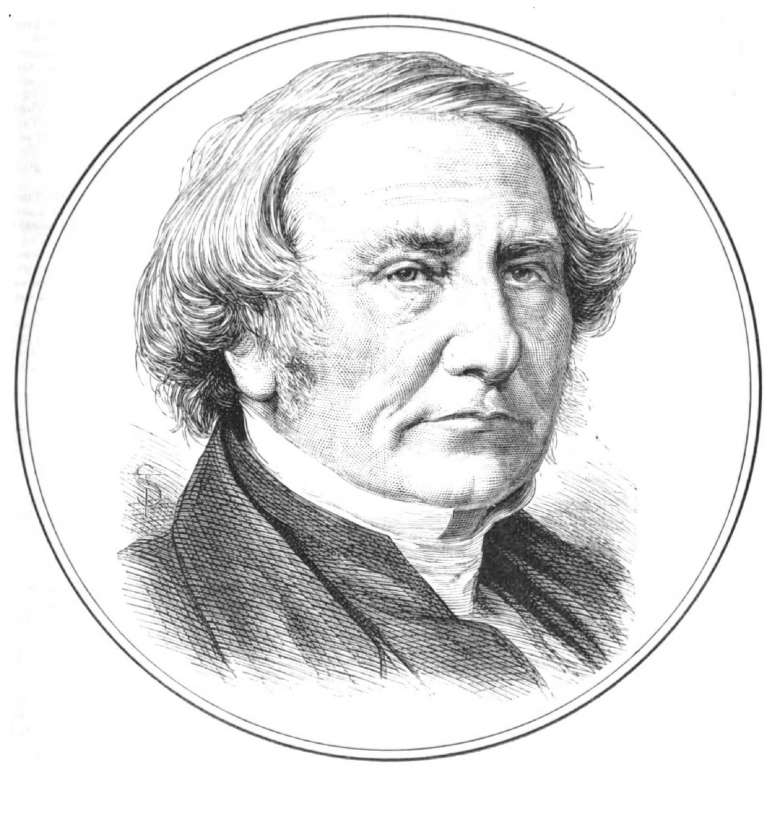
Daniel Wilson, the younger

In 1803 Wilson married Ann Wilson (died 1827), daughter of William Wilson, a cousin. Of their six children, three died young.

When Wilson left for India, his son Daniel Frederick Wilson, then aged 27, took over as Vicar of Islington and served there for over 40 years. Another son became a missionary to indigenous Canadians in the Diocese of Algoma in the Ecclesiastical Province of Ontario. His daughter was fostered by Anne Woodrooffe.
