= George Hubback =

Anglican priest in the mid twentieth century

George Clay Hubback was an Anglican priest in the mid-twentieth century.

== Early life ==
Born on 7 April 1882 he was educated at Rossall School and Liverpool University and began his career as a Civil Engineer before being ordained for the priesthood in 1910.

== Evangelical career ==
After a curacy at St Anne's, South Lambeth he was with the Oxford Mission to India until 1924 when he became Bishop of Assam. In 1945 he was translated to Bishop of Calcutta and with it the title of Metropolitan of India. He retired in 1950 and died on 2 November 1955.

== Notes ==
Church of England titles
Preceded by Herbert Pakenham-Walsh	Bishop of Assam; 1924–1945	Succeeded by Nirod Biswas
Preceded by Foss Westcott	Bishop of Calcutta; 1945–1950	Succeeded by Aurobindo Nath Mukherjee
