= Shreyasi Chatterjee =

Indian painter

- Born: 1960 (age 65–66); Kolkata, West Bengal, India
- Education: Goldsmiths College, London
- Occupation: Painter
- Known for: Mixture of Kantha embroidery and painting

Shreyasi Chatterjee (born 1960, in Kolkata, West Bengal) is an Indian painter. Her work utilizes a mixture of indigenous Kantha embroidery and painting, and is influenced by Indian miniature painting and Modern Art. She attended Goldsmith College in London.
