= George Cotton =

English educator and clergyman

The Most Reverend George Edward Lynch Cotton
- Bishop of Calcutta
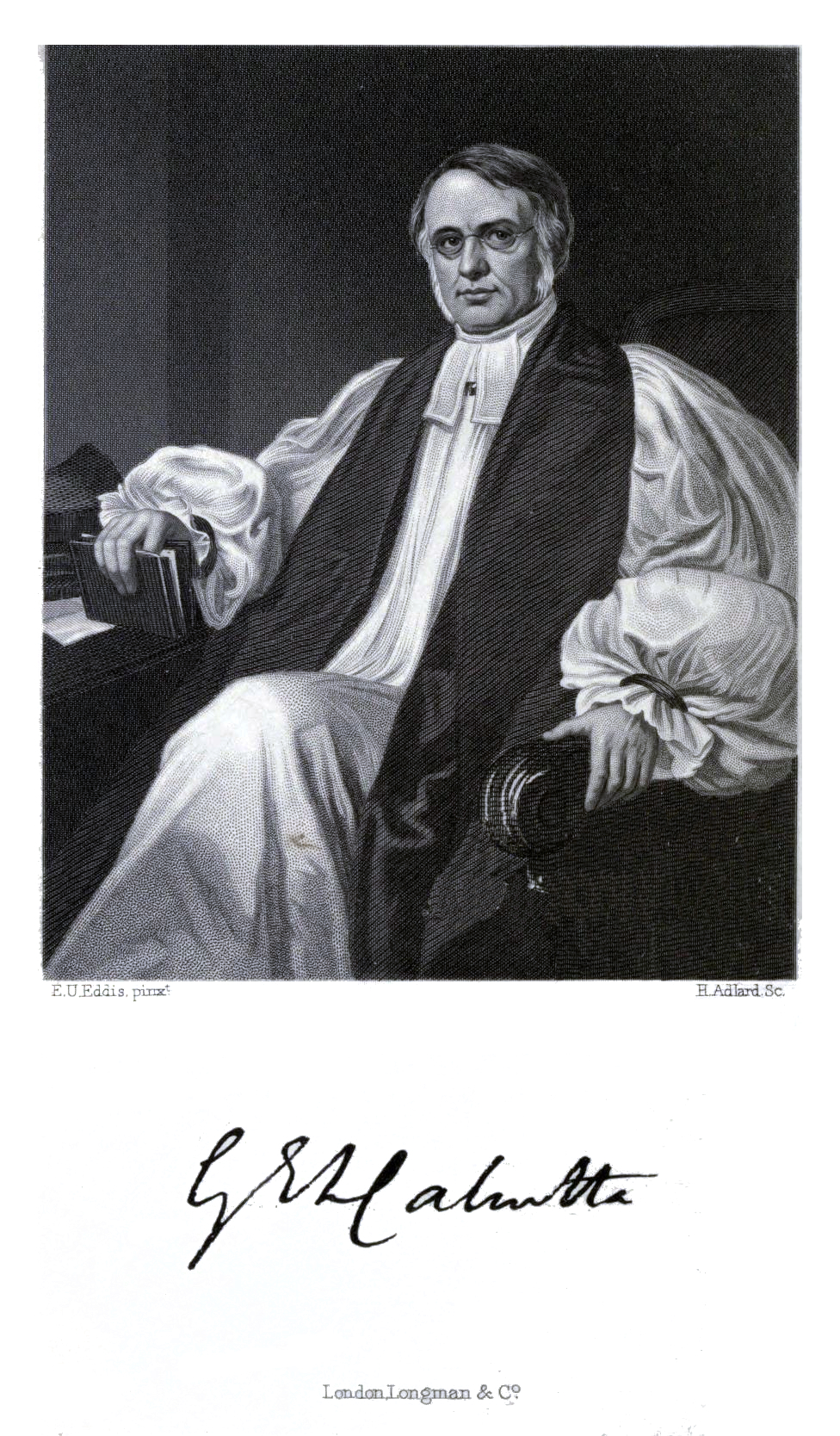
- Bishop Cotton
- Church: Church of England
- Diocese: Calcutta
- In office: 1858–1866

Personal details
- Born: 29 October 1813 Chester, England
- Died: 6 October 1866 (aged 52) Kushtia, Bengal Presidency, British India

George Edward Lynch Cotton (29 October 1813 – 6 October 1866) was the Bishop of Calcutta. He was also an English educator and clergyman, known for his connections with British India and the public school system.

== Life in England ==
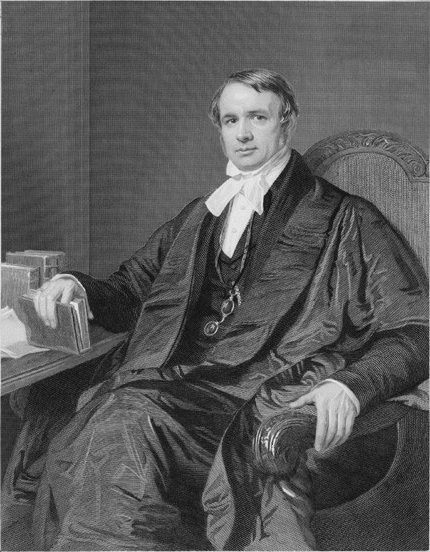
Portrait of George Cotton (c. 1854), at the National Portrait Gallery, London

He was born at Chester, a grandson of George Cotton, Dean of Chester.

His father, Thomas George D'Avenant Cotton—born in Acton, Cheshire, England on 28 June 1783 to George and Catherine Maria (née Tomkinson) Cotton—was a captain in the Royal Fusiliers and died in the Peninsular War in 1813 at the Battle of Nivelle, two weeks after George's birth. He received his education at The King's School, Chester, Westminster School, and at Trinity College, Cambridge. Here he joined the Low Church party, and was a close friend of several disciples of Thomas Arnold, including CJ Vaughan and WJ Conybeare. Arnold's influence determined the character and course of Cotton's life.

He graduated BA in 1836, and became an assistant master at Rugby School. He became master of the fifth form in about 1840. In 1852 he accepted the appointment of headmaster at Marlborough College, reviving its financial, educational and reputational status. Both Rugby School and Marlborough College boarding houses were subsequently named after him.

Cotton married his cousin, Sophia Ann Tomkinson, daughter of Rev. Henry Tomkinson and niece of T. J. Phillips Jodrell, on 26 June 1845. They had two children; a son, Edward Cotton-Jodrell (later MP for Wirral) and a daughter, Ursula Mary, who also married within the clergy.

== India ==
In 1858, Cotton was offered the office of the Bishop of Calcutta, which, after much hesitation, he accepted. The government of India had just been transferred from the British East India Company to the crown, and questions of education were eagerly discussed, following Macaulay's famous Minute on Indian Education.

Cotton established schools for British and Eurasian (and Indian) children including the Bishop Cotton School Shimla. The Bishop Cotton Boys' School and Bishop Cotton Girls' School in Bangalore were established in his memory. The Bishop Cotton School in Nagpur also bears his name. He founded many other schools in India, including St. James' School in Calcutta, and Cathedral and John Connon in Bombay.

As the senior Anglican prelate in India, he also consecrated a number of new churches throughout the subcontinent, including St. Luke's Church, Abbottabad, and others on what then used to be the Punjab Province and later became the North West Frontier Province.

A memoir of his life with selections from his journals and correspondence, edited by his widow, was published in 1871.

== Death ==
On 6 October 1866, he had consecrated a cemetery at Kushtia on the Ganges in the then Bengal Presidency, and was crossing a plank leading from the bank to the steamer when he slipped and fell into the river Gorai. He was carried away by the current and never seen again.

== Bibliography ==
- Cotton, George Edward Lynch (1871). Cotton, Sophia Ann (ed.). Memoir of George Edward Lynch Cotton, D.D.:Bishop of Calcutta and metropolitan with selections from his journals and correspondence. London: Longmans, Green and Co.

Church of England titles
Preceded by Daniel Wilson	Bishop of Calcutta; 1858–1866	Succeeded by Robert Milman
