= Diocese of North East India =

Diocese of the Church of North India

The Diocese of North East India is a diocese of the Church of North India, centred in Shillong, North-East India.

The Diocese of Assam, of the (Anglican) Church of India, Burma and Ceylon, was created from the Diocese of Calcutta in 1915. In 1970, it became a diocese of the united Church of North India; and had its current name by 1986.

== Bishops of Assam ==
The Church of India, Burma and Ceylon diocese had three bishops prior to Indian independence:

- 1915–1924: Herbert Pakenham-Walsh (1871–1959)
- 1924–1945: George Hubback (1882–1955)
- 1946–1948: Nirod Biswas

and three after:

- 1949–1962: Joseph Amritanand
- 1963–1967: Eric Samuel Nasir
- 1968–1970: Ariel Victor Jonathan

== Bishops of North East India ==
- 1970–1986: D. D. Pradhan, Bishop of Assam
- 1986–1998: Ernest William Talibuddin
- 1999 – aft. 2015: Purely Lyngdoh
- c. 2017 – present: Michael Herenz
