= Ralph Johnson (bishop) =

Anglican priest in British India

Bishop Ralph Johnson
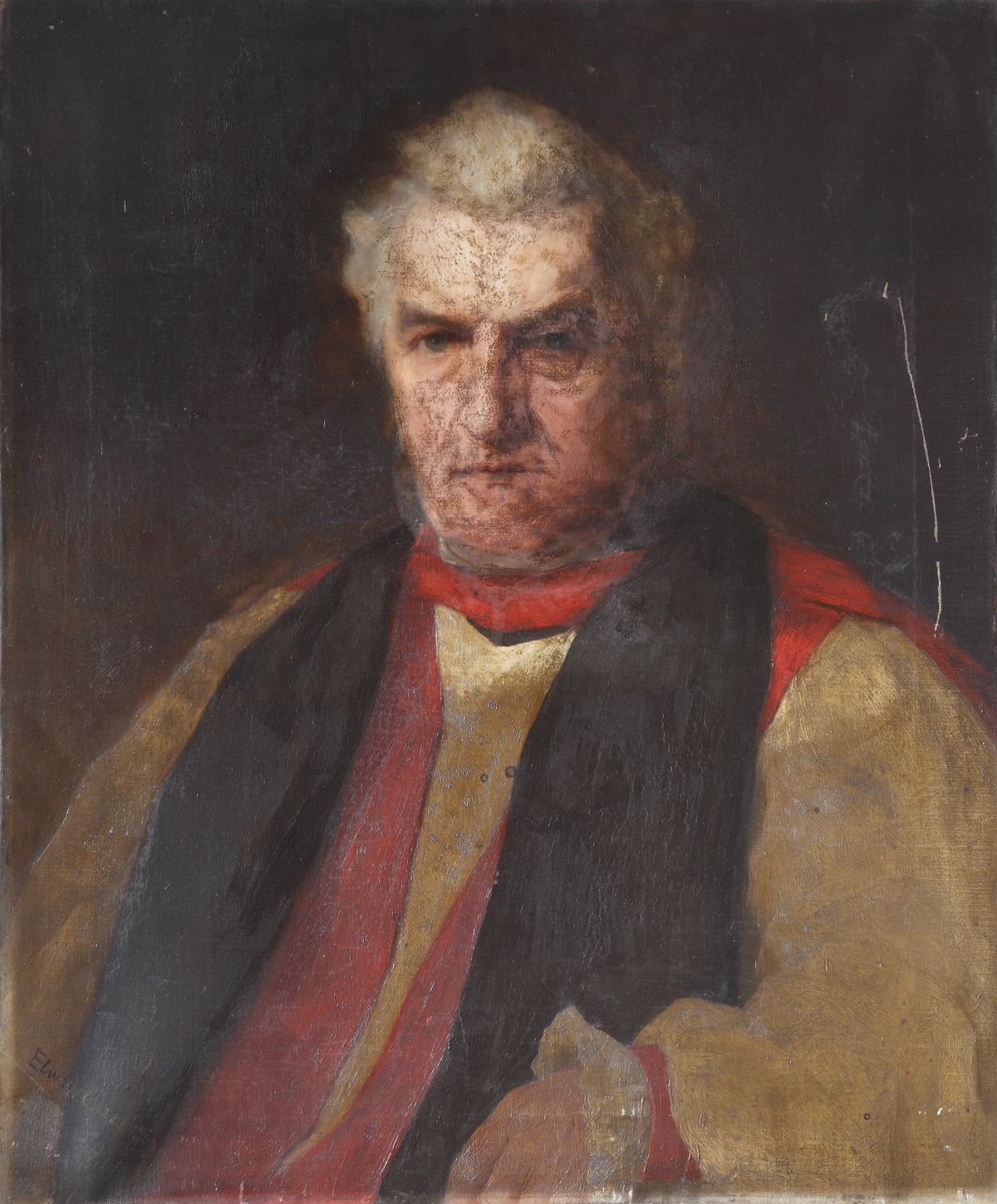
- Edward Ralph Johnson (by Frederick Elwyn Calderon, 1897)
- Born: 1828
- Died: 11 September 1912 (aged 83–84)
- Education: Wadham College, Oxford
- Church: Anglican
- Ordained: 1850
- Congregations served: Northenden St Wilfrid
- Offices held: Archdeacon of Chester; Bishop of Calcutta; Metropolitan bishop of India

Edward Ralph Johnson (1828 – 11 September 1912) was an Anglican priest in the second half of the 19th century.
He was born in 1828, educated at Wadham College, Oxford and ordained in 1850. His first post was a curacy in Farnborough, Warwickshire after which he was a Minor Canon at Chester Cathedral. He was Rector of Northenden and then collated Archdeacon of Chester in 1871 before being elevated to the episcopate as Bishop of Calcutta in 1876 and Metropolitan of India. He retired in 1898 and died on 11 September 1912.

Church of England titles
Preceded by Robert Milman	Bishop of Calcutta; 1876–1898	Succeeded by James Edward Cowell Welldon
