= Diocese of Calcutta (Church of North India) =

Diocese of the Church of India CIPBC

Diocese of Calcutta(C.N.I) Logo

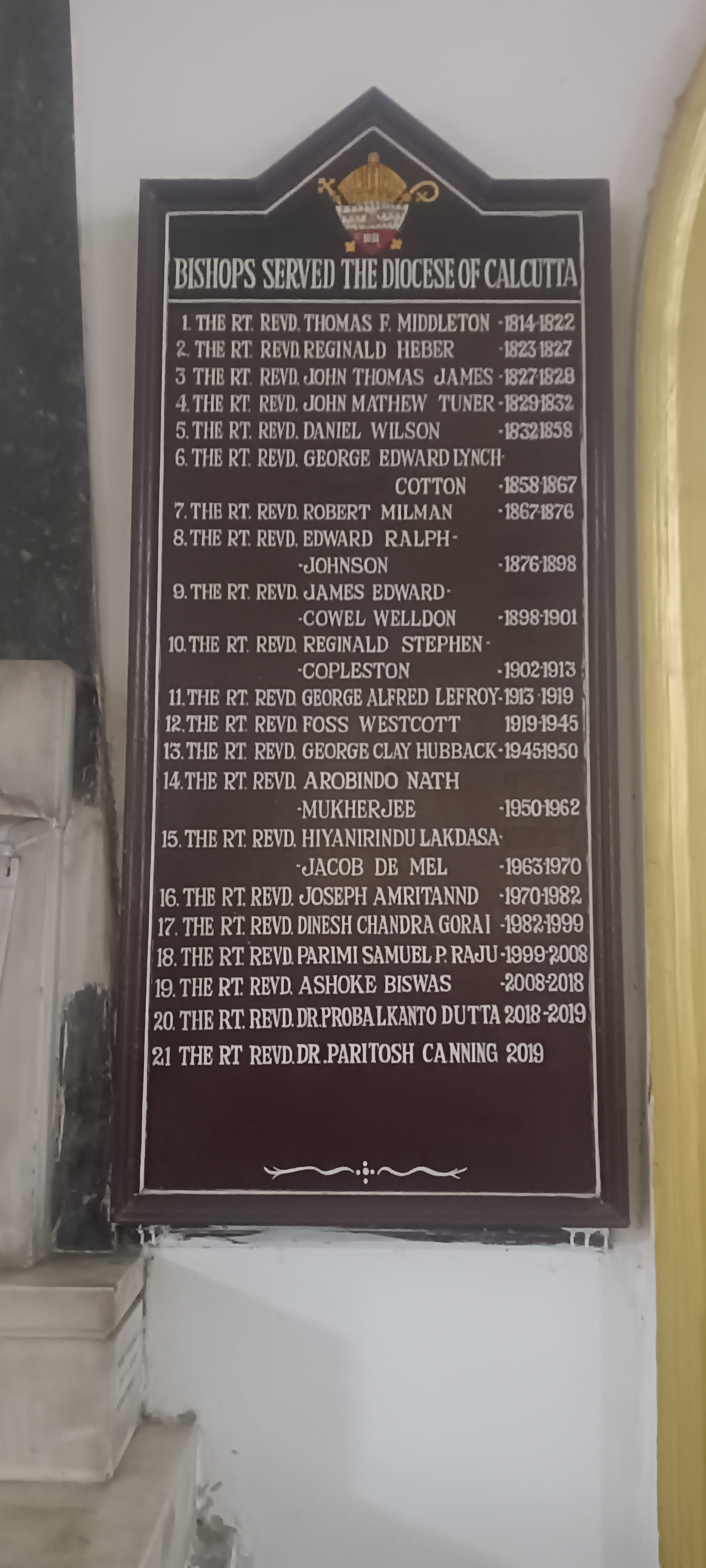
List of Bishops of Calcutta

Diocese of Calcutta is a diocese under the Church of North India. It was established in 1813 as part of the Church of England. It is led by the Bishop of Calcutta and the first bishop was Thomas Middleton (1814–1822) and the second Reginald Heber (1823–1826). Under the sixth bishop Daniel Wilson (1832–1858), the see was made Metropolitan (though not made an Archbishopric) when two more dioceses in India came into being (Madras, 1835, and Bombay, 1837).

Calcutta was made a metropolitan see by letters patent on 10 October 1835 and in 1930 was included in the Church of India, Burma and Ceylon (from 1948 the Church of India, Pakistan, Burma, and Ceylon) until 1970. In 1970, the Church of the Province of Myanmar, Church of Ceylon and the Church of Pakistan were separated from the province.

The Anglican dioceses in India merged with the United Church of Northern India (Congregationalist and Presbyterian), the Methodist Church (British and Australian Conferences), the Council of Baptist Churches in Northern India, the Church of the Brethren in India, and the Disciples of Christ to form the Church of India in the same year.

In 1842 (after Madras and Bombay dioceses had been erected), her jurisdiction was described as "Presidency of Bengal". The diocese currently has jurisdiction over the corporation limits of Kolkata and the Districts of Hooghly & Howrah in the state of West Bengal. The bishop's seat (cathedra) is located in the city of Kolkata at St. Paul's Cathedral. The current bishop is Paritosh Canning.

== List of Bishops of Calcutta ==
Bishops of Calcutta
| From | Until | Incumbent | Notes |
|---|---|---|---|
| 1814 | 1823 | Thomas Middleton | Died in office. |
| 1823 | 1826 | Reginald Heber | Died in office. |
| 1827 | 1828 | Thomas James | Died in office and buried at sea. |
| 1829 | 1831 | John Turner | Died in office. |
| 1832 | 1858 | Daniel Wilson | First Metropolitan of India ex officio from 1835; died in office. |
| 1858 | 1866 | George Cotton | Also Metropolitan of India ex officio; died in office. |
| 1866 | 1876 | Robert Milman | Also Metropolitan of India ex officio; died in office. |
| 1876 | 1898 | Ralph Johnson | Also Metropolitan of India ex officio; retired. |
| 1898 | 1902 | James Welldon | Also Metropolitan of India ex officio; resigned due to ill health and returned to the United Kingdom. |
| 1902 | 1913 | Reginald Copleston | Translated from Colombo; also Metropolitan of India ex officio. |
| 1913 | 1919 | George Lefroy | Translated from Lahore; also Metropolitan of India ex officio; died in office. |
| 1919 | 1945 | Foss Westcott | Translated from Chota Nagpur; also Metropolitan of India ex officio. |
| 1945 | 1950 | George Hubback | Translated from Assam; also Metropolitan of India ex officio. |
| 1950 | 1962 | Aurobindo Nath Mukherjee | Translated from Delhi; first native bishop; also Metropolitan of India ex officio. |
| 1962 | 1970 | Lakdasa De Mel | Translated from Kurunegala; also Metropolitan of India ex officio. |
| 1970 | 1980 | Joseph Amritanand | Translated from Assam. |
| 1980 | 1999 | Dinesh Chandra Gorai | Translated from Barrackpore. |
| 1999 | 2008 | Samuel Raju | |
| 2008 | 2018 | Ashoke Biswas | |
| September 2018 | June 2019 | Probal Kanta Dutta | Transferred from Durgapur. |
| June 2019 | Incumbent | Paritosh Canning | Transferred from Barrackpore |

== Assistant bishops ==
John Richardson was appointed assistant bishop for, and Commissary for the Metropolitan, in the Andaman and Nicobar Islands in 1950, and remained an assistant bishop of Calcutta until the Diocese of Andaman and Nicobar was erected from Calcutta diocese in 1966. At that point, he became an assistant bishop of the new diocese, where he served until 1977.

William Arthur Partridge (12 February 1912 – 18 December 1992; called Arthur) was assistant Bishop in Nandyal from 1953 until the erection of the Diocese of Nandyal in 1963. He returned to the United Kingdom and served as an Assistant Bishop of Hereford.

M. D. (Manonmani David) Srinivasan was appointed an assistant bishop of the Anglican diocese in 1964 and consecrated a bishop in January 1985.

John Banerjee was appointed assistant bishop of Lahore in 1931. He travelled to Australia in 1936 and was presented as Metropolitan of India.

== See also ==
- Christianity in West Bengal
- Christianity in India
- Church of India
- Roman Catholic Archdiocese of Calcutta
