= Nayak (surname) =

Nayak is an Indian surname.

== List of people with the name ==
=== A ===
- Aarti Nayak, Indian classical music vocalist
- Abhinav Sunder Nayak, Indian film director
- Achutha Ramachandra Nayak (r. 1520–1540), ruler of the Nayaks of Gingee
- Achuthappa Nayak (r. 1580–1614), ruler of the Nayaks of Tanjore
- Akash Das Nayak (born 1981), Indian actor
- Alagiri Nayak, king of the Madurai Nayak Dynasty
- Amar Kumar Nayak (born 1973), Indian politician
- Ambika Nayak, known professionally as Kayan, Indian musician
- Amrit Keshav Nayak (1877–1907), Indian theatre actor and director
- Ananta Nayak (born 1969), Indian politician
- Anoop Nayak, British academic
- Archana Nayak (born 1966), Indian politician
- Atanu Sabyasachi Nayak, Indian politician

=== B ===
- B. V. Nayak (born 1966), Indian politician
- Baksi Nayak (1922–1993), Indian politician
- Bapulal Nayak (1879–1947), Indian stage actor and director
- Barsha Patnaik (née Nayak), Indian actress
- Bibhuti Bhushan Nayak (born 1965), Indian journalist and martial artist
- Bijay Kumar Nayak, Indian Protestant bishop
- Bijaya Kumar Nayak (1951–2020), Indian lawyer and politician
- Bangaru Thirumalai Nayak, member of the Madurai Nayak royal family
- Bhima Nayak (died 1876), Indian revolutionary

=== C ===
- Chetan Nayak (born 1971), American physicist and computer scientist
- Chokkanatha Nayak (1662–1682), king of the Madurai Nayak Dynasty

=== D ===
- Daya Nayak, Indian police inspector
- Dinesh Nayak (born 1972), Indian field hockey player
- Durga Prasan Nayak, Indian politician

=== E ===
- Era Krishnappa Nayak (r. 1524–1566), king of Belur

=== G ===
- G. Hampayya Nayak (born 1939), Indian politician
- Ghanashyam Nayak (1944–2021), Indian film and television actor
- Gopal Krishna Nayak (born 1960), Indian professor of information systems
- Gopalkrishna P. Nayak (1927–2017), Indian Kannada drama writer
- Govindray H. Nayak (1933–2023), Indian writer and academic

=== H ===
- H. M. Nayak (1931–2000), Indian academic, writer and folklorist

=== J ===
- Jatindra Kumar Nayak (born 1956), Indian translator, literary critic and columnist
- Jawahar Nayak (born 1954), Indian politician
- Jhabbu Nayak, founder of the Jhabua dynasty
- Jyoti Ranjan Nayak (born 1994), Indian actor

=== K ===
- K. Praveen Nayak (born 1962), Indian film director
- Karemma Nayak, Indian politician
- Khem Nayak, also known as Varunakulattan, 17th-century feudal lord of the Jaffna Kingdom
- Krushna Chandra Nayak, Indian politician
- Krutibas Nayak (born 1955), Indian author
- Kumara Krishnappa Nayak, ruler of the Madurai Nayak Dynasty

=== L ===
- Laichan Nayak, Indian politician
- Laxman Nayak (1899–1943), tribal civil rights activist of South Odisha in eastern India
- Laxminarayan Nayak (1918–2019), Indian politician
- Lok Nayak (1902–1979), also known as Jayaprakash Narayan, Indian politician, theorist and independence activist

=== M ===
- Mahavir Nayak (born 1942), Indian Nagpuri singer and songwriter
- Mayankbhai Nayak, Indian politician
- Mohan Nayak (1921–1983), Indian politician
- Mrutyunjaya Nayak (born 1952), Indian educationalist and social worker from Odisha
- Mukesh Nayak (born 1957), Indian politician
- Mukund Nayak (born 1949), Indian artist and folk singer
- Muljibhai Nayak (1892–1971), Indian theatre director

=== N ===
- Nakul Nayak (born 1963), Indian politician
- Nalini Nayak, Indian activist
- Nandlal Nayak (born 1973), Indian folk artist and film director
- Narasimha Nayak (born 1978), Indian politician
- Narendra Nayak (born 1951), Indian rationalist
- Nauri Nayak, Indian politician
- Nina Nayak (born 1953), Indian social worker

=== P ===
- Padma Charana Nayak (born 1926), Indian Gandhism activist
- Pedda Koneti Nayak (r. 1635–1652), founder of the Penukonda Nayak kingdom
- Pradyumna Kumar Nayak, Indian politician
- Pranati Nayak (born 1995), Indian artistic gymnast
- Pransukh Nayak (1910–1989), Indian Gujarati theatre actor and director
- Pratap Chandra Nayak, Indian politician
- Preet Kaur Nayak (born 1983), Indian television actress
- Premananda Nayak, Indian politician
- Puttur Narasimha Nayak (born 1958), Indian singer

=== R ===
- Radhakant Nayak (born 1939), Indian politician
- Radhika and Dudhika Nayak (1888–1902/1903), Indian conjoined twin sisters
- Raghubhai Morarji Nayak (1907–2003), Indian educationist and social worker
- Raghunatha Nayak (r. 1600–1634), king of the Nayaks of Tanjore
- Rajarshi Raghabananda Nayak (1938–2016), Indian writer
- Ramdas Nayak (died 1994), Indian politician
- Ramesh Karthik Nayak (born 1997), Indian Telugu writer
- Ranjit Nayak (born 1968), Indian businessperson

=== S ===
- S. R. Nayak (1944–2025), Indian judge
- Sachin Nayak (born 1977), Indian actor
- Sandeep Nayak (born 1976), Indian physician
- Sanjay Nayak (born 1975), Indian filmmaker
- Sarada Prasad Nayak (born 1959), Indian politician
- Sarat Nayak, Indian music composer and singer
- Sarat Chandra Nayak (born 1957), Indian Catholic bishop
- Satyarth Nayak (born 1981), Indian author and screenwriter
- Sevappa Nayak (r. 1532–1560), first ruler of the Nayaks of Tanjore
- Shailesh Nayak (born 1953), Indian scientist
- Simarani Nayak (born 1964), Indian politician
- Sohan Lal Nayak, Indian politician
- Subham Nayak (born 1998), Indian cricketer
- Sudhir Nayak (born 1972), Indian classical harmonium player
- Sujit Nayak (born 1989), Indian cricketer
- Sumitra Nayak (born 2000), Indian rugby player
- Suru Nayak (born 1954), Indian cricketer
- Swarup Nayak (1947–2023), Indian musician and actor

=== T ===
- Tapasya Nayak Srivastava (born 1986), Indian television actress
- Thirumalai Nayak (r. 1623–1659), king of the Madurai Nayak Dynasty
- Tubaki Krishnappa Nayak (r. 1509–1521), was an army commander in service of the Vijayanagar emperor

=== V ===
- Vasanti N. Bhat-Nayak (1938–2009), Indian mathematician
- Vijaya Raghava Nayak (1590s-1673), king of the Nayaks of Tanjore
- Vishal Nayak, Indian television actor
- Viswanatha Nayak (r. 1529–1564), founder of the Madurai Nayak Dynasty

== See also ==
- Nayak (disambiguation)
- Naik (disambiguation)
