= Nitasha Kaul =

British academic

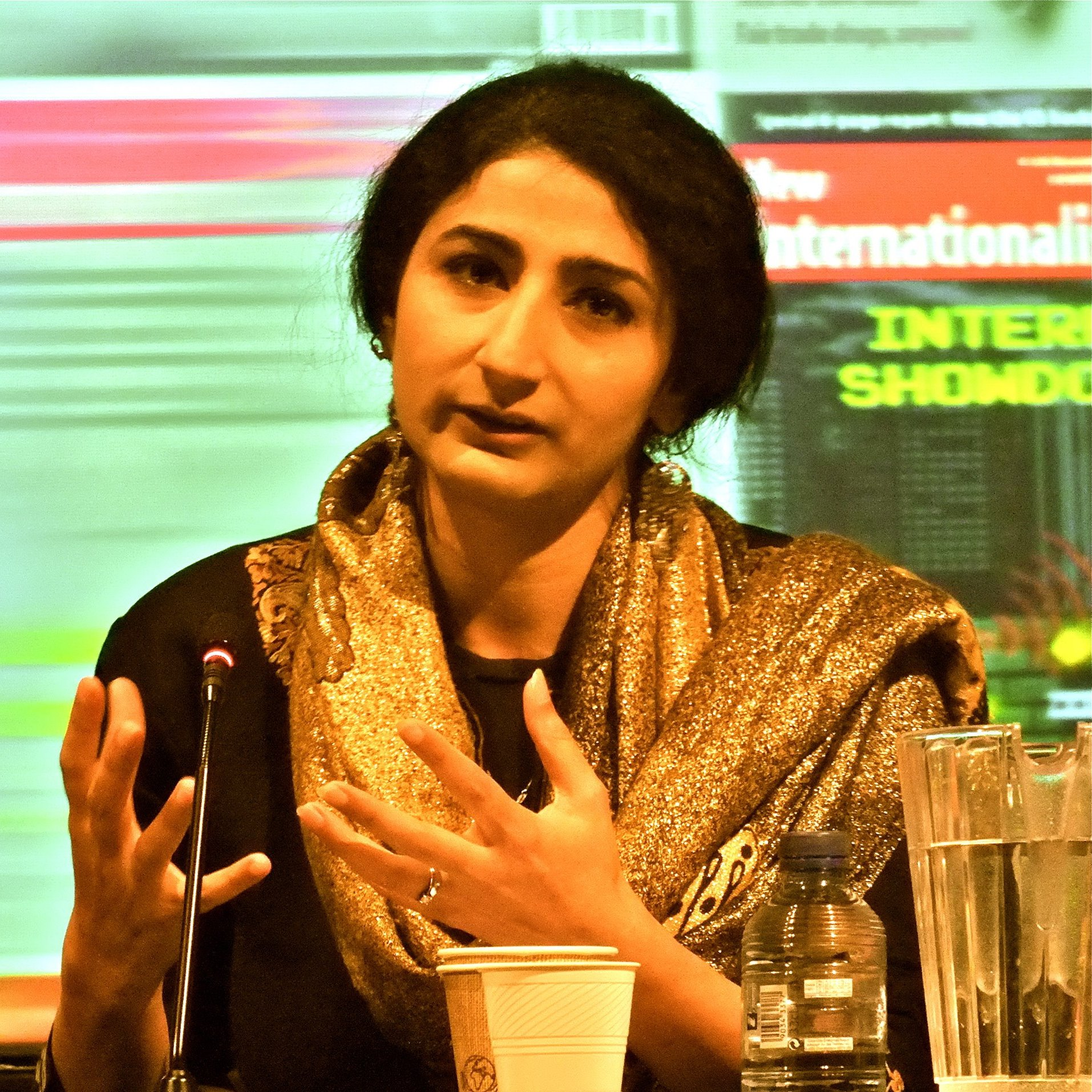
- Kaul in 2013
- Born: Nitasha Kaul; November 1976; Gorakhpur, India
- Citizenship: British
- Education: St. Thomas' School
- Alma mater: University of Delhi (BA); University of Hull (MA, PhD)
- Occupations: Writer, Poet, Activist, Academic
- Known for: Residue

Nitasha Kaul is a British academic, writer and poet based in London. In addition to fiction, she writes and speaks about topics that cover the political economy, Bhutan, Kashmir, nationalism in India, gender and identity.

== Early life and education ==
Nitasha Kaul was born in November 1976 in Gorakhpur, in the Indian state of Uttar Pradesh, into a Kashmiri Pandit family that had migrated from the Downtown Mohalla of Srinagar.

Kaul was raised in New Delhi and studied at St. Thomas' School. Kaul graduated with a Bachelor's degree in Economics from the Sri Ram College of Commerce, affiliated with the University of Delhi.

Kaul moved to England from India in 1997, at the age of 21, for pursuing her post-graduate degree from University of Hull. Kaul went on to earn her Doctorate in Economics and Philosophy from Hull in 2003. Her doctoral thesis was Interrogating the Subject-World of Economic Epistemology: Re-Imagining Theory and Difference.

== Career ==
Kaul is a professor of Politics, International Relations, and Critical Interdisciplinary Studies at the University of Westminster in the UK. In addition to her chair, she is also the Director of the Centre for the Study of Democracy (CSD). Kaul served as a lecturer of economics at University of Bath and as an assistant professor of economics at the Bristol Business School from 2002 to 2007 before being made associate professor in Creative Writing at the Royal Thimphu College in Bhutan (2010). Professor in Politics and International Relations at the University of Westminster. She has published widely on themes relating to democracy, political economy, Hindutva/Indian politics, misogyny, technology/Artificial Intelligence, identity, rise of right-wing nationalism, feminist and postcolonial critiques, small states in geopolitics, regions of Bhutan, Kerala, and Kashmir. Having received multiple research grants and awards for her research, writing, and activism, she is the author of over 150 publications, including 7 single-authored or edited scholarly and literary books, book chapters in numerous critical and ground-breaking edited collections, plus peer-reviewed original research articles in numerous journals across humanities and social science disciplines.

On 22 October 2019, Kaul served as one of the key witnesses at a United States House Committee on Foreign Affairs hearing about the human rights situation in Jammu and Kashmir, following the revocation of special status within India. Kaul outlined extensive UNHCHR reports about the violations of human rights (and democratic principles) in both Indian and Pakistan-administered Kashmir along with the clampdown on communication facilities and mass-detention in the Indian territory at the time.

=== Books ===
Her first book Imagining Economics Otherwise: encounters with Identity/Difference (2007), was a monograph on economics and philosophy and was subject to mixed reception.

In 2009 she wrote Residue, which was the first novel in English by a Kashmiri woman and was shortlisted for the 2009 Man Asian Literary Prize.

== Controversies ==
In February 2024, Kaul was invited to participate as a speaker in a two-day convention, but she was denied entry to India at Kempegowda International Airport, in Bengaluru, Karnataka, even though she carried a valid Overseas Citizen of India credentials. While there has been no official statement from the Government of India on why she was denied entry, speculation is that it was a result of her criticism of Indian Government Policies in Kashmir, including her use of the term "occupied" for the state in her coursework. Kaul's OCI card was canceled in the same incident.

== Bibliography ==
- Future Tense, HarperCollins India, 2020 ISBN 978-9353572631
- Residue. Rupa Publications (Rainlight imprint), 2014 ISBN 9788129124852
- November Light: An Anthology of Creative Writing from Bhutan
- Imagining Economics Otherwise: Encounters with Identity/difference. London: Routledge, 2007 ISBN 9780415383974

== Awards ==
- Man Asian Literary Prize, 2009, shortlisted
