= St. Thomas' School (New Delhi) =

St. Thomas' School, New Delhi

Location
- Mandir Marg; New Hyderabad, Delhi, 110001; India; 28°37′42″N 77°13′46″E

Information
- Other name: Thomasites
- Type: Private school
- Motto: Light To Lighten
- Denomination: Church of North India
- Established: 1930; 96 years ago
- Founder: Helen Jerwood
- School board: Central Board of Secondary Education
- Oversight: Diocese of Agra (Church of North India)
- Principal: Anuradha Amos
- Manager: N/A
- Gender: Girls
- Campus type: Urban
- Colors: Green, brown and white
- Website: www.stthomasgirlsschool.com

St Thomas' School, New Delhi (or STS) is a girls private school in New Delhi, India. It is run by the Diocese of Agra (Church of North India) and recognized by the Department of Education, Delhi. It is affiliated to the Central Board of Secondary Education and prepares students for the All India Senior School Certificate Examination.

The school has another branch at Goyala Vihar, Near- Sector-19, Dwarka, New Delhi. The St. Thomas’ School, Dwarka is a co-educational school and an extension of this school. It was established in April 2006.

== History ==
St. Thomas' School was founded in 1930 by an English missionary, Helen Jerwood, in Delhi at Mandir Marg and Karol Bagh. The aim of Helen Jerwood was to establish an institution for the girl child.

== Campus ==
The school is divided into two, the junior school and senior school, the junior school is located in Karol Bagh and the senior school is located in Mandir Marg. The junior school has classes till Grade V and the senior school has classes from Grades VI to XII. Each school has a library managed by a librarian and other staff. The senior school library has 18000 books, 40 periodicals and magazines, and 6 daily newspapers. The senior school has an auditorium, the Helen Jerwood Auditorium named after the founder of the school. Both buildings have a sports playground and a massive garden for students.

The senior school has three science labs, two computer rooms, a music and dance room, a geography lab, a home science lab, an art room and a theater room. The junior school has a science lab, and a music and dance room. Both the schools have open stages for theater.

== School magazine & E-newsletter ==
The school magazine - The Jyoti Magazine - covers events organized by the schools and also features students' articles, poems, and jokes. It is published in English, Hindi, Sanskrit, and French.

The school E-newsletter - Impact- is made by the students and edited by the editorial board of the school.

== School Cabinet ==
The school elects a cabinet every year. The cabinet has a Prime Minister as the head. A ceremony is held each year announcing the cabinet election results. The school encourages leadership skills and also introduces students to the democratic system of government. Also, the school has 4 houses, Chand Bibi, Madam Curie, Nightingale and Sarojini Naidu, whose captains are also elected by the students belonging to their respective houses.

== Houses ==
The school is divided into four houses honouring four women icons:

- Chand BiBi
- Madam Curie
- Nightingale
- Sarojini Naidu

== Notable alumni ==
- Manushi Chhillar, Miss World 2017
- Vridhi Jain, Miss Teen Universe Asia 2019
- Koyal Rana, Miss India 2014
- Vasu Primlani, social activist
