= Diocese of Agra =

Diocese of Agra may refer to:

- Roman Catholic Archdiocese of Agra
- Diocese of Agra (Church of North India)
