= Phulbani Lok Sabha constituency =

Lok Sabha Constituency in Odisha

Coordinates: 20.474134°N 84.242305°E

Phulbani
- Former Lok Sabha constituency

Constituency details
- Country: India
- Region: East India
- State: Odisha
- Assembly constituencies: 1. Bhanjanagar; 2. Balliguda; 3. Udaygiri; 4. Phulbani; 5. Boudh; 6. Sonepur; 7. Binka
- Established: 1962
- Abolished: 2009

Phulbani Lok Sabha constituency was a Lok Sabha parliamentary constituency in Orissa state in eastern India which was set up in 1962 then abolished in 2009. It was abolished because of the recommendation by Delimitation Commission of India. Each seat should have the same number of residents. When the number changes with respect to time, then the seat boundaries are changed by the central government.

Delimitation Commission had given its recommendations in 2002 but were accepted in 2009.

Due to delimitation, Sonepur and Binika segments went into Bolangir seat. Daspalla and Kantamal segments of Puri seat came into this seat. Thus the new seat so formed was named as Kandhamal.

== Assembly segments ==
Assembly segments which constituted this parliamentary constituency were Bhanjanagar, Balliguda, Udaygiri, Phulbani, Boudh, Sonepur and Binka.

== Members of Parliament ==
Eleven elections were held between 1962 and 2004. Elected members from the Phulbani constituency are:

- 2004: Sugrib Singh, Biju Janata Dal
- 1999: Padmanava Behara, (BJD)
- 1998: Padmanava Behara, (BJD)
- 1996: Mrutyunjaya Nayak, Indian National Congress
- 1991: Mrutyunjaya Nayak, (Congress)
- 1989: Nakul Nayak, Janata Dal
- 1984: Radha Kanta Digal, (Congress)
- 1980: Mrutyunjaya Nayak, (Congress)
- 1977: Sribatcha Digal, Janata Party
- 1971: Baksi Nayak, Swatantra Party
- 1967: Anirudha Dipa, (Swatantra Party)
- 1962: Rajendra Kohar, Ganatantra Parishad (later Swatantra Party)
- 1957: Bijaya Chandra Pradhan (Ganatantra Parishad )
- 1952: T. Sanganna, Nikhil Utkal Adibasi Congress (as Rayagada-Phulbani seat)

== See also ==
- Kandhamal district
- List of former constituencies of the Lok Sabha
