= Somashekhar SP =

Indian robotic surgeon

- Born: Tumkur, Karnataka, India
- Education: MBBS, M.S., MCh (Onco.Surg), FRCS (Ed)
- Alma mater: University of Mysore; Smt. NHL Municipal Medical College; Gujarat Cancer Research Institute; FRCS Edinburgh UK
- Occupations: Surgical oncologist, professor

Somashekhar SP is an Indian robotic surgeon, author and chairman of medical advisory board at Aster DM Healthcare - GCC & India. He is also the global director of Aster International Institute of Oncology in GCC & India. He is the president of the Association of Breast Surgeons of India, editor in chief of the IJGO Springer Indian Journal of Gynec Oncology and council member of The Association of Surgeons of India. He is also the editor of Annals of Breast Diseases.

== Career ==
Somashekhar SP started his career as a consultant and assistant professor in the Department of Oncosurgery at Gujarat Cancer Research Institute, Ahmedabad. Later, he joined Manipal Comprehensive Cancer Centre of Manipal Hospitals, Bangalore. Currently he is with Aster Hospitals as a Lead Consultant in Surgical & Gynaecological Oncology & Robotic Surgeon, HIPEC & PIPAC Super-specialist. Dr. Somashekhar helped to implement IBM Watson for Oncology, an artificial intelligence technology for diagnosis and treatment of cancer.

Somashekhar SP is a teaching faculty for MS-General surgery PG students for Kathmandu University School of Medical Sciences and for Diplomate of National Board (DNB) examinations surgical oncology training program. He is also the reviewer of various scientific journals such as the World Journal of Oncology, World Journal of Surgery, European Journal of Surgical Oncology, Annals of Oncology, Indian Journal of Surgery, and Indian Journal of Surgical Oncology.

== Honors and achievements ==
- Initiated HIPEC program for Peritoneal Surface Malignancy in India.
- Performed earliest & popularized Sentinel lymph node biopsy procedure in India.
- First in India to initiate Robotic Scarless Thyroidectomy programme & TORS

== Research & publications ==
Dr. Somashekhar SP. is the editor and author of Various Text Book and operative Atlas's on Oncosurgery and Breast surgery, Gynecological oncology & Robotic surgery.

- Arora, Vivek; Somashekhar, S.P. (October 2018). "Essential surgical skills for a gynecologic oncologist". International Journal of Gynecology & Obstetrics. 143: 118–130. doi:10.1002/ijgo.12619. PMID 30306588.
- Bushati, M.; Rovers, K.P.; Sommariva, A.; Sugarbaker, P.H.; Morris, D.L.; Yonemura, Y.; Quadros, C.A.; Somashekhar, S.P.; Ceelen, W.; Dubé, P.; Li, Y.; Verwaal, V.J.; Glehen, O.; Piso, P.; Spiliotis, J.; Teo, M.C.C.; González-Moreno, S.; Cashin, P.H.; Lehmann, K.; Deraco, M.; Moran, B.; de Hingh, I.H.J.T. (December 2018). "The current practice of cytoreductive surgery and HIPEC for colorectal peritoneal metastases: Results of a worldwide web-based survey of the Peritoneal Surface Oncology Group International (PSOGI)". European Journal of Surgical Oncology. 44 (12): 1942–1948. doi:10.1016/j.ejso.2018.07.003. PMID 30075978. S2CID 51909602.
- Somashekhar, S.P.; Sepúlveda, M.-J.; Puglielli, S.; Norden, A.D.; Shortliffe, E.H.; Rohit Kumar, C.; Rauthan, A.; Arun Kumar, N.; Patil, P.; Rhee, K.; Ramya, Y. (February 2018). "Watson for Oncology and breast cancer treatment recommendations: agreement with an expert multidisciplinary tumor board". Annals of Oncology. 29 (2): 418–423. doi:10.1093/annonc/mdx781. PMID 29324970.
- Somashekhar, S. P.; Agarwal, Gaurav; Deo, S. V. S.; Chintamani; Raghu Ram, P.; Sarkar, Diptendra; Parmar, Vani (22 June 2017). "Indian Solutions for Indian Problems—Association of Breast Surgeons of India (ABSI) Practical Consensus Statement, Recommendations, and Guidelines for the Treatment of Breast Cancer in India". Indian Journal of Surgery. 79 (4): 275–285. doi:10.1007/s12262-017-1666-3. PMC 5549057. PMID 28827899.
- Somashekhar, SP; Prasanna, G; Jaka, R; Rauthan, A; Murthy, HS; Karanth, S (2016). "Hyperthermic intraperitoneal chemotherapy for peritoneal surface malignancies: A single institution Indian experience". The National Medical Journal of India. 29 (5): 262–266. PMID 28098079.
- Batra, U; Parikh, PM; Prabhash, K; Tongaonkar, HB; Chibber, P; Dabkara, D; Deshmukh, C; Ghadyalpatil, N; Hingmire, S; Joshi, A; Raghunath, SK; Rajappa, S; Rajendranath, R; Rawal, SK; Singh, Manisha; Singh, R; Somashekhar, SP; Sood, R (2016). "Oncology Gold Standard™ practical consensus recommendations 2016 for treatment of advanced clear cell renal cell carcinoma". South Asian Journal of Cancer. 5 (4): 167–175. doi:10.4103/2278-330X.189933. PMC 5184749. PMID 28032079.
- Raina, Vinod; Bhutani, Manisha; Bedi, Rajeev; Sharma, Atul; Deo, SuryanarayanaV.S; Shukla, NootanK; Mohanti, BidhuKalyan; Rath, GouraK (2005). "Clinical features and prognostic factors of early breast cancer at a major cancer center in North India". Indian Journal of Cancer. 42 (1): 40–45. doi:10.4103/0019-509X.15099. hdl:1807/5319. PMID 15805691. S2CID 23913219.
- Somashekhar, SP; Prasanna, G; Jaka, R; Rauthan, A; Murthy, HS; Karanth, S (2016). "Hyperthermic intraperitoneal chemotherapy for peritoneal surface malignancies: A single institution Indian experience". The National Medical Journal of India. 29 (5): 262–266. PMID 28098079.
