= Rajendra Kohar =

Indian politician (died 1971)

Member of Parliament, Lok Sabha
- In office 1962–1967
- Succeeded by: Anirudha Dipa
- Constituency: Phulbani, Odisha

Personal details
- Born: c. 1915
- Died: 4 November 1971 (aged 56)
- Party: Gantantra Parishad
- Other political affiliations: Swatantra Party

Rajendra Kohar (c. 1915 – 4 November 1971) an Indian politician. He was elected to the Lok Sabha, the lower house of the Parliament of India as a member of the All India Ganatantra Parishad. Kohar died on 4 November 1971, at the age of 56.
