= Sribatcha Digal =

Indian politician

Member of Parliament, Lok Sabha
- In office 1977–1980
- Preceded by: Mrutyunjaya Nayak
- Succeeded by: Sugrib Singh
- Constituency: Phulbani, Odisha

Personal details
- Born: 1 March 1941 Linepada, Phulbani district, Odisha, British India
- Party: Janata Party
- Spouse: Surupriya Digal

Sribatcha Digal (born 1 March 1941) is an Indian politician. He was elected to the Lok Sabha, the lower house of the Parliament of India as a member of the Janata Party.
