= Diocese of Eastern Himalaya =

Diocese of the Church of North India

Diocese of Eastern Himalaya is a diocese of the Church of North India. Its seat is Darjeeling. Its area includes states of India as well as Bhutan. There are about 10 congregations in Bhutan. It is likely to be the oldest and largest Protestant denomination of Bhutan.

The Diocese has a twinning agreement with the Presbytery of Lothian of the Church of Scotland (which covers Midlothian and East Lothian in South-East Scotland).
