= United Church of Northern India – Presbyterian Synod =

The United Church of Northern India (UCNI) is a mainline Presbyterian Church society in India belonging to the Protestant Christian denomination. The UCNI was constituted by the union of the Presbyterian Church and Congregational churches in 1924. Since then Congregational churches have been admitted to membership by the Church Courts competent to admit them. UCNI administers its affairs through local churches, Church councils, synods and a General Assembly. The registration numbers used are approved by the UCNI.

== History ==
At a joint conference held in 1918 in Allahabad, several churches proposed unifying Presbyterian and Congregational churches. This led to the founding of the United Church of Northern India on 30 December 1924, at Wilson College, Bombay. This first meeting included the church moderators Rev. Dr. C.A.R. Janwheeler, Rev. Ram Krishan Shahu and Rev. Dr. Robert Allen Hume; Hume was elected as the first moderator of UCNI.

The UCNI is located in the North-West and North-East India. It also operates in Assam, Eastern Hills of Darjeeling, Punjab, Haryana, Jammu and Kashmir, Maharashtra and Madhya Pradesh, covering about one third of India. UCNI has its own constitution, the "Blue Book", which covers rules for the conduct of work, the confession of faith, and rules for the administration in the UCNI. The organization was established with an evangelical, medical, and educational outlook.

In the 18th and 19th centuries missionaries came to India from the United States, Canada, New Zealand, England, Wales, and Australia. In Northern India there were the following missions:

- American Evangelical and Reformed Church
- American Marathi Mission of the American Board of Commission of Foreign Missions
- American Presbyterian Mission
- Canada Presbyterian Mission
- Church of Scotland Mission
- Irish Presbyterian Mission
- London Missionary Society
- English Presbyterian Mission
- New Zealand Presbyterian Mission
- United Church of Canada Mission
- Wales Presbyterian Mission.

== Organization ==
In 1970, some of these churches joined the newly constituted Church of North India (CNI), which was constituted mainly to unify Anglican churches, but some have since returned to UCNI. Today, the UCNI has eighteen church councils under five Synods. They are: North India Synod, Mid-India Synod, West Bengal Synod, Maharashtra Synod, and Punjab Synod; this includes the cities of Ahmednagar, Bombay, Nagpur, Kolhapur, Malwa Rajasthan, Gujarat, Allahabad, Farrukhabad, Mainpuri, Bundelkhand, Garhwal, Kumaon, Gurdaspur, Ambala, Ludhiana, Doaba, as well as the Eastern Himalayan Church Council.

The United Church of Northern India was registered in Firms and Societies (Punjab) in the years 1977–78.

The supreme body of the Trust is the United Church of Northern India. The United Church of Northern India is the founding organization of the General Assembly and Trust Association. The General Assembly and the Trust Association are therefore the agent body of the United Church of Northern India and have an international jurisdiction.

- Ahmednagar church council – 17 churches
- Bombay church council – 7 churches
- Nagpur church council – 4 churches
- Kolhapur church council – 60 churches plus 140 house fellowships
- Malwa church council – 3 churches
- Rajasthan church council – 2 churches
- Gujarat church council – 2 churches
- Allahabad church council – 3 churches
- Farrukhabad church council – 3 churches
- Mainpuri church council – 4 churches
- Garhwal church council – 2 churches
- Kumaon church council – 2 churches
- Bundelkhand church council – 3 churches
- Gurdaspur church council – 3 churches
- Ambala church council – 2 churches
- Ludhiana church council – 5 churches
- Doaba church council – 4 churches
- Eastern Himalayan Church Council – this is among the oldest denominations in India and is a mature self-supporting church with more than 105 churches and 23 house fellowships and in 10 years doubled its communicant membership. As per the census report presented in the EHCC Annual General Assembly held on 27–28 April 2016 in Kalimpong, West Bengal, the total number of members was 11,837.

== United Church of Northern India Trust Association ==
The UCNI Trust Association is Registered under Companies Act (Regd. No. 2912/1938-39) Bombay Public Trust Act (Regd. No. D-97/1955).

== Legal case ==
In 2013, the Supreme Court of India gave a verdict against the CNI and in favour of the First District Church of Brethren of Gujarat. It was titled Civil Appeal No: 8800–8801 of the 2013 [Arising out of Special Leave Petition (Civil: Nos: 16575–16576 of 2012) with regard to the properties and assets of United Church of Northern India (UCNI) / United Church of Northern India Trust Association (UCNITA)/ COEMAR, etc.]: "The judgment is announced on 30 September 2013 in a case entitled Vinodkumar M. Malavia, etc. Appellants Vs. Maganlal Mangaldas Gameti and Ors. Respondents by Honourable Justice Pinaki Chandra Ghosh and Justice Surinder Singh Nijjar." In the judgment, the Court dismissed the assertions of the CNI which had claimed that it had come into existence following the merger of six churches and uphold the order of the High Court of Gujarat. The high court had observed that "The Trust which has been created as a Public Trust for a specific object and the charitable or the religious nature or for the bonafides of the society or any such institution managed by such trusts for charitable and religious purpose, shall continue to exist in perpetuity, and it would not cease to exist by any such process of thinking or deliberation or the Resolution which does not have any force of law."
