= Communion of Churches in India =

Religious organization in India

The Communion of Churches in India (CCI) is an organisation constituting three Indian high church denominations: the Church of North India (CNI), the Church of South India (CSI), and the Mar Thoma Syrian Church (MTC). They consider themselves to be part of the one, holy, catholic and apostolic Church of Jesus Christ in India; even while maintaining each Church's autonomy and traditions. These three Churches are in full communion with one another. They also mutually recognize and accept each other's clergy, interpretation of the Bible, creeds, baptism, eucharist and ministry.

== Formation and history ==
The origins of CCI goes back to the independent internal Theological Commissions appointed by the Church of North India, the Church of South India and the Mar Thoma Syrian Church to explore ways and means to enhance cooperation amongst them and bear Christian witness, in India. This idea of the independent commissions was originally proposed by the Church of North India and accepted by the Church of South India and the Mar Thoma Syrian Church.

The independent Theological Commissions later decided to work together as a Joint Theological Commission. The first meeting of the Joint Theological Commission was held in January 1975 at Madras, which discussed the questions on faith, orders etc. The commission also explored the possibilities of manifesting the unity of the three Churches, in the ultimate fulfillment of the "Mission of the Christian Church", in India. During their third meeting in September 1976, the Joint Theological Commission passed the proposal for a new model of union for these three Churches, which was accepted and a new Joint Council was inaugurated in July 1978, at Nagpur.

One of the recommendations of the Joint Council was a common name, under which the three Churches will function together. This question was discussed by the different Churches. The CSI suggested the name "Church of India". The CNI and the MTC did not accept it, as a new Church did not come into existence. The MTC came up with "The Council of Churches in Communion - C.N.I., C.S.I., M.T.C.", in order to express clearly the bond of unity realized by the full communion between these Churches. The Joint Council did not accept that, either. During the Joint Council meeting held at Charalkunnu, Kerala in November 1999, the name 'Communion of Churches in India' was unanimously recommended by all three denominations, to reflect their growth in unity, over the years. The new name was adopted and announced at the Joint Council Meeting held in Calcutta in November 2000.

== Purpose ==
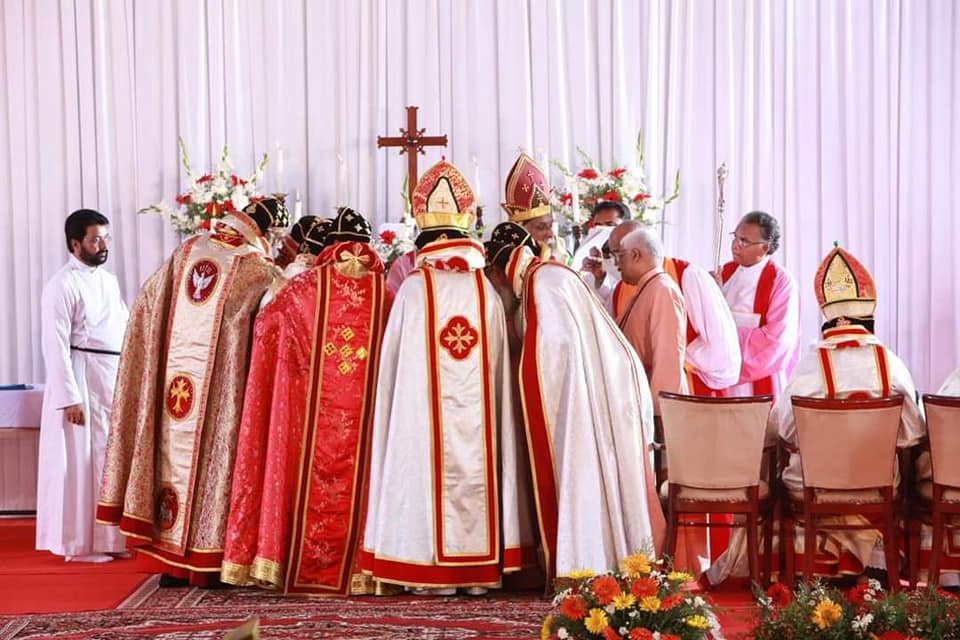
Presentation of crozier during Mar Thoma bishopric ordination by Joseph Mar Thoma, with the assistance of other Mar Thoma, as well as CSI bishops Thomas Samuel and KG Daniel as co-consecrators

As per the terms of the CCI, during the consecration of bishops in any of its member churches, the bishops of the other member churches shall participate. The CCI also developed a common liturgy for use in the CSI, CNI and Mar Thoma churches.

The CCI:

- Aims to serve as a common organ for visible manifestation of unity, witness and service.
- Will assist the churches to address the issues affecting and threatening life.
- Will focus on issues of peace, justice and integrity of creation.
- Will explore new avenues to share and affirm God's love through diakonia.
- Will seek other churches in India to consider joining this union

It has also appointed three commissions to explore the ways of working together: (1) Commission on Mission to find out the possibility of opening new mission centers in different language areas of India in cooperation with one another (2) Commission on Theological matters: to study the implication of closer relationships (3) Commission on Peace and Justice: to consider national and international issues pertaining to Justice and Peace and the response of the Church to such situations.

== Administration ==
- Most Rev. A. Dharmaraj Rasalam, Moderator, CSI
- Most Rev. Dr. P. C. Singh, Moderator CNI
- His Grace The Most Rev. Dr. Theodosius Mar Thoma, The 22nd Mar Thoma and Malankara Metropolitan and the primate of the Malankara Mar Thoma Syrian Church.
- Rev. Dr. D. R. Sadananda, Hon. Executive Secretary, CCI (General Secretary, CSI)
- Adv. Prakash P. Thomas, Hon. Treasurer, CCI (Treasurer, MTC)
- Executive Committee of 18 members including the chief executives of the three Churches
- Commissions and Committees to organise programmes and activities among bishops, pastors, youths, women, and children
- The CCI publishes a common Lectionary and Diary for the regular use of congregations and individuals each year.

The second Sunday of November is set apart as Unity Sunday in all three churches to celebrate the unity that has been already attained and local parishes are encouraged to conduct joint services.

== See also ==
- Christianity in India
