= Baksi Nayak =

Indian politician

Member of Parliament, Lok Sabha
- In office 1971–1977
- Preceded by: Anirudha Dipa
- Succeeded by: Sribatcha Digal
- Constituency: Phulbani, Odisha

Personal details
- Born: 11 September 1922
- Died: 13 August 1993 (aged 70)
- Party: Swatantra Party
- Other political affiliations: Gantantra Parishad
- Spouse: Elamoti

Baksi Nayak (11 September 1922 – 13 August 1993) was an Indian politician. He was elected to the Lok Sabha, the lower house of the Parliament of India as a member of the Swatantra Party. Nayak died on 13 August 1993, at the age of 70.
