= Anirudha Dipa =

Indian politician

Member of Parliament, Lok Sabha
- In office 1967–1971
- Preceded by: Rajendra Kohar
- Succeeded by: Baksi Nayak
- Constituency: Phulbani, Odisha

Member: 3rd Odisha Legislative Assembly
- In office 1961–1967
- Preceded by: Himanshu Shekhar Padhi
- Succeeded by: Himanshu Shekhar Padhi
- Constituency: Boudh

Member: 2nd Odisha Legislative Assembly
- In office 1957–1961
- Preceded by: Balakrishna Mallick, Sadananda Sahu
- Succeeded by: Himanshu Shekhar Padhi
- Constituency: Phulbani

Personal details
- Born: 13 April 1930 Kankala, Phulbani district, Odisha, British India
- Died: 7 April 1990 (aged 59)
- Party: Swatantra Party
- Other political affiliations: Gantantra Parishad
- Spouse: Dharmi Dipa

Anirudha Dipa (1 July 1930 - 7 April 1990) was an Indian politician. He was elected to the Lok Sabha, the lower house of the Parliament of India as a member of the Swatantra Party.
