= Dinesh Chandra Gorai =

Dinesh Chandra Gorai (15 January 1934 – 14 December 2024) was an Indian and Bengali-speaking leader of the Church of North India. He was the first non-Anglican Bishop of Calcutta (1982–1999) and also Moderator of the CNI (1983–1986). He was appointed the first new bishop of the CNI with its inauguration in 1970, to serve as Bishop of Barrackpore (1970–1982). He was the first Bengali moderator of Church of North India (CNI).

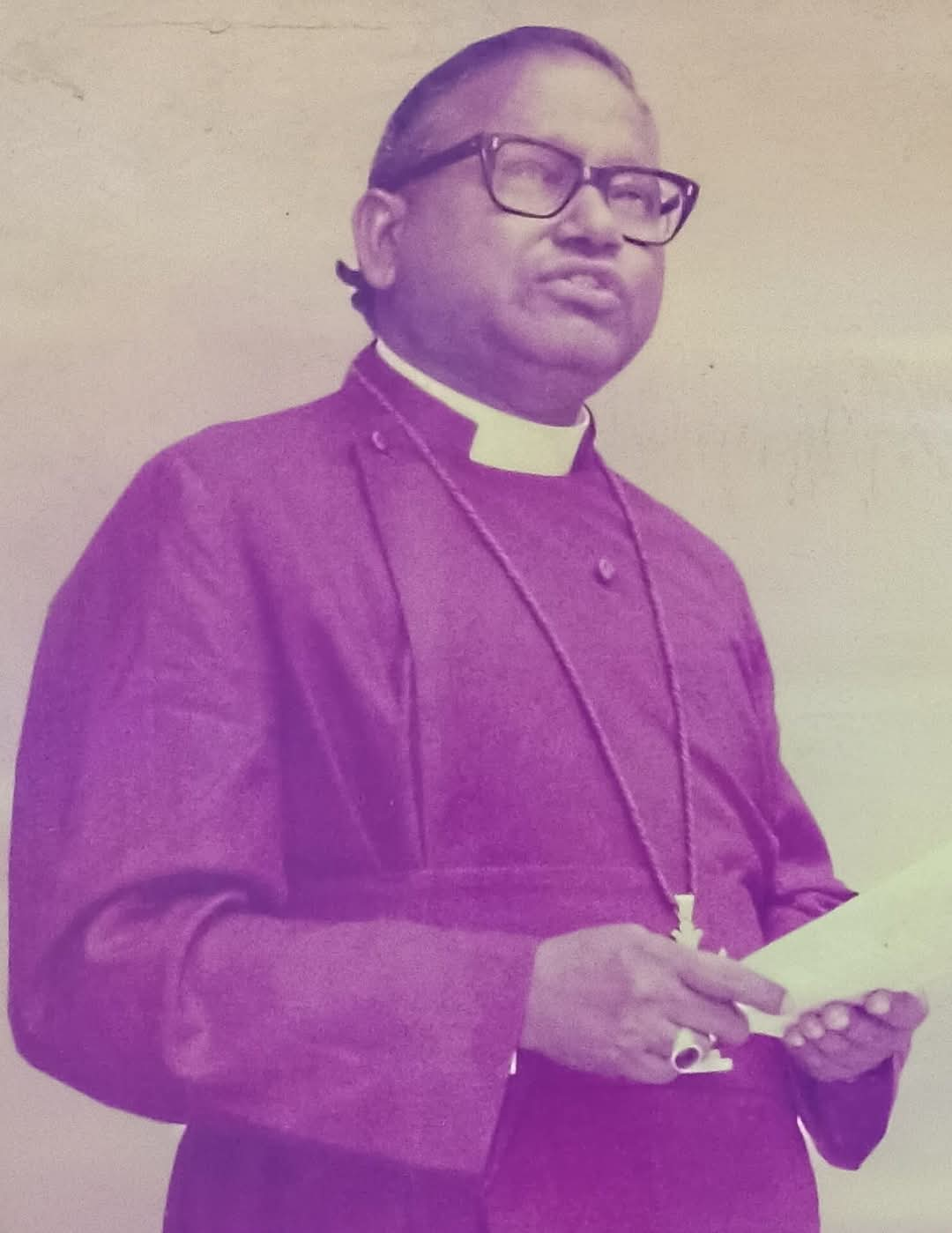
Dinesh Chandra Gorai

== Biography ==
Gorai was born in Sarenga in the Bankura, West Bengal on 15 January 1934. After completing his school education, he studied and graduated from the Bankura Christian College, then under the University of Calcutta.

He engaged himself in multifarious activities of the Church, and its maintenance and expansion at the grassroots.

Gorai died after a long illness on 14 December 2024, at the age of 90.
