= Sandeep Nayak =

Indian surgeon (born 1976)

Dr. Sandeep Nayak
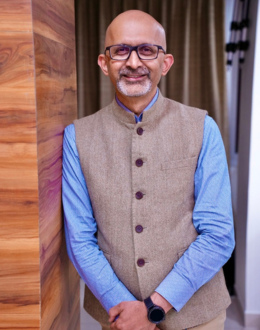
- Born: June 7, 1976 (age 50); Kannur, Kerala
- Citizenship: Indian
- Education: MBBS; Diplomate of National Board – General Surgery; Diplomate of National Board – Surgical Oncology; MRCS (UK); MNAMS- General Surgery, Fellowship in Laparoscopic and Robotic Surgical Oncology
- Alma mater: Kasturba Medical College, Mangalore; Government Medical College, Kozhikode; Chittaranjan National Cancer Institute
- Occupation: Oncologist
- Years active: 1999-present
- Employer: Krishna Institute of Medical Sciences (hospital group), Bangalore
- Known for: Robotic thyroidectomy minimally invasive neck dissection minimally invasive colorectal cancer surgery
- Website: Official website

Dr. Sandeep Nayak (born 7 June 1976) is an Indian surgical oncologist based in Bangalore, India, known as the pioneer of robotic thyroidectomy technique called RABIT (Robotic-assisted breast-axillo insufflation thyroidectomy) and Minimally Invasive Neck Dissection. He is the founder of MACS Clinic, Bangalore. He is the Chairman- Oncology Services, Karnataka, India and Executive director- Surgical Oncology and Robotic Surgery, KIMS Hospital, Bangalore .Nayak was recipient of the KS International Innovation Award for his technique of RIA-MIND (Robotic infraclavicular approach for minimally invasive neck dissection) and Times Health Excellence Award for 2018 by The Times of India. Nayak is the member of Royal College of Surgeons of Edinburgh and American Society of Clinical Oncology. He has previously held the position of the assistant professor at Kidwai Memorial Institute of Oncology from 2012 to 2017.

== Biography ==
Nayak was born in 1976, in Kannur, Kerala. He attended Kasturba Medical College, Mangalore where he graduated in medicine in 1999. He received his postgraduate degree in General surgery in 2006 from Calicut Medical College, Kozhikode. Nayak completed his postgraduate training in surgical oncology in 2010 from Chittaranjan National Cancer Institute, Kolkata. He has received Diplomate of National Board from National Board of Examinations in General Surgery and Surgical Oncology in the years 2006 and 2010 respectively. Nayak received a fellowship in laparoscopic and robotic oncology in 2011 from Galaxy Care Laparoscopy Institute, Pune. He also has international visiting fellowship in surgical oncology from Detroit Medical College as well as Detroit (USA) Fellowship for Surgical Oncology Award.

In the year 2006, Nayak received membership of Royal College of Surgeons of Edinburgh. He also have lifetime membership of Association of Surgeons of India and Indian Association of Surgical Oncology. In 2007, Nayak received grant from Indian Council of Medical Research for his contribution to medical field and significant scientific works. Later in 2007, he was awarded with the executive membership of American Society of Clinical Oncology. Between 2012 and 2017, he also worked as an assistant professor at Kidwai Memorial Institute of Oncology. Nayak has worked with Ministry of Health and Family Welfare on various cancer projects of Medical Council of India. He has also published multiple scientific papers and academic journals on robotic thyroidectomy, minimally invasive neck dissection and modified video endoscopic inguinal lymphadenectomy. Nayak has demonstrated robotic and laparoscopic surgeries at multiple national and international conferences. He is also the founder of MACS clinic in Bangalore where he is the Chief surgical oncologist.

In 2013, Nayak was awarded with Global Excellence Award at International Conference on Innovations in Biotech and Medicine in Bangalore, India. In 2016, his video received Pampanagowda Video Award for Minimally Invasive Neck Dissection (MIND) video at Karnataka State Chapter of Association of Surgeons of India, Shivamogga.

== Scientific publications ==
- AjitSingh Tanwar, Nishtha; Malhotra, Richa; Padmaja Satheesh, Aiswarya; Prakash Khuntia, Satya; Sreekanthreddy, Peddagangannagari; Varghese, Linu; Kolla, Srivalli; Chandrani, Pratik; Choughule, Anuradha; Pange, Priyanka; Gupta, Vinod; Noronha, Vanita; Maruti Patil, Vijay; Pramanik, Raja; Kumar, Sunila; Peraje Nayak, Sandeep; Babu, Suresh; Shetty, Rohan; Kantharaju, Madan; Shekarappa Chinder, Pramod; Korlimarla, Aruna; Srinath, BS; Prabhash, Kumar; Datta Rishi, Kshitij; Madan Goswami, Hitesh; Harini Veldore, Vidya (2023). "Understanding the Impact of Population and Cancer Type on Tumor Mutation Burden Scores: A Comprehensive Whole-Exome Study in Cancer Patients From India". JCO Global Oncology. 9 (9) e2300047. doi:10.1200/GO.23.00047. PMC 10846780. PMID 38085046.
- Khan, Ameenuddin; Reddy, V. Sreekanth; Gangadhara, Bharath; Mayur, M.; Barad, Arunkumar; Munisiddaiah, Devaprasad; Ramakrishnan, Athira; Sadhoo, Abhilasha; Nayak, Sandeep P. (2023). "Robotic infraclavicular approach for minimally invasive neck dissection in head-neck cancers". Journal of Minimal Access Surgery. 19 (3): 395–401. doi:10.4103/jmas.jmas_223_22. PMC 10449050. PMID 36861532.
- Somashekhar, S. P.; Avanish, Saklani; Jagannath, Dixit; Jagdish, Kothari; Sandeep, Nayak; Sudheer, O. V.; Surender, Dabas; Jagadishwar, Goud; Venkatesh, Munikrishnan; Pavan, Sugoor; Prasanth, Penumadu; Ramachandra, C.; Shilpa, Mehendale; Akhil, Dahiya (2022). "Clinical Robotic Surgery Association (India Chapter) and Indian rectal cancer expert group's practical consensus statements for surgical management of localized and locally advanced rectal cancer". Frontiers in Oncology. 12 1002530. doi:10.3389/fonc.2022.1002530. PMC 9577482. PMID 36267970.
- Nayak, Sandeep P.; Reddy, V. Sreekanth; Gangadhara, Bharath; Sadhoo, Abhilasha (2020). "Efficacy and Safety of Novel Minimally Invasive Neck Dissection Techniques in Oral/Head and Neck Cancer: A Systematic Review and Meta-Analysis;". Indian J Otolaryngol Head Neck Surg. 74 (Suppl 2): 2166–2176. doi:10.1007/s12070-020-02066-7. PMC 9702110. PMID 36452741.
- Somashekhar, SP; Acharya, R; Saklani, A; Parikh, D; Goud, J; Dixit, J; Gopinath, K; Kumar, MV; Bhojwani, R; Nayak, S; Rao, S; Kothari, K; Chandramohan, K; Desai, S; Gupta, A (2021). "Adaptations and Safety Modifications to Perform Safe Minimal Access Surgery (MIS: Laparoscopy and Robotic) During the COVID-19 Pandemic: Practice Modifications Expert Panel Consensus Guidelines from Academia of Minimal Access Surgical Oncology (AMASO)". Indian J Surg Oncol. 12 (Suppl 1): 210–220. doi:10.1007/s13193-020-01254-9. PMC 7671751. PMID 33223748.
- Elbalka, Saleh S.; Taha, Anis; Srinivas, Chanduri; Hegazy, Mohamed A.F.; Kotb, Sherif Z.; Elnahas, Waleed; Farouk, Omar; Metwally, Islam H.; Elzahaby, Islam A.; Abdelwahab, Khaled; Fathi, Adel; Tobias-Machado, Marcos; Nayak, Sandeep P (2020). "Short-Term Surgical Outcomes of Standard and Lateral Video Endoscopic Inguinal Lymphadenectomy: A Multinational Retrospective Study". Journal of Laparoendoscopic & Advanced Surgical Techniques. 30 (4): 373–377. doi:10.1089/lap.2019.0733. PMID 31928389.
- Nayak, Sandeep P.; Sadhoo, Abhilasha; Gangadhara, Bharath; Reddy, Sreekanth; Ameenuddin; Munisiddaiah, Devaprasad; Ramakrishnan, Athira (2019). "Robotic‑assisted breast‑axillo insufflation thyroidectomy (RABIT): a retrospective case series of thyroid carcinoma". International Journal of Clinical Oncology. 25 (3): 439–445. doi:10.1007/s10147-019-01568-x. PMID 31667663.
- Sandeep Nayak, P; Pokharkar, H; Jaiprakash, Kapil; Srinivas, C; Vijayakumar, M (Sep 2019). "Efficacy and safety of Lateral Approach-Video Endoscopic Inguinal Lymphadenectomy (L-VEIL) over Open Inguinal Block Dissection: A retrospective study". Indian J Surgical Oncology. 10 (3): 555–562. doi:10.1007/s13193-019-00951-4. PMC 6708014. PMID 31496610.
- Nayak, SP; Devaprasad, M; Khan, A (2018). "Minimally invasive neck dissection: A 3-year retrospective experience of 45 cases". J Minim Access Surg. 15 (4): 293–298. doi:10.4103/jmas.JMAS_40_18. PMC 6839352. PMID 29974878.
- Gurawalia, Jaiprakash; Dev, Kapil; Nayak, Sandeep P.; Kurpad, Vishnu; Pandey, Arun (2016). "Less than 12 lymph nodes in the surgical specimen after neoadjuvant chemo-radiotherapy: an indicator of tumor regression in locally advanced rectal cancer". J Gastrointest Oncol. 7 (6): 946–957. doi:10.21037/jgo.2016.09.03. PMC 5177569. PMID 28078118.
- Nayak, SP; Kiran, J (Oct 2015). "Minimally Invasive Neck Dissection (MIND) Using Standard Laparoscopic Equipment: a Preliminary Report and Description of Technique". Indian J Surgical Oncology. 8 (2): 217–221. doi:10.1007/s13193-015-0474-0. PMC 5427014. PMID 28546725.
- Nayak, SP; Ashraf, M; Dam, A; Biswas, J (Sep 2015). "Internal Jugular Vein Duplication: Review and Classification". Indian J Surgical Oncology. 8 (2): 222–226. doi:10.1007/s13193-015-0452-6. PMC 5427012. PMID 28546726.
- Maiti, GP; Ghosh, A; Mondal, P; Baral, A; Datta, S; Samadder, S; Nayak, SP; Chakrabarti, J; Biswas, J; Sikdar, N; Chowdhury, S; Roy, B; Roychowdhury, S; Panda, CK (Feb 2015). "SNP rs1049430 in the 3'-UTR of SH3GL2 regulates its expression: Clinical and prognostic implications in head and neck squamous cell carcinoma". Biochim Biophys Acta. 1852 (5): 1059–1067. doi:10.1016/j.bbadis.2015.02.009. PMID 25728707.
- Nayak, SP; Sigh, V; Dam, A; Bhowmik, A; Jadhav, TS; Ashraf, M; Shah, RK; Biswas, J (2013). "Mechanism of Thyroid Gland Invasion in Laryngeal Cancer and Indications for Thyroidectomy". Indian J Otolaryngol Head Neck Surg. 65 (1): 69–73. doi:10.1007/s12070-012-0530-9. PMC 3718952. PMID 24427619.
- Ashraf, M; Jha, JK; Mukherjee, N; Panda, CK; Nayak, S; Jadhav, TS; Dikshit, N; Nath, NC; Chakraborty, J; Biswas, J (2011). "BRCA1 protein expression and its correlation with ER/PR status in sporadic and familial breast cancer in Eastern Indian patients—a hospital based study". J Indian Med Assoc. 109 (12): 873–8. PMID 23469566.
- Ashraf, M; Biswas, J; Jha, J; Nayak, S; Singh, V; Majumdar, S; Bhowmick, A; Dam, A (Dec 2011). "Clinical utility and prospective comparison of ultrasonography and computed tomography imaging in staging of neck metastases in head and neck squamous cell cancer in an Indian setup". Int J Clin Oncol. 16 (6): 686–93. doi:10.1007/s10147-011-0250-2. PMID 21674359.
- Ashraf, M; Jha, J; Choudhry, A; Aggarwal, B; Nayak, S; Chakraborty, J; Majumder, S; Biswas, J (2011). "Neoadjuvant and adjuvant therapy with imatinib for locally advanced gastrointestinal stromal tumors in eastern Indian patients". Asian Pac J Cancer Prev. 12 (8): 2059–64. PMID 22292651.
- Nayak, SP; Sreejayan, MP (2010). "Management of supernumerary testis in an adult: case report and review". Andrologia. 43 (2): 149–152. doi:10.1111/j.1439-0272.2009.01026.x. PMID 21382070.
- Ashraf, M; Biswas, J; Majumdar, S; Nayak, S; Alam, N; Mukherjee, KK; Gupta, S (2009). "Tamoxifen use in Indian women--adverse effects revisited". Asian Pac J Cancer Prev. 10 (4): 609–12. PMID 19827879..
- Nayak, SP; Sasi, MP; Sreejayan, MP; Mandal, S (2009). "A case-control study of role of diet in colorectal carcinoma in a South Indian Population". Asian Pac J Cancer Prev. 10 (4): 565–8. PMID 19827870.
- Nayak, SP; Venugopalan, PP; Prabhu, GGL (1999). "Can Diet Predispose to Urinary Tract Infection?". Ind J Urol. 15 (2): 93–99.
