= Bijay Kumar Nayak =

Church of North India bishop

The Most Reverend Bijay Kumar Nayak
- Moderator of the Church of North India; Bishop of Agra
- Church: Church of North India
- Diocese: Agra
- In office: 2022–2025
- Predecessor: Prem Singh
- Successor: Paritosh Canning

Bijay Kumar Nayak is an Indian Protestant bishop. He became bishop of the Diocese of Phulbani in the Church of North India in 2005. In 2022, he succeeded P.C. Singh for a three-year term as moderator of the Church of North India following Singh's defrocking and charges of money laundering. As moderator, Nayak was one of the primates of the Anglican Communion. In addition to serving as moderator, Nayak became bishop of Agra in February 2024.
