= Gujarat Cancer Research Institute =

- Government of Gujarat and Gujarat Cancer Society (GCS)

- Location in Ahmedabad, Gujarat Gujarat Cancer Research Institute (Gujarat)

Geography
- Location: Shahibaug, Ahmedabad, Gujarat, India
- Coordinates: 23°03′0″N 72°36′26″E

Services
- Beds: 500

History
- Founded: 1972

Links
- Website: http://www.cancerindia.org

Gujarat Cancer Research Institute (GCRI) is a state owned cancer research institute in Ahmedabad, Gujarat, India. It was established in 1972. It is one of the 25 government funded Regional Cancer Centres in India.

== Rankings ==
University and college rankings

Medical – India
- NIRF (2024): 45

The institute was ranked 45th among medical colleges in India by the National Institutional Ranking Framework (NIRF) in 2024.
