= Church of North India =

Dominant united Protestant church in North India

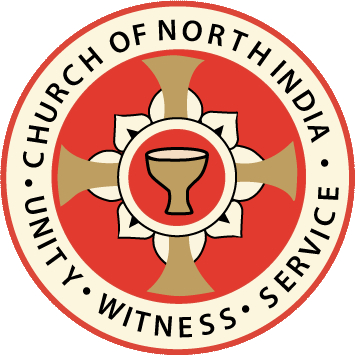
- Official seal of the Church of North India
- Classification: Protestant
- Orientation: United church: (Anglican, Methodist and Presbyterian)
- Polity: Episcopal
- Moderator: The Most Rev. Dr. Paritosh Canning
- Deputy Moderator: The Rt. Rev. Dr. Silvans S Christian
- General Secretary: The Rev. Dr. D. J. Ajith Kumar
- Distinct fellowships: World Council of Churches, Council for World Mission, Christian Conference of Asia, Communion of Churches in India, National Council of Churches in India
- Associations: Anglican Communion; World Methodist Council; World Communion of Reformed Churches
- Region: All of India except Andhra Pradesh, Telangana, Lakshadweep, Karnataka, Kerala and Tamil Nadu
- Origin: 29 November 1970; Nagpur
- Merger of: Church of India, Pakistan, Burma and Ceylon; United Church of Northern India, Methodist Church; Disciples of Christ
- Separations: United Church of Northern India – Presbyterian Synod
- Congregations: 3500 congregations in 3000 parishes and 28 dioceses
- Members: 2,300,000 (2025)
- Ministers: 2000+
- Hospitals: 65 hospitals and nine nursing schools.
- Secondary schools: 564+ educational institutions and three technical schools.
- Official website: cnisynod.org

The Church of North India (CNI) is the dominant united Protestant church in Northern India. It was established on 29 November 1970 by bringing together most of the Protestant churches working in northern India. It is a province of the worldwide Anglican Communion and a member of the World Methodist Council and the World Communion of Reformed Churches. The merger, which had been in discussions since 1929, came eventually between the Church of India, Pakistan, Burma and Ceylon (Anglican), the Methodist Church, Disciples of Christ, and some congregations from the United Church of Northern India (Congregationalist and Presbyterian).

The CNI's jurisdiction covers all states of India with the exception of the five states in the south (Andhra Pradesh, Telangana, Karnataka, Kerala and Tamil Nadu which are under the jurisdiction of the Church of South India). It has approximately 2,300,000 members (0.2% of the population of its constituent states) in 3,000 pastorates.

== History ==
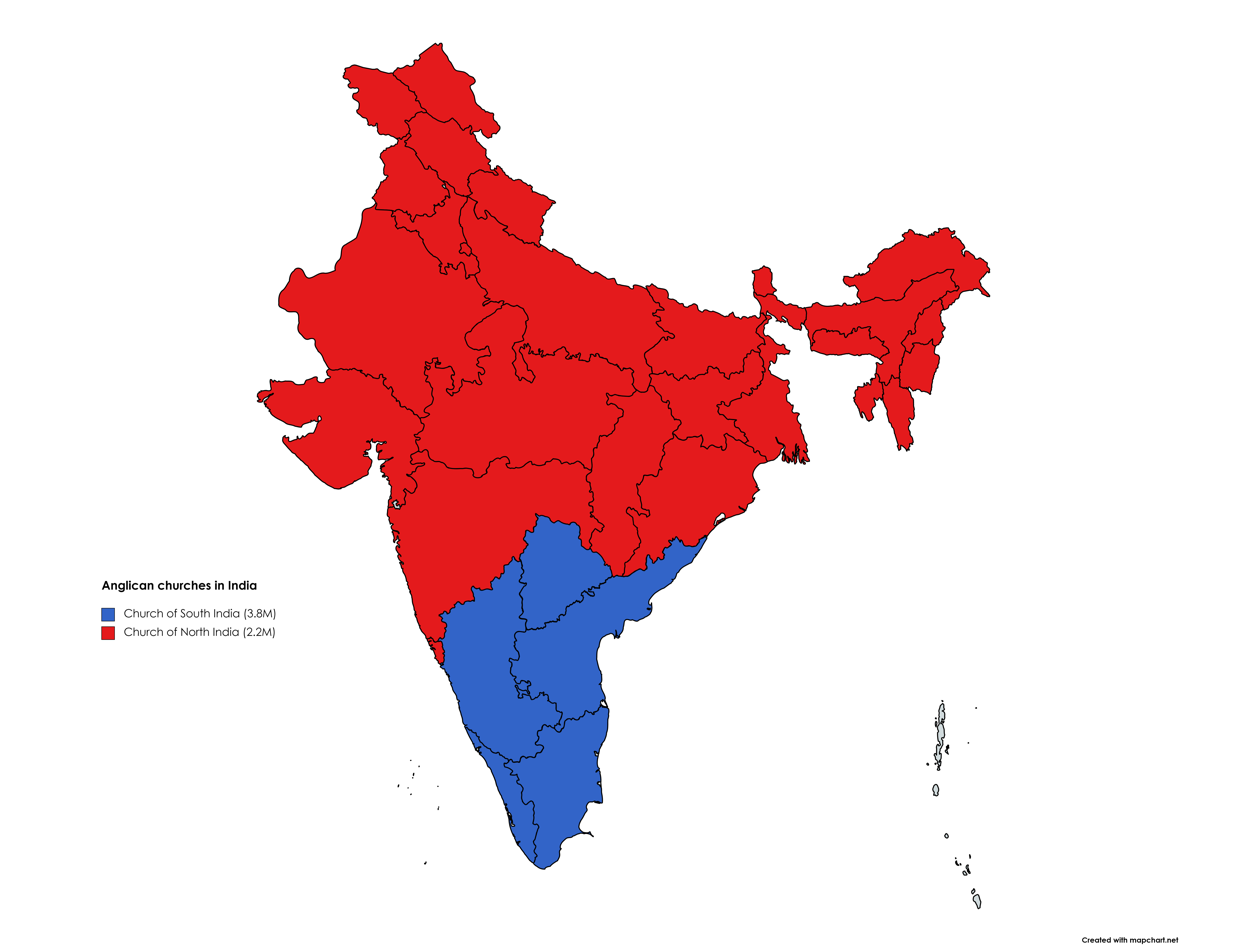
Church of North India in red and Church of South India in blue

Ecumenical discussions with a view to a unified church were initiated by the Australian Churches of Christ Mission, the Methodist Church of Australia, the Wesleyan Methodist Church, the Methodist Episcopal Church and the United Church of Northern India during a religious convention in Lucknow in 1929.

A negotiation committee was set up in 1951 using the plan of Church Union that resulted from the earlier consultations as its basis. The committee was composed of representatives from the Baptist Churches in Northern India; the Church of India, Pakistan, Burma and Ceylon; the Methodist Church (British and Australian conferences); the Methodist Church in Southern Asia; and the United Church of Northern India (UCNI). The Methodist Episcopal Church, however, did not join the discussions and, in 1981, it became the Methodist Church in India (MCI). In 1957, the Church of the Brethren in India and the Disciples of Christ denominations joined in the negotiations as well.

A new negotiation committee was set up in 1961 with representatives from all the above-mentioned denominations. In 1965, a finalized plan of Church Union, known as the 4th Plan of Union 1965, was made. The union was formalized on 29 November 1970 when all the negotiating churches were united as the Church of North India with the exception of the Methodist Church in Southern Asia, which decided not to join the union.

== Beliefs and practices ==
The CNI is a trinitarian church that draws from the traditions and heritage of its constituent denominations. The basic creeds of the CNI are the Apostles' Creed and the Nicene Creed of 381 AD.

=== Liturgy ===
The liturgy of the CNI is of particular interest, as it combines many traditions, including that of the Methodists and such smaller churches as the Church of the Brethren and the Disciples of Christ. Provision is given for diverse liturgical practices and understandings of the divine revelation.

=== Ordination ===
Men and women may be ordained deacons, presbyters, and bishops. The CNI approved the ordination of women to the priesthood in 1977. In 2024, the CNI ordained the first woman to serve as a bishop within the CNI. In June, 2024, a second woman was ordained a bishop. In 2025, the CNI ordained a third woman as bishop.

=== Governance ===
The polity of the CNI brings together the episcopal, the presbyterial and the congregational elements in an effort to reflect the polity of the churches which entered into union. The episcopacy of the CNI is both historical as well as constitutional. There are 26 dioceses, each under the supervision of a bishop. The main administrative and legislative body is the synod, which meets once every three years to elect a presiding bishop, called a moderator, and an executive committee. The moderator acts as the head of the church for a fixed term; another bishop is elected Deputy Moderator.

=== Social involvement ===
Social involvement is a major emphasis in the CNI. There are synodal boards in charge of various ministries: Secondary, Higher, Technical and Theological Education, Health Services, Social Services, Rural Development, Literature and Media. There is also a synodal Programme Office which seeks to protect and promote peace, justice, harmony and dignity of life.

The CNI currently operates 65 hospitals, nine nursing schools, 250 educational institutions and three technical schools. Some of the oldest and well-respected educational institutions in India like Scottish Church College in Calcutta, La Martiniere Calcutta, Wilson College in Mumbai, St. James' School, Calcutta, Hislop College in Nagpur, St. John's Diocesan Girls' School, Calcutta, St. Paul's School in Darjeeling, St. John's College, Agra, Bishop Cotton School in Shimla, Christ Church College, Kanpur, Sherwood College in Nainital, Ewing Christian College, Boys' High School & College in Prayagraj are under the administration of the CNI.

=== Ecumenism ===
The CNI participates in many ecumenical bodies as a reflection of its commitment towards church unity. Domestically it participates in a joint council with the Church of South India and the Mar Thoma Syrian Church known as the Communion of Churches in India. It is also a member of the National Council of Churches in India. Regionally, the CNI participates in the Christian Conference of Asia and on an international level it is a member of the World Council of Churches, the Council for World Mission, World Alliance of Reformed Churches, World Methodist Council and in full communion with the Anglican Communion. The CNI is also in partnership with many other domestic, regional and international Christian agencies.

== Gallery ==
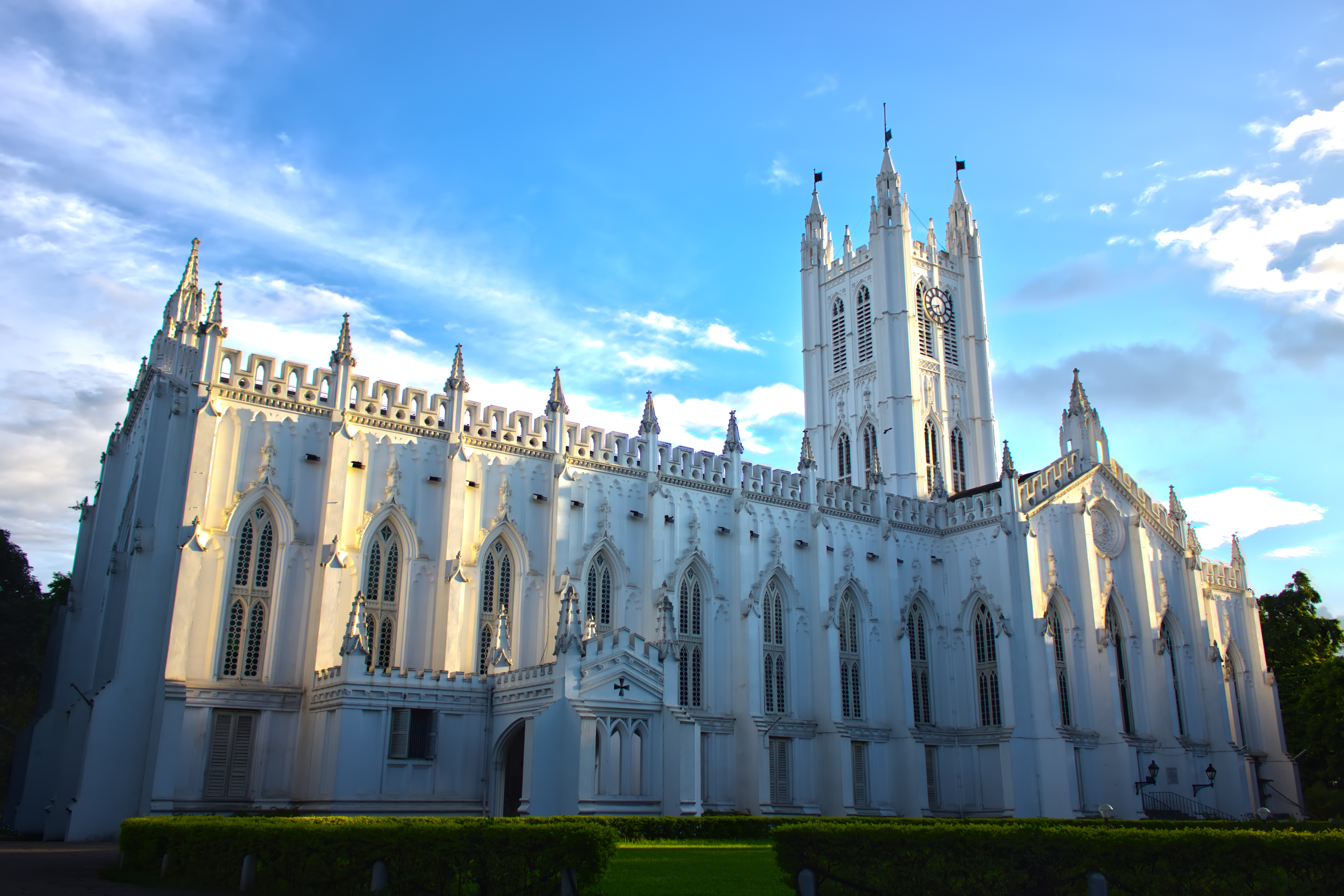
St. Paul's Cathedral, Kolkata

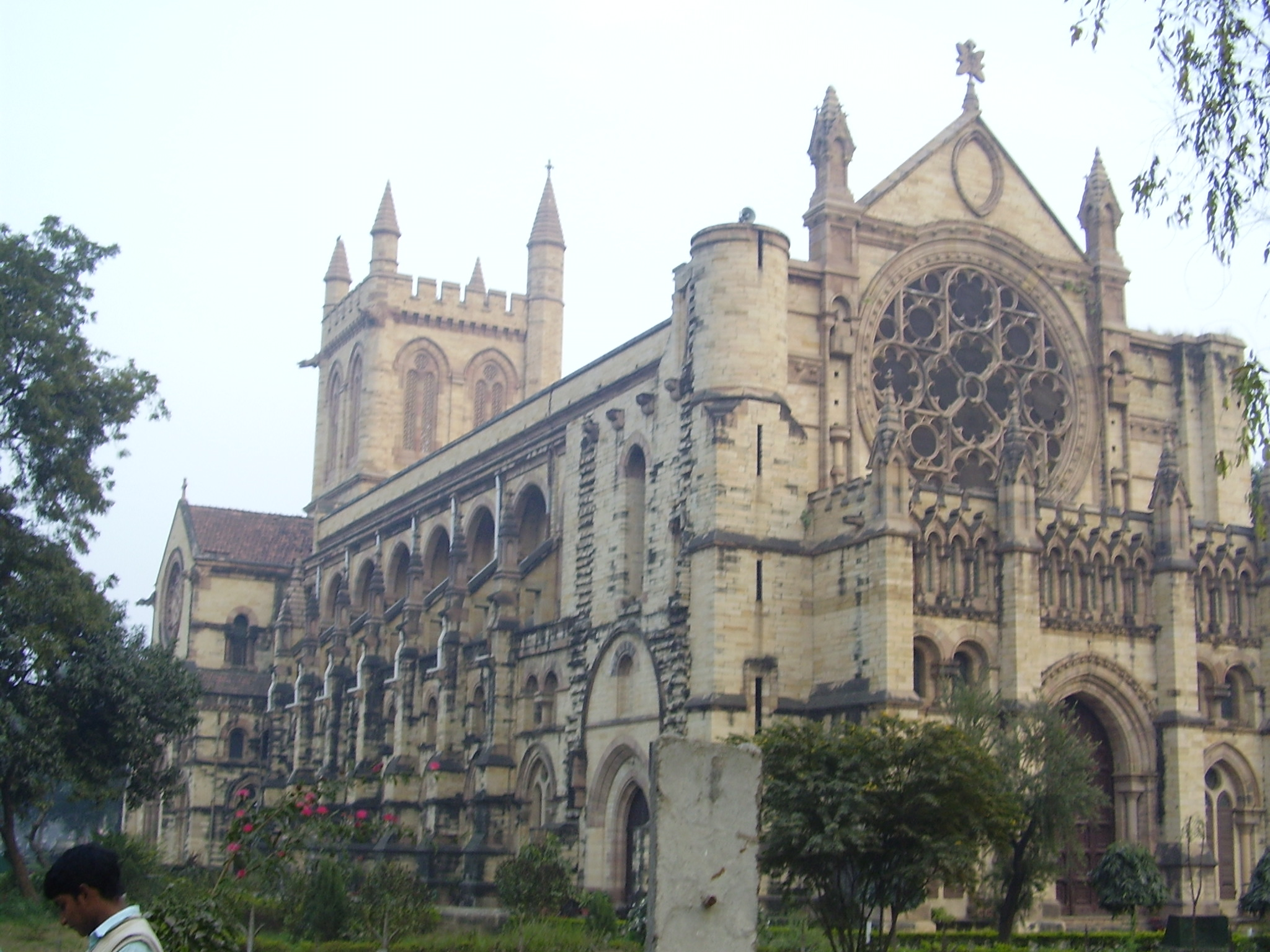
All Saints Cathedral, Prayagraj

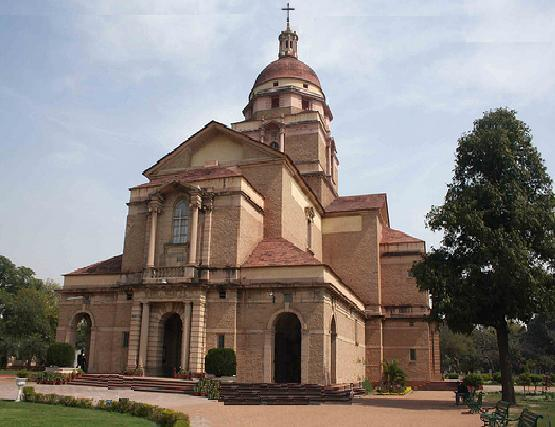
Cathedral Church of the Redemption, New Delhi

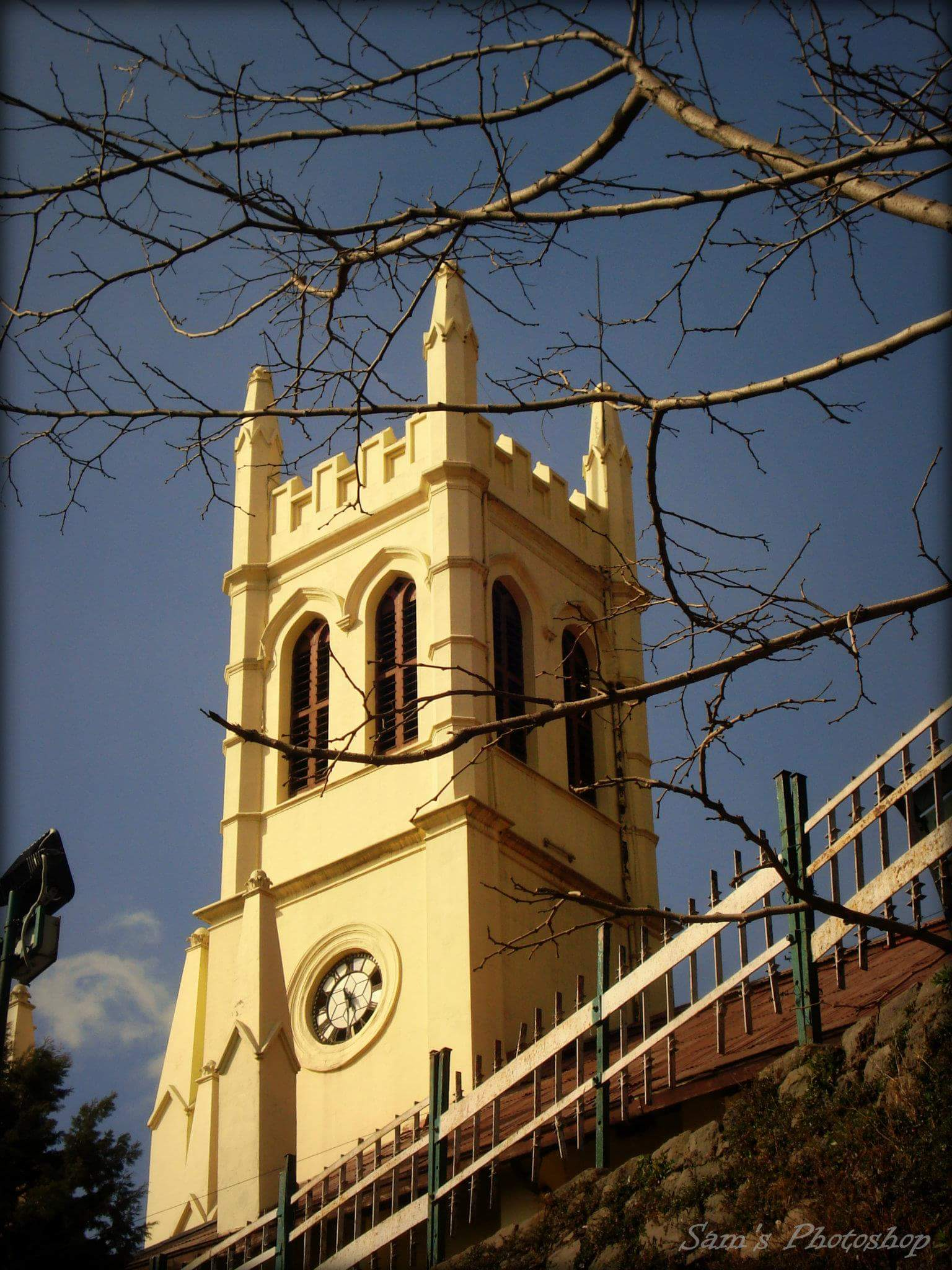
Christ Church, Shimla

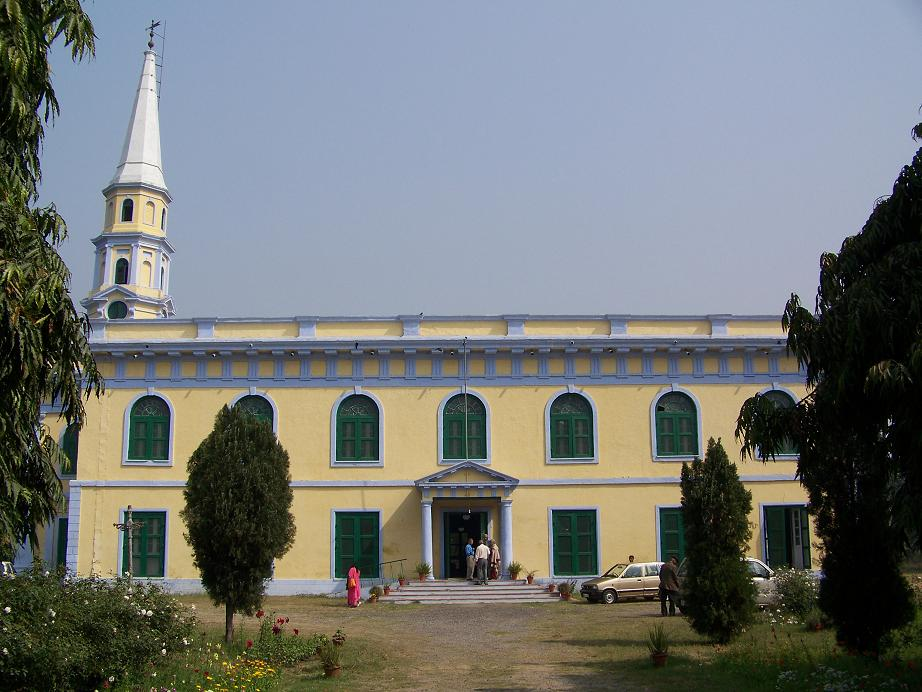
St. John's Church, Meerut

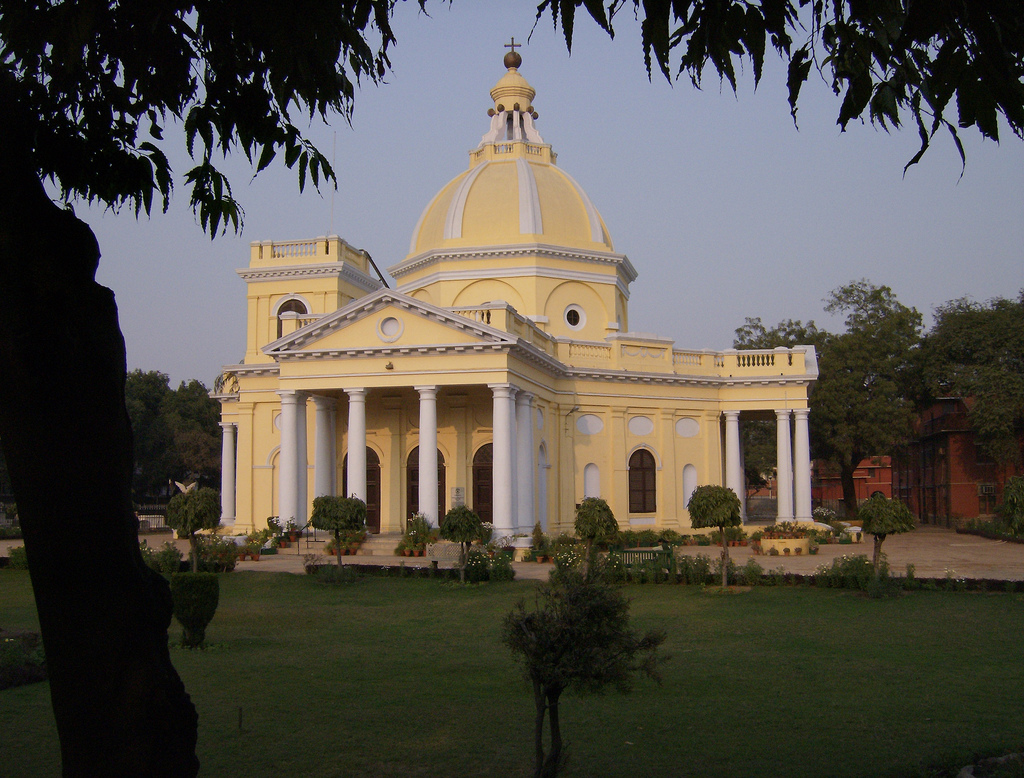
St. James' Church, New Delhi

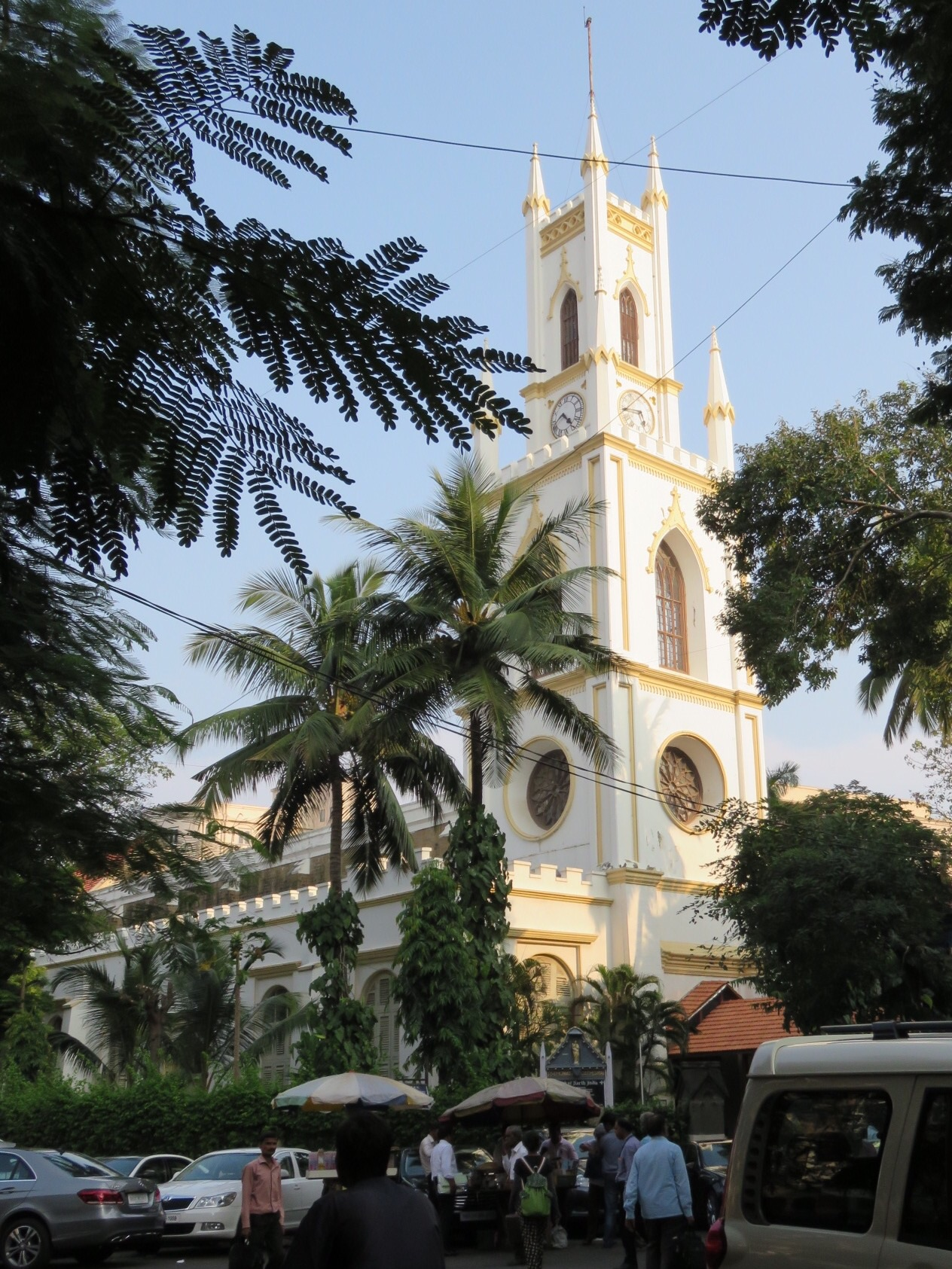
St. Thomas' Cathedral, Mumbai

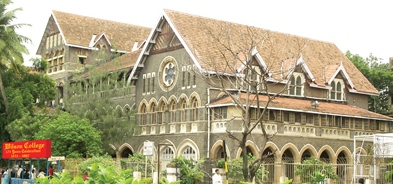
The Wilson College, Mumbai

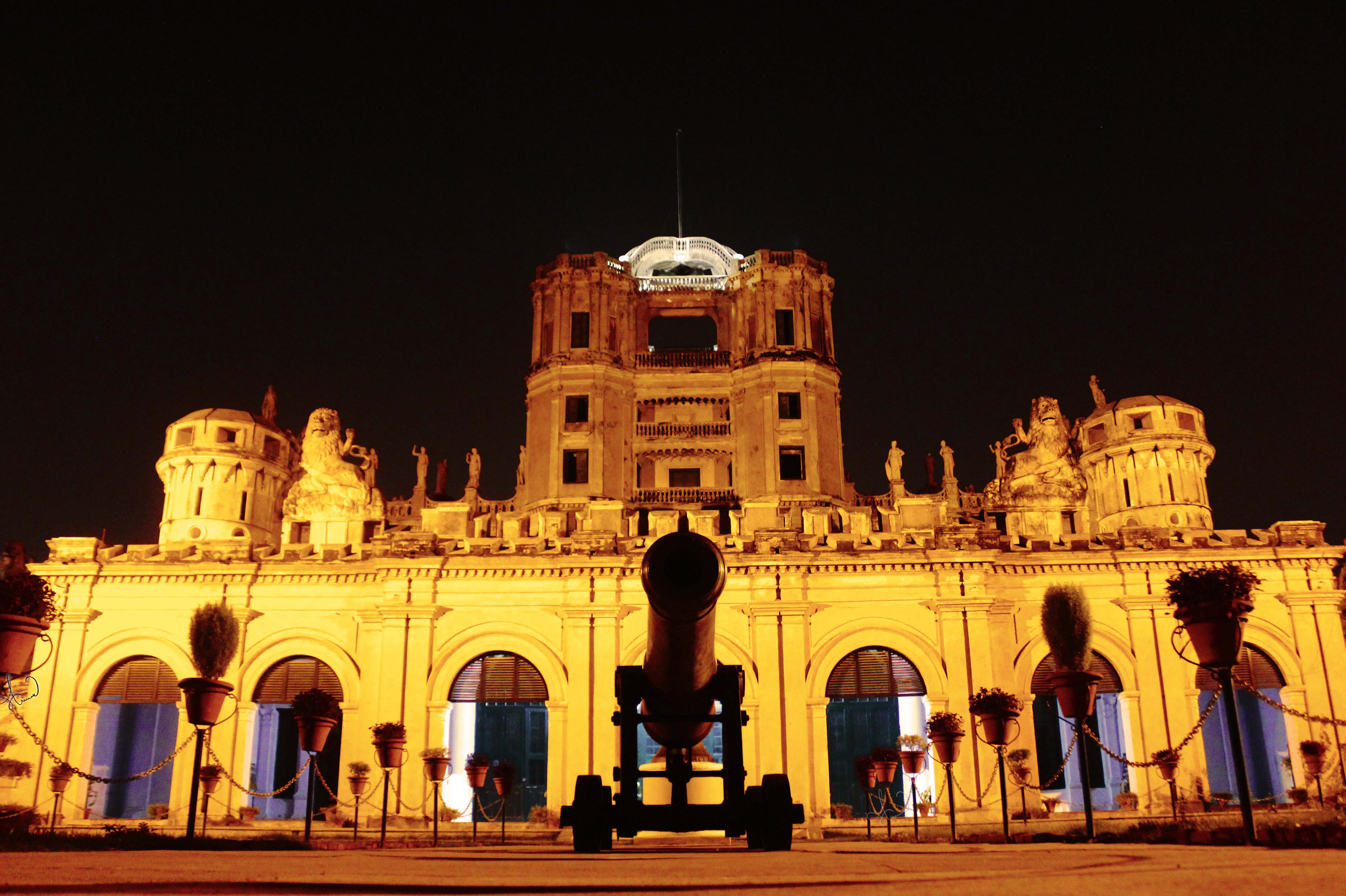
La Martiniere College, Lucknow

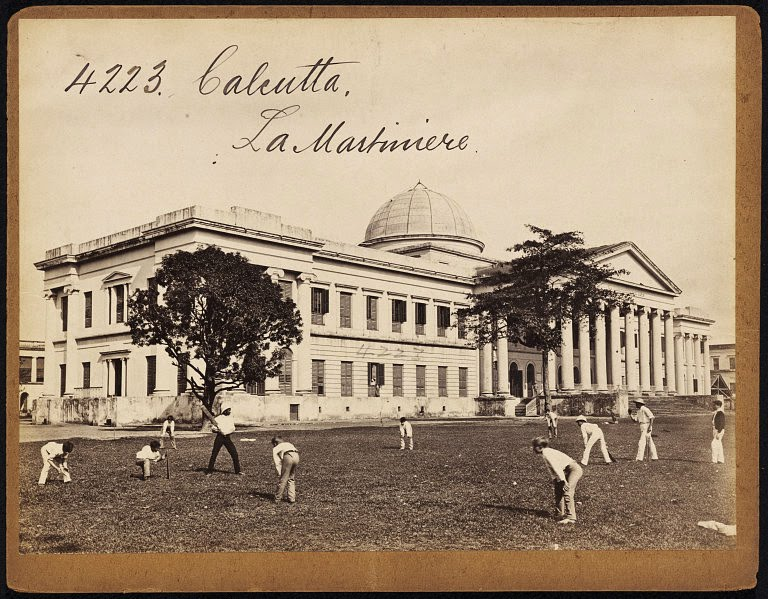
La Martiniere College, Calcutta

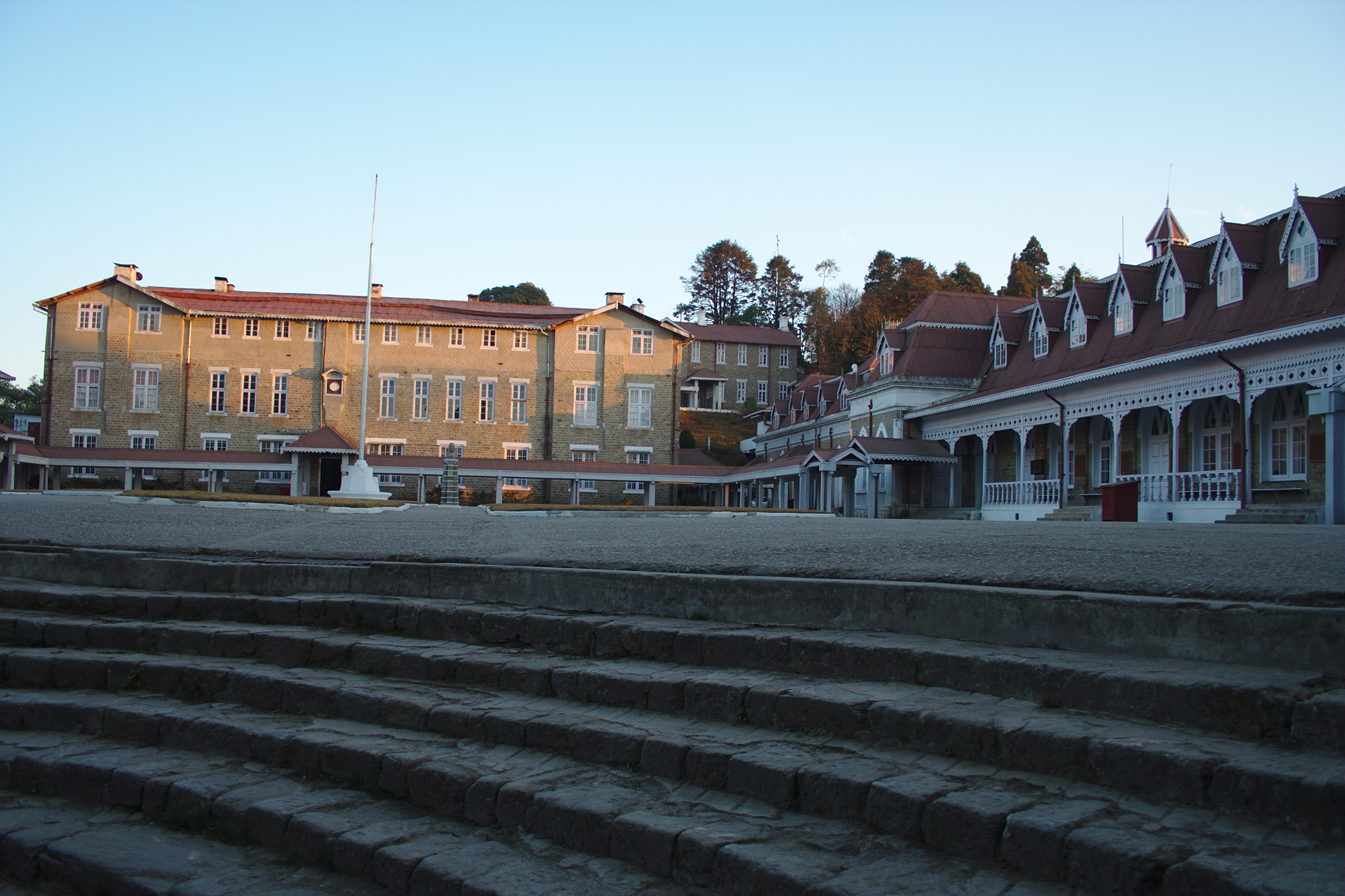
St. Paul's School, Darjeeling

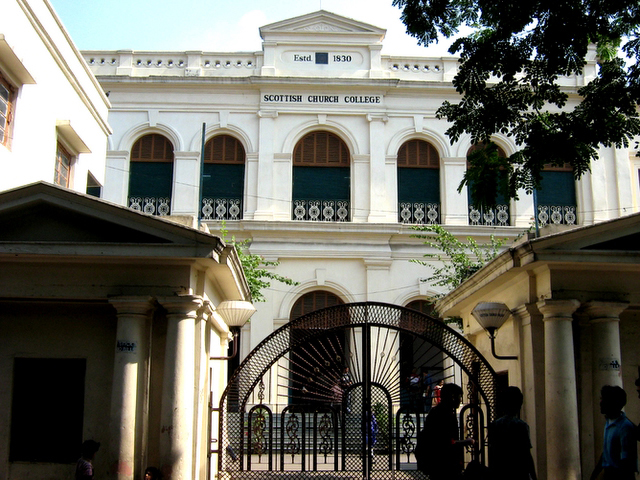
Scottish Church College, Calcutta

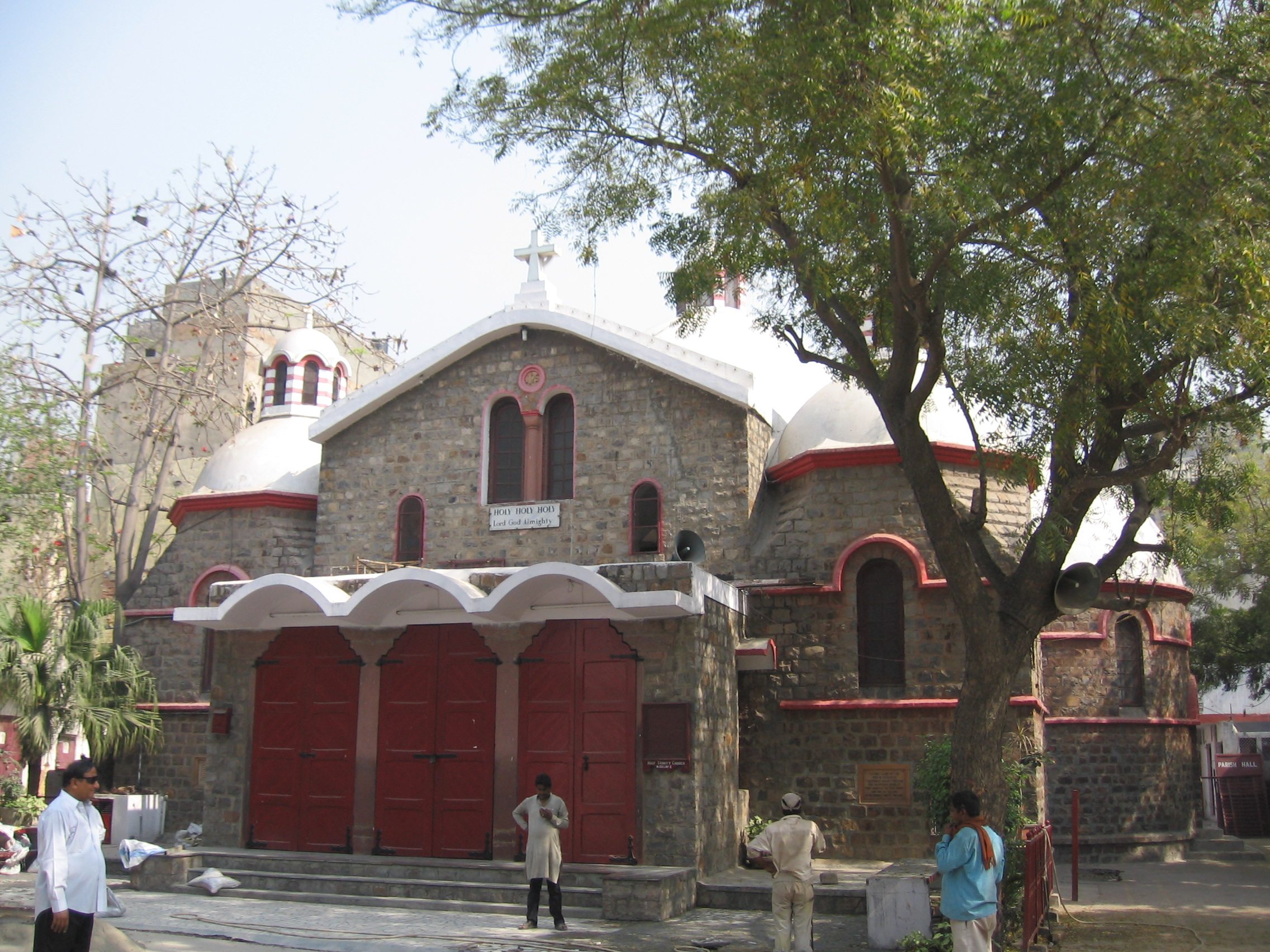
Holy Trinity Church, New Delhi

St. Paul's Church, Pune - photographed during British era

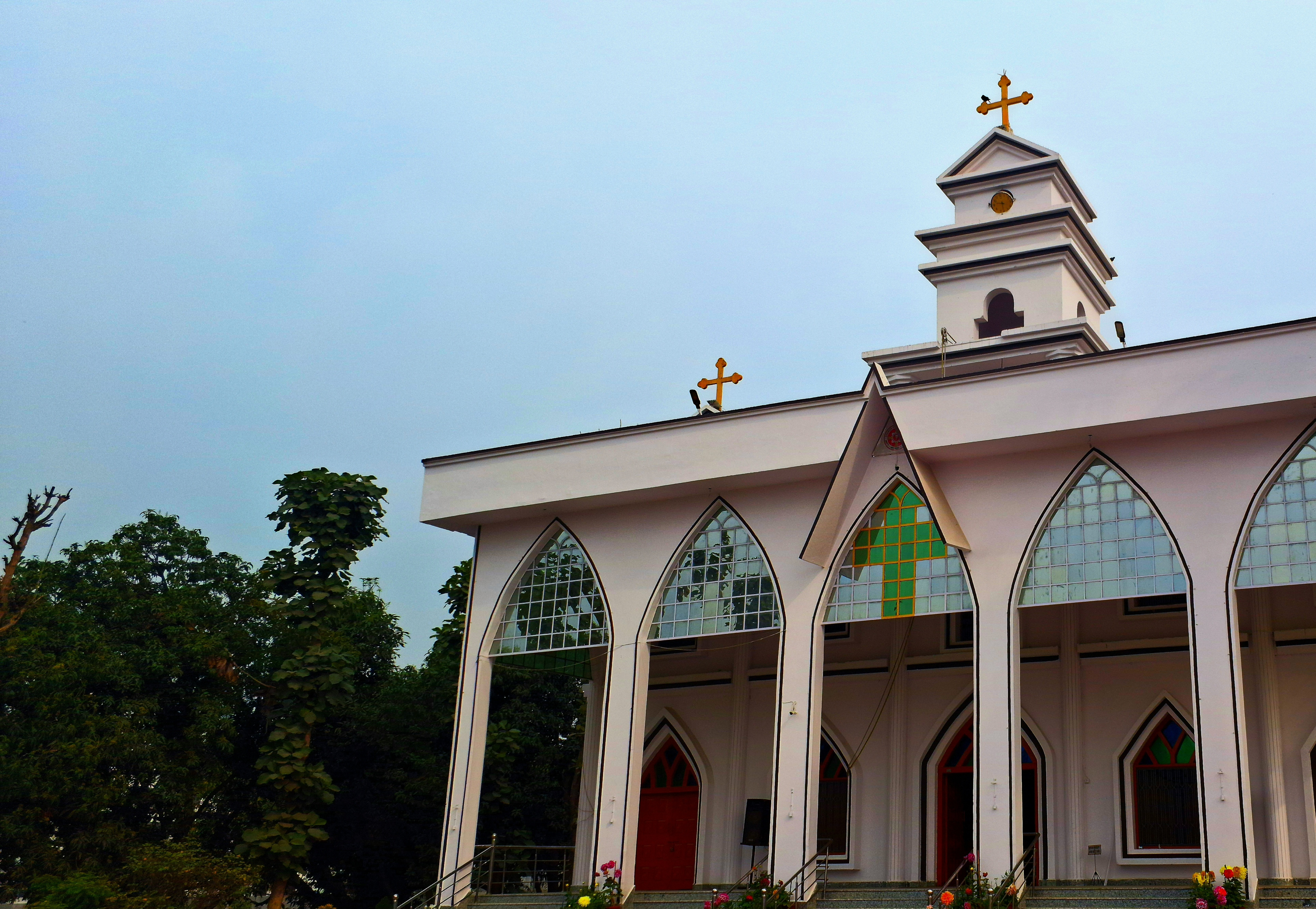
Exterior view of St. John's Church, Gorakhpur

== Present administrators ==
- Moderator: The Most Rev. Dr. Paritosh Canning
- Deputy Moderator: The Rt. Rev. Silvans S. Christian, Bishop, Diocese of Gujarat
- Treasurer: Mr. Subrata Gorai
- General Secretary: The Revd. Dr. D.J. Ajith Kumar

== Moderators ==
Since its formation in 1970, the Synod of the CNI has elected a Moderator and one Deputy every three years.

Term	Moderator	Deputy Moderator
April 1971 – July 1974	Eric Nasir, Bishop in Delhi (and Rajasthan)	Ramchandra Bhandare, Bishop in Nagpur
July 1974 – October 1977	Eric Nasir, Bishop in Delhi (and Rajasthan)	Ramchandra Bhandare, Bishop in Nagpur
October 1977 – October 1980	Eric Nasir, Bishop in Delhi (and Rajasthan)	Ramchandra Bhandare, Bishop in Nagpur
October 1980 – November 1983	Ramchandra Bhandare, Bishop in Nagpur	Dinesh Chandra Gorai, Bishop in Calcutta
November 1983 – October 1986	Dinesh Chandra Gorai, Bishop in Calcutta	Din Dayal, Bishop in Lucknow
October 1986 – October 1989	Din Dayal, Bishop in Lucknow	John Ghosh, Bishop in Darjeeling
October 1989 – October 1992	John Ghosh, Bishop in Darjeeling	Franklin Jonathan, Bishop in Jabalpur
October 1992 – October 1995	Anand Chandu Lal, Bishop in Amritsar	Dhirendra Mohanty, Bishop in Cuttack
October 1995 – October 1998	Dhirendra Mohanty, Bishop in Cuttack	Vinod Peter, Bishop in Nagpur
October 1998 – January 2001	Vinod Peter, Bishop in Nagpur (died December 2000)	James Terom, Bishop in Chotanagpur
January – October 2001	James Terom, Bishop in Chotanagpur	Brojen Malakar, Bishop in Barrackpore
October 2001 – October 2004	James Terom, Bishop in Chotanagpur	Joel Mal, Bishop in Chandigarh
October 2004 – October 2005	James Terom, Bishop in Chotanagpur	Joel Mal, Bishop in Chandigarh
October 2005 – October 2008	Joel Mal, Bishop in Chandigarh	Purely Lyngdoh, Bishop in North East India
October 2008 – October 2011	Purely Lyngdoh, Bishop in North East India	Philip Marandih, Bishop in Patna
October 2011 – October 2014	Philip Marandih, Bishop in Patna	Pradeep Samantaroy, Bishop in Amritsar
October 2014 – 3 October 2017	Pradeep Samantaroy, Bishop in Amritsar	Prem Singh, Bishop in Jabalpur
October 2017 – 23 August 2019	Prem Singh, Bishop in Jabalpur	Probal Dutta, Bishop in Durgapur and Kolkata
23 August 2019 – 14 September 2022	Prem Singh, Bishop in Jabalpur	Bijay Kumar Nayak, Bishop in Phulbani
9 December 2022 – October 2025	Bijay Kumar Nayak	Paul B.P. Duphare Manoj Charan
23 October 2025 - present	Paritosh Canning, Bishop in Calcutta	Silvans S Christian, Bishop in Gujarat

== Dioceses ==
=== Diocese of Calcutta ===
When originally founded in 1813, the fourth overseas diocese of the Church of England covered all the subcontinent, all Australasia and some of Africa. With its 1835 split to create Madras diocese, Calcutta was made metropolitan over all its original area, and has been split many times since. The Bishop of Calcutta remained Metropolitan of India until the CNI's 1970 creation; the current diocese covers parts of Bengal and the bishop is The Most Rev. Paritosh Canning, Moderator CNI.

=== Diocese of Mumbai ===
Split from Calcutta diocese in 1837, the Diocese of Bombay was the last new Indian diocese of the Church of England before all colonial dioceses became independent in 1863. Like Calcutta, Mumbai diocese has been a very large Church of England diocese, a diocese of the independent Indian Anglican church, and now a United Church diocese. The CNI diocese today covers Maharashtra, and the bishop is the Rt. Rev. Prabhu D. Jebamani.

=== Diocese of Chotanagpur ===
Founded from Calcutta diocese in 1890, the current diocese is based in Ranchi, its territory is Jharkhand and the bishop is B. B. Baskey.

=== Diocese of Lucknow ===
The Diocese of Lucknow is an ecclesiastical jurisdiction of the Church of India (CIPBC), with its headquarters in Prayagraj, Uttar Pradesh. Established in 1893 following its separation from the Diocese of Calcutta, the diocese retained Prayagraj as its administrative center despite being named after the city of Lucknow. It encompasses the eastern region of Uttar Pradesh and includes several deaneries such as Jhansi, Prayagraj, Lakhimpur, Gorakhpur, Varanasi, Mirzapur.

=== Diocese of Nagpur ===
The diocese was originally created in 1902/03, from Chotanagpur diocese.

=== Diocese of North East India ===
The CNI Northeast diocese, based in Shillong, North East India is headed by bishop Michael Herenz. It originated as the Diocese of Assam, in the Anglican Church of India, erected from Calcutta in 1915; and became known by the present name before 1986.

=== Diocese of Nasik ===
In 1929, Nasik diocese was founded from Bombay; her present bishop is the Rt. Rev. Darbara Singh.

=== List of Dioceses ===
Diocese	Founded	Headquarters	Location(s)	Bishop	
Agra	1976, from Lucknow	Agra	Western Uttar Pradesh, Uttarakhand	The Rt. Rev. Bijay Kumar Nayak	cnidioceseofagra.org
Amritsar	1953, from Lahore	Amritsar	Parts of Punjab, Himachal Pradesh, Jammu and Kashmir	The Rt. Rev. Manoj Charan	amritsardiocesecni.org
Andaman and Nicobar	1966, from Calcutta	Port Blair	Andaman and Nicobar Islands	The Rt. Rev. Thomas Nathan	
Barrackpore	1956, from Calcutta	Barrackpore	Barrackpore, West Bengal	The Rt. Rev Subrata Chakraborty	dioceseofbarrackporecni.org.in/
Bhopal	betw. 1970–79, from Jabalpur	Indore	Western Madhya Pradesh (Malwa)	The Rt. Rev. Neena Charan	
Calcutta	1813	Kolkata	Kolkata, West Bengal	The Most Rev. Dr. Paritosh Canning, Moderator CNI	cni-calcutta.in
Chandigarh	1974, from Amritsar	Ludhiana	Chandigarh, parts of Punjab	The Rt. Rev. Darbara Singh	
Chhattisgarh	2010, from Jabalpur	Raipur	Chhattisgarh	The Rt. Rev. Sushma Kumar	
Chotanagpur	1890, from Calcutta	Ranchi	Parts of Jharkhand	The Rt. Rev. B. B. Baskey	
Cuttack	1970	Cuttack	Eastern Odisha	The Rt. Rev. Surendra Kumar Nanda	dioceseofcuttackcni.in
Delhi	1947, from Lahore	New Delhi	Delhi, Haryana	The Rt. Rev. Dr. Paul Swarup	dioceseofdelhi.org
Dooars	2024, from North East India	Santalpur Mission Compound, Alipurduar, West Bengal	Parts of West Bengal & Assam	The Rt. Rev. David Roy	
Durgapur	betw. 1970–96	Durgapur	Parts of West Bengal	The Rt. Rev. Sameer Issac Khimla	cnidod.org/
Eastern Himalaya	bef. 1987 — Darjeeling, renamed c. 1992, from Barrackpur	Darjeeling	Parts of West Bengal and Assam, Bhutan	The Rt. Rev. Roshan Thapa	dioceseofeasternhimalaya.com
Gujarat	betw. 1970–96	Ahmedabad	Gujarat	The Rt. Rev. Silvans Christian, Deputy Moderator CNI	
Jabalpur	1970, from Nagpur	Jabalpur	Eastern Madhya Pradesh	The Rt. Rev. Ajay Umesh James	dioceseofjabalpur-cni.org
Lucknow	1893, from Diocese of Calcutta	Prayagraj	Eastern Uttar Pradesh	Rt. Rev. Morris Edgar Dan	dioceseoflucknowcni.org
Kolhapur	betw. 1970–96	Kolhapur	South Maharashtra (Desh)	The Rt. Rev. Manoj Devdan Kate	
Marathwada	c. 2000	Aurangabad	Marathwada, Maharashtra	The Rt. Rev. Prakash D. Patole	
Mumbai (Bombay)	1837, from Calcutta	Mumbai	Western Maharashtra	The Rt. Rev. Prabhu D. Jebamani	bdccni.org
Nagpur	1903, from Chotanagpur	Nagpur	Eastern Maharashtra (Vidarbha)	The Rt. Rev. Paranjtohy Sandela	https://ndccni.org
Nasik	1929, from Bombay	Nashik	North Maharashtra (Khandesh)	The Rt. Rev. Pradip Kamble	
North East India	1915, from Calcutta (as Diocese of Assam), as present name bef. 1986	Shillong	Northeast India	The Rt. Rev. Michael Herenz	
Patna	bef. 1970	Bhagalpur	Bihar and parts of Jharkhand	The Rt. Rev. Francis Hansda	
Phulbani	1997, from Cuttack	Phulbani	Kandhamal District, Odisha	The Rt. Rev. Violet Nayak	
Pune	c. 2000	Pune	CentralMaharashtra	The Rt. Rev. Alfred C. Tiwade	
Rajasthan	1981, from Delhi	Ajmer	Rajasthan	The Rt. Rev. Raimson Victor	
Rayagada	2026, from Phulbani	Rayagada	Rayagada District, Odisha	Newly inaugurated diocese	
Sambalpur	bef. 1996	Balangir	Northwest Odisha	The Rt. Rev. Immanuel Dani	

== See also ==
- Anglican Communion
- Christianity in West Bengal
- Christian Conference of Asia
- Christianity in India
- Church of South India
- Malankara Mar Thoma Syrian Church
- Church of Pakistan
