= Muljibhai Nayak =

Indian actor and director (1892–1971)

- Born: 1892; Umta, Mehsana, Baroda State, British India
- Died: 1971 (aged 78–79)
- Occupations: Stage actor, director
- Years active: c. 1899–1947
- Father: Khushalbhai

Muljibhai Khushalbhai Nayak (1892–1971) was a Gujarati theatre director and actor from Gujarat, India. He was well known for his heroic and Bhavai roles.

== Biography ==
Muljibhai Nayak was born in 1892 in Umta village (now in Mehsana district, Gujarat) in a family of Bhavai performers.

He started his stage career at the age of six or seven for a salary of one rupee in Arya Natak Mandali. He acted in many roles including Ranuka in Bedhari Talwar, Mokalkunwar in Chandravijay, Nanda in Veervijay (1901) produced by Phoenix Gujarati Natak Mandali. He worked with Framji Ratanji Appu's Parsi Natak Mandali.

He was trained in theatre by Amrit Keshav Nayak and in Urdu by Narayanprasad 'Betab'. He played a role of Kumud in Kumudsundari produced by Subodh Natak Mandali. He joined Deshi Natak Samaj in 1904 and later became a partner in it. In 1914, he joined Saraswati Natak Samaj for a salary of 75 rupees.

His roots in folk theatre, as well as experience in conventional theatre, helped him with his Bhavai roles and direction of Bhavai performances which brought him fame. He had also directed several social and historical plays which were influenced by the Urdu theatre. His early roles of Badar in Sati Toral (1915) and Jankinath in Sati Manjari (1921) were much appreciated.

His popular roles include Shahji in Dheersinh in Sanyasi (1912), Hanuman in Sati Sulochna (1914), Ebhalvalo in Ra' Mandlik (1918), Shivaji in Raja Shambhaji (1922), Shudrak in Shalivahan (1927) and Raja Shahji (1938). His role of Shivaji in Raja Shambhaji attracted Marathi people. He was hailed for acting, makeup and an entry on the stage on a horseback in the role of Shahji in Raja Shahji. His roles of heroic men were well appreciated for his heavy voice and acting.

He died in 1971.

== Recognition ==
Muljibhai Nayak was felicitated in Ahmedabad on 13 September 1963 by the Government of Gujarat. He was awarded Sangeet Natak Akademi award for Acting in Gujarati in 1965. He was felicitated by Udaybhansinhji, prince of erstwhile Porbandar State, in Mumbai on 9 February 1966 under the aegis of Deshi Natak Samaj.

== Stage ==
Acting career
Date	Title	Role	Writer	Theatre company
	Bedhari Talwar	Renuka		
	Chandravijay	Mokalkunwar		
1901	Veervijay	Nanda		Phoenix Gujarati Natak Mandali
1904	Vijay Kamla	Roshan Aara	Dahyabhai Dholshaji Zaveri, Chhotalal Rukhdev Sharma	Deshi Natak Samaj
26 October 1905	Sati Sita	Shanta	Chhotalal Rukhdev Sharma	Deshi Natak Samaj
1908	Sati Draupadi	Nakul	Chhotalal Rukhdev Sharma	Deshi Natak Samaj
1910	Jalim Tuliya	Tuliya	Manishankar Ratanji Bhatt 'Kant'	Deshi Natak Samaj
6 June 1912	Sanyasi	Dheersinh	Chhotalal Rukhdev Sharma	Deshi Natak Samaj
12 December 1912	Kulin Nayika	Devsharma	Chhotalal Rukhdev Sharma	Deshi Natak Samaj
12 April 1913	Ajitsinh	Virsinh	Chhotalal Rukhdev Sharma	Deshi Natak Samaj
1914	Sati Sulochna	Hanuman	Chhotalal Rukhdev Sharma	Deshi Natak Samaj
1914	Kusumavati	Khumansinh	Manilal 'Pagal'	Saraswati Natak Samaj
1915	Sati Toral	Badar		
7 December 1918	Ra' Mandlik	Ebhalvalo	Manilal 'Pagal'	Aryanaitik Natak Samaj
26 June 1920	Chhatravijay	Sambhakaran	Collaborative work	Aryanaitik Natak Samaj
1921	Sati Manjari	Jankinath		
December 1922	Raja Shambhaji	Shivaji	Manilal 'Pagal'	Aryanaitik Natak Samaj
1924	Mahadji Shinde	Sadashivrao	Manilal 'Pagal'	Arya Natak Mandali
1924	Saurashtra Veer	Akheraj	Manilal 'Pagal'	Arya Natak Mandali
1 August 1927	Shalivahan	Shudrak	Prabhulal Dwivedi	Lakshmikant Natak Samaj
15 March 1927	Mayana Rang	Devdoot	Prabhulal Dwivedi	Lakshmikant Natak Samaj
1928	Mera Iman	Murad	Munshi Abbasali	Lakshmikant Natak Samaj
2 January 1929	Veerna Ver	Jaisinh	Manilal 'Pagal'	Lakshmikant Natak Samaj
4 February 1932	Samudragupta	Mahendra	Prabhulal Dwivedi	Lakshmikant Natak Samaj
May 1933	Kanyadan	Swami Vidyanand	Kavi 'Manasvi' Prantijwala	Kant Natak Samaj
12 October 1933	Rajkumari	Krishna	Devdutt Tarkas	Kant Natak Samaj
17 January 1934	Sattano Lobh	Pratapaditya	Jivanlal Bhatt	Bhaktivijay Natak Samaj
1938	Raja Shahji	Shahji	Manilal 'Pagal'	Aryanaitik Natak Samaj
1938	Vilaspanthe	Hemchandra	Manilal 'Pagal'	Aryanaitik Natak Samaj
1938	Sarjanhar	Shyamsundar	Manilal 'Pagal'	Aryanaitik Natak Samaj
1942	Garib Kanya	Sitaram	Manilal 'Pagal'	Aryanaitik Natak Samaj
1947	Sagavahala	Ishwarlal	Manilal 'Pagal'	Aryanaitik Natak Samaj
