= Radhakant Nayak =

Indian politician, bureaucrat, and educationist

Radhakant Nayak is an Indian politician, bureaucrat & educationist belonging to the Indian National Congress party. He served as a member of the Parliament of India representing Orissa in the Rajya Sabha, the upper house of the Indian Parliament between 2004 till 2010. Radhakant Nayak, a 1962 batch IAS officer. Nayak is also connected with YMCA and is one of the most high-profile Christians in Orissa

Nayak who served the Central government as secretary was short-listed for the post of Union Cabinet Secretary during H. D. Deve Gowda government. He is the Founder - President of National Institute of Social Work And Social Sciences (NISWASS) which was awarded with the First ever Dr. Ambedkar National Award. Former President of India K.R.Narayanan was the former Patron of NISWASS while Former Governor of Odisha S.C.Jamir is the current patron of NISWASS. In 2004 he was elected to Rajya Sabha on Congress ticket.

== Early years and background ==
Radhakant Nayak was born on 7 February 1939 in Dasingbadi, a village in the Kandhmal District of Orissa. He left Dasingbadi in 1981 and became a permanent resident of Bhubaneswar. Nayak is fluent in English, Hindi, Oriya, Kui and Mala (a variant of Oriya). His son Ranjit Nayak is a senior staff member of the World Bank and currently serves as the chief adviser to the Government of North Macedonia on international and European Union affairs. Nayak previously served as the World Bank's lead (principal) social development specialist for the Europe and Central Asia Region in Washington, D.C. from 2011 to 2013, where he oversaw social development operations in 30 countries, advised governments and World Bank partners on development issues, and led and mentored senior sector specialists within the bank. Prior to that he served as the bank's country chief for Kosovo from 2007 to 2011, and is credited with ensuring the economic and financial sustainability of Kosovo after its declaration of independence in 2008.

== Education ==
Nayak holds a B.A. in Economics and History from Utkal University, and an M.A. in Political Science and Public Administration from Ravenshaw College (Utkal University). He later received his PhD in Development Administration, Administrative Law and Jurisprudence from Utkal University.

== Academic career ==
In addition to his political appointments, Nayak has worked in a variety of academic positions in India and abroad. He served as vice-president of the All India Political Science Association in Chennai, chairman of Utkal University Board of Studies, Social Work, in Bhubaneswar, and as chairman of Utkal University Board of Studies, Social Communication and Journalism. He also served as a member of the Jawaharlal Nehru University finance committee in New Delhi.

Nayak has also held academic positions in France, Germany, the United Kingdom and the United States. He served as visiting fellow at the Institute of Development Studies (IDS) at the University of Sussex, UK. In the US, Nayak served as visiting professor at the University of Georgia in Athens, Department of Anthropology, and as guest speaker at the University of Louisiana and Columbia University in New York. He was also a guest speaker at the South Asian Institute of Heidelberg University in Germany, and member of the World Council of Political Scientists at the International Political Science Association (IPSA) in Paris.

== Professional qualifications ==
Between 1960 and 1962, Nayak earned a variety of professional diplomas and certificates from Orissa Administrative Service (OAS), Orissa Education Service (OES), Indian Police Service (IPS) and the Indian Administration Service (IAS).

== Public office within the Government of India ==
Nayak has held positions in many public offices over the years. From 1996 to 1997 he served as secretary of the Inter-State Council Secretariat in the Ministry of Home Affairs in New Delhi. From 1994 to 1995 Nayak was secretary of the Ministry of Rural Development within the Department of Rural Employment and Poverty Alleviation, prior to which he served as managing director of the Tribal Cooperative Marketing Development from 1993 to 1994. This office came under the Federation of India Limited (TRIFED) within the Ministry of Welfare.

During the 1980s Nayak held a variety of roles with the Government of Orissa in Bhubaneswar. As special secretary to the Government Administration Department, he was charged with dealing with capital administration, parliamentary affairs, personnel and training, as well as administrative reforms, vigilance and all India and Orissa civil services.

Prior to that he served as secretary to the governor of Orissa, His excellency Professor Saiyid Nurul Hasan, and as chairman of Industrial Infrastructure Development Corporation in Bhubaneswar, Orissa.

== Controversies ==
In October 2007, the Kandhamal district Kui Samaj Coordination Committee demanded his resignation. The rationale for the demand was Nayak's support for classifying Panas as Kui tribals, a move that the KSCC opposed.

In October 2008, Nayak was accused by local Hindu groups, including the chapters of the BJP and VHP, of being behind the murder of Swami Laksmanananda Saraswati, and police have been investigating persons close to him. Nayak is under investigation by the Orissa Police as of December 2008. Nayak has termed the allegations "defamation and maligning of my character".
