= Ranjit Nayak =

Indian banker

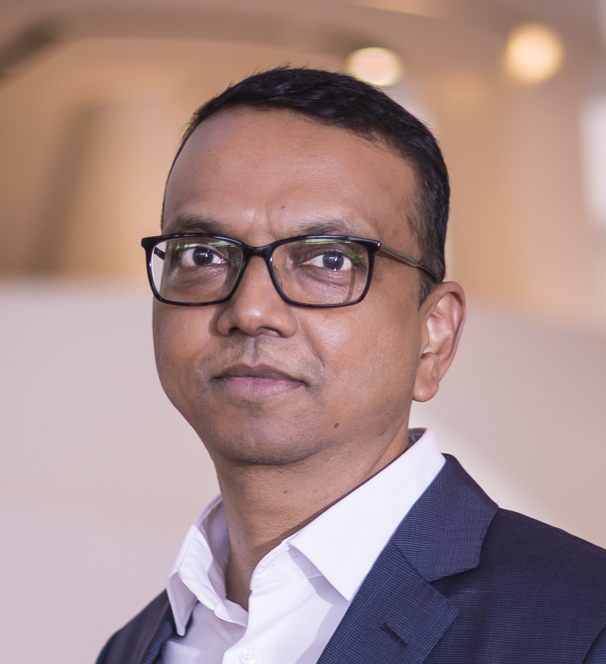
Dr. Ranjit Nayak

Ranjit Nayak (born 28 April 1968) is the Chairperson of Epsilon Investment Group based in Vienna (Austria) and Dubai (UAE). He is the founder and owner of megaOmega GmbH, a technology enterprise based in the European Union; and of MegaSPower Ltd, a global green energy firm. He also advises governments in West Asia, East Asia and Africa on investments, economic growth and development.

He is a former senior staff of the World Bank in Washington, D.C. He served as the World Bank's Principal Development Specialist for the Europe and Central Asia Region from 2011 to 2013, where he oversaw social development operations in 36 countries, advised governments and World Bank partners on development issues, and led and mentored senior sector specialists within the Bank. Nayak also served, among other assignments, as the World Bank's Country Chief for Kosovo from 2007 to 2011, and is credited with ensuring the economic and financial sustainability of Kosovo after its declaration of independence in 2008.

Following voluntary retirement from the World Bank, Nayak served as the Chief Adviser to then Government of Macedonia on European Union affairs out of Skopje and Brussels in between 2013 and 2015. In that role, he supported the Government’s efforts towards EU integration at a time when the country witnessed strong reforms and improved bilateral relations with Greece on the name "Macedonia" issue which later became North Macedonia.

== Background ==
Ranjit Nayak is born on 28 April 1968 in Sambalpur, Odisha, India. He is the son of a former member of Rajya Sabha (the Upper House of the Indian parliament) and former Permanent Secretary to the Government of India, Dr. Radhakant Nayak IAS (Indian Administrative Service).

== Education ==
Nayak attended Kendriya Vidyalaya (Central School) in Bhubaneswar, a Government of India sponsored school for the children of military and public service officials, during his early years in Odisha. He is a notable alumnus of the school. Thereafter, he was a student of Physics, Chemistry and Mathematics in BJB College (affiliated to Utkal University).

He graduated from Hindu College (University of Delhi), earning a degree in Sociology (BA Honours) and Economics in 1989. After that he completed a 2-year Master's Degree in Sociology at JNU (Jawaharlal Nehru University) in 1991 with advanced courses in Public Administration and International Relations. At JNU he researched urban poverty in the slums of New Delhi. Nayak is an eminent alum of JNU.

He continued higher studies at Cambridge University, funded by scholarships from the university and the Indian Government. These included the competitive and coveted B. R. Ambedkar National Scholarship for Social Justice. In Cambridge, he obtained two post-graduate degrees - an MPhil and a PhD - as a member of King's College, Cambridge. His MPhil involved research on development-induced displacements of minority populations in eastern India. His PhD research included more than a year of lived experience among the tribes of Odisha, Jharkhand and Chhattisgarh states, respectively. The thesis involved a better understanding of the intersection between human rights and welfare economics.

== Career ==
Prior to his work in the private and public sectors, Nayak served in the World Bank Group. He joined the Group in 2000 as a Young Professional (the Bank Group's internationally competitive leadership program) and served in various parts of the Bank Group, including the International Finance Corporation (IFC), the International Bank for Reconstruction and Development (IBRD) and the International Development Association (IDA). He voluntarily exited the World Bank Group in 2015.

Nayak's contributions in the World Bank was confined to Europe (Eastern and Southern), Asia (Central, South and East) and America (South). Among his notable contributions, was the designing and establishing of the economic architecture of Kosovo that served as the foundation of Kosovo as an independent entity. It set the stage for Kosovo's independence on 17 February 2008 and the enforcement of its constitution in June 2008. He has played an important role in facilitating the process of Kosovo's membership at the World Bank. Kosovo became the newest member of the five World Bank Group institutions on 29 June 2009, when Kosovar President Fatmir Sejdiu and Prime Minister Hashim Thaçi signed the Articles of Agreement of the International Bank for Reconstruction and Development and four other agencies of the World Bank Group.

Nayak contributed to regional development in the Western Balkans including in Serbia, Croatia, Bosnia Herzegovina, Montenegro, Albania and North Macedonia. In his World Bank tenure, he helped finance development solutions in the areas of post-conflict reconstruction, employment of best practices, strengthening of public institutions, and promotion of effective governance. Nayak helped invest development funds to developing sectors as banking, finance, energy, mining, climate change education, and transport.

Nayak was involved in the development of dialogues in high-level forums in partnership with agencies such as United States Agency for International Development, the European Commission, the International Monetary Fund, bilateral and multilateral agencies, and NATO (KFOR). He was an advocate of democratic and multiethnic institutions in areas featuring ethnic tensions. He supported positive interventions among the youth and the physically challenged in economic development. He articulated on these issues in the European lecture circuit. In an interview with the BBC, he stressed the vulnerabilities of global economic shifts and financial crises on local economies, through he remained optimistic about the future of small-sized countries.

Nayak has published in the areas of resettlement and migration, post-conflict reconstruction, informal labor market, youth, corporate social responsibility, forestry, food policy, indigenous peoples, governance, and human rights.

Prior to joining the World Bank, Nayak served as: a Consultant in the United Nations Human Rights Commission in Geneva (Switzerland); a tenured Assistant Professor in JNU in New Delhi (India); the Research Director of FIAN (Food-First Information and Action Network) in Heidelberg (Germany); a Researcher in the Institute of Development Policy and Management in Manchester (United Kingdom), among others.

=== Post-Conflict Reconstruction ===
Nayak's contribution to the stability of post-conflict areas is considered substantial. He has served in Afghanistan, Albania, Iraq, Kosovo, Nepal, Russia and Sri Lanka during periods of armed conflict. He raised $1.5 billion in donor funds towards Kosovo's first budget as an independent state in 2008.

=== Anti-Poverty ===
While serving in local, national and international NGOs, and later in the World Bank, Nayak worked on addressing issues surrounding poverty in South Asia, South America, and South Eastern Europe with the IMF (International Monetary Fund), EC (European Commission) and bilateral government agencies such as DFID (Department for International Development of the UK Government) and KFW (Kreditanstalt für Wiederaufbau, Germany). He attempted to integrate "macro" and "micro" - economic and social reform.

=== Climate Change ===
Nayak has founded a global renewable energy company that focuses on BESS (Battery Energy Storage System) and photovoltaic power stations. The company owns about 200 international patents, 1.8 Gigawatts of solar power and 1.5 Gigawatt hours of BESS. These results are based on company operations since 2019. In parallel, Nayak discusses policy issues in various forums relating to climate change adaptation and its mitigation.

=== Good Governance ===
Nayak has worked on systemic corruption and unjustified public expenditures in government institutions that hinders economic growth and keeps citizens in poverty. In an investigative report in Foreign Policy in 2010, Nayak is alleged to have positioned himself against the interests of a corrupt government as the World Bank Representative. The alleged corruption scandal was on a major East European highway. The report indicated the absence of a commitment to good governance by the Government and the private construction companies that were involved in the project.

=== Knowledge and Innovation ===
Nayak is recognised for his contribution to knowledge and innovation through citations. In one of his public speeches on education, he argued that education policies should promote overall learning for young learners that goes beyond classroom-based learning integrating it with learning from peers, family, community, a variety of institutions, and the social space . Nayak has led research on guiding South European countries to improving the environment for fostering cutting edge innovations. A World Bank paper published in 2011 on Regional Research and Design Strategy for Innovation in the Western Balkan Countries, which Nayak has guided, identifies key issues and implication of technical assistance.

=== Informal Exploitative Labour ===
Nayak has published on exploitative informal labour, particularly on harmful child labour, for the International Finance Corporation. Nayak discusses the implication of such labour in the private sector and how private companies can detect it in their supply chains and address it towards sound labour practices. This is considered good practice for private firms.

=== Forced Resettlement ===
Nayak has researched and published on refugees and displaced populations and ecological habitats. His proposition is that the forced dislocation of human, animal and plant ecosystems due to the execution and establishment of large infrastructure projects cannot easily offset: the loss of livelihoods, destruction of living ecosystems, and adverse mental and physical traumas. Hence, these projects must be thought out from all dimensions including ethical ones.

=== Development with Diversity and Inclusion ===
During his career in Southeastern Europe, Nayak campaigned for the inclusion of minorities of all types – economic, social, ethnic, religious, linguistic, and gender, in development projects. An example of his initiative was in 2011 in the Western Balkans, when he found an innovative way of working against the discrimination of minority Serb communities by the majority Albanian communities by incentivising micro-development programs that enabled both communities to work together for shared financial and economic gains. In the long run this has fostered peace that has been sustainable.

Nayak is an advocate for the inclusion of economically, socially and politically disadvantaged minorities in the broader development and welfare schemes. He is the co-author of a report on the Roma in Bulgaria entitled "Gender Dimensions of Roma Inclusion" that serves to guide national policy on social inclusion in Bulgaria. The study reveals the complex relationship between minorities and majorities within the European Union, and how the understanding the internal worlds of minorities and discriminated groups is a first step towards effective policies and programmes.

He is the recipient of the World Bank's Corporate Diversity and Inclusion Award in 2006 after he led the recruitment of the Bank's most diverse Young Professionals ever in its history since 1961. Nayak devised innovative ways to identifying talent globally. Here is an example of his work in Sydney, Australia.

=== Alternative Future ===
Nayak is an exponent for a value-oriented global arrangement that focuses on economic growth, quality of life, and environmental sustainability, while incorporating values that underline morality, ethical economics and adverse climate mitigation. His position is captured in an invited talk on "The Economy of Tomorrow" organised by FES (Friedrich Ebert Stiftung in Germany) and NISWASS (National Institute of Social Work and Social Sciences in India). Nayak argues that the sharing of good, ethical, moral and humane values should be an intrinsic part of our socialisation and learning across formal and informal institutions. This would help us shape a better human future.

== Achievements and awards ==
Ranjit Nayak has received awards and citations from development institutions, the academia and the military, including NATO (The KFOR General's Medal). Nayak has been the recipient of awards for his peace-building efforts in Russia, Afghanistan and Southeast Europe. He has published and spoken extensively in the fields of poverty, labor, infrastructure, finance, migration, environment, and human rights. Nayak's media engagements have included the BBC, Voice of America, the Financial Times and the Washington Post.
