= Nakul Nayak =

Indian politician

Member of Parliament, Lok Sabha
- In office 1989–1991
- Preceded by: Radha Kanta Digal,
- Succeeded by: Mrutyunjaya Nayak
- Constituency: Phulbani, Odisha

Personal details
- Born: 9 March 1963 (age 63) Dhudusi, Phulbani district, Odisha
- Party: Janata Dal

Nakul Nayak is an Indian politician. He was elected to the Lok Sabha, the lower house of the Parliament of India as a member of the Janata Dal.
