= Sugrib Singh =

Indian politician (1963–2021)

Member of the India Parliament for Phulbani
- Constituency: Phulbani

Personal details
- Born: 1 August 1963 Phulbani, Orissa
- Died: 26 April 2021 (aged 57) Bhubaneswar, Odisha
- Party: BJD
- Spouse: Prakasini Singh
- Children: 2 sons and 1 daughter
- As of 22 September, 2006

Sugrib Singh (1 August 1963 – 26 April 2021) was an Indian politician.

== Biography ==
He represented the Phulbani constituency of Orissa from 2004 to 2009 and was a member of the Biju Janata Dal (BJD) political party.

Singh died from COVID-19 on 26 April 2021.
