= Mrutyunjaya Nayak =

Indian educationalist, social worker and politician

Member of the Lok Sabha for Phulbani
- In office 1991 – 1998
- Prime Minister: Atal Bihari Vajpayee; Pamulaparthi Venkata Narasimha Rao
- Preceded by: Nakul Nayak
- Succeeded by: Padmanava Behara
- In office 1980 – 1984
- Prime Minister: Indira Gandhi
- Preceded by: Sribatcha Digal
- Succeeded by: Radha Kanta Digal

Personal details
- Born: 1 July 1952 (age 74) Phulbani, Odisha, India
- Party: Indian National Congress
- Spouse: Supriti Mohanty
- Children: 2
- Education: Kholikote College
- Occupation: Social Reformer, Politician and Educationist

Mrutyunjaya Nayak (born 1 July 1952 in Phulbani, Odisha ) was an educationist, social worker and politician from Odisha. He was a social reformer and was an advocate of female literacy. He had founded many institution for promoting higher education in Kandhamal and Bolangir district. He founded Sanjay Memorial Government Women's college which is a milestone in promoting female higher education in the tribal dominated district. He was the founder of CITRAP ( Council for Integrated Tribal Research Awareness Programme) which have provided free computer education DOEACC O level courses to around 500 SC, ST and OBC women. Most of them are now working professionals. He served as member of the Lok Sabha representing Phulbani (Lok Sabha constituency). He was elected to 7th, 10th and 11th Lok Sabha

Mrutyunjaya Nayak has also served in Constitutional position as a member of National Commission for Scheduled Castes. from 2006 to 2009. He had written many articles published in leading newspapers and had also written a book named 'Hitler and Democracy'.

He died on 18 February 2025 due to Cardiac arrest in AIIMS, Bhubaneswar.

== Personal life ==
Nayak was educated at Kholikote College. He was married to Supriti Mohanty and has two Sons, Dr Sanjay Gautam Nayak and Vikram Anupam Nayak. In addition to his other work, Nayak has published two books.
