= Diocese of Agra (Church of North India) =

Diocese of Agra is an Anglican diocese in the Church of North India. Diocese of Agra, within the Church of North India, was constituted by the decision of the Synod Executive of the Church of North India. The new Diocese thus formed comprising the western part of Uttar Pradesh was named the Diocese of Agra. The Diocese's constitution was accepted and adopted by Minutes 76/6 at the first ordinary meeting of the Diocesan Council of the Diocese of Agra which held its session in St. John's College, Agra Hall, on 9 April 1976.

The current bishop is Bijay Kumar Nayak.

== The Constitution ==
The Constitution of the Diocese of Agra was accepted and adopted by minutes 76/6 at the first ordinary meeting of the Diocesan Council of the Diocese of Agra which held its sessions in St. John's College, Agra on 9 April 1976 and as subsequently amended up to the Sixteenth Diocesan Council held on 2–5 October 2006 at St. Paul's College, Agra.

=== Preamble ===
As authorized by the Constitution and the Church of North India, the Agra Diocesan Council adopted its Constitution for the Pastorates, keeping in view the condition and needs of Pastorates in the Diocese, and the same was approved by the Church of North India Synod Executive Committee.

=== The Pastorate ===
A Pastorate is an organized congregation or a group of Congregations, recognized as a Pastorate by the Diocesan Council, under the Pastoral care of the Presbyter-in-charge. In some pastorates other ministers may be appointed to assist the presbyter-in-charge of the pastorate and to work under his/her supervision. The pastorate comprises the below mentioned

- The Presbyter-in-charge,
- Associate/Assistant Pastors and Deacons, if any, in the active service of the Church,
- The President or Secretary of the Pastorate W.F.C.S,
- The president or Secretary of the Pastorate Youth Fellowship,
- The Secretary/Superintendent of the Sunday School in the Pastorate shall be ex-officio member of the Pastorate Committee.
- Lay members to be elected on the Pastoral Committee by the Pastorate according to the following proportions:

== Education ==
The Diocese looks after the Schools and Education via the Diocesan Education Board, a Non-Profit organization with the objective to serve the Country through sound education based on Christian principles. The Diocesan Education Board is registered under Act No XXI/1860 of the Societies Act, Uttar Pradesh by Registrar of Societies, U.P Lucknow.

Under the supervision of the Bishop the Diocese serves in Agra, Aligarh, Mathura, Meerut, Kanpur, Ghaziabad, Etah, Kasganj, Bareilly, Bulandshahar, Farukhabad, Moradabad, Sambhal, Mainpuri, Dehradun, Saharanpur, Mussoorie, Nainital and in all about forty such places in the western Uttar Pradesh and Uttarakhand Region. The Schools and Colleges are

- St. John's College, Agra
- St. George's College, Agra, Agra
- St. Paul's College, Agra, Church Road, Civil Lines, Agra
- St. Paul’s Church College Unit-II, M.G. Road, Agra
- St. Paul’s Church College Unit-II, Sikandra Campus, Sikandra, Agra
- Queen Victoria Girls Inter College, Hariparwat, Agra
- Queen Victoria Nursery School, Delhi Gate, Agra
- Queen Victoria English Medium School, Delhi Gate, Agra
- Queen Victoria Primary School, Delhi Gate, Agra
- SWM Higher Secondary School, Sikandra, Agra
- St. John’s Girls Inter College, Agra
- St. John’s Girls Primary School, M.G. Road, Agra
- St. John’s Boys Inter College, Hospital Road, Agra
- Diocesan Junior High School, Eng. Medium,
- St. John’s Church Compound, Hospital Road, Agra
- Christian Inter College, Mainpuri
- Christian KG & Primary School, Mainpuri
- Christian Agriculture Inter College, Etah
- Prentiss Girls Inter College, Etah
- St. John’s Church School, Etah
- CNI Girls Inter College, 51-Rajpur Road, Dehradun
- CNI Boys Inter College, Palton Bazar, Dehradun
- Ferger Junior High School/Ferger Primary School, 51-Rajpur Road, Dehradun
- St. John’s Primary School, 6-Kutchery Road. Dehradun
- St. James Junior Highs School, Vikasnagar, Dehradun
- Christ Church College, Kanpur
- Christ Church Inter College, Kanpur
- Epiphany Girls Junior High School, 14/137, Civil Lines, Kanpur
- Bishop Westcott School, 16/104, Civil Lines, Kanpur
- Rakha Girls inter College, Fatehgarh
- Christian Inter College, Farrukhabad
- City Girls Inter College, Farrukhabd
- St. John’s Senior Secondary School, 117-Bank Street, Meerut Cantt
- St. Thomas English Medium School, Jyoti Niketan, Chhipi Tank, Meerut
- St. Thomas Girls’ Inter College, Meerut
- St. Andrew’s Girls Junior High School, P.O. Jeyi, Meerut
- St. Thomas Junior High School, Meerut
- All Saints School, C/O St. Thomas Church Compound, Nili Kothi, Meerut
- Holy Trinity Church School, Railway Station Road, Ghaziabad
- St. Paul’s College, Moradabad
- St. Perpetua’s Girls Junior High School, Pakbara, Moradabad
- St. Andrew’s Boys Junior High School, Ummedpur, Moradabad
- All Saints English Medium School, Delhi Road, Bulandshahr
- Maishi Kanya Vidyalaya, Bulandshar
- All Saints College, Nainital
- Sherwood College, Nainital
