= Diocese of Yangon =

anglican
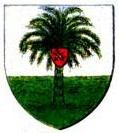

Location
- Ecclesiastical province: Calcutta (1877–1930)
- Archdeaconries: Rangoon, Mandalay, Toungoo, Delta, Moulmein

Statistics
- Members: 100,000+

Information
- First holder: Jonathan Holt Titcomb
- Cathedral: Holy Trinity Cathedral, Yangon

Current leadership
- Bishop: Stephen Than Myint Oo, Archbishop of Myanmar and Bishop of Yangon

Website
- yangon.anglicanmyanmar.org

The Diocese of Yangon (formerly Rangoon) is the Church of the Province of Myanmar (Anglican) jurisdiction in and around the old capital Yangon, and under the care of the Bishop of Yangon and Archbishop of Myanmar. The diocese (then called Rangoon) was in the Church of England province of Calcutta from 1877 to 1930, then the Church of India, Pakistan, Burma and Ceylon until 1970. Beforehand, British Burma, had come under the guidance of the Bishop of Calcutta, Metropolitan of India. In 1966, the last non-Burmese bishop was evicted by the Burmese authorities and in 1970 the Diocese of Rangoon became the Church of the Province of Burma, and the bishop was elevated to Archbishop in that church.

== Title ==
He was officially styled The Right Reverend Father in God, (Name), by Divine Providence Lord Bishop of Rangoon, but this full title was rarely used, the majority of the time the bishop being addressed either as Bishop or Lord Bishop of Rangoon. In signing his name, the bishop's surname would be replaced by the name of his diocese. Therefore, J.O.E. Bloggs would become J.O.E. Rangoon in official correspondence.

== Pay and residence ==
In 1884 the pay of the Bishop was the not insubstantial salary of £960 per annum. The official residence of the Bishop was throughout the existence of the diocese Bishop's Court in Rangoon.

== History ==
=== 19th century ===
The area today known as Myanmar was in 1877 part of the British Indian Empire, and known as Burma. It was decided that the area of Southern Burma required a more substantial ecclesiastical presence than the Bishop of Calcutta could provide. For decades the American baptist, Society for the Propagation of the Gospel (SPG) and Society for Promoting Christian Knowledge (SPCK) missionaries had been making inroads among the Burmese and Karenni peoples. In recognition of this, the Diocese of Winchester created an Endowment Fund for the establishment of a bishopric in Burma; the diocese itself contributed £10,000. The SPG, SPCK. and the Colonial Bishoprics' Fund together contributed £10,000 to the creation of the diocese. Therefore in 1877 the diocese of Rangoon, subject to the diocese of Calcutta was established by Letters Patent. Jonathan Holt Titcomb, a parish priest in Winchester diocese, was elected the first Bishop of Rangoon and so appointed on 17 December 1877.

=== Early 20th century ===
At first the diocese encompassed only the southern half of Burma, but was later extended to cover the whole of the country. The Bishop was formerly appointed by the monarch on the advice of the Secretary of State for India. However, in 1927 in response to growing agitation on the part of the bishops in India the British Parliament passed legislation to bring to an end the Church of England's jurisdiction over the church in India. Consequently, the Diocese of Rangoon became a major part of the new, autonomous Church of India, Burma and Ceylon. Covering the entirety of Burma, the diocese was in effect the Church of Burma. In Burma, the Bishop was permitted to title himself as head of the Church of Burma.

=== Late 20th century ===
The Bishop continued to assume his duties in Burma after the independence of that country in 1948. There were eight Bishops of Rangoon before the Church of Burma became autocephalous. However, in 1966 the Burmese government forced all Western missionaries to leave, including the then-bishop V.G. Shearburn. His assistant bishop, Francis Ah Mya was appointed Bishop in his place. In 1970, the Church of Burma, hitherto part of the Church of India, Pakistan, Burma and Ceylon (the then-current incarnation of the 1927 creation) became the Anglican Church of the Province of Burma (later of Myanmar), and the See of Rangoon was permanently attached to (and held ex officio with) the elected Primatial and Metropolitan archepiscopal See.

Rangoon became an autonomous province independent of the Province of India, Pakistan, Burma and Cylone, with Ah Mya as its first archbishop;

== Bishops ==
Bishops of Rangoon

- 1877–1882: Jonathan Titcomb
- 1882–1903: John Strachan
- 1903–1909: Arthur Knight
- 1910–1928: Rolleston Fyffe
- 1928–1934: Norman Tubbs
- 1935–1954: George West
  - 1941 (appointed): A. T. (Alfred Thomas) "Tim" Houghton, assistant bishop-designate
- 1955–1966: Victor Shearburn
  - 1949–1966: Francis Ah Mya, assistant bishop
  - 1949–1973: John Aung Hla, assistant bishop
- 28 August 1966 – 1970: Francis Ah Mya

Bishops of Rangoon and Archbishops of Burma

- 1970–1973: Francis Ah Mya
- 1973–1979: John Aung Hla
- 6 October 1979 – 1987: Gregory Hla Kyaw
- 1988–1989: Andrew Mya Han
  - 1988–1993: Samuel San Si Htay, assistant bishop

Bishops of Yangon and Archbishops of Myanmar

- 1989–2001: Andrew Mya Han
  - 1993 – after 2007: Joseph Than Pe, assistant bishop
- 2001–2008: Samuel San Si Htay
- 2008–present: Stephen Than Myint Oo
