= List of cathedrals in Myanmar =

This is a list of cathedrals in Burma sorted by denomination.

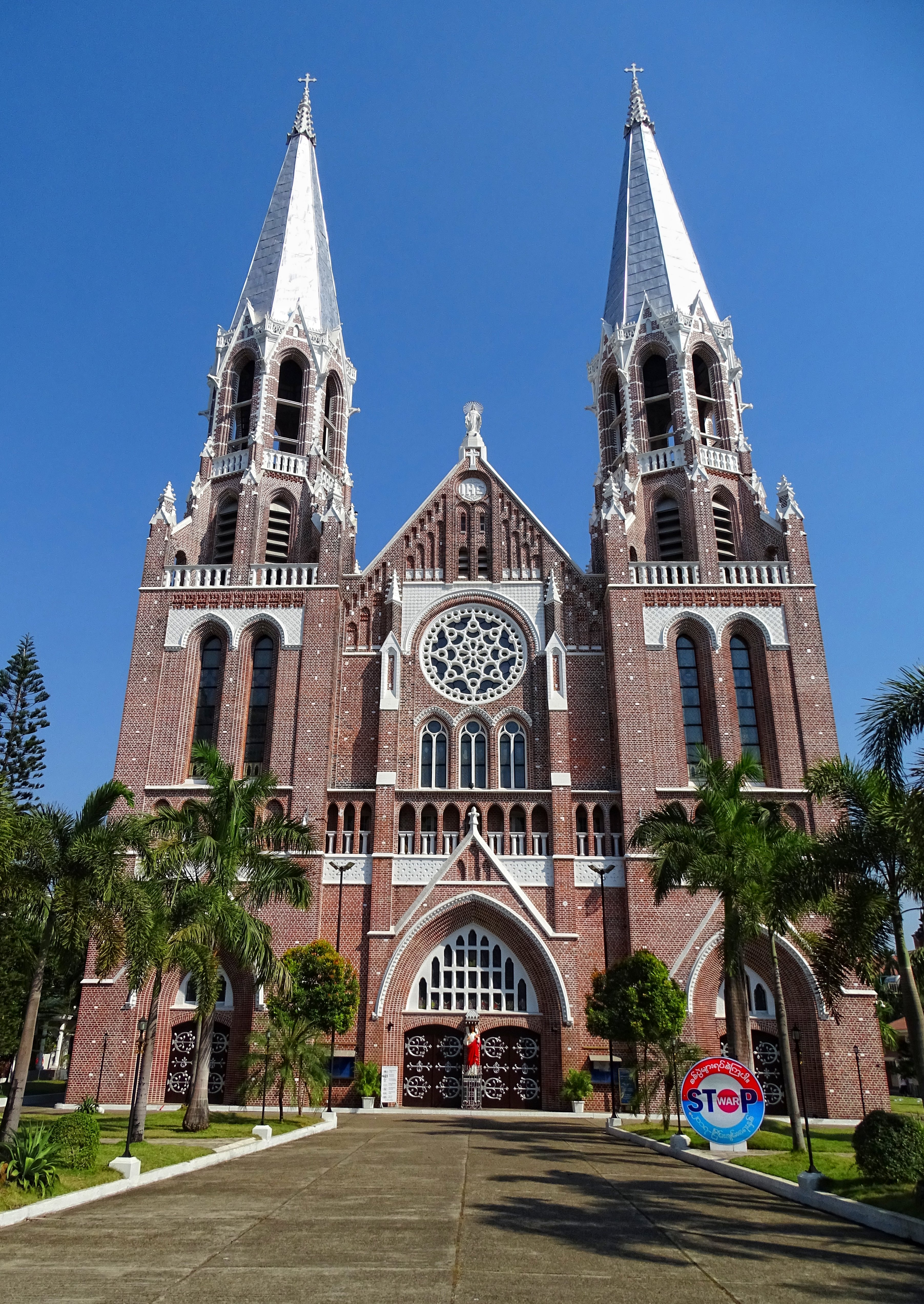
Cathedral of the Immaculate Conception in Yangon

== Catholic ==
Cathedrals of the Catholic Church in Burma:

- Cathedral of St. Patrick in Banmaw
- Cathedral of St. Joseph in Hakha
- Cathedral of St. Francis Xavier in Hpa-an
- Cathedral of St. Mary in Kalay
- Cathedral of the Immaculate Heart of Mary in Kengtung
- Cathedral of the Sacred Heart in Lashio
- Christ the King Cathedral in Loikaw
- Sacred Heart Cathedral in Mandalay
- Holy Family Cathedral in Mawlamyine
- St. Columban's Cathedral in Myitkyina
- St. Peter's Cathedral in Pathein
- Cathedral of the Sacred Heart of Jesus in Pekon
- St. Paul's Cathedral in Pyay
- St. Joseph's Cathedral in Taunggyi
- Cathedral of the Sacred Heart in Taungoo
- Cathedral of the Immaculate Conception in Yangon

== Anglican ==
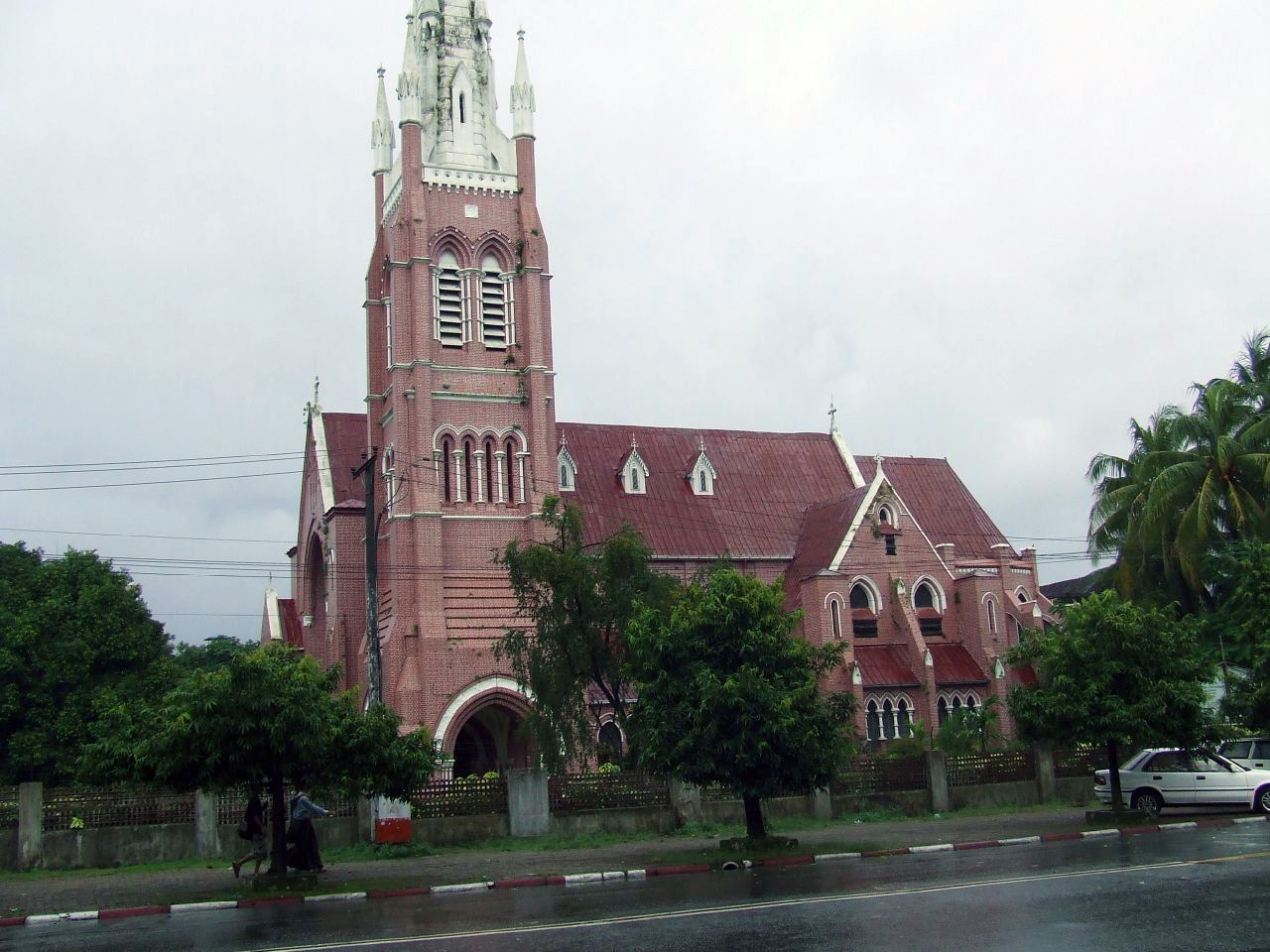
Holy Trinity Cathedral, Yangon

Cathedrals of the Church of the Province of Myanmar:

- St. Peter's Cathedral in Hpa-An
- Christ Church Cathedral in Mandalay
- Holy Trinity Cathedral in Yangon
- Christ the King Cathedral in Myitkyina Diocese
- St. Mark Cathedral in Sittwe Diocese

== See also ==
- List of cathedrals
- Christianity in Burma
