= Thomas Welbank Fowle =

Thomas Welbank Fowle (29 August 1835 – 14 January 1903) was an English cleric and writer, known as a social reformer.

== Life ==
Born at Northallerton in Yorkshire, on 29 August 1835, Thomas Welbank Fowle was the son of Thomas Fowle, a solicitor, and Mary Welbank his wife, both of Northallerton. After education at Durham School (1848–53) and at Charterhouse, he entered Exeter College, Oxford, in 1854; after a term's stay there he gained an open scholarship at Oriel College, graduating with a B.A. in 1858 (M.A. 1861). As an undergraduate he was President of the Oxford Union in 1858. He associated with Thomas Hill Green and Albert Venn Dicey, and shared their political sympathies.

Fowle took holy orders in 1859, becoming curate of Staines in Middlesex. In 1863 he was appointed vicar of Holy Trinity, Hoxton, a poor parish in East London with a large population. New schools were built, managed by a committee of churchmen and nonconformists, which innovated with a conscience clause. In 1868 he became vicar of St. Luke's, Nutford Place, in Marylebone.

In 1875 Fowle was presented to the rectory of Islip, Oxfordshire. He ran there an allotment system for agricultural labourers, and as a poor-law guardian worked to reduce outdoor relief.

Fowle's only son, by his second wife, died in 1895, and his health became poor. In 1901 he retired from Islip to Oxford, where he died on 14 January 1903. He was buried at Islip, by the side of his son.

== Views ==
Fowle contributed an essay entitled "The Church and the Working Classes" to Essays on Church Policy (1868), a collection of Broad Church views edited by Walter Lowe Clay, and arguing that the working class was alienated from the Church of England. He tried to reconcile recent scientific discoveries with religious belief in three articles on Evolution in the Nineteenth Century (July 1878, March 1879, September 1881), as well as in the New Analogy, which he published in 1881 under the pseudonym "Cellarius".

On social issues, Fowle contributed an article in the Fortnightly Review for June 1880 advocating the abolition of outdoor relief and a manual, The Poor Law, in the "English Citizen" series (1881; second edition 1890), which became a standard work. In 1892 he advocated for old age pensions in a pamphlet The Poor Law, the Friendly Societies, and Old Age Destitution – a Proposed Solution (new edition 1895).

Fowle supported the Representation of the People Act 1884 as extending the franchise to the agricultural labourer. He opposed the Government of Ireland Bill 1886, and for the next ten years was prominent as Liberal Unionist. He was an influential advocate of the Local Government Act 1894 which created parish councils and district councils.

== Works ==
Fowle published also religious works:

- Types of Christ in Nature: Sermons preached at Staines, 1864.
- The Reconciliation of Religion and Science, 1873.
- An Essay on the Right Translation of αἰών and αἰώνιος, regarded as exhibiting the Silence of the New Testament as to the Conditions of the Future Life, 1877.
- The Divine Legation of Christ, 1879.

== Family ==
Fowle was twice married:

1. in 1861, to Sarah Susannah (d. 1874), daughter of Richard Atkinson, medical practitioner at Richmond, Yorkshire, by whom Fowle had seven daughters;
2. in 1876, to Mabel Jane, daughter of Jacob Isaacs, a West Indian merchant; she survived Fowle with a daughter.

== Notes ==
Attribution

This article incorporates text from a publication now in the public domain: Lee, Sidney, ed. (1912). "Fowle, Thomas Welbank". Dictionary of National Biography (2nd supplement). Vol. 2. London: Smith, Elder & Co.
