= George West (bishop) =

British Anglican missionary

The Rt. Rev. George Algernon West
- Lord Bishop of Rangoon
- Church: Church of England
- See: Rangoon
- In office: 1935–1954
- Predecessor: Norman Henry Tubbs
- Successor: Victor George Shearburn

Orders
- Ordination: 1920
- Consecration: 27 January 1935

Personal details
- Born: 17 December 1893; County Durham
- Died: 25 May 1980

George Algernon West, MM (17 December 1893 – 25 May 1980) was a British Anglican missionary who spent many years in Burma, first as a missionary for the Society for Propagation of the Gospel and then as the Lord Bishop of Rangoon. In the latter position he served for nineteen years, and gradually became active involved with the Moral Re-Armament movement. After retiring from Burma in 1954 he became Assistant Bishop of Durham.

== Early life and career ==
George Algernon West was born on 17 December 1893, the son of the Reverend George West and Marion West. His father, also named George Algernon, despite being a staunch supporter of Keir Hardie and of his Labour Party, sent the young George to St. Bees Grammar School in Cumberland, the only public school in Cumberland and Westmorland. There from 1907 to 1913, West "gained high repute" as a batsman, and played cricket and football for the county side. He was part of the 1911–1912 XV which played eleven, won ten and lost only one match. Also in that team was John L.I. Hawkesworth, who later became a corps commander in Eighth Army during the Second World War. Out of the twelve men who comprised the 1908 Cricket XI, seven would later give their lives in World War I. After finishing at St. Bees he went to Lincoln College, Oxford as a history exhibitioner, where he studied until the outbreak of the First World War. Interrupting his studies, he joined Sir Ralph Paget's Red Cross relief unit in Serbia, and was present when the Serbian Army was forced to retreat into Albania.

Afterwards he returned home to Britain and joined the Royal Garrison Artillery (the British Army's heavy guns). Promoted from Bombardier to Corporal, in 1918 he was awarded the Military Medal for service in France. Towards the end of the war, West was sent back to England to take an Officer's Training Course. He was commissioned, but the Armistice came into force before he could return to the front. Having been demobilised, he returned to Oxford to continue his studies, and decided to read for Orders in 1919. During Advent the following year he was ordained as a Priest of the Church of England on 19 December by the Bishop of Durham, Hensley Henson.

In 1921 West went to Burma, then part of the British Empire, to join the Society for the Propagation of the Gospel in Foreign Parts (SPG) at its St. Peter's Mission at Toungoo in the south. He spent five years with the Karen people on the Upper Salween River. His experiences in Burma redefined the rôle of missionaries, and made him a popular figure with the Karenni. His work became known through his publication of a quarterly newsletter, Mountain Men, and later through his writing of three books on the Karenni; Jungle Folk (1933), Jungle Friends (1937) and Jungle Witnesses (1948). The work he did in Burma, latterly at Kappali, recommended him to the position of Bishop of Rangoon. On 5 April 1923 he married Helen Margaret Scott-Moncrieff, the daughter of a senior army officer. Unfortunately, two years later she died.

== Bishop of Rangoon ==
On 4 December 1934 the Right Reverend Norman Henry Tubbs received news that he was to be superseded by West as Bishop of Rangoon. He was elected Bishop of Rangoon after the Church of England in India had been given autonomy, and was now the Church of India, Burma and Ceylon, and was therefore answerable to the Metropolitan Bishop of Calcutta who was technically the head of the Church of Burma. While Bishop he travelled all over his diocese, as he had while a missionary, and continued to pay especial attention to the affairs of the Karenni.

Upon reaching Rangoon to assume the bishopric, he wrote;

"Bishop's Court [the official residence] must be a heartbeat for the whole nation, a place for British and Burman, Indian and Karens to meet and find a common mind on an entirely new level of unselfish statesmanship where the spirit of God might touch and heal the bleeding wounds of Burma."

He continued to voyage back and forth to England, being particularly involved with the Rangoon Diocesan Association. Seemingly unaffected by the outbreak of the Second World War, while travelling on 9 June 1941 West was involved in a serious motor car accident which left him unconscious for three weeks. Having recovered, he left for India to recuperate and was therefore absent when the Japanese declared war and invaded Burma.

With his Diocese overrun by the Imperial Japanese Army, West went to the United States. There, he became a leading member of the Oxford Group, a movement devoted to an "ideology of democracy", which later became the Moral Re-Armament (MRA) movement. For a two-month period in 1942 West became the Bishop of the Episcopal Diocese of Atlanta. While in America he wrote a book called The World that Works (1944) devoted to the MRA ideals. While in the United States, he married Grace Hay in Tryon, North Carolina in April 1943. Soon after, fully recovered from his injuries, he returned to India to do what he could. With the eventual defeat of the Japanese in Burma, West was one of the first British civilian allowed back into the country, flying into Rangoon on 9 July 1945 to find the city in a parlous state and discovered that his Cathedral, St. Paul's, had been fitted out as a distillery by the Japanese occupiers.

== After the war ==
West devoted his energy to help rebuild his diocese. While working with the MRA he had come into contact with several Buddhists who would assist his understanding of dealing with them in Burma, helping to lower barriers which existed between them and Christians. Under his leadership the hosts of churches which had been destroyed or damaged were rebuilt or repaired. In June 1948 he underwent an operation for throat cancer which affected his speaking. While recovering Karenni separatists marched on Rangoon, reaching a point only nine miles away from the city in January 1949. It was partly thanks to the efforts of West, whom the Karenni respected and admired, that after a siege of one hundred and twelve days the Karen withdrew. West resigned the bishopric of Rangoon in 1949 but later withdrew his resignation, and returned to Britain in time for that year's annual meeting of the Rangoon Diocesan Association.

He continued in his position as Bishop of Rangoon for another five years, commuting between England and Burma, attending to the needs of the Burmese under his care and also tended to the many services of remembrance to remember the men of XIV Army in the Burma campaign. In 1954 he resigned as Bishop, and had no active rôle with the church until 1965, when he became for three years the Assistant Bishop of Durham. Having finally retired at the age of 74, he retired to Durham, where he died on 25 May 1980

A brother, Lieutenant-Colonel Maurice Lethbridge West, was killed on 8 June 1944 while commanding the 1/8th Battalion of the Lancashire Fusiliers at the Battle of Kohima.

== Published works ==
- West, G.A. (1933). Jungle Folk. The Society for the Propagation of the Gospel in Foreign Parts.
- West, G.A. (1937). Jungle Friends. The Society for the Propagation of the Gospel in Foreign Parts.
- West, G.A. (1948). Jungle Witnesses. The Society for the Propagation of the Gospel in Foreign Parts.

== Citations ==
Religious titles
Preceded by Norman Henry Tubbs	Lord Bishop of Rangoon; 1935–1954	Succeeded by V.G. Shearburn
