= Jonathan Titcomb =

English clergyman

Jonathan Holt Titcomb (29 July 1819 – 2 April 1887) was an English clergyman and the first Anglican bishop of Rangoon.

== Education ==
Jonathan Holt Titcomb was born in London on 29 July 1819, and educated at Brompton in 1826, and at Clapham from 1827 to 1830. In 1831, he moved to King's College School, from where he went in 1834 to Thomas Jarrett to be prepared for university. He entered Peterhouse, Cambridge, in 1837, read for mathematical honours, and at the end of his first year gained a college scholarship. He graduated BA (junior optime) in 1841, and MA in 1845, and was created D.D. honoris causa in 1877.

== Career ==
=== Curate and vicar ===
In 1842 he took up residence in the house of Lady Harriet Forde of Hollymount, near Downpatrick, Ireland, (the widow of Mathew Forde) as tutor to her nephew, Pierce Butler. He was ordained on 25 September 1842, and acted as curate at Downpatrick. In February 1844, he became curate of St Mark's Church, Kennington, London, and in April 1845 perpetual curate of St. Andrew-the-Less, a large parish in Cambridge where a portion of the population were of the most disreputable and degraded character. He married, in May 1845, Sarah Holt, eldest daughter of John Wood of Southport. They had two sons and eight daughters, four of whom died in the bishop's lifetime.

Titcomb very soon made himself popular, and had large congregations attending his church; he instituted Sunday schools and district visitors, and became a very successful open-air preacher. He resigned his living in June 1859, and moved to South Kensington, London. For nearly three years he acted as secretary to the Christian Vernacular Education Society for India.

In April 1861, Titcomb was presented to the vicarage of St. Stephen's, South Lambeth, where a new district church had been erected. From 1870 to 1876 he acted as rural dean of Clapham, Surrey, and in 1874 was made an honorary canon of Winchester Cathedral. His London engagements were also numerous: he was a member of the Eclectic Society and of the Prophetical Society, where he read papers; he lectured at the Christian Evidence Society, and argued with atheists at Bradlaugh's Hall of Science.

His wife died on 25 January 1876, aged 52. The Earl of Onslow, who had witnessed the success of his ministry in South Lambeth, gave him the living of Woking, Surrey, in March 1876. In the following year he was appointed the first bishop of the newly formed diocese of Rangoon (now Yangon) in British Burma, and consecrated in Westminster Abbey on 21 December 1877.

=== Bishop of Rangoon ===
He landed in Rangoon on 21 February 1878, and during his short career in the country led an active life. He held a confirmation in the Andaman Islands, consecrated a missionary church at Toungoo, ordained to the diaconate Tamil and Karen converts, paid seven visits to Moulmein resulting in the appointment of a chaplain there, and baptised and confirmed numerous Tamils, Karens, Burmese, Chinese, Eurasians and Telugus.

On 17 February 1881 he fell over a cliff in the Karen hills, and was so injured that he was ultimately obliged to return to England, where, on 3 March 1882, he resigned his bishopric. An account of some portion of his career as a bishop is given in his autobiography Personal Recollections of British Burma, and its Church Mission Work in 1878–9 (London, 1880).

He was succeeded in his post by John Strachan.

His son, William Holt Yates Titcomb, was a figurative oil painter, particularly known for his depictions of Cornish fisherfolk.

=== Later life ===
After a period of rest, Titcomb was appointed by the bishop of London his coadjutor for the supervision of the English chaplains in Northern and Central Europe, extending over ten nations (i.e. a predecessor of the European Bishops of Fulham). After eight long continental journeys (1884–1886) his strength failed, and he accepted the vicarage of St. Peter's, Brockley, Kent. He formally resigned his post as coadjutor in or before March 1886.

He died at St. Leonard's-on-Sea on 2 April 1887, aged 67, and was interred at Brompton Cemetery.

== Works ==
In addition to addresses, lectures, pastorals, and sermons, he published:

- Heads of Prayer for Daily Private Devotion, with an Appendix of Occasional Prayers. (Cambridge, 1830; 4th edit. 1862)
- Bible Studies, or an Inquiry into the Progressive Development of Divine Revelation. (Cambridge, 1851, part 1 only; ²1857)
- Baptism, its Institution, its Privileges, and its Responsibilities. (1866)
- The Real Presence: Remarks in Reply to R. F. Littledale. (1867)
- The Doctrine of the Real Presence in the Lord's Supper. (1868)
- Revelation in Progress from Adam to Malachi: Bible Studies. (1871)
- Cautions for Doubters. (1873; ²1880)
- Church Lessons for Young Churchmen, or Gladius Ecclesiæ (1873), two editions
- The Anglo-Israel Post-Bag (1876)
- Is it not Reasonable? A Dialogue on the Anglo-Israel Controversy (1877)
- Liberationist Fallacies (1877)
- Before the Cross: a Book of Devout Meditation (1878)
- The Bond of Peace: a Message to the Church (1878)
- Short Chapters on Buddhism, past and present (1883)
- A Message to the Nineteenth Century (1887), a work on Anglo-Israelism

== See also ==
- Church of the Province of Myanmar
- St. Andrew's Anglican Church, Moscow
