= William Henry Jackson (priest) =

English missionary to Burma, who was blind

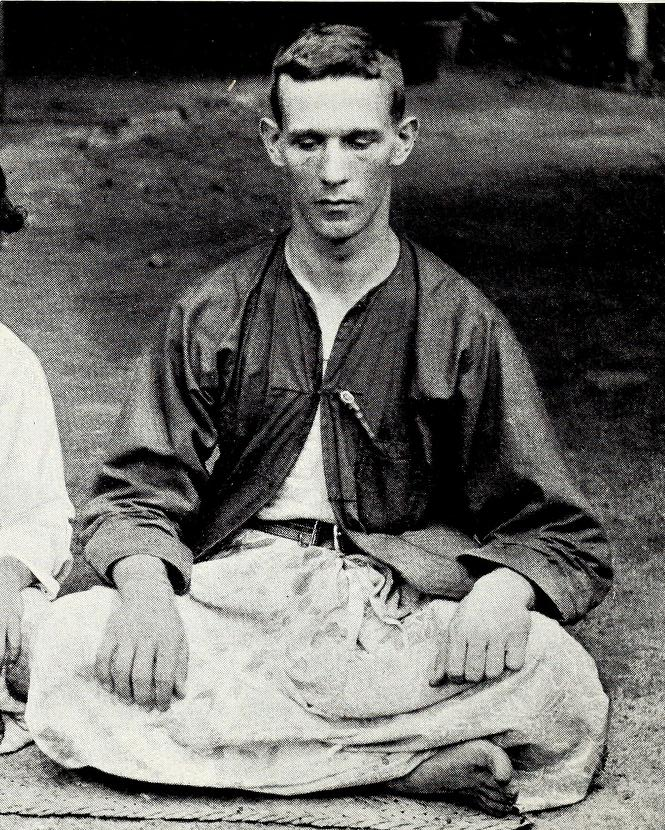
- Born: 13 March 1889
- Died: 6 December 1931 (aged 42)
- Other names: Apay-gyi
- Alma mater: Royal National College for the Blind; Wadham College; Leeds Clergy School
- Occupation: Missionary, teacher, Anglican priest, poet, pianist, composer, choir director
- Parent(s): Richard Jackson
- Relatives: Mary Chesmer Purser
- Awards: Kaisar-i-Hind Medal, first class (1930 New Year Honours, 1930)

The Reverend Father William Henry Jackson (1889–1931) was an Anglican priest from England, who served as a missionary and ran the Kemmendine Blind School in Rangoon, Burma (now Yangon, Myanmar), for whose choir he also composed, conducted and recorded choral music. Blind from the age of two, he was the inventor of Burmese Braille. He received the Kaisar-i-Hind Medal, first class, and two books were written about him after his death.

== Early life ==
Jackson was born on 13 March 1889, at Tudor House, Greenwich, England. Known as "Willie", he was the sixth of nine children, the youngest of whom died as an infant. The family soon after moved to Stobcross Lodge, at Crooms Hill, Blackheath, where he spent his childhood. His parents were Mary Ann, née Bell, and Richard Stephens Jackson a solicitor and politician who later served as a member of the United Kingdom parliament.

When he was eighteen months old, one of his eyes had to be removed due to a growth. A year later the other was removed. In later life he had no recollection of ever having had sight. He learned to read Moon and then Braille, and was subsequently educated as a border at the Royal Normal College for the Blind, from where he matriculated in 1907. After being confirmed at the age of eighteen by the Suffragan Bishop of Croydon, Henry Pereira, he decided to enter the priesthood.

He studied at Wadham College, Oxford, where he employed a reader, as text books were not generally available in Braille. After three years he obtained a second-class degree in modern history, and in his fourth and final year, a second-class degree in theology. He then spent a year at Leeds Theological College, resulting in his ordination in 1912.

== Ministry ==
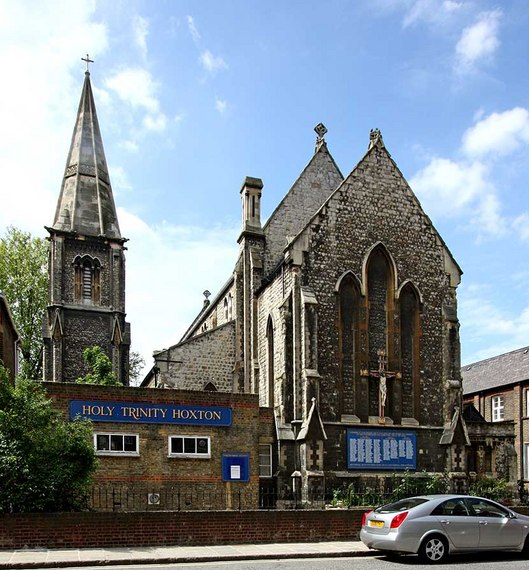
Holy Trinity Church, Hoxton seen in 2009

After ordination, Jackson obtained a position at St Clement's, Ilford, where he worked for four and a half years as a curate, assisting the new vicar, who had been vice-principal during Jackson's time at Leeds. He next spent nine months in ministry at Holy Trinity, Hoxton.

Jackson favoured high church or Anglo-Catholic tradition.

== Burma ==
William Charles Bertrand Purser, a friend of Jackson's oldest brother, had obtained a position as a missionary to St. Michael's Mission, in Rangoon, Burma (then a British colony) in 1904. In 1911, Purser and Jackson's younger sister Mary were married, and she returned with her new husband to Burma.

At Purser's suggestion, and at the request of the Lieutenant Governor of the colony, Jackson was invited to become a missionary in Rangoon, to develop and run a school for blind boys that Purser had established in 1914, in the suburb of Kemmendine (spellings vary; now Kyimyindaing), a position he took up in 1917.

Accompanied by Purser, he sailed to Burma from Liverpool, via Gibraltar and Port Said, on the SS Burma, as part of a merchant convoy, with six destroyers to reduce the risk of attack from German submarines, as World War I was still in progress. Nonetheless, two of the ships were sunk, before reaching Port Said.

During the voyage, Jackson began to learn to speak Burmese, becoming proficient within six months. He arrived on 8 November and shortly afterwards began to follow local customs, such as wearing the clothes of lower-class Burmese people, walking about barefoot and bare-headed, and eating food with his fingers.

Using his existing knowledge of Braille, he developed a similar system of encoding the Burmese language using raised symbols, as Burmese Braille, initially embossed onto sheets of metal from old petrol tins. He also adapted an old mangle as a Braille printing press. Although the system was subsequently expanded, his original ideas are still part of it.

He set about designing a new school building, adapted to the needs of its blind occupants. This was completed in July 1919. As the school catered almost exclusively for boys (it had only one female pupil), Jackson assisted in the creation and running of an equivalent institution for girls, St Raphael's School at Moulmein (now Mawlamyine), some hundred miles away, which he would visit for a few days each month. In July 1920, he visited Mandalay and was influential in the creation of a school for blind children there, also. He also set up a charity, the 'Mission to the Blind of Burma', to raise funds for the Kemmendine school, with fundraising occurring both in Burma and in the United Kingdom, via an agent in London.

In 1928 he hosted a delegation from the Simon Commission, who visited the school.

He composed music to be performed by pupils from the school, including original hymns in Burmese, and a Christmas Cantata performed on Christmas Eve 1930. A recital of 'Original Burmese Carols', held at Rangoon's Holy Trinity Cathedral, resulted in a commission for him and the twelve-member school choir to make records which were commercially released by Columbia Records. His distinctive method of conducting blind singers was to sing ahead of them by a fraction of a beat.

During trips home to England, he gave talks on BBC Radio about his missionary work, on 19 October 1923 and again on 5 August 1928, the latter being titled Why I live among the Burmese Blind. He followed the first broadcast with an article for The Radio Times, "Burma: The Land of Thrills".

He also contributed to an updated edition of Cook's Guide to Burma for Thomas Cook & Son, and persuaded the publishers of Punch to produce a Braille edition of that magazine.

Such was his popularity and the respect in which he was held, that Jackson was given the Burmese nickname Apay-gyi, meaning "Big Father" or "Great Father".

== Decline, honour, and death ==
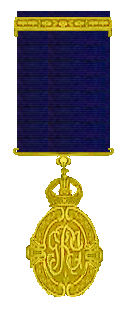
The Kaiser-I-Hind first class (gold) medal

In early 1930, Jackson returned to England on medical advice, to recuperate from an illness probably brought on by overwork. He returned to Burma later the same year. In May 1931 he again returned to England, to undergo surgery. On the arrival of his boat train at Victoria Station he was taken by ambulance directly to the London Hospital. Although he rallied after his operation, he knew that his time was short, and arranged to return again to Burma, his condition deteriorating during the voyage.

Jackson had been awarded the Kaisar-i-Hind Medal, first class, in the 1930 New Year Honours. It was presented to the dying Jackson at his bedside by the then Governor of Burma, Sir Charles Innes and his wife. Jackson died a few days later, on 6 December 1931, aged 42. His last words were reported to be "I shall be helping all I can on the other side". He was buried at Kemmendine Cemetery.

== Legacy ==
Shortly after his death, Jackson's sister Mary wrote a book about his life, An Ambassador in Bonds. It was published in 1932 by the Society for the Propagation of the Gospel in Foreign Parts, with an introduction by Rollestone Fyffe, the former Bishop of Rangoon. A second, shorter, biography, Blind Eagle: Father Jackson of Burma, drawing heavily on the first, but with more on his ministry work in London, was written by Stanley Sowton in 1950.

A bronze memorial plaque commemorating Jackson was erected inside Holy Trinity Cathedral in Yangon, and is extant.

The School for the Blind Kyimyindine, as it is now known, is still in operation. After Jackson's death it was operated by The Mission of St. Michael until 1 November 1963, when the Department of Social Welfare, part of the Myanmar Ministry of Social Welfare, Relief and Resettlement, took it on. In 2011, software to read and write the Burmese Braille first devised by Jackson was developed by a computer technician at the school.
