= Town Bank Grammar School =

English grammar school

Town Bank grammar school was an Early Modern grammar school in Ulverston, Lancashire from its foundation in 1658 until 1900. It was founded through a benefaction in the will of Thomas Fell.

A pupil's view in the late 18th century was:

The only scholastic education I received was at the Town Bank grammar-school, under the Rev. William Tyson Walker ... an excellent classical scholar, educated at Trinity College, Dublin. Before this the Town Bank school had fallen into the hands of an old gouty gentleman, of the name of Ferdinand (usually called Fardy by the boys) Hodgson, whose wife kept a sort of stationer's and bookseller's shop. His knowledge of Latin extended little beyond Syntaxix, As in Praesenti, and Pripria opus maribus &c; any further progress could only be had by a removal to a distance of sixteen miles, to the Free Grammar-school at Hawkshead, founded in 1584. Fardy Hodgson was particularly kind to me; and, being pleased one day at the manner in which I had performed my task, he took me by the hand into his shop, and spreading on the counter a great number of books for young people, he desired me to ... choose any one I pleased, as a present. I pitched upon a small History of the Bible, with wood-cuts, which so pleased the old man, that he foretold to my parents that I should prove a treasure to them.

— John Barrow, left school in 1774

From 1879 to 1882 the master was Arthur Richard Shilleto.

A parliamentary charity commissioner inquiry was launched in April 1893.

The school was replaced by the Victoria Grammar School in 1900 and its endowment was used to provide two scholarships to the new school.
