= Victor Shearburn =

Victor George Shearburn (28 October 1900 – 3 December 1975) was an eminent Anglican clergyman in the middle third of the 20th century.
He was educated at Felsted and Hertford College, Oxford. Ordained in 1924 he held curacies at All Souls, Clapton Park and St Barnabas, Pimlico before becoming a member of the Community of the Resurrection. In 1955 he became Bishop of Rangoon, a post he held for 11 years; retiring back to Mirfield, he served as an Assistant Bishop of Wakefield.

Religious titles
Preceded by George West	Bishop of Rangoon; 1955–1966	Succeeded by Francis Ah Mya
