= Burmese Braille =

Braille alphabet of languages written in Burmese script

Burmese Braille Karen Braille
- Script type: Alphabet
- Print basis: Burmese alphabet
- Languages: Burmese, Karen

Related scripts
- Parent systems: Braille: English Braille?; Burmese Braille

Burmese Braille is the braille alphabet of languages of Burma written in the Burmese script, including Burmese and Karen. Letters that may not seem at first glance to correspond to international norms are more recognizable when traditional romanization is considered. For example, သ s is rendered ⠹ th, which is how it was romanized when Burmese Braille was developed (and is how it often still is romanized); similarly စ c and ဇ j as ⠎ s and ⠵ z.

== History ==
The first braille alphabet for Burmese was developed by Father William Henry Jackson ca. 1918. There was no provision for the voiced aspirate series of consonants (gh, jh, dh, bh), nor for the retroflex (tt etc.), and Jackson provided distinct letters for complex onsets such as ky, hm and for various syllable rimes (ok, ein, aung, etc.), with no regard to how they are written in the print Burmese alphabet. These aspects have all been changed, as have several of the letters for the values which were retained. However, some of the old letters, unusual by international standards, remain, such as ⠌ for င ng and ⠪ for ီ i.

== Charts ==
=== Print letters ===
The letters in print Burmese transcribe consonants and, in syllable-initial position, vowels. The consonants each have a corresponding letter in braille, but the initial (stand-alone) vowels in print are in braille all written ⠰ plus the letter for the appropriate diacritic (see next section). The consonant ny has two forms in print which are distinct in braille as well.

Braille	⠅ (braille pattern dots-13)	⠨ (braille pattern dots-46)	⠛ (braille pattern dots-1245)	⠟ (braille pattern dots-12345)	⠌ (braille pattern dots-34)	⠎ (braille pattern dots-234)	⠖ (braille pattern dots-235)	⠵ (braille pattern dots-1356)	⠮ (braille pattern dots-2346)	⠷ (braille pattern dots-12356)
Print	က	ခ	ဂ	ဃ	င	စ	ဆ	ဇ	ဈ	ည
Roman	k	kh	g	gh	ng	c	ch	j	jh	ny
Braille	⠳ (braille pattern dots-1256)	⠻ (braille pattern dots-12456)	⠾ (braille pattern dots-23456)	⠿ (braille pattern dots-123456)	⠫ (braille pattern dots-1246)	⠞ (braille pattern dots-2345)	⠚ (braille pattern dots-245)	⠙ (braille pattern dots-145)	⠋ (braille pattern dots-124)	⠝ (braille pattern dots-1345)
Print	ဋ	ဌ	ဍ	ဎ	ဏ	တ	ထ	ဒ	ဓ	န
Roman	tt	tth	dd	ddh	nn	t	th	d	dh	n
Braille	⠏ (braille pattern dots-1234)	⠘ (braille pattern dots-45)	⠩ (braille pattern dots-146)	⠃ (braille pattern dots-12)	⠍ (braille pattern dots-134)	⠽ (braille pattern dots-13456)	⠗ (braille pattern dots-1235)	⠇ (braille pattern dots-123)	⠺ (braille pattern dots-2456)	⠹ (braille pattern dots-1456)
Print	ပ	ဖ	ဗ	ဘ	မ	ယ	ရ	လ	ဝ	သ
Roman	p	ph	b	bh	m	y	r	l_{1}	w	s
Braille	⠓ (braille pattern dots-125)	⠸ (braille pattern dots-456)	⠣ (braille pattern dots-126)	⠰ (braille pattern dots-56)						⠧ (braille pattern dots-1236)
Print	ဟ	ဠ	အ	(initial vowel)						ဉ
Roman	h	l	'	(initial vowel)						-ny-

=== Stacked consonants ===
The stacking of consonants (conjuncts) in print is indicated with ⠤ in braille. That is, Burmese Braille has two viramas, one corresponding to print virama (see next section), and one corresponding to stacking. For example, ကမ္ဘာ kambha "world" is written ⠅⠍⠤⠃⠁.

=== Print diacritics ===
The diacritics in print, which transcribe both vowels and consonants, are rendered as follows in Karen Braille.

Braille	⠁ (braille pattern dots-1)	⠰ (braille pattern dots-56) ⠁ (braille pattern dots-1)	⠊ (braille pattern dots-24)	⠪ (braille pattern dots-246)	⠑ (braille pattern dots-15)	⠥ (braille pattern dots-136)	⠱ (braille pattern dots-156)	⠡ (braille pattern dots-16)	⠴ (braille pattern dots-356)	⠉ (braille pattern dots-14)	⠐ (braille pattern dots-5)
Print	ာ	ါ	ိ	ီ	ု	ူ	ေ	ဲ	?	ံ	င်္
Roman	-a		-i.	-i	-u.	-u	-e	-ai:		-m	-ing

Braille	⠔ (braille pattern dots-35)	⠢ (braille pattern dots-26)	⠄ (braille pattern dots-3)	⠜ (braille pattern dots-345)	⠭ (braille pattern dots-1346)	⠂ (braille pattern dots-2)	⠆ (braille pattern dots-23)	⠰ (braille pattern dots-56)
Print	ျ	ြ	်	ွ	ှ	့	◌း	(initial vowel)
Roman	-y-	-r-	(virama)	-w-	h-	-.	-:	(initial vowel)

⠰ is used to mark syllable- or word-initial vowels, which have distinct letters in the Burmese print alphabet. For example,

braille	⠰⠑	is print	ဥ u.,
	⠰⠑⠪⠆	=	ဦး u:,
	⠰⠱	=	ဧ e,
	⠰⠊	=	ဣ i.,
and	⠰⠪	=	ဤ i.

=== Numbers ===
Burmese numerals are represented as follows:

	1	2	3	4	5	6	7	8	9	0
Braille	⠼ (braille pattern dots-3456) ⠁ (braille pattern dots-1)	⠼ (braille pattern dots-3456) ⠃ (braille pattern dots-12)	⠼ (braille pattern dots-3456) ⠉ (braille pattern dots-14)	⠼ (braille pattern dots-3456) ⠙ (braille pattern dots-145)	⠼ (braille pattern dots-3456) ⠑ (braille pattern dots-15)	⠼ (braille pattern dots-3456) ⠋ (braille pattern dots-124)	⠼ (braille pattern dots-3456) ⠛ (braille pattern dots-1245)	⠼ (braille pattern dots-3456) ⠓ (braille pattern dots-125)	⠼ (braille pattern dots-3456) ⠊ (braille pattern dots-24)	⠼ (braille pattern dots-3456) ⠚ (braille pattern dots-245)
Print	၁	၂	၃	၄	၅	၆	၇	၈	၉	၀

=== Punctuation ===
The following punctuation is specific to Burmese. (See Burmese alphabet#Punctuation for an explanation.) Western punctuation presumably uses Western braille conventions.

Braille	⠯ (braille pattern dots-12346)	⠕ (braille pattern dots-135)	⠦ (braille pattern dots-236)	⠬ (braille pattern dots-346)	?	?
Print	၍	၏	၌	၎င်း	၊	။
Roman	(..and..)	.	@	(ditto)	,	.
