= Thomas Boys =

Thomas Boys (1792–1880) was an Anglican priest and theologian.

== Life ==
His father was Rear-admiral Thomas Boys of Kent. He was born at Sandwich, Kent, and educated at Tonbridge Grammar School and Trinity College, Cambridge. The failure of his health from over-study prevented his taking more than the ordinary degrees (B.A. 1813, M.A. 1817), and, finding an active life necessary to him, he entered the army with a view to becoming a military chaplain, was attached to the military chest in the Peninsula under Wellington in 1813, and was wounded at the battle of Toulouse in three places, gaining the Peninsular Medal. He was ordained deacon in 1816, and priest in 1822.

He established a reputation as a Hebrew scholar, being teacher of Hebrew to Jews at the college, Hackney, from 1830 to 1832, and professor of Hebrew at the Missionary College, Islington, in 1836. While holding this last post, he revised Deodati's Italian Bible, and also the Arabic Bible.

Boys also made a translation of the Bible into Portuguese. He began by making a critical revision of João Ferreira de Almeida's version: according to The Bible of every Land, published by Samuel Bagster in 1848, Boys "appears to have completed the revision of the New Testament, and to have published small editions of the Gospels of Matthew and Mark, and of the Psalms". Then, in 1837, the Trinitarian Bible Society decided to publish a new Portuguese translation from the Greek and Hebrew texts, and appointed Boys to carry out the work. He was instructed to use Almeida's version as a basis, but carry out a careful comparison with the Hebrew, and to make his version comprehensible to contemporary readers. The New Testament was published in 1843, and the Old Testament in 1847.

In 1848 he was appointed incumbent of Holy Trinity, Hoxton. He died 2 September 1880, aged 88.

== Other writings ==
Boys was a prolific writer. In 1825 he published a key to the Psalms, and in 1827 a Plain Exposition of the New Testament. Already in 1821 he had issued a volume of sermons, and in 1824 a book entitled Tactica Sacra, expounding a theory that in the arrangement of the New Testament writings a parallelism could be detected similar to that used in the writings of the Jewish prophets. In 1832 he published The Suppressed Evidence, or Proofs of the Miraculous Faith and Experience of the Church of Christ in all ages, from authentic records of the Fathers, Waldenses, Hussites.., . The same year produced a plea for verbal inspiration under the title A Word for the Bible, and 1834 A Help to Hebrew.

He was a frequent contributor of sketches and papers to Blackwood's Magazine, mostly descriptive of his experiences during the Peninsular War. The most important of these was "My Peninsular Medal", which ran from November 1849 to July 1850. His acquaintance with the literature and antiquities of the Jews was very thorough, but perhaps the best proofs of his extensive learning are to be found in the numerous letters and papers, sometimes under his own name, and sometimes under the assumed name of "Vedette", contributed to the second series of Notes and Queries. Of these the twelve papers on Chaucer difficulties are a most valuable contribution to the study of early English literature.
