= Holy Trinity, Hoxton =

- Holy Trinity with St Mary, Hoxton
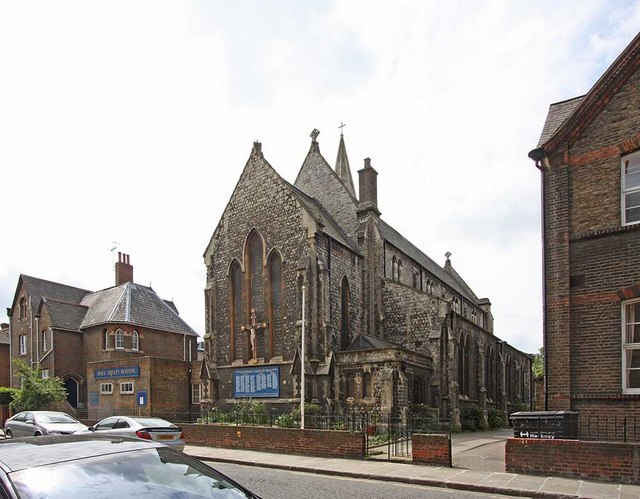
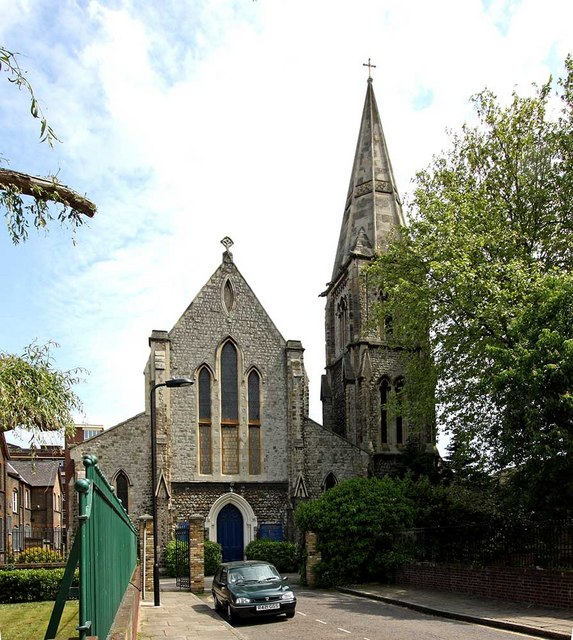
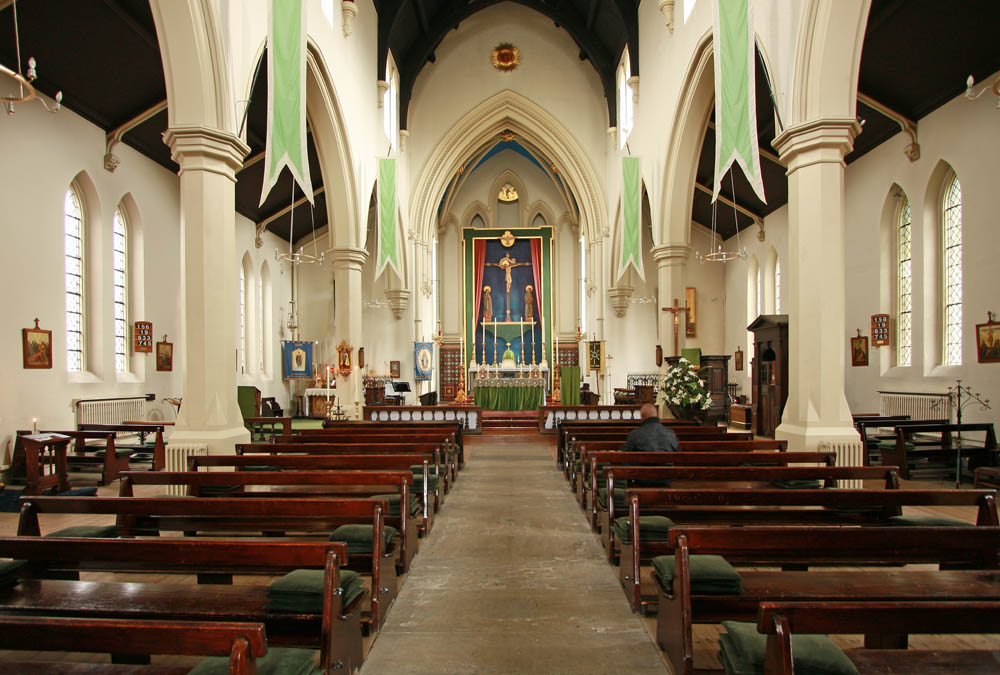
- The vicarage and church's east end, from Bletchley Street N1. The church's west end, from Alford Place N1. Interior view looking east.

- Location within Greater London
- 51°31′50.12″N 0°5′27.96″W
- OS grid reference: TQ 32465 83079
- Location: Hoxton
- Country: England
- Denomination: Church of England
- Tradition: Anglo-Catholic
- Website: Official website

History
- Founded: 1848

Architecture
- Architect: William Railton
- Style: 13th-century English Gothic

Administration
- Province: Canterbury
- Diocese: Diocese of London
- Archdeaconry: Hackney
- Deanery: Hackney

Clergy
- Bishop: The Bishop of Fulham
- Priest: Fr Aidan Bartlett SSC (Priest in Charge)

Holy Trinity, Hoxton is an Anglican church in the Hoxton district of the London Borough of Hackney. The church is notable not only for its distinctive tower and broach spire but also for its long adherence to 'High Church' doctrines and liturgical practices. In 1941 Holy Trinity merged with the parish of St Mary, Britannia Walk N1 after the latter was made unusable by WW2 aerial bombing.

== The church building ==
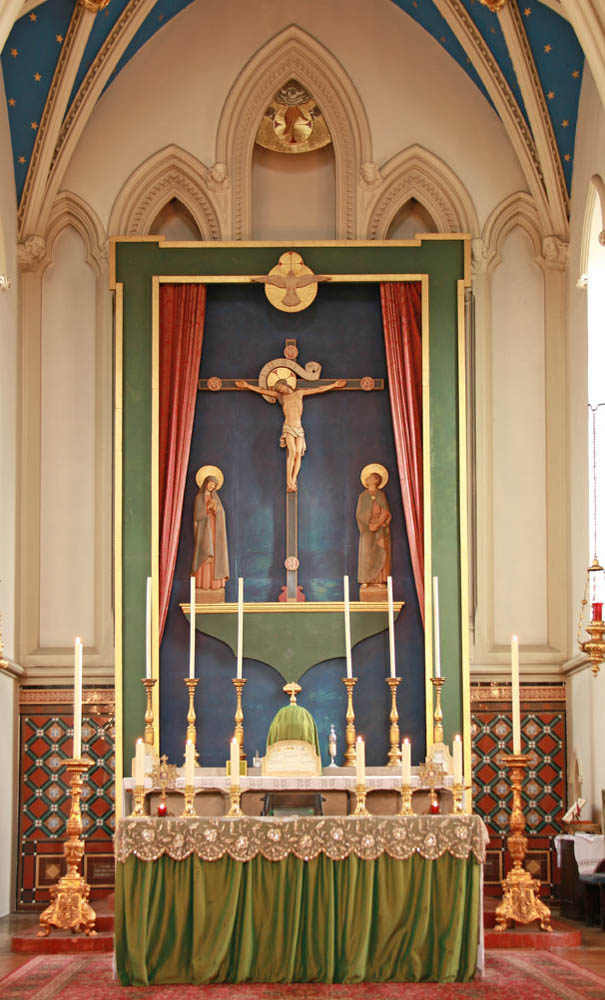
High Altar 2012

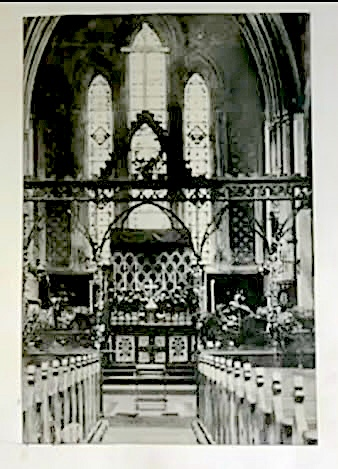
High Altar 1906

The Grade-II listed building was completed in 1848 to the design of William Railton (1800–77), the designer of Nelson's Column. Railton's design for Holy Trinity is inspired by 13th-century English examples and is constructed with Kentish Ragstone. The interior has tall, thin arcades on octagonal piers and whitened walls.

=== Baptistry ===
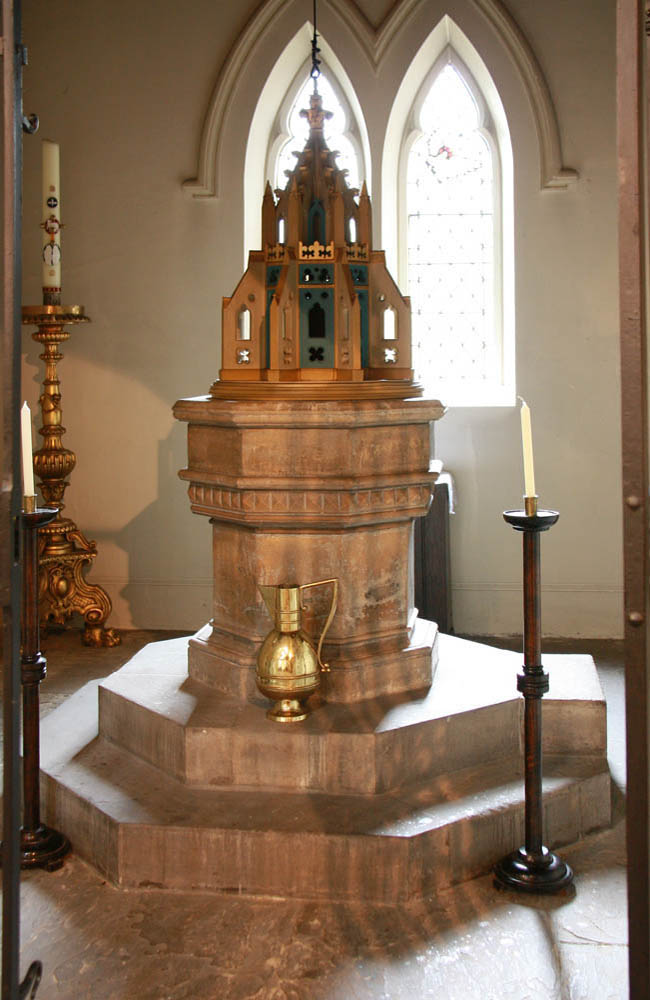
Baptistry 2012

In 1896 the lowest portion of the tower was converted to a baptistry opening into the south-west corner of the church, to the design of Spencer W Grant (1879–1914).

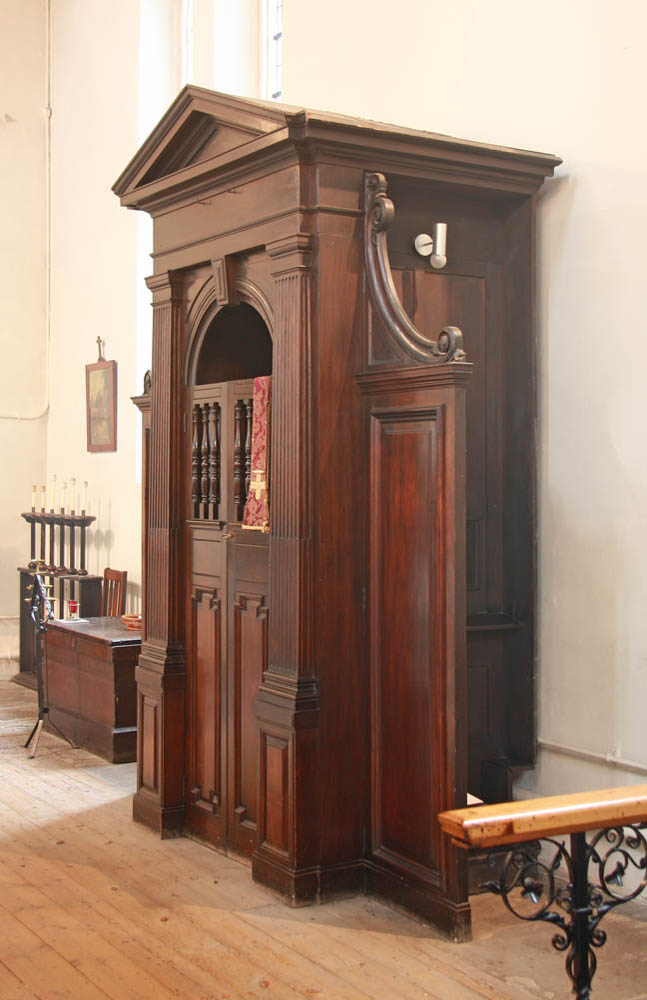
Confessional 2012

=== Post-war changes ===
Following WW2 aerial bombing in January 1941 that damaged the building the chancel area was reordered in 1942 under the supervision of Martin Travers (1886–1948), as follows:

- the high altar was remade using stones from six local churches bomber out during 1940–1.
- the east-end lancet windows were filled in and covered by a large framed panel above the altar containing a gilded rood by Rev. William E.A. Lockett (1916–2000). The roundel above depicts the Holy Spirit as a dove and is by Martin Travers as too a gilded roundel above the chancel arch.
- the organ on the south side of the chancel was put beyond repair by the bombing and was cleared away.
- a new confessional with tall Corinthian pilasters was provided, possibly from old woodwork.
- a west gallery was installed, adorned with hatchments, ready for a replacement pipe-organ.

A description of the church in 1947 adds:

There are two Holy Water Stoups, and there are shrines dedicated to the "Sacred Heart," "St. George," and "St. Joseph." Above a side altar there is an image of the Virgin and Child, the principal figure of the Virgin being adorned with an elaborate blue robe. At the back of the Church there is a Pieta and an altar for the offering of Requiem Masses for departed souls.

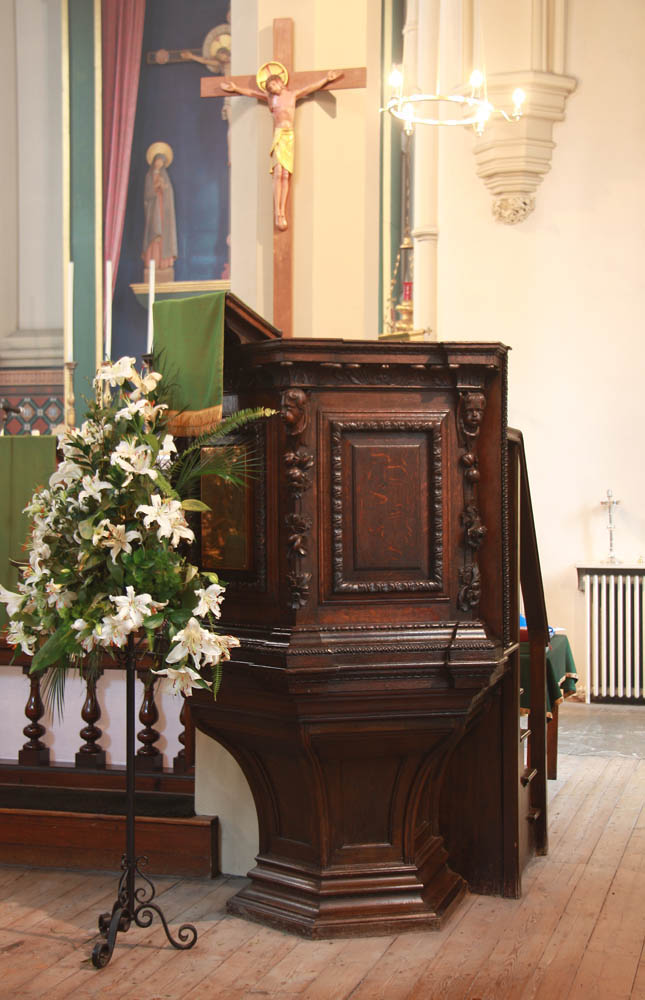
Pulpit 2012

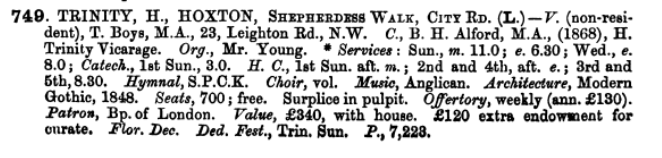
Parish profile in 1875)

==== Items from St Mary Hoxton ====
At the time when Holy Trinity suffered aerial-bomb damage, and by the same air-raid, the church of St Mary, Britannia Walk, Hoxton, was made entirely derelict. This church had inherited a number of historic items from the City church of St Mary Somerset Street (demolished 1871), specifically:

- a pulpit made in 1695 by joiner Samuel Port (n.d.) with carvings of flowers and heads of cherubs executed by Jonathan Maine (active 1680–1709).
- communion plate (early nineteenth century)
- a font and font cover
- a bell

==== The pipe organ ====
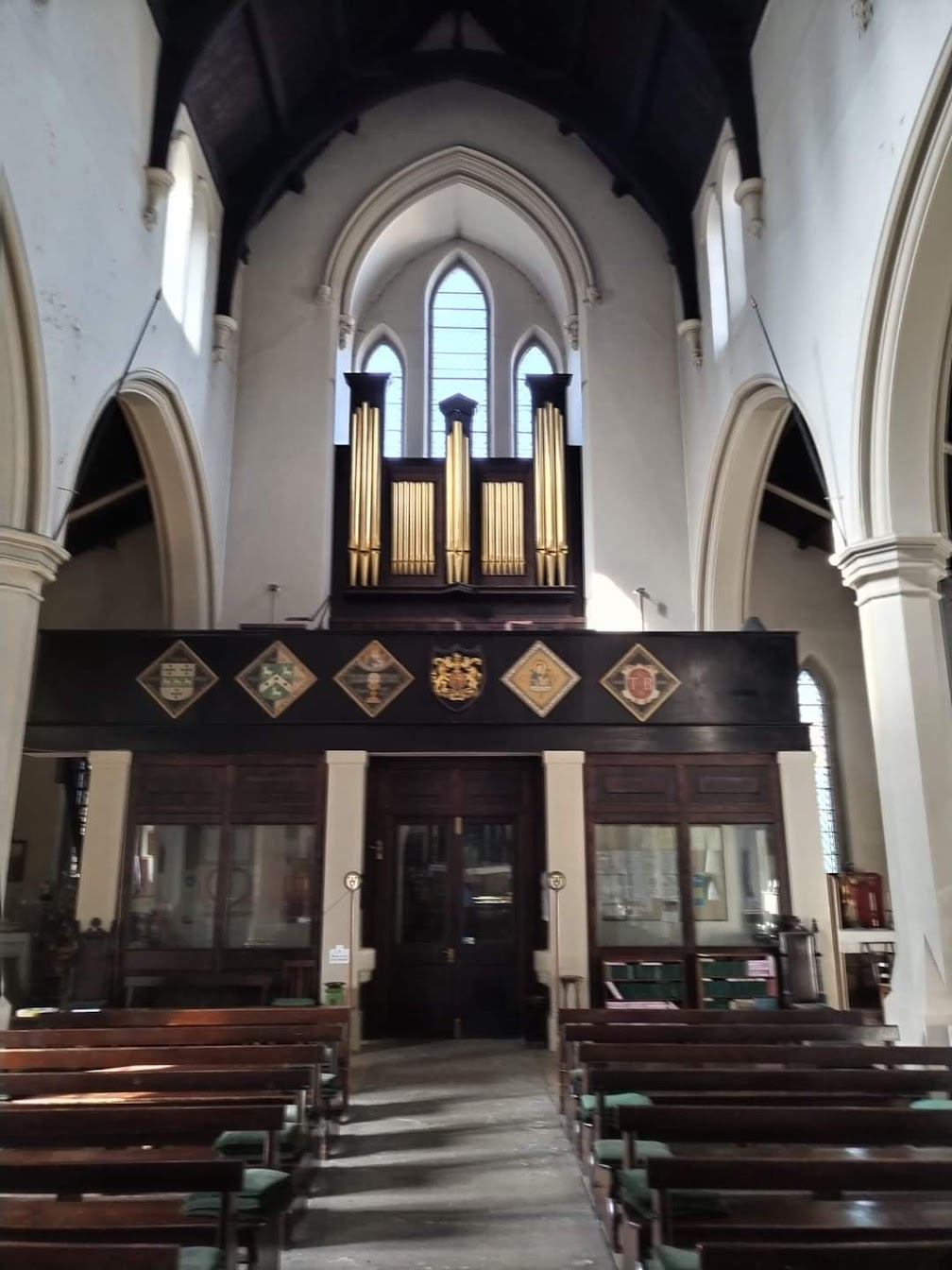
Organ gallery 2024

The current pipe organ of 1952 is by the firm of John Compton and is located on a west gallery. The previous organ by Bishop & Starr was located in the south chancel and removed following WW2 bomb damage.

== The school building ==
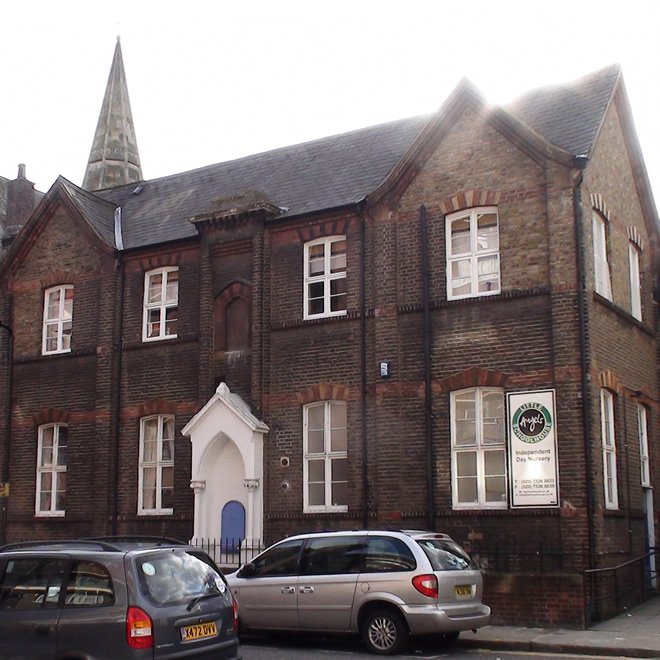
Former Holy Trinity School

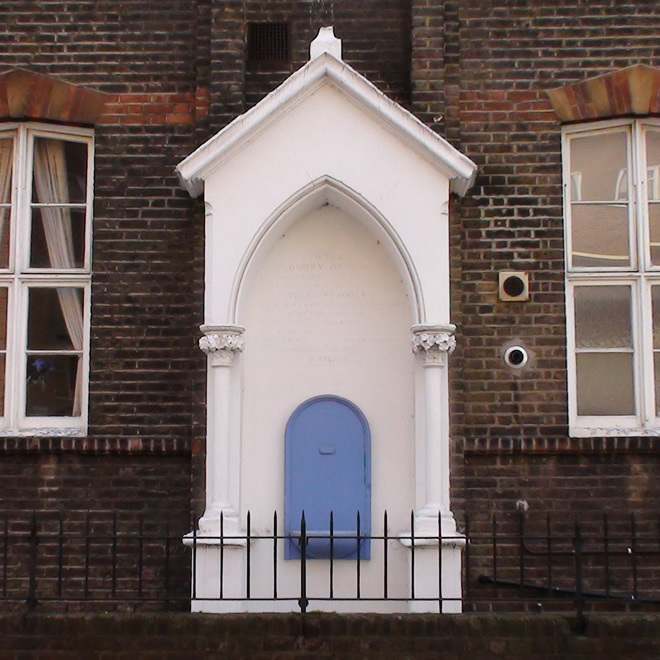
Drinking fountain at former Holy Trinity School

Adjacent to the church to the north-east is the former parish school, a building now used as the parish halls. It was opened in 1864 at a cost of £1,687 (worth £180,117.95 in August 2024) and was designed to accommodate "between 600 and 700 children; boys, girls, and infants". One apparently noteworthy provision was a drinking-fountain that was accessible to the public as well as the children, "and in that crowded neighbourhood it is hoped will prove a great boon." The architect was Arthur Ashpitel (1807–69) and the builder Messrs. Carter of Westminster. The Dedication Stone reads:

To the Glory of God and for the benefit of the poor of all religious {illegible}, these schools, built mainly by the employers of London in the neighbourhood upon ground given by the incumbent, The Rev. T. Boys, were opened by the Bishop of London on the 25th day of May MDCCCLXIV (1864).

== The English Missal ==
Rev Henry Kenrick, the Vicar from 1905 to 1937 was the progenitor of the influential and widely adopted Missale Anglicanum : English Missal, which he developed for use at Holy Trinity, Hoxton. It was first published in 1912 (London : W. Knott) and went through several editions in the following years.

== List of clergy ==
- 2024-present: Aidan Bartlett. Priest-in-charge.
- 2022–24: Christopher Trundle. Priest-in-charge.
  - 2022–24: Aidan Bartlett. Curate.
- 2011–21: Andrew Newcombe: Vicar.
- 2002–09: Iain Young. Vicar.
- 1997–2002: Iain Young: Priest-in-charge.
- 1982–96: Stuart Wilson. Vicar.
  - 1992–93: Steven McKenna. Curate.
  - 1986–92: Roger Reader. Curate.
- 1969–82: Brian Masters. Vicar.
  - 1978–83: Paul Williamson. Curate.
  - 1976–77: Rodney Simons. Curate.
  - 1972–75: Christopher Back. Curate.
  - 1969–72: Alan Amos. Curate.
- 1954-68: Kenneth Loveless. Vicar.
  - 1967–69: Alan Page. Curate.Vicar.
  - 1964–67: Kenneth Leech: Curate.
  - 1963–67: Brian Boucher. Curate.
  - 1956–64: Michael Stephenson. Curate.
  - 1955–58: George Silver. Curate.
- 1937–1953: Cecil Vincent. Vicar.
- 1905–37: Henry Kenrick. Vicar.
  - ?–1929: A. Webb-Bowen. Curate.
  - ?-1924: Arthur Dale. Curate.
  - ?-1918: W Dolman. Curate.
  - 1917–18: William Jackson. Curate.
- 1892–1905: Jacob Cartmell-Robinson. Vicar.
- : ? Vicar ...
- 1880–90: W Sotheby. Vicar.
  - 1885-?: H. Sidney Brown. Curate.
  - 1884-85: Frederick Ford. Curate.
- : ? Vicar ...
  - 1874–5: Arthur Shilleto. Curate.
- 1863–68: Thomas Fowle. Vicar.
- 1848–62: Thomas Boys: Vicar.

== List of organists ==
- : ?
- in 1911: Mr Mills.
- : ?
- in 1897: Henry Bagg.
- in 1895: Charles Lee.
- 1893–95: Frederick Russell (BA. BMus).
- : ?
- 1888: Organist and choirmaster post advertised, salary £35. the equivalent in August 2024 is £3,822.79.
- :?
- : in 1875: Mr Young.
- : ?
- Henry Horse 1899 - 1912

== External reference and further reading ==
=== Biographical articles ===
- 'Rev Henry William Gordon Kenrick (1862-1943)'.Natstand. Online resource, accessed 29 September 2024.
- 'Rev Kenneth Loveless (1911-1995)' by Ivor Allsop. Folk Music Journal, Vol. 7, No. 1 (1995), 131-132. (London: English Folk Dance and Song Society). Online resource, accessed: 29 September 2024.
- Rev Andrew Newcombe (b.1970). RequiemSurvey. Online resource, accessed 3 October 2024.
