= Arthur Richard Shilleto =

English clergyman and schoolmaster (1848–1894)

The Reverend Arthur Richard Shilleto (18 June 1848 – 19 January 1894) was a British clergyman and schoolmaster. He was the son of the classicist Richard Shilleto (1809–1876).

== Life ==
Shilleto was educated at Harrow School, and graduated from Trinity College, Cambridge, in 1871, receiving his MA in 1875. He was ordained as a deacon in 1871, then as a priest in 1872, and served curacies in Lambourne, Essex (1871–73), Holy Trinity, Hoxton (1874–75), and Haigh, Lancashire (1876). In 1877 he was appointed second master at the King Edward VI School at Stratford-upon-Avon, and from 1879 to 1882 he was master of Ulverston school. He was curate of Satterthwaite, Lancashire from 1881 to 1883, and of Lower Slaughter, Gloucestershire, from 1883 to 1885. He died, after suffering from mental illness for several years, in 1894.

There is a monument to Shilleto, his father, and other family members, in Mill Road Cemetery, Cambridge.

== Works ==
For Bohn's Classical Library he translated Pausanias' Description of Greece (2 vols. 1886), and also Plutarch's Morals (1888), and for Bohn's Standard Library he revised William Whiston's Works of Flavius Josephus (5 vols. 1889–90). He also prepared notes for an edition of Burton's Anatomy of Melancholy, which was published in 1893, with an introduction by A. H. Bullen. He was a frequent contributor to Notes and Queries under the anagram "Erato Hills".
