= Arthur Knight (bishop) =

Bishop of Rangoon from 1903 to 1909

Arthur Mesac Knight (9 July 1864 – 4 October 1939) was the third Bishop of Rangoon from 1903 to 1909.

He was educated at Rossall and Pembroke College, Cambridge. Ordained in 1890, he was initially a Curate at St Andrew's, Bishop Auckland before becoming Fellow and Dean of Gonville and Caius College, Cambridge and a Lecturer in Divinity at the university.

He was nominated to the episcopate in December 1902, based on the recommendation of the Secretary of State for India. He subsequently received the doctorate of divinity (DD) (honoris causa) from the University of Cambridge in January 1903, was formally appointed the following month, and consecrated Bishop (by the Archbishop of Canterbury) at Westminster Abbey on 24 February 1903. Taking up the position in Rangoon early in 1903, he only served for six years, afterwards becoming Warden of St Augustine's Missionary College, Canterbury. From 1928, his last posts were as Rector of Lyminge (until 1935) and Assistant Bishop of Canterbury (until his death).

Church of England titles
Preceded by John Strachan	Bishop of Rangoon; 1903–1909	Succeeded by Rollestone Fyffe
