= Christianity in Myanmar =

Christianity in Myanmar has a history dating to the early 18th century. According to the 2014 census, Christianity is the country's second largest religion, practiced by 6.3% of the population, primarily among the Kachin, Chin and Kayin, and Eurasians because of missionary work in their respective areas. In 2023, almost 8% of the population is Christian; about two-thirds of the country's Christians are Protestants, in particular Baptists of the Myanmar Baptist Convention. One in six Christians are Catholics.

Christians have faced some hostility or even persecution since the 1920s. Christians have not moved to the higher echelons of power. A small number of foreign Christian missionary organisations have been permitted to enter the country to conduct religious conversion work, such as World Vision following Cyclone Nargis. A long-standing ban on the free entry of missionaries and religious materials has persisted since independence in 1948, which is seen as hostile to Christianity. The burning of Christian churches is reported in Southeastern Myanmar.

== By Church ==
=== Catholicism ===
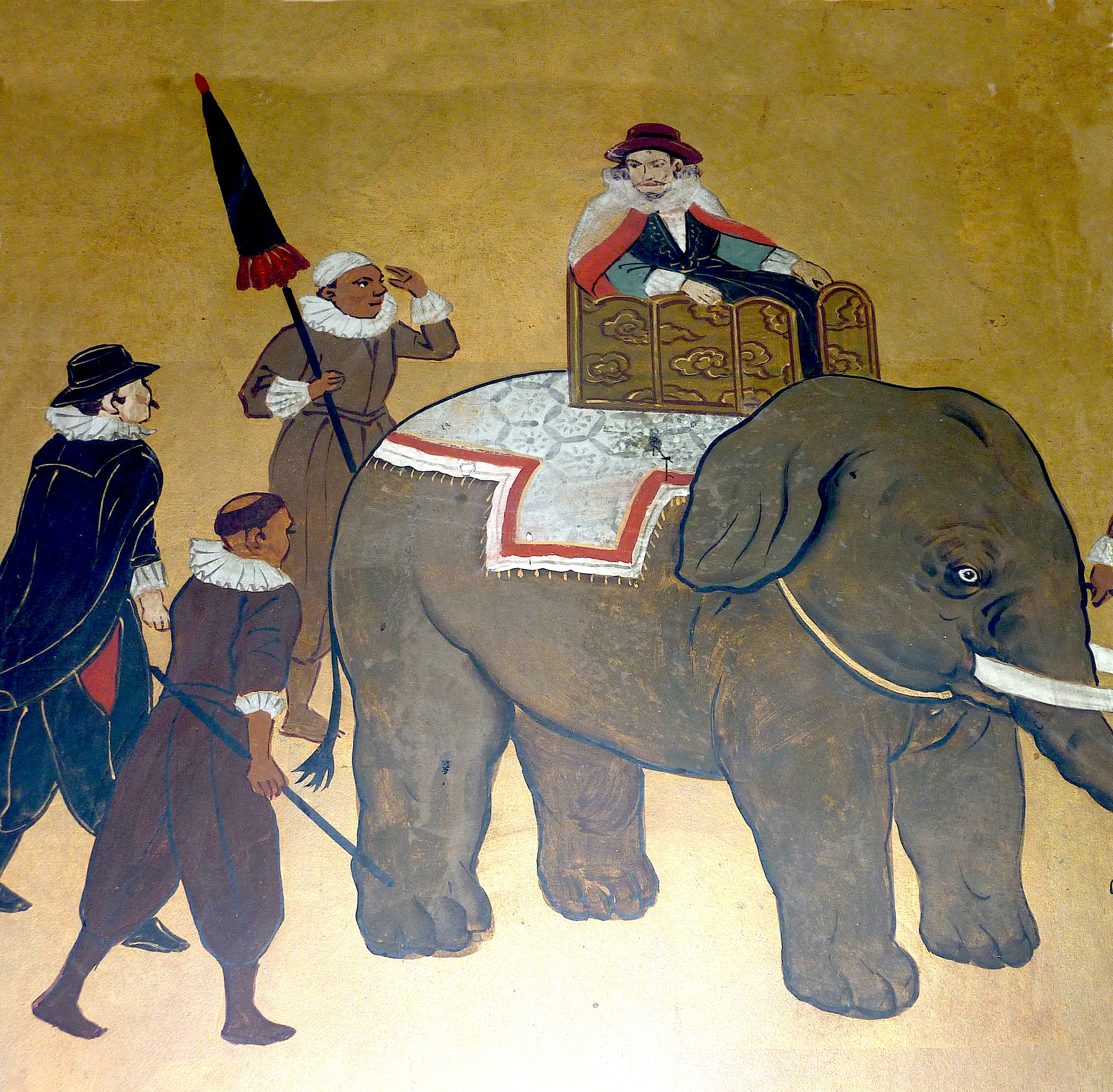
Filipe de Brito, Portuguese mercenary and governor of Syriam

In the 17th century, Portuguese missionaries arrived. In 1925, there were two priests. Several Catholic missionaries arrived in the 1830s from Europe, and by 1841, there were 4500 Catholics. The first nuns arrived in 1847–52. By 1862, the Catholics had one bishop, 11 missionaries, one native priest, one college, and about 6000 members. 1992. Membership was about 27,000, with 66 missionaries and 12 native priests. The Catholics operated two seminaries and 73 schools with 3900 students. Today there is a small Catholic element. The Catholic element reached 121,000 population by 1933.

=== Protestantism ===
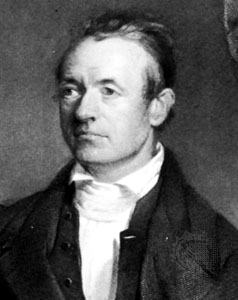
Adoniram Judson

The Protestant churches of Burma were begun in the early 19th century by Adoniram Judson (1788–1850), an American Baptist missionary. It took years of intensive preaching before he reached his first convert, but the numbers grew rapidly, reaching 10,000 by 1851. He translated the Bible into Burmese in 1834.

In 1865, the Myanmar Baptist Convention was established and in 1927, the Willis and Orlinda Pierce Divinity School was founded in Rangoon as a Baptist seminary. It is still operating as the Myanmar Institute of Theology, catering to students of many Protestant denominations. The majority of converts came from the Karen ethnic group in the mountainous areas, and not from the Buddhists. By the census of 1921 Christians totalled 257,000, or two percent of the total population. This included about 50,000 Christians of Indian, English or Eurasian heritage, and 69% were Karens.

After 1914, the Buddhist element became much more nationalistic and highly resistant to Christianity. There was hostility toward the Christian Karens and toward Indian immigrants as well. The Protestant population reached 192,000 in 1926, with the Baptists in the forefront, with over 200 missionaries. Increasingly, the native community took control of the Protestant organizations.

=== Oriental Orthodoxy ===
There is a small Armenian Orthodox Christian minority in Burma centred on St. John the Baptist Armenian Apostolic Church in Yangon.

== History ==
When the Japanese seized Burma in 1942, the British and American missionaries fled, but they returned in 1945. Independence from Britain came in 1947, and for years there was simmering tension and sometimes military action by the government against the Karens. This strengthened the Christian religiosity of the Karen minority, and deepened the hostility of the majority Buddhist population toward Christianity. In 1959, the Catholics numbered 184,000, and Protestants were 225,000; most of the Protestants were Baptists. The Catholics began transferring control from the missionaries to local elements in 1959, with the appointment of the Archbishop of Mandalay who is a descendant of Portuguese who arrived in the 17th century. Likewise, the Protestants transferred control to locals in the 1950s.

In 1966, all foreign missionaries were expelled by the Burmese government, but the Burmese Protestant church has become a vibrant missionary-sending movement, despite financial limitations and geographic isolation. The growth in conversions to Christianity can also be attributed to changes in generations of minority groups from animism to Christianity, or as a reaction to Buddhist nationalism, generally associated with the Burmese majority, although this has also been happening in nearby parts of northeastern India as well, where the states of Nagaland and Mizoram, both of which border Myanmar, are now majority Christian. The percentage of Christians in the Chin minority group grew from 35% in 1966 to 90% in 2010 and in the Kachin minority group, it grew from 40% in 1966 to 90~95% in 2010.

Generally speaking, most Christians are from the minority ethnic groups such as the Chin, Karen, Lisu, Kachin, and Lahu. Baptists, Assemblies of God, Methodists and Anglicans form the strongest denominations in Myanmar. The CIA World Factbook mentions that 4% of the population of Myanmar is Christian (Baptist 3%, Catholic 1%). The Anglican Communion is represented in Myanmar by the Church of the Province of Myanmar. As of 2006, it has about 62,000 members.

Henry Van Thio has been Second Vice President of Myanmar since 2016. He is an ethnic Chin and a member of the United Pentecostal Church International, making him the first non-Buddhist, as well as the first Christian, to hold the office of the Vice President of Myanmar. His faith has been the subject of controversy, as after his appointment nationalist monks protested saying that only Buddhists should hold political positions.

In 2015, the U.S. Embassy in Myanmar announced that it gave an award of $125,000 to World Monuments Fund (WMF) to restore the historic First Baptist Church in Mawlamyine (Moulmein) through the Ambassadors Fund for Cultural Preservation. First Baptist Church in Mawlamyine is Myanmar's first Baptist church and it was initially built in 1827 by Adoniram Judson.

== Christianity by state ==
The 2014 Population and Housing Census Report gives the following statistics of Christianity in Myanmar.

State	Population	Christianity (2014 Census)	% of State Population
Ayeyawady	6,184,829	388,348	6.3%
Bago	4,867,373	142,528	2.9%
Chin State	478,801	408,730	85.4%
Kachin State	1,642,841	555,037	33.8%
Kayah State	286,627	131,237	45.8%
Kayin State	1,504,326	142,875	9.5%
Magway	3,917,055	27,015	0.7%
Mandalay	6,165,723	65,061	1.1%
Mon State	2,054,393	10,800	0.5%
Nay Pyi Taw	1,160,242	12,293	1.1%
Rakhine State	2,098,807	36,791	1.8%
Sagaing	5,325,347	349,377	6.5%
Shan State	5,824,432	569,389	9.8%
Tanintharyi	1,408,401	100,758	7.2%
Yangon	7,360,703	232,249	3.2%
Myanmar	50,279,900	3,172,479	6.3%

== Freedom of religion ==
In 2026, the country was scored 1 out of 4 for religious freedom.

In the same year, Open Doors ranked the country as the 14th worst place in the world to be a Christian.

== See also ==
- Religion in Myanmar
- Armenians in Myanmar
- Cathedrals in Myanmar
