= Richard Shilleto =

English classical scholar (1809–1876)

Richard Shilleto (25 November 1809 – 24 September 1876), English classical scholar, was born at Ulleskelf in Yorkshire.

He was educated at Repton and Shrewsbury, then Trinity College, Cambridge, where he graduated second classic in 1832. Though Shilleto did not become a fellow of Trinity, marrying Isabella S. H. Snelgar in 1834, he spent the rest of his life in Cambridge as a 'coach'(private tutor) in classics. His son Arthur Richard Shilleto was born in 1848. In 1867 he was elected a fellow of Peterhouse.

Shilleto was one of the greatest Greek scholars that England has produced; in addition, he had an intimate acquaintance with the Latin and English languages and literature. He published little, being obliged to devote the best years of his life to private tuition. He was the most famous classical coach of his day, and almost all the best men passed through his hands.

His edition of the De falsa legatione of Demosthenes will always remain a standard work, but his first two books of Thucydides (an instalment of a long-contemplated edition) hardly came up to expectation. His pamphlet Thucydides or Grote? excited a considerable amount of feeling. While it undoubtedly damaged Grote's reputation as a scholar, it was felt that it showed a want of appreciation of the special greatness of the historian. Shilleto's powers as a translator from English into Greek (especially prose) and Latin were unrivalled; a selection of his versions was published in 1901.
