= John Strachan (bishop of Rangoon) =

John Miller Strachan (1832–1906) was the second Bishop of Rangoon.

He was born in Barnsley and educated at King's College London. He was ordained in 1861 and was a SPG in India until his episcopal appointment. He served as a medical missionary in Madras, India for 19 years.

He was consecrated on 1 May 1882. and served until 1902 when he resigned his see. He became a Doctor of Divinity (DD). He died 3 May 1906 in Farnham, Surrey, aged 74.

Church of England titles
Preceded by Jonathan Titcomb	Bishop of Rangoon; 1882–1903	Succeeded by Arthur Knight
