= Jacob Isaacs (merchant) =

Jamaican merchant and planter

Jacob Isaacs (9 October 1799 – 24 May 1870) was a Jamaican merchant and planter who moved to London and established a successful career.

== Early life and family ==
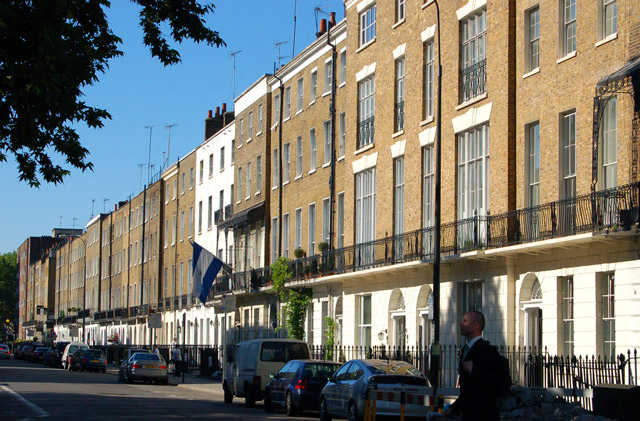
Modern view of 5 Dorset Square (centre right with painted lintels).

Jacob Isaacs was born in Jamaica on 9 October 1799, the son of Solomon Isaacs. He was Jewish.

He married Eliza, also born in Jamaica, and they had children Sarah G. (1835–), Agnes (1836–1889), Georgina (1838–), Eliza (1841–), Albert Henry (c. 1841–), Augusta Mary (1843), Lydia (1846–), Edith Annie (1847–1925), Ellen Octavia (1849–), and Mabel I. (1852–). The four oldest were born in Jamaica and the younger children in London.

== Career ==
Isaacs was registered as a slave-owner in St Elizabeth, Jamaica, in 1832. In 1836 he received compensation for 7 freed African slaves who he owned, in the amounts of £110 and £29.

By the time of the 1851 British census he was living at 5 Dorset Square, Marylebone, London, and trading as a merchant. He was able to employ governess, a nurse, a nursemaid and four servants. He was still there at the time of the 1861 census when he was described as a "Merchant West Indian". His son Albert was working in his father's business in 1861 and Isaacs was able to afford to employ a nurse, an invalid attendant and six servants.

He had premises at 7 Jeffreys Square in the City of London, a square off St Mary Axe that no longer exists.

== Death and legacy ==
Isaacs died on 24 May 1870 at 1a Cavendish Road, St John's Wood, Middlesex, leaving an estate not exceeding £30,000. He was survived by his wife Eliza.
