= Stephen Than Myint Oo =

Burmese Anglican bishop (born 1958)

The Most Reverend Stephen Than Myint Oo
- Archbishop of Myanmar, Bishop of Yangon
- Church: Church of the Province of Myanmar
- In office: 2008-present
- Predecessor: Samuel San Si Htay

Orders
- Consecration: 2005 by Samuel San Si Htay

Personal details
- Born: 1958 (age 67–68)

Stephen Than Myint Oo (born 1958) is a Burmese Anglican bishop. He has been the primate and archbishop of the Church of the Province of Myanmar and Bishop of Yangon since 2008.

== Ecclesiastical career ==
He studied at the Trinity Theological College in Singapore, returning to Myanmar afterwards. He was first a parish priest, then becoming lecturer and afterwards dean of the Holy Cross Theological College in Yangon in 1993.

He was elected bishop of the Diocese of Hpa-An in 2005. He would be in office until his election as the 6th Archbishop of Myanmar, at the general synod held at Holy Trinity Cathedral in Yangon, among five candidates, on 15 January 2008. His enthronement took place on 17 February 2008 when he was also enthroned the 13th Bishop of Yangon. Among the representatives who attended the ceremony were Archbishop John Chew of the Church of the Province of South East Asia and Bishop Michael Scott-Joynt of the Diocese of Winchester in the Church of England who represented the Archbishop of Canterbury, Rowan Williams.

He attended, with all the Burmese Anglican College of Bishops, the Lambeth Conference in August 2008. He became a supporter of the Anglican realignment movement as a member of the Global South and the Fellowship of Confessing Anglicans primates. He attended the Global South Fourth Encounter in Singapore from 19-23 April 2010. He was also one of the seven Anglican archbishops present at the enthronement of Foley Beach as the second primate and archbishop of the Anglican Church in North America on 9 October 2014. Than is also the global trustee of the Anglican Relief and Development Fund. He attended GAFCON III, held in Jerusalem, on 17-22 June 2018.

== Detention ==
The archbishop has spent time in prison during the country's military rule.

Anglican Communion titles
Preceded by Samuel San Si Htay	Primate of the Province of the Church of Myanmar; 2008–present	Incumbent
