= John Aung Hla =

John Aung Hla was an eminent Anglican priest in the 20th century. He was ordained in 1939 and then became Archdeacon of Mandalay in 1946, He became Assistant Bishop of Rangoon in 1949. He and Francis Ah Mya were the first native bishops in Calcutta. He was consecrated a bishop on Pentecost day (5 June) by George Hubback, Bishop of Calcutta, at St Paul's Cathedral, Calcutta.

In 1958, he became the first Burmese national to attend the Lambeth Conference in England.

In 1973, he became the second Archbishop of Burma, succeeding Archbishop Ah Mya.
