= Francis Ah Mya =

Anglican Archbishop in India and Burma

Francis Ah Mya was an Anglican Archbishop in India and Burma (now Myanmar) in the mid-20th century.

He was educated at the Bishop's College in Calcutta and ordained in 1933. He was a tutor at the Divinity School, Rangoon from 1933 to 1940 and then the incumbent at St Matthew Moulmein until 1949. He became archdeacon of Toungoo in 1946 and was placed in charge of St Peter's Bible School when it was moved to Kappli.

He was appointed to the episcopate as assistant bishop of Rangoon in 1949; he and John Aung Hla were the first native bishops in Calcutta. He was consecrated a bishop on Pentecost day (5 June), by George Hubback, Bishop of Calcutta, at St Paul's Cathedral, Calcutta. In 1966 he became its diocesan and in 1970 established a new Anglican Province with himself as Archbishop, resigning in 1972.

Ah Mya transformed Rangoon into an autonomous province independent of the Province of India, Pakistan, and Burma; he also worked on lay associations within the church as well as self-supporting projects and an evening Bible school.

In 1981, he reopened the Mindon mission.

== WWII ==
During the Second World War he was held as a prisoner of war by the Japanese. It was said that he became the leader of other POWs. He managed to persuade the Commandant to release other prisoners and himself under a plan given to him by God. — This story is told in the book "Going My Way" by Godfrey Winn.

Religious titles
Preceded by Victor Shearburn	Bishop of Rangoon; 1966 – 1972	Succeeded by John Aung Hla
New title	Archbishop of Burma; 1970 – 1972	Succeeded by John Aung Hla
