= Rollestone Fyffe =

Rollestone Sterritt Fyffe (also spelled Rolleston; 1868 – 3 April 1964) was the fourth Bishop of Rangoon.

Born in 1868, the son of an army doctor, he was educated at Clifton and Emmanuel College, Cambridge. Ordained in 1894, his first posts were curacies at St Michael, Bishop Wearmouth and St Agnes Church, Bristol, where he later became vicar. From 1904 to 1910 he was an SPG Missionary in Mandalay when he was elevated to the episcopate, serving for 18 years. Afterwards he became Vicar of Westfield, East Sussex. He died on 3 April 1964.

== Notes ==
Church of England titles
Preceded by Arthur Mesac Knight	Bishop of Rangoon; 1910 – 1928	Succeeded by Norman Henry Tubbs
