= Church of the Province of Myanmar =

Member Church of the Anglican Communion

- မြန်မာနိုင်ငံခရစ်ယာန်အသင်းတော် (အင်္ဂလီကန်)
- Classification: Protestant
- Orientation: Anglican
- Scripture: Holy Bible
- Theology: Anglican doctrine
- Polity: Episcopal
- Primate: Stephen Than Myint Oo
- Associations: Anglican Communion, GAFCON, Global South
- Headquarters: Yangon
- Territory: Myanmar (Burma)
- Members: c. 70,000
- Official website: https://www.anglicanmyanmar.org/

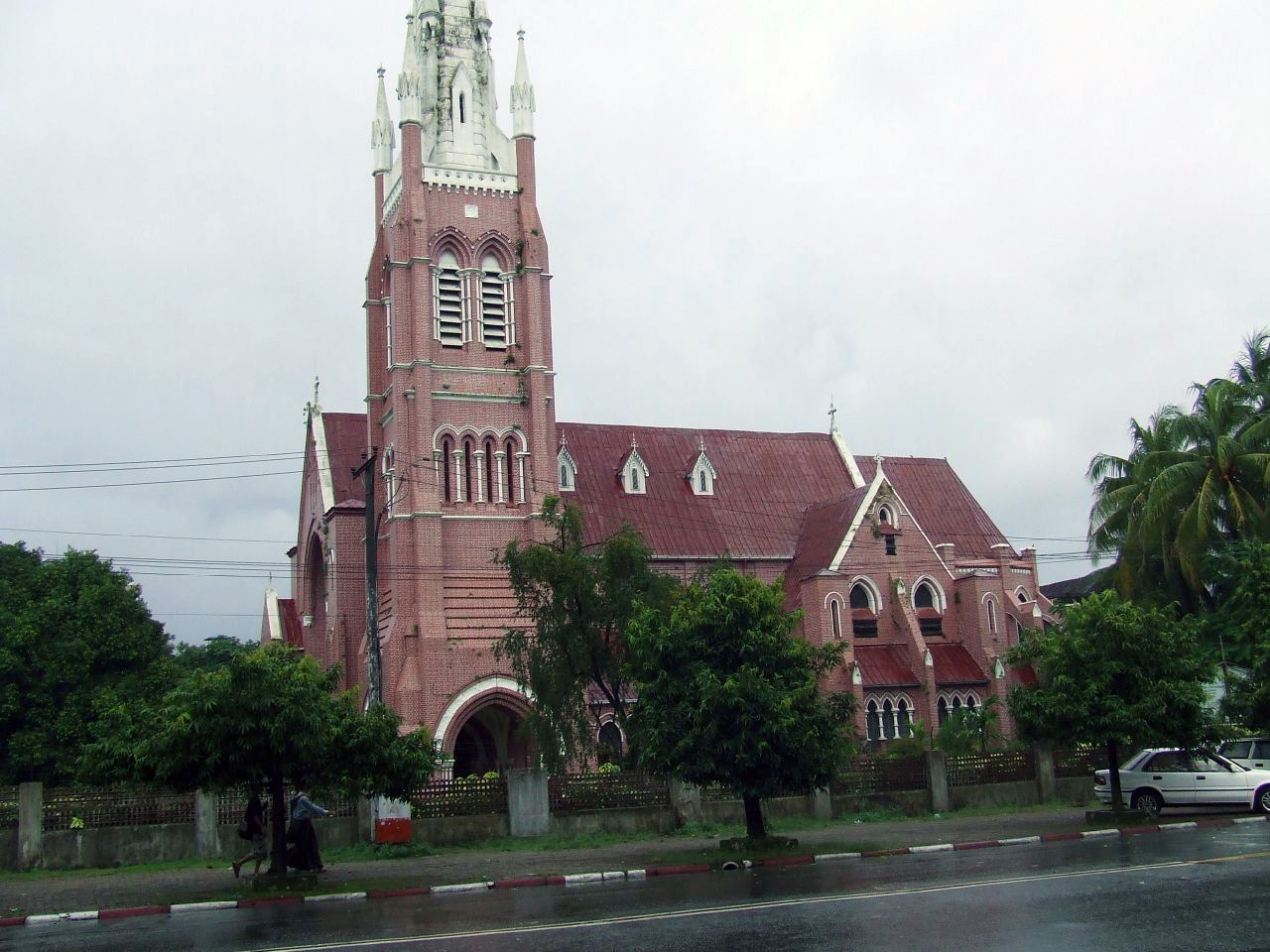
Holy Trinity Cathedral, Yangon

The Church of the Province of Myanmar (Burmese: မြန်မာနိုင်ငံခရစ်ယာန်အသင်းတော် (အင်္ဂလီကန်)) is a member church of the Anglican Communion. The province comprises the entire country of Myanmar. The current archbishop of Myanmar and bishop of Yangon is Stephen Than Myint Oo. The church claims around 70,000 members.

== Name ==
The Church of the Province of Burma was created as an independent province of the Anglican Communion on 22 February 1970, and changed its name to the Church of the Province of Myanmar when the new country's name was adopted in 1989.

== History ==
St John's College, Yangon

Throughout the colonial period the Church of England had a strong presence in the country because the majority of the British belonged to that church. The great majority of the Anglo-Burmese and Anglo-Indian communities in the country were also Anglicans and the number of schools run by the Church of England to educate British and Eurasian children increased. Notable schools include St Mary's and St Michael's in Maymyo and Mandalay. Until 1930 the church was part of the Church of England in India but it was then made an autonomous ecclesiastical province of the Anglican Communion and renamed the Church of India, Burma and Ceylon. With independence the number of Anglicans in the country decreased with the departure of the British and the subsequent exodus of the Anglo-Burmese and Anglo-Indians.

=== Brief history ===
- 1825 With British army some Anglican priests came into Burma, not as missionaries but as army chaplains.
- 1854 SPG (Society for the Propagation of the Gospel) began its mission in Burma. The interest in missions among the English residents of Burma attracted the attention of the SPG to the country and thus in 1854 the SPG sent his first missionary, Cockey, to Maulmein where educational work had been already begun.
- 1859 The SPG sent Augustus Shears and his wife from England to missionary school in Maulmein.
- 1860 J. D. Marks, a trained educationalist, arrived, who enlarged and developed the school in Maulmein which had been started.
- 1863 J. D. Marks opened a school in Yangon (later this school became St John's College). Maung Shwe Zan was baptised by A. Shears as the first Myanmar native Christian in England. A woman named Cook established a school for women, named St Mary's Girls school, in Yangon.
- 1868 Invited by the King Mindon, J. E. Marks went to Mandalay and founded a school as well as started his mission there.
- 1870 J. E. Marks opened the schools in Zalon, Hanzada and Theyet Myo and started mission in delta.
- 1872 Mission among Tamils was started in Moulmein.
- 1873 C. Warren started the mission among Burmese in Taungoo.
- 1874 Based in Kemmendine, J. A. Colbeck started mission among Burmese and other ethnic groups.
- 1875 Because of their internal problem, many Karen Baptists from Taungoo came into the Anglican Church and thus the Karen Anglican population increased dramatically in Taungoo.
- 1877 On 24 February, Rangoon Diocese was opened and it was under the Province of Calcutta. J. H. Titcomb was the first bishop of Rangoon. As a first native Burmese, J. San Baw was ordained as a deacon in England.
- 1877–1882 J. H. Titcomb (the first bishop of Rangoon (Yangon))
- 1878 Four Karens were ordained as deacons and they are the first native Karen clergy. Samuel Abishe Ganathan was ordained as the first Tamil deacon and he became the missionary of the Tamils who lived in Moulmein. Since before mission among Chinese was started in Yangon.
- 1882 Titcomb retired and J. M. Strachan who had served in India became the second bishop of Yangon.
- 1882–1903 John Miller Strachan (the second bishop of Rangoon)
- 1883 J. Fairclough opened a catechetic training school in Kemmdine. T.Richard started mission in east Pazondaung in Rangoon.
- 1884 J. San Baw was ordained as priest at the Holy Trinity Church, the pro cathedral.
- 1888 H. M. Stocking started mission in Shwebo, in middle Burma.
- 1892 A. H. Ellis started Winchester Mission in Rangoon.
- 1893 Hackeny opened St Peter's Bible School in Taungoo.
- 1894 Making Thayetmyo as his centre, C. R. Torkington, a layman, started mission among Asho Chins.
- 1899–1900 Taking centre in Prome, G. Whitehead started mission among Chin tribes.
- 1900 W. C. B. Purser stated mission in Kyatlatt.
- 1901 After receiving their deacon ordinations, David Po Sa and Po Thet who are native Burmese clergy, joined the Kyatlatt mission and they extended their mission to other areas in delta.
- 1903 A. M. Knight became the third bishop of Rangoon Diocese.
- 1903–1909 Arthur M. Knight (the third bishop of Rangoon)
- 1904 Some Pow Karens from Kyaundawkalay located in delta began to enter into Anglican instruction.
- 1907 Mission to Seamen started in Rangoon.
- 1909 R. S. Fyffe, who served in Mandalay as a missionary of Wnchester Brotherhood became the fourth bishop of Rangoon Diocese. Pow Karen from Mhawbe near Rangoon began to become Anglicans.
- 1909–1928 R. S. Fyffe (the fourth bishop of Rangoon)
- 1910 Anglican mission spread to other Pow Karen areas in delta – Nyanugdone, Pantanaw, Wakema and Shweloung.
- 1914 The first Rangoon Diocesan Council was held in Rangoon. William Purser opened Kemmendine Blind School. Purser's wife began mission among mothers in Kemmedine.
- 1917 Father William Henry Jackson, who was a blind priest and was called as "Apay-gyi"; meaning, great father, came to Kemmendine and lead the Kemmendine Blind School.
- 1918 Saya Tawmhwa from St.Paul’s Church of Taungoo was sent as a missionary to Kappli in Pann, the southeast part of Burma.
- 1921 Samuel U Tun who was an Asho Chin, and Nashone Mahn Own Bwint who was a Karen, were ordained as deacons and who were the first clergy for their respective tribes. Peter Khin Maung who the first native BD degree holder from Bishop College in Calcutta, obtained the priest ordination.
- 1924 A. T. Houghton from Bible Churchmen’s Missionary Society started mission among Kachins in Moenhyin.
- 1925 The new version of Burmese Bible, which was translated into Burmese by Bible Society led by C. E. Garrad, was published.
- 1926 The Bible Churchmen's Society (BCMS) started its mission in Hukong areas in Kamine, the northern Burma. Rangoon Diocesan Trust Assiociation was formed.
- 1928 N. H. Tubbs became the fifth bishop of Rangoon.
- 1928–1935 Norman Henry Tubbs (the fifth bishop of Rangoon)
- 1929 H. Hacking from Bible Churchmen's Missionary Society started mission among Khume Chings in Palawa.
- 1930 Church of India, Burma and Ceylon was formed and opened.
- 1931 Emmanuel Bible School was opened in Monyin in northern Burma; William Henry Jackson died
- 1932 In August, Conference of the Clergy was held in Rangoon. BCMS started its mission in Wontho in Shan state.
- 1934 A building for the Bible school was started in Inya road. This building was consecrated in 1935. In the same year the Kukekine Bible School was shifted to that Bible school and it was named as 'Holy Cross College.'
- 1935 G. A. West who served in Kappli in Pann became the sixth bishop of Rangoon.
- 1935–1954 George A. West (the sixth bishop of Rangoon)
- 1936 On 3 May, as the first Karen national, Saya Saw Satphaw, was ordained as a deacon by BCMS mission in Monyin.
- 1937 On 25 March, as the first Kachin, U Khamawgum, obtained his deacon ordination. In the same year Emmanuel Church in Monyin was consecrated.
- 1938 W. B. Johnston opened a missionary hospital in Pinlone in southern Shan State.
- 1939 A. T. Houghton was elected as the assistant Bishop of Rangoon. Because of World War Two this programme was broken.
- 1940 World War Two came into Burma and foreign missionaries had to depart from the country.
- 1941 In January, the Japanese army crossed the Sanlwin River came and into Burma and the Kappli mission was disconnected with Rangoon. Because of the severe attack of the Japanese army, all missionaries and foreign civilians including their families moved to upper Burma.
- 1942 George Appleton was appointed as archdeacon by West to look after the mission of Burma from India. Since Burma was occupied by the Japanese, all mission works including missionary schools and hospitals were stopped and most native Anglicans dispersed. The native clergy and ministers risked their lives in serving among those dispersed Anglicans in that difficult and dangerous period. Many native martyrs appeared in that period.
- 1945 In July, West returned from abroad and stayed in Rangoon.
- 1946 To reorganize the church, West created three archdeaconries, one for Delta, one for Mandalay and one for Toungoo. These posts were filled by national clergy, Luke Po Kun, J. Aung Hla and Ah Mya respectively. Holy Cross College was reopened by R. W. Garrad.
- 1947 Rangoon Diocesan Council was held in Moylmein. Church of the province of India, Pakistan, Burma and Ceylon was formed as a new province in Anglican Communion.
- 1948 Tidey took in charge for Holy Cross College. St. Peter’s Bible School from Taungoo was shifted to Kappli in Paan and Francis Ah Mya took in charge it.
- 1949 As the first native bishops, Francis Ah Mya and John Aung Hla were consecrated as assistant Bishops in Calcutta.
- 1950 The Holy Cross College was closed temporarily.
- 1951 The Emanuel Bible School which was closed for ten years, was reopened by D.H.Dansey.
- 1952 Rangoon Diocesan Council, which could not be held for five years, was held in Rangoon.
- 1955 V. G. Shearburn who was a monk from St. Augustine’s Community of Resurrection became the seventh bishop of Rangoon. U Ta Hwai was ordained as a deacon and he was the first Khume Chin clergy. Holy Cross was reopened with 13 students and J Maung Pe became the first national Principal.
- 1955–1966 Victor G. Shearburn (the seventh bishop of Rangoon)
- 1956 Shearburn started Summer School.
- 1957 Moulmein archdeaconry was opened and Francis An Mya was appointed as archdeacon there. He started the self-supporting programme in Pann.
- 1958 Assistant bishop John Aung Hla attended the Lambeth Conference held in England, as the first Burmese national.
- 1959 Some students from Holy Cross Theological College were sent abroad for further study. Esther Hla Kyaw, as the first native Karen woman, was appointed as a youth leader.
- 1960 On 23 October, Anglican youth leaders from the whole Burma were invited to The Youth Conference in Rangoon and the conference formed " Anglican Young People Association (AYPA)." Religious Education Department was founded and Dorothy Lewis became the department head. Taking responsibility as the editor, Elijah began to published the New Letter of the Church. Hoping to the emergence of the educated clergy. The church sent some young people to universities and after completion of their studies they were also sent to Holy Cross College.
- 1961 As the first Kachin native, Kushin Hla became the principal of Emanuel Bible School in Monyin. U Tote Yow who is a Khume Chin and U Yone Htow received deacon ordinations.
- 1963 Peter's Bible School which was closed nearly ten years was shifted to Pann and reopened there.
- 1964 Some graduated young people began to enter Holy Cross College.
- 1965 The Special Evangelism Project was started in Palawa. The Period of Myanmar National Bishops
- 1966 All missionaries had to depart from Burma. On 28 August 1966, Francis Ah Mya became the first native bishop of Rangoon Diocese. Rangoon Diocesan Men's Assiociation was formed and U Ba Than became the head of this association. Daw Nelly, a native woman was appointed as the organizer of Mothers' Union. Leading by the bishop the Anglican Churn in Myanmar actively participated in Burma Christian Council. Eleven Anglican graduated young people were sent to Burma Divinity School to pursue higher theological education.
- 1966–1970 Francis Ah Mya (the first national Bishop of Rangoon diocese)
- 1967 " The Three in One Project" was started with sixteen young people in Indaw in Upper Burma. The purpose of this project included three main concerns - to do evangelism with new method, to have self-support by doing anima husbandry and cultivation and to create a community of monks and a community of nuns. To reorganize the church to be a well established one, the bishop introduced a plan called " The New Form of the Church," and mobilized it till almost all parishes in the whole diocese. The Diocesan Council held in this year made an agreement to create a new Anglican province in Burma. The bishop started self-supporting plan.
- 1968 In January, the provincial council of the church of India, Pakistan, Burma and Ceylon made the first time approval for this proposal of forming a province in Burma.
- 1970 January, the proposal for forming a new Anglican province in Myanmar was approved by the Provincial Council of the India, Pakistan, Burma and Ceylon as second time. In February, there appeared " The Church of the Province of Burma ( Myanmar)," the Myanmar National Anglican Church. Rangoon (Yangon) Diocese, therefore, become one of the diocese in this province. Francis Ah Mya became the first archbishop of the Church of the Province of Burma.
- 1970–1973 Francis Ah Mya (the first archbishop of the Church of the Province of Burma (Myanmar))
- 1971 In December, Anglican Young People Association (AYPA) presented the first Christian religious play at the memorial hall located in the Baptist headquarter compound. Based on the lives of Christ and the apostles, the religious plays have been presented almost every year since 1971. Evening Bible class for lay people was opened in Anglican Religious Training Centre in Rangoon (Yangon).
- 1972 Central Rangoon (Yangon) Religious Education Committee was formed.
- 1973 The first summer training course of Central Rangoon Religious Education Committee was started. Leading by AYPA and supporting by Mother’s Union, The Samuel Project was started. The purpose of this project was to produce educated clergymen. The assistant bishop John Aung Hla became the second archbishop of the Church of the Province of Myanmar. The worker priests plan was started.
- 1973–1979 John Aung Hla (the second archbishop of the Church of the Province of Burma)
- 1975 Rangoon (Yangon) Diocesan Aid Board was formed.
- 1976 Led by Toteyow the mission among Lay Myo Chins was started.
- 1979 In June, Gregory Hla Kyaw, the former bishop of Pann Diocese, became the third archbishop of the Church of the Province of Myanmar.
- 1979–1987 Gregory Hla Kyaw (the third archbishop of the Church of the Province of Myanmar)
- 1981 Mindon mission was restarted by the retired archbishop Francis Ah Mya.
- 1982 The Catechist Training was opened in Anglican Religious Training Centre in Rangoon (Yangon).
- 1984 Partnership in Mission Programme was started.
- 1986 Mission in Hakhine hill was started. The Provincial Council approved Myitkyina archdeaconry to become Myitkyina Missionary Diocese.
- 1987 Gregory died.
- 1988 Andrew Mya Han became the fourth archbishop of the Church of the Province of Myanmar. Andrew Hla Aung became the bishop of Myitkyina Samuel San Si Htay, the former principal of Holy Cross Theological College, became the assistant bishop of Yangon.
- 1988–2001 Andrew Mya Han (the fourth archbishop of The Church of The Province of Burma)
- 1991 The church opened the decade of Evangelism.
- 1992 Conferences on evangelism were held in every dioceses and mission works in new areas were started. Taungoo area which was a part of Paan Diocese became Taungoo Missionary and George Kyaw Mya was the bishop.
- 1993 In place of San Si Htay who had become the general secretary of Myanmar Council of Churches (MCC), J. Than Pe, the former Archdeacon of Yangon Diocese, became the Assistant Bishop of Yangon Diocese. Tin Maung became the Archdeacon of Yangon Diocese.
- 1994 Led by Paul A. Chan, St John College was opened at Holy Trinity Cathedral. In January, Taungoo Missionary Diocese became Taungoo Diocese and John Wilme, the former principal of Holy Cross Theology College, became the first bishop of Taungoo Diocese.
- 1995 Social development projects were started in every diocese.
- 1999 A Bible school was opened in St Michael's and all Angels' Church in Kemmendine.
- 2001 Samuel San Si Htay became the fifth archbishop of the Church of the Province of Myanmar.
- 2005 Stephen Than Myint Oo from Holy Cross Theological College became the fifth Diocesan bishop of Hpa-an.
- 2005 the first gathering of Church of the Province of Myanmar was celebrated at Taungoo Diocese.
- 2008 Stephen Than Myint Oo, Diocese of Hpa-an, became the sixth archbishop of the Church of the Province of Myanmar.
- 2008 Stylo becomes the sixth Diocesan bishop of Hpa-an.
- 2008 In May, the Nargis Cyclone hit the delta area of Myanmar and the CPM involved actively with mission teams for the relief works.
- 2008 All the bishops and the Archbishop of Myanmar attended the Lambeth Conference.
- 2009 James Min Din former Distributor of Myanmar Bible Society and Secretary of Anglican Young People's Association became the Diocesan Bishop of Sittwe.
- 2010 The second Church of the Province of Myanmar gathering, Myitkyina (1–8 December 2010), from six dioceses.
- 2015 The third Church of the Province of Myanmar gathering, Yangon, from six dioceses.
- 2021 The Missionary Diocese of Homalin is created, led by Bishop Alan Kyaw Myo Naing.

== Membership ==
In 1966 all foreign missionaries were forced to leave the country. Today there are at least 70,000 Anglicans in an estimated population of 50 to 55 million in Myanmar.

== Structure ==
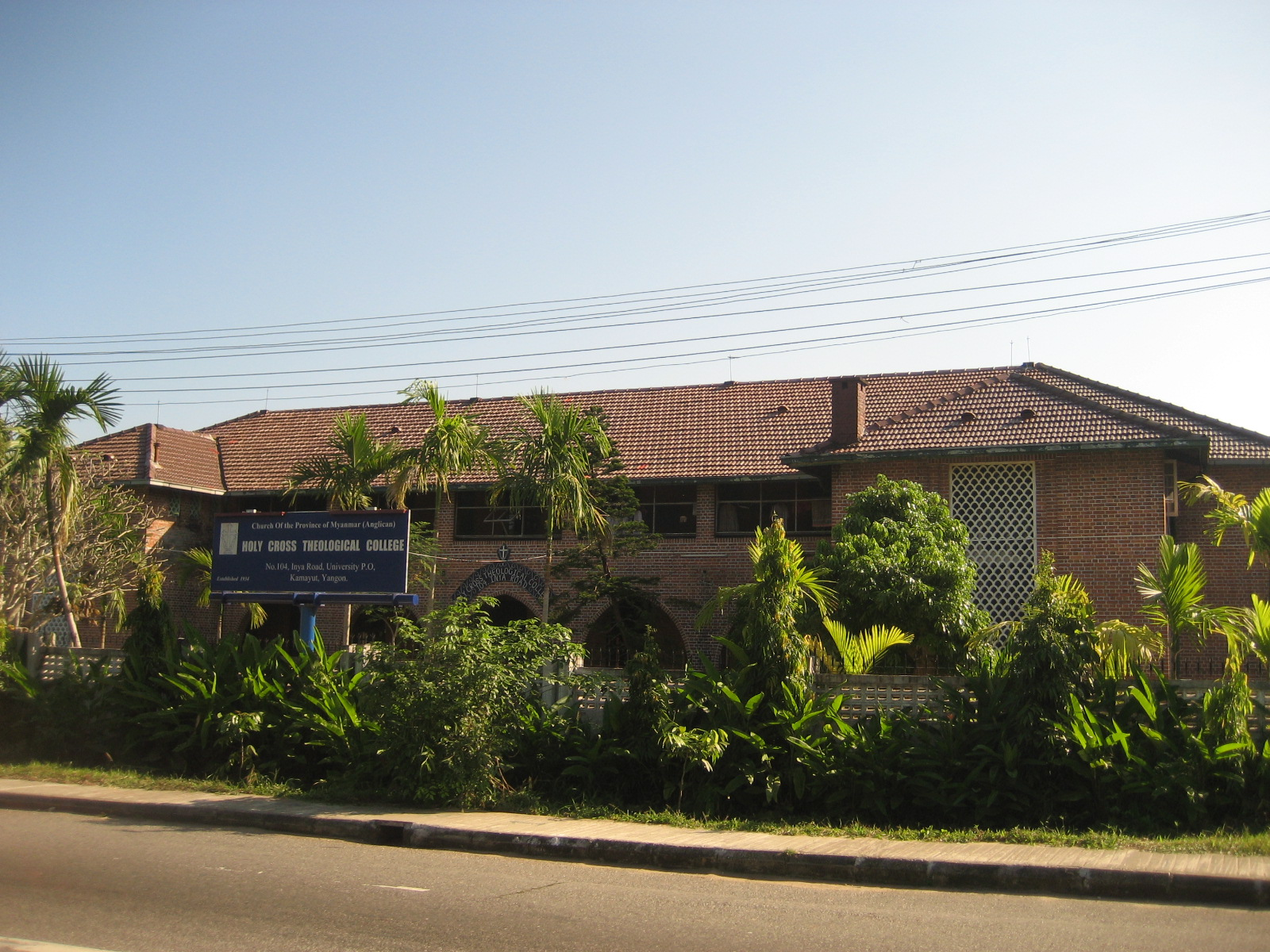
Holy Cross Theological College, Yangon

The polity of the Church of the Province of Myanmar is episcopacy (church governance with the three-fold ministry), the same as other Anglican churches. The church maintains a system of geographical parishes organized into dioceses (there are six of these, each headed by a bishop and assistant bishop).

=== Yangon and the Archbishops ===
The current Bishop of Yangon and Archbishop of Myanmar is Stephen Than Myint Oo.

=== Diocese of Hpa-an ===
Erected from Rangoon diocese in 1978; St Peter's Cathedral, Hpa-an.

Bishops of Hpa-an

- ?–1979: Gregory Hla Kyaw (became Archbishop)
- 9 September 1979 – 1992: George Kyaw Mya
- 1992 – after 2000: Daniel Hoi Kyin
- fourth bishop
- 2005–2008: Stephen Than Myint Oo (became Archbishop)
- 21 September 2008 – 2017: Saw Stylo
- 8 October 2017 – present: Mark Saw Maung Doe

=== Diocese of Mandalay ===
Erected 1970 October (18) from Yangon diocese; Christ Church Cathedral, Mandalay.

Bishops of Mandalay

- 1984 – after 1992: Timothy Mya Wah
  - before 1987 – after 1992: J. Kumsawng Tu, assistant bishop (in Myitkyina)
- 1988 – after 2007: Andrew Hla Aung
- ?–present: David Nyi Nyi Naing

=== Diocese of Myitkyina ===
Missionary district, from Mandalay diocese, created 1987; erected a diocese 1990; Christ the King Cathedral, Myitkyina.

Bishops of Myitkyina

- 1988–?: Andrew Hla Aung
  - in 1992: J. Kumsawng Tu, assistant bishop
- in 2000: John Shan Lum
- in 2007: David Than Lwin
- bef. 2015 – present: John Zau Li

=== Diocese of Sittwe ===
Erected 1990 from Yangon diocese; St Mark's Cathedral, Sittwe.

Bishops of Sittwe

- before 2000 – after 2007: Barnabas Theaung Hawi
  - before 2000 – after 2007: Aung Tha Tun, assistant bishop
- 2007–present: James Min Dein

=== Diocese of Toungoo ===
Missionary district created from Pann diocese, 1992; erected a diocese 1994; St Paul's Cathedral, Toungoo.

Bishops of Toungoo

- 1992–?: George Kyaw Mya, missionary bishop
- 1994–2019 (John Saw Wilme)
- 2019–present: Dr.Saw Shee Shoe

=== Departments for ministry and mission ===
There are mainly four departments for ministry and mission under the province, diocese and parish administration.

- Mothers' Union (MU)
- Men's Association (MA)
- Anglican Young People's Association (AYPA)
- Religious Education and Music Department (REM)

== Worship and liturgy ==
The Church of the Province of Myanmar embraces three orders of ordained ministry: deacon, priest and bishop. A local version of the Book of Common Prayer, stemming from the 1960 Church of India, Pakistan, Burma and Ceylon version, is used.

== Doctrine and practice ==
The centre of the Church of the Province of Myanmar's teaching is the life and resurrection of Jesus Christ. The basic teachings of the church, or catechism, includes:

- Jesus Christ is fully human and fully God. He died and was resurrected from the dead.
- Jesus provides the way of eternal life for those who believe.
- The Old and New Testaments of the Bible were written by people "under the inspiration of the Holy Spirit". The Apocrypha are additional books that are used in Christian worship but not for the formation of doctrine.
- The two great and necessary sacraments are Holy Baptism and Holy Eucharist
- Other sacramental rites are confirmation, ordination, marriage, reconciliation of a penitent and unction.
- Belief in heaven and hell and Jesus's return in glory.

The threefold sources of authority in Anglicanism are scripture, tradition and reason. These three sources uphold and critique each other in a dynamic way. This balance of scripture, tradition and reason is traced to the work of Richard Hooker, a sixteenth-century apologist. In Hooker's model scripture is the primary means of arriving at doctrine and things stated plainly in scripture are accepted as true. Issues that are ambiguous are determined by tradition, which is checked by reason.

=== Ecumenical relations ===
Like many other Anglican churches, the Church of the Province of Myanmar is a member of many ecumenical bodies, including the World Council of Churches.

== Anglican realignment ==
The Church of the Province of Myanmar is a member of the Global South and the Global Anglican Future Conference, and has been involved in the Anglican realignment. Archbishop Stephen Than Myint Oo was one of the seven Anglican archbishops that took place in the enthronement of Foley Beach as the second archbishop and Primate of the Anglican Church in North America on 9 October 2014.
