= Holy Trinity Cathedral, Yangon =

Anglican cathedral in Myanmar

Coordinates: 16°46′48.12″N 96°9′13.81″E

Designations

Yangon City Landmark

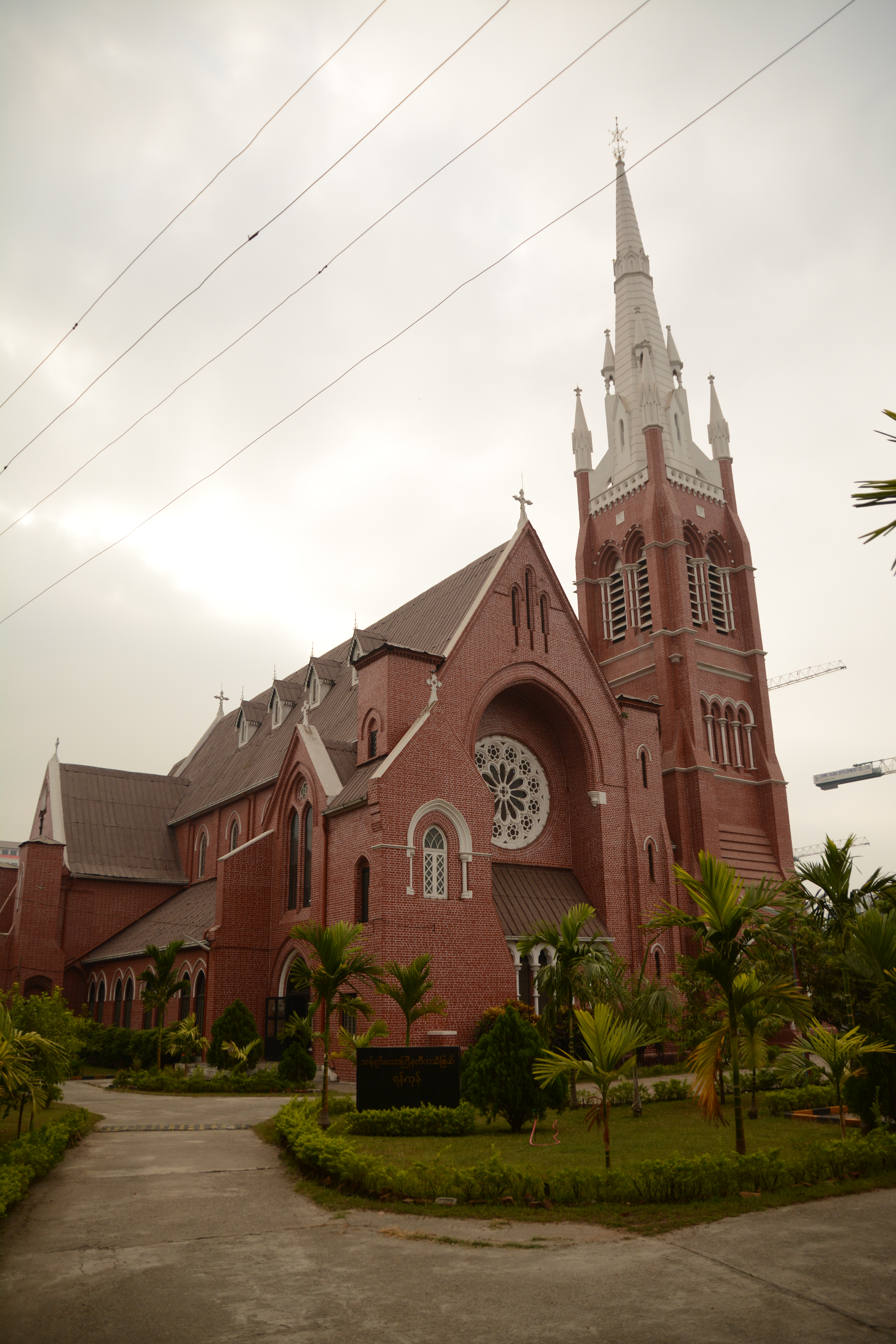
Holy Trinity Cathedral in 2015

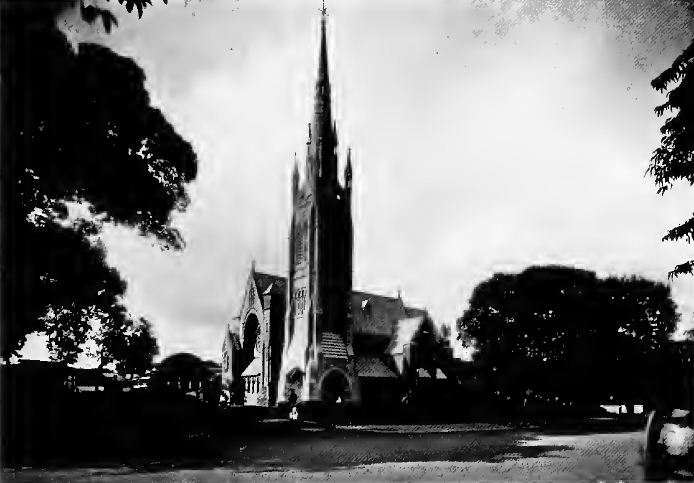
Holy Trinity Cathedral in 1890s

Holy Trinity Cathedral (Burmese: သန့်ရှင်းသော တြိနတိ ကသီဒြယ်, IPA: [θa̰ɰ̃ʃɪ́ɰ̃ ðɔ́ tɹḭnətḭ kəθìdɹɛ̀]) is the primary Anglican cathedral in Myanmar (Burma), located on Bogyoke Aung San Road (next to Bogyoke Aung San Market) in Latha Township, Yangon.

The cathedral was designed by Robert Chisholm, a Madras-based architect, in the Indo-Saracenic style to adapt to warm and humid conditions. Construction began in 1886, with the laying of the foundation stone by Lord Dufferin, the Viceroy of India, and was completed in 1894. The pipe organ was destroyed during the Second World War and could not be restored so an electric substitute organ was installed. The stained glass windows were repaired in 2003. The cathedral is listed on the Yangon City Heritage List. The cathedral is located next to a formerly associated missionary school, Basic Education High School No. 1 Pabedan (formerly Saint Mary's School).

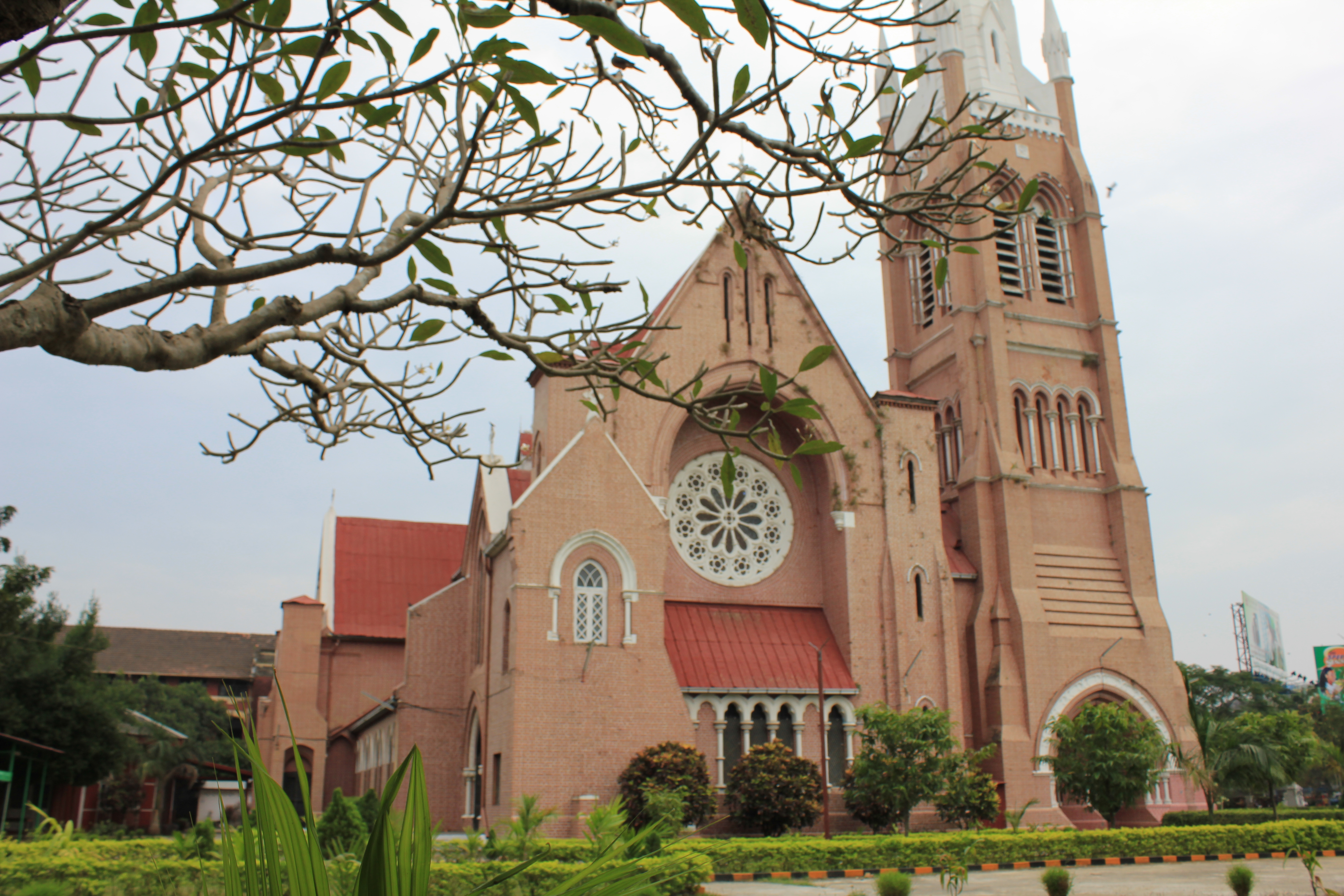
Cathedral Church, Yangon

The current Vicar/Dean, the Very Rev'd Reginald Bennett, is also on the faculty of Holy Cross Theological College, 104 Inya Laan, Yangon. The cathedral historically had strong connections with the British military regiments who were in occupation during the period of the British Empire. There are several wall tablatures in memoriam of the deaths of many young members of the military, although the well-kept surrounding gardens do not contain any burials.

== Monuments and memorials ==
The cathedral has a bronze plaque commemorating W.H. Jackson, an English missionary who developed and ran a school for blind boys in the city, from 1917 until his death in 1931.
