= Bengali Christians =

Group of Christians from the Bengal region

Bengali Christians বাঙালি খ্রিস্টান
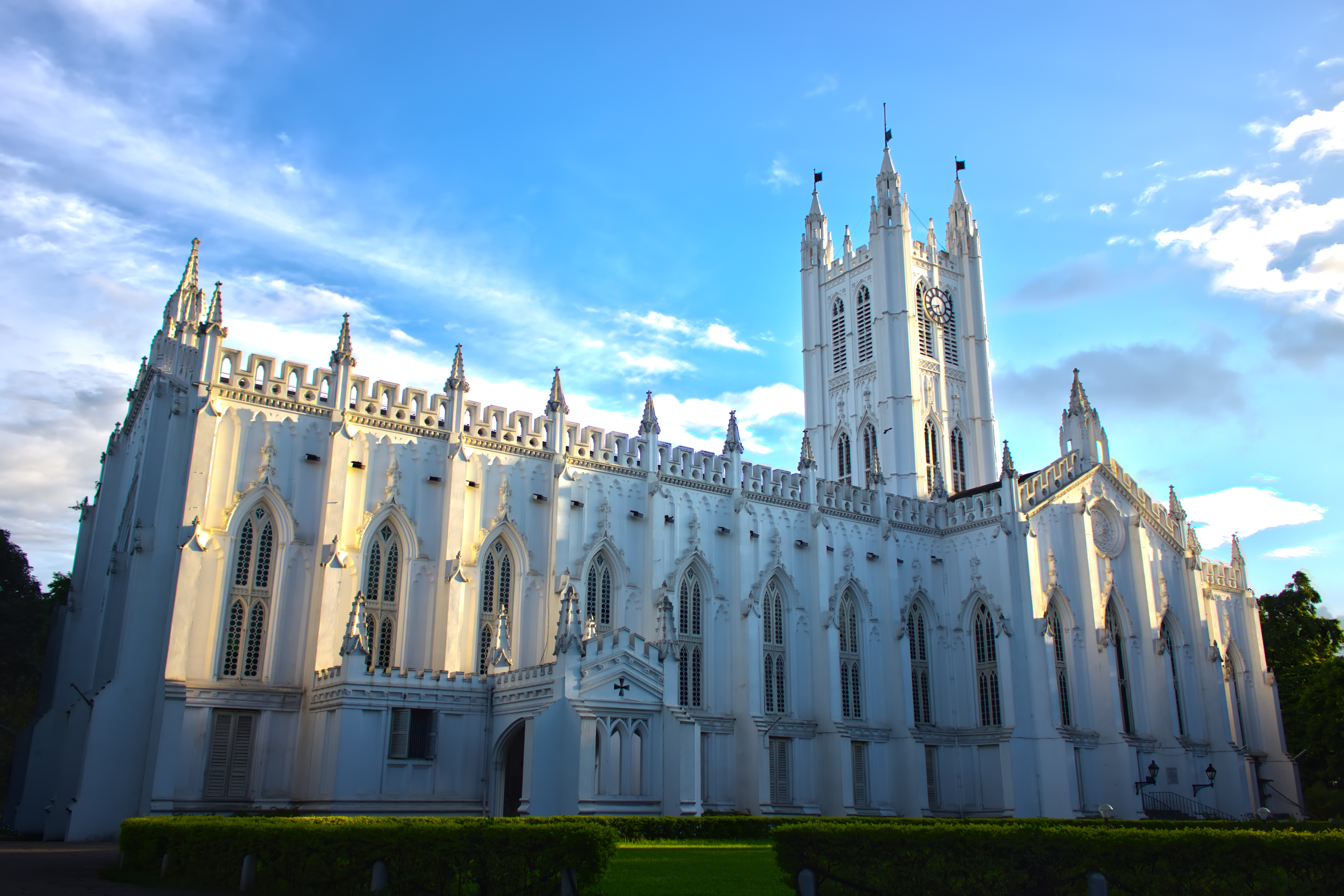
- North façade of the St. Paul's Cathedral, Calcutta

Total population
- 1,370,000

Regions with significant populations
- India: 730,000 (West Bengal)
- Bangladesh: 488,583

Religions
- Christianity (Catholicism, Protestantism, Indian Orthodox)

Languages
- Bengali

Related ethnic groups
- Bengalis, Bengali Muslims, Bengali Hindus

Bengali Christians (Bengali: বাঙালি খ্রিস্টান) are adherents of Christianity among the Bengali people. Christianity took root in Bengal after the arrival of Portuguese voyagers in the 16th century. It witnessed further conversions among the Bengali upper-caste elite during the 19th century Bengali Renaissance.

Bengali Christians played significant role in Bengali culture, education, commerce and society. Some of the most influential thinkers and advocates during the Indian independence struggle from British Raj were Bengali Christians. The region is home to missionary institutions, including the Missionaries of Charity founded by Mother Teresa.

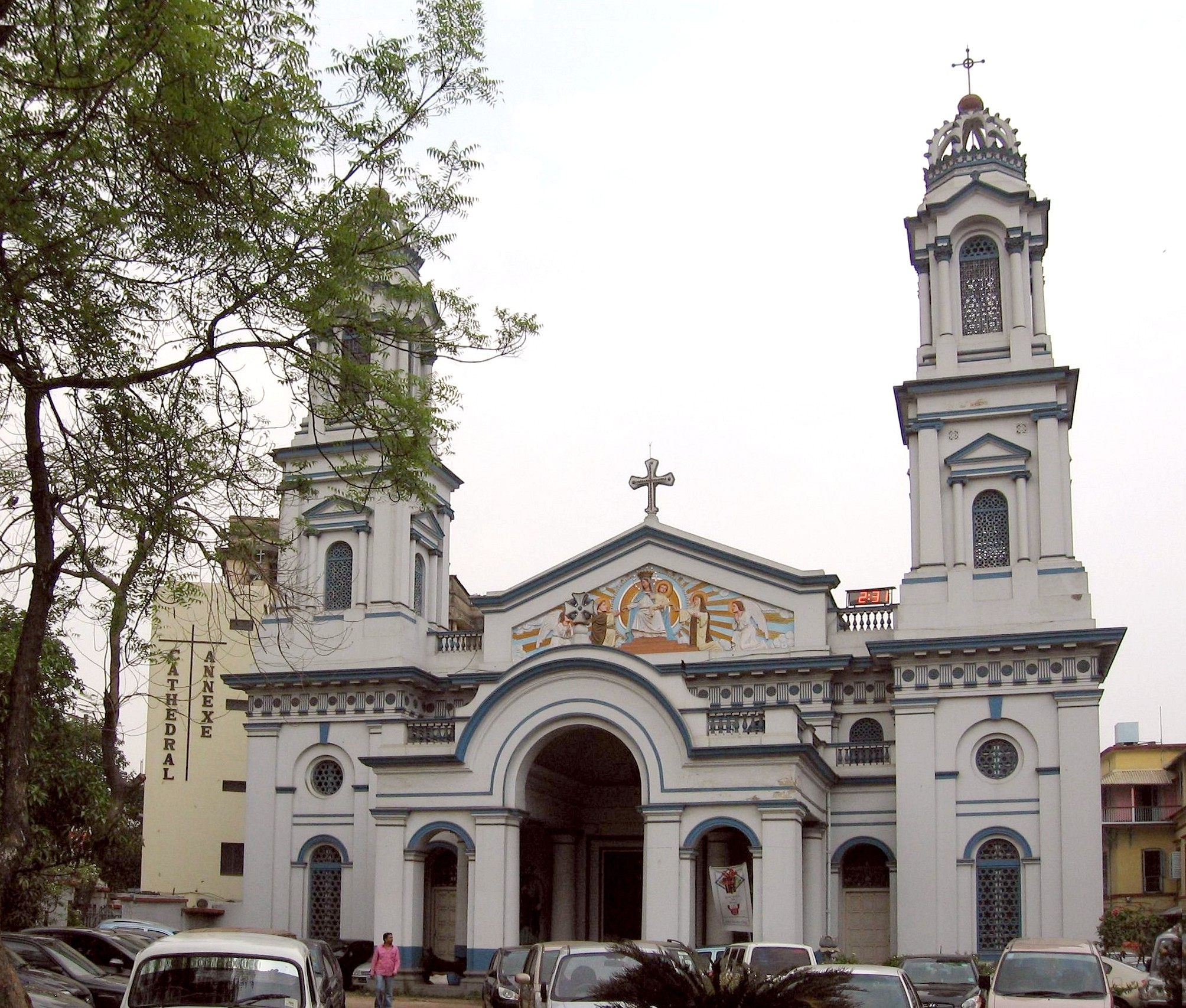
Archdiocese of Calcutta

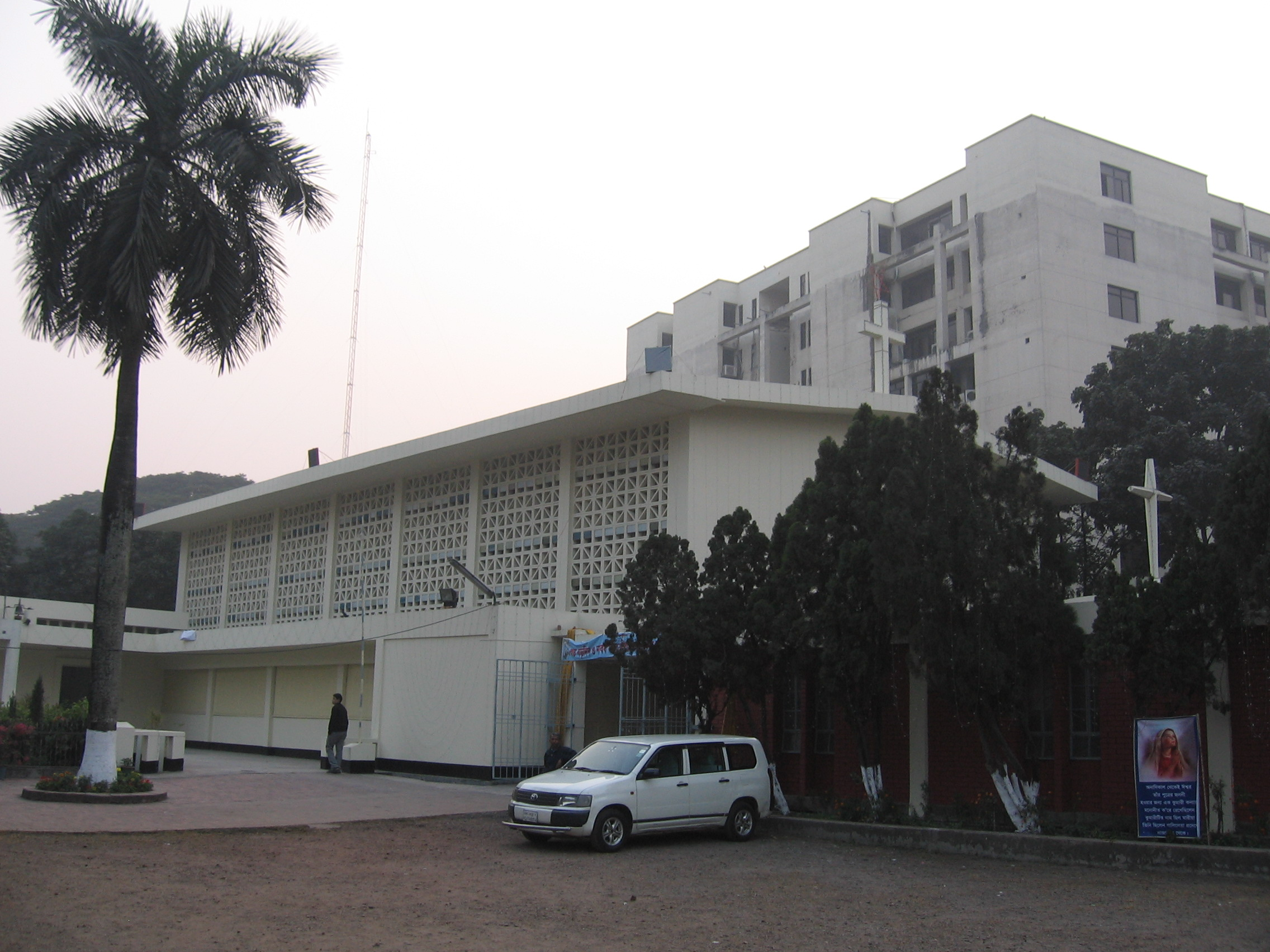
Roman Catholic Archdiocese of Dhaka

== History ==
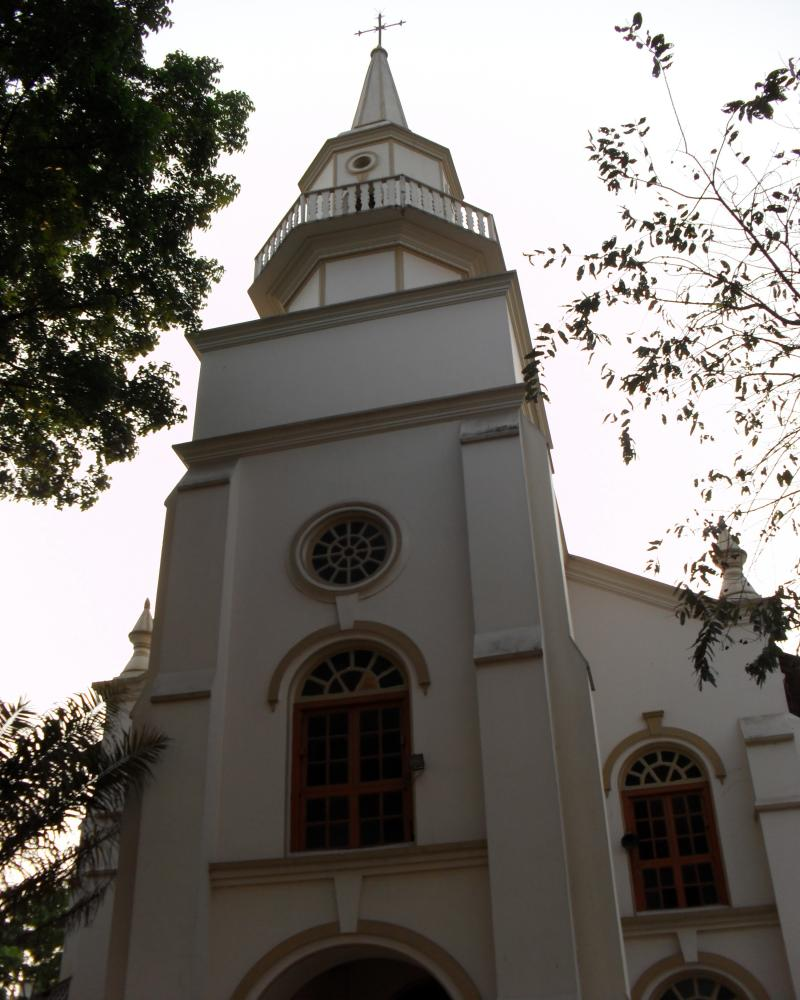
Roman Catholic Archdiocese of Chittagong

Christianity was established in Bengal by the Portuguese missionaries in the 16th century. Basilica of the Holy Rosary, Bandel is the first church known to have been constructed in 1599 at Hugli-Chuchura in the Hooghly district of West Bengal, India. Another is known to have been established from the historical records was in Ishwaripore, Jessore (erstwhile Chandecan) in 1600 under patronage of Pratapaditya which later was ransacked. Chittagong (erstwhile also referred to as Diang) with significant Portuguese and trading settlements had first hermitage and churches erected around this time. The Portuguese settlement in Chittagong hosted the first Vicar Apostolic in Bengal. The Portuguese from there moved to Arakan, where they would transport Hindu and Muslim slaves, about 42,000 in number from 1621 to 1624, and converted 28,000 of those enslaved peoples to Christianity. Jesuit missionaries also established churches in Bandel and Dhaka. In 1682, there were 14,120 Roman Catholics in Bengal.

== Denominations ==
=== Roman Catholic Church ===
The Catholic Church in Bangladesh is based in the Archdiocese of Dhaka, with dioceses in Dinajpur, Mymensingh, Sylhet and Rajshahi and Archdiocese of Chittagong, with dioceses in Barisal and Khulna.

- Province of Dhaka: Metropolitan Archdiocese of Dhaka
  - Diocese of Dinajpur
  - Diocese of Mymensingh
  - Diocese of Rajshahi
  - Diocese of Sylhet
- Province of Chittagong: Metropolitan Archdiocese of Chittagong
  - Diocese of Barisal
  - Diocese of Khulna

The Roman Catholic Church in West Bengal is based in the Archdiocese of Calcutta.

- Province of Calcutta: Metropolitan Archdiocese of Calcutta
  - Diocese of Asansol
  - Diocese of Bagdogra
  - Diocese of Baruipur
  - Diocese of Darjeeling
  - Diocese of Jalpaiguri
  - Diocese of Krishnagar
  - Diocese of Raiganj

=== United Protestantism ===
In the Indian subcontinent, various Protestant denominations merged to form United Protestant Churches, such as the Church of North India and the Church of Bangladesh.

Bangladesh:

St. Thomas Cathedral is the seat of the Metropolitan Diocese of Dhaka of Archbishop of Church of Bangladesh. There are three dioceses of the United Protestant Church of Bangladesh:

- Church of Bangladesh Diocese of Dhaka
- Church of Bangladesh Diocese of Kushtia
- Church of Bangladesh Diocese of Barisal

India (West Bengal):

St. Paul's Cathedral, Kolkata is the seat of the Diocese of Calcutta (1813) of the United Protestant Church of North India (CNI).

- Diocese of Barrackpore
- Diocese of Durgapur
- Diocese of Calcutta

=== Other denominations ===
Other denominations include:

- Assemblies of God in India
- India Pentecostal Church of God
- The Pentecostal Mission
- Armenian Apostolic Church
- Bengal Orissa Bihar Baptist Convention
- Brethren in Christ Church
- Church of God (Anderson)
- El Shaddai
- New Life Fellowship Association
- Bangladesh Baptist Church Sangha (BBCS)
- Isa-e Church (Bangladesh)
- Bangladesh Evangelical Church (BEC)

== Demographics ==
Bengali Christians are considered a model minority in South Asia and usually enjoy a high literacy rate, low male-female sex ratio and a better socio-economic status. Christian missionaries operate many schools, hospitals and shelters for the poor. They receive support from the Indian and Bangladeshi governments.

Dhaka, Chittagong, Barisal, Khulna and Northern District Side have significant Christian populations.

== Culture ==
=== Lusophone heritage ===
Some Catholic Bengali Christians have Portuguese surnames. In a tradition similar to Bengali Muslims (who have Arabic and Persian names), Bengali Christians adopted Portuguese surnames due to the early influence of Portuguese missionaries in spreading Christianity. Common Catholic Bengali Christian surnames include Gomes, Rozario, D'Costa, Gonsalvez, Cruze, Dias, D'Silva and D'Souza among others.

Christmas is known as "Boro Din" (Big Day) and is a public holiday in both Bangladesh and Indian West Bengal.

== Notable Bengali Christians ==
- Aurobindo Nath Mukherjee
- Krishna Mohan Banerjee, Educationist, linguist and Bengali Christian missionary, First President of the Bengal Christian Association.
- Lal Behari Dey, Bengali Christian Missionary, writer and journalist
- Ram Chandra Bose, Educator, evangelist, and writer.
- Kali Charan Chatterjee, Bengali Christian Missionary and first moderator of the Presbyterian Church in India.
- Kali Charan Banerjee, Lawyer, Indian independence movement activist and founding member of the Indian National Congress.
- Brahmabandhav Upadhyay, Bengali theologian, journalist and freedom fighter in the Indian independence movement
- Lolita Roy, social reformer and suffragist in the British suffragist movement

=== Religious leaders ===
- Rev. Nirod Biswas, first Indian Anglican Bishop of Assam
- Cardinal Patrick D'Rozario
- Michael Rosario, Archbishop
- Rt. Rev Shourabh Pholia, Bishop of Barishal Diocese
- Theotonius Amal Ganguly, former Bishop of Dhaka

=== Freedom Fighters ===
- Kali Charan Banerjee

=== Arts ===
- Michael Madhusudan Dutt, 19th century poet and playwright
- Toru Dutt, poet
- Badal Sircar, noted Bengali playwright and dramatist.
- Samar Das, musician
- Debabrata Biswas, musician
- Andrew Kishore, Bangladeshi playback singer
- Robin Ghosh, Bangladeshi playback singer and film music composer
- Tony Dias, Bangladeshi television actor and director
- George Lincoln D'Costa, Bangladeshi Metal Singer

=== Industry ===
- Samson Chowdhury, founder of Square Pharmaceuticals, Bangladesh
- Tapan Chowdhury, Bangladesh
- Anjan Chowdhury, Bangladesh

=== Scholars ===
- Chandramukhi Basu, first female graduate of British India
- Radhanath Sikdar, Indian mathematician
- Ashis Nandy, Indian sociologist
- Sukumari Bhattacharji, Indologist

=== Educators ===
- Mona Hensman, née Mitter, former principal, Ethiraj College for Women, Chennai
- Surendra Kumar Datta, former principal, Forman Christian College, Lahore, Pakistan.
- S. K. Rudra, first Indian principal of St. Stephen's College, Delhi

=== Politicians ===
- Harendra Coomar Mookerjee, first Governor of West Bengal and member of constituent assembly.
- Hubert Costa, Bangladeshi-Polish Member of Parliament
- Promode Mankin, first Catholic and first member of the country's among Christian community to become a government minister in Bangladesh (as a member of the Bangladesh Awami League) and formerly representing Mymensingh-1 (constituency) (whom his son became his successor).
- Jewel Areng, son of Promode Mankin. He is the youngest member of parliament (as a member of the Bangladesh Awami League) and the only Catholic, currently representing Mymensingh-1 (constituency) (whom his father was also his predecessor).
- Gloria Jharna Sarker, Bangladesh's first Christian Woman MP (2019)

=== Bangladesh Army ===
- Brigadier John Gomes

=== Indian Defence Services ===
- Lionel Protip Sen, General in the Indian Army

=== Sports ===
- Sudhir Kumar Chatterjee, Indian footballer
- Paresh Lal Roy, Indian boxer
- Hemanta Vincent Biswas, Bangladesh national team footballer

== See also ==
- Christianity in Bangladesh
- Christianity in West Bengal
