= Christianity in West Bengal =

Overview of the history of Christianity in the Indian state of West Bengal

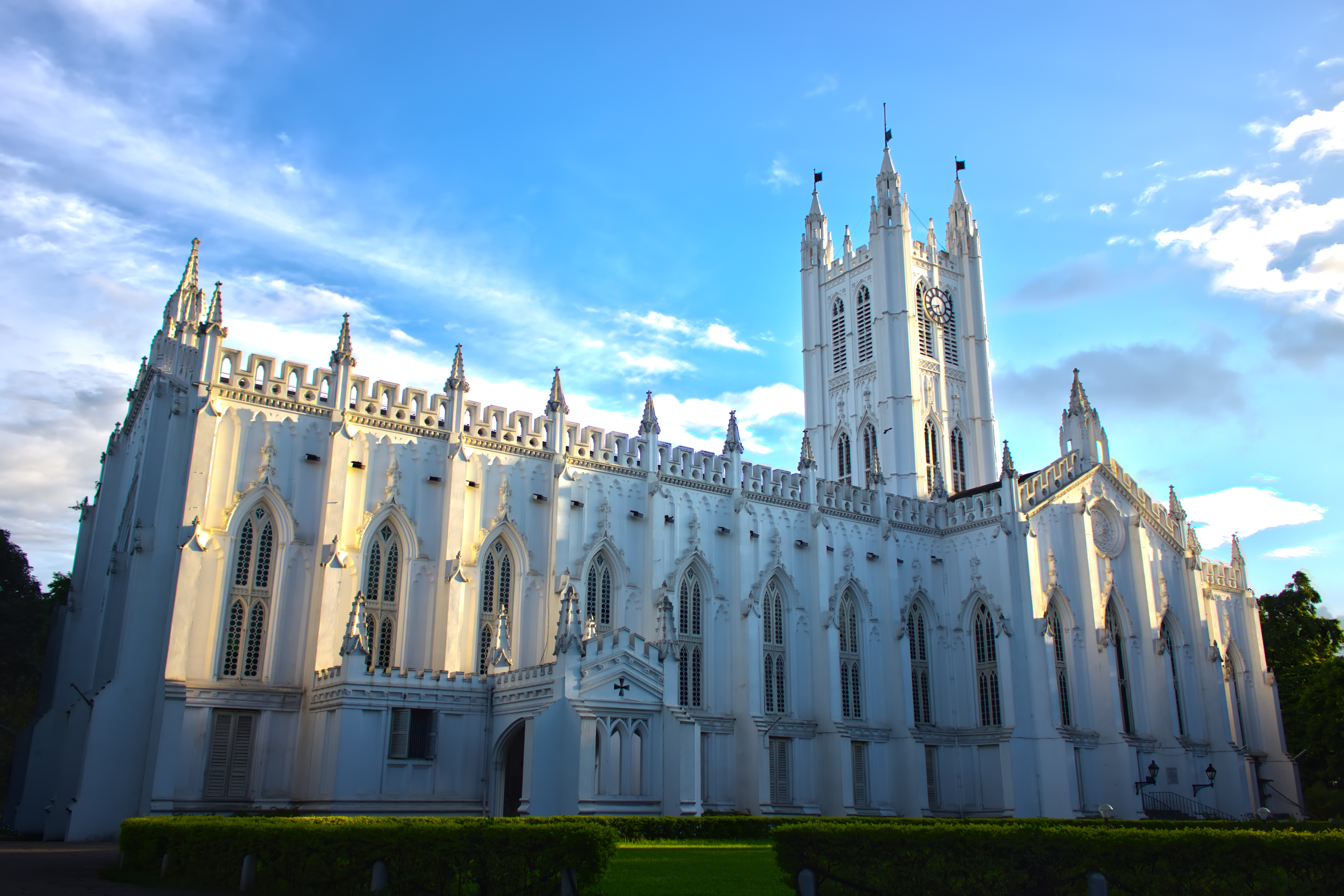
St. Paul's Cathedral – seat of the Diocese of Calcutta, Church of North India

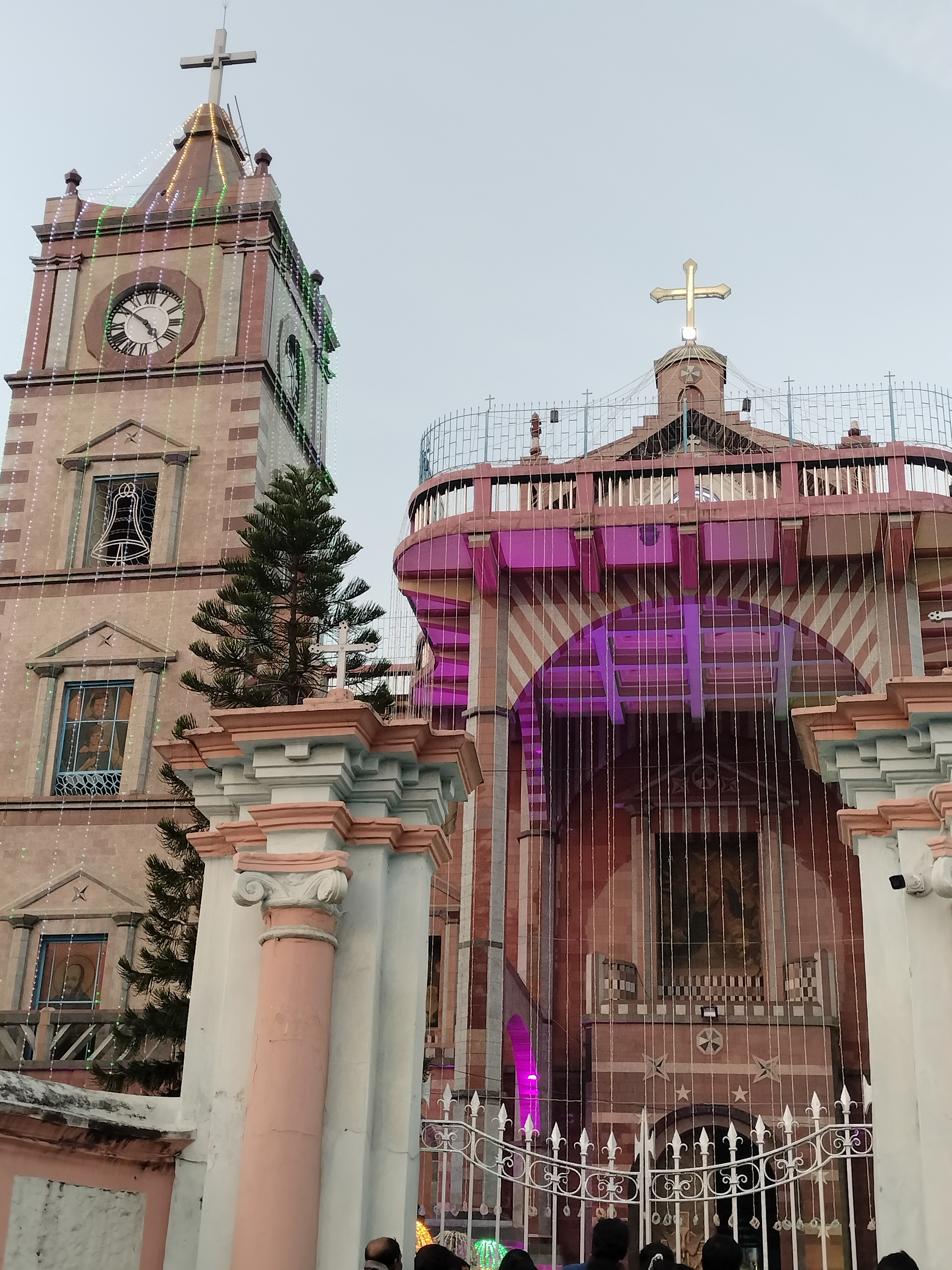
The Bandel Church, rebuilt in 1660 on the site of an older 1599 church.

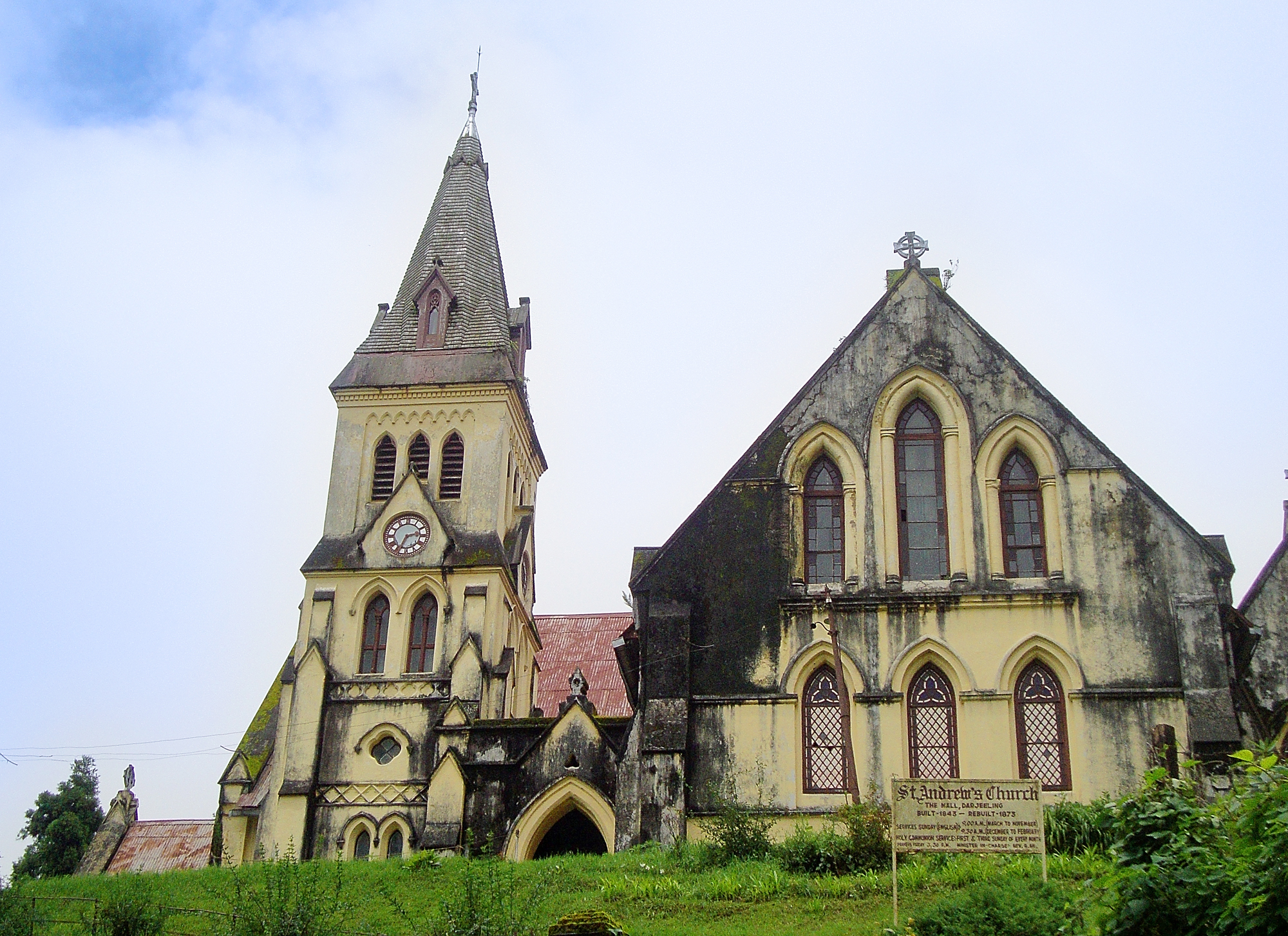
St. Andrew's Church, Darjeeling. Built: 1843, Rebuilt: 1873

Christianity in West Bengal, India, is a minority religion. According to the 2011 census of India, there were 658,618 Christians in West Bengal, or 0.72% of the population. Although Mother Teresa worked in Kolkata (Calcutta), Christianity is a minority religion in Kolkata as well. West Bengal has the highest number of Bengali Christians. Bengali Christians have been established since the 16th century with the advent of the Portuguese in Bengal. Later in the 19th and 20th centuries, many upper-class Bengalis converted to Christianity during the Bengali Renaissance under British rule, including Krishna Mohan Banerjee, Michael Madhusudan Dutt, Anil Kumar Gain, and Gnanendramohan Tagore. Aurobindo Nath Mukherjee was the first Indian to be Anglican Bishop of Calcutta.

Bengali Christians have the highest literacy rate, the lowest male-female sex ratio, along with better socio-economic status. Christian missionaries run major social institutions dealing with education and healthcare, such as those run by the Jesuit Catholics, and the dominant Protestant Church of North India (CNI), & some Christian Revival Church also serving.

== History ==
Christianity has been present in Bengal since the 16th century. The Portuguese established a settlement in Bandel, Hooghly district in the 16th century, and Bandel Church, perhaps the first church in West Bengal, was built in 1599. Burnt down during the sacking of Hooghly in 1632, the church was rebuilt in 1660. The followers of Christianity mainly settled in Barddhmann, Bankura, Kolkata and Hooghly district of West Bengal. Many Bengali Catholics have Portuguese surnames.

British missionary William Carey, who founded the Baptist Missionary Society, travelled to India in 1793 and worked as a missionary in the Danish colony of Serampore, because of opposition from the East India Company to his activities in their regions. He translated the Bible into Bengali (completed 1809) and Sanskrit (completed 1818). His first Bengali convert was Krishna Pal, who renounced his caste after conversion. In 1818, the first theological college in Bengal, Serampore College, was founded.

== Denominations ==
St. Paul's Cathedral, Kolkata is the seat of the Anglican Diocese of Calcutta (1813) of the Church of North India. The Roman Catholic ecclesiastical province which has its seat in the Cathedral of the Most Holy Rosary is the Roman Catholic Archdiocese of Calcutta (1834).

Other denominations include:

- Assemblies of God in India
- India Pentecostal Church of God
- Armenian Apostolic Church
- Bethel Apostolic Assemblies(IBAA) India
- Bengal Orissa Bihar Baptist Convention
- Brethren in Christ Church in India
- Church of God (Anderson)
- Council of Baptist Churches in Northern India
- El Shaddai
- New Life Fellowship Association
- United Missionary Church of India
- Christian Revival Church (CRC)
- The Pentecostal Mission (TPM)

== Population ==
Historical Christian Population in West Bengal
Year	Pop.	±%
1951	181,775	—
1961	204,530	+12.5%
1971	251,782	+23.1%
1981	319,670	+27.0%
1991	383,477	+20.0%
2001	515,150	+34.3%
2011	658,618	+27.8%

Christians in West Bengal
Year	Number	Percentage
2001	515,150	0.64
2011	658,618	0.72

Christians in West Bengal by district (2011)
#	District	Total population	Christian population	%
1	Jalpaiguri	3,872,846	186,279	4.81%
2	Darjiling	1,846,823	141,848	7.68%
3	South 24 Parganas	8,161,961	66,498	0.81%
4	Kolkata	4,496,694	39,758	0.88%
5	Nadia	5,167,600	33,835	0.65%
6	North 24 Parganas	10,009,781	26,933	0.27%
7	Dakshin Dinajpur	1,676,276	24,794	1.48%
8	Paschim Medinipur	5,913,457	23,287	0.39%
9	Barddhaman	7,717,563	21,220	0.27%
10	Murshidabad	7,103,807	18,102	0.25%
11	Uttar Dinajpur	3,007,134	16,702	0.56%
12	Maldah	3,988,845	13,209	0.33%
13	Birbhum	3,502,404	10,906	0.31%
14	Haora	4,850,029	8,666	0.18%
15	Puruliya	2,930,115	8,646	0.30%
16	Hugli	5,519,145	7,300	0.13%
17	Koch Bihar	2,819,086	4,122	0.15%
18	Bankura	3,596,674	3,865	0.11%
19	Purba Medinipur	5,095,875	2,648	0.05%
	West Bengal (Total)	91,276,115	658,618	0.72%

Trends in Christian population of West Bengal
Census year	% of total population
1951	0.70%
1961	0.59%
1971	0.57%
1981	0.59%
1991	0.60%
2001	0.64%
2011	0.72%

== Notable Institutions ==
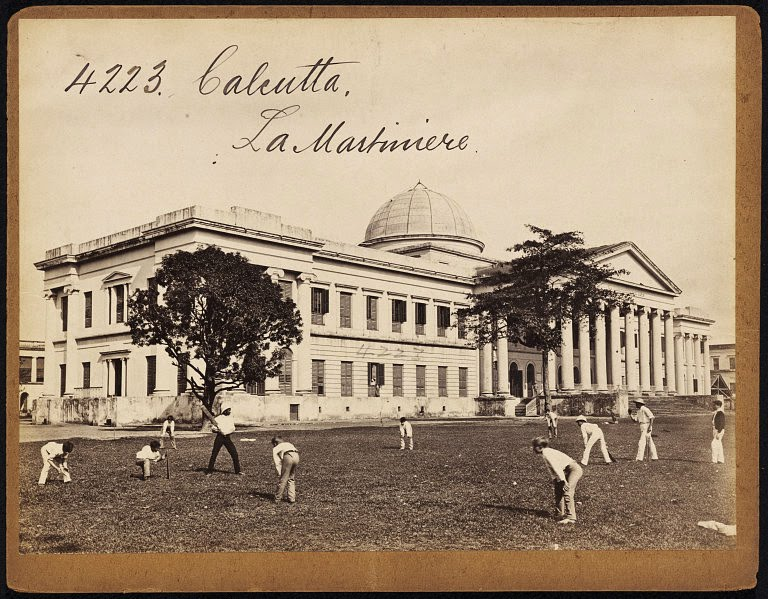
La Martinière Calcutta, one of India's most prestigious schools, is run by the Protestant Church of North India

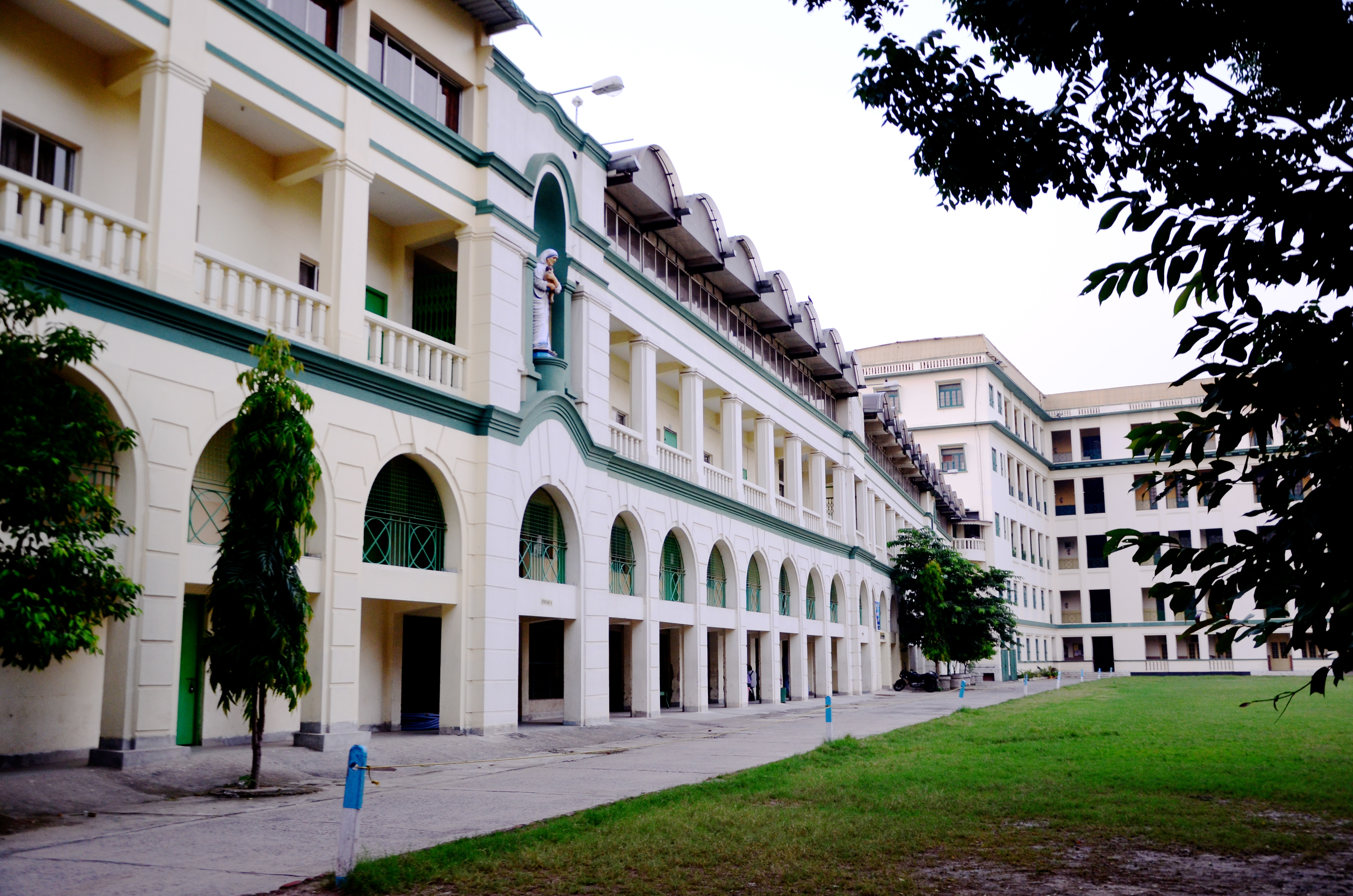
St. Xavier's College, Kolkata, run by the catholic Jesuits, is one of India's best colleges

=== Schools ===
- Armenian College and Philanthropic Academy (Armenian Apostolic Church and Orthodox)
- Assembly of God Church School (Pentecostal and Protestant)
- Calcutta Boys School ( Thoburn Methodist church)
- Calcutta Girls High School ( Thoburn Methodist church)
- Don Bosco High & Technical School, Liluah (Salesian and Catholic)
- Don Bosco School, Park Circus (Salesian and Catholic)
- Don Bosco School, Bandel (Salesian and Catholic)
- La Martiniere Calcutta (Church of North India and Protestant)
- Loreto Schools, Kolkata (Catholic)
- Scottish Church Collegiate School (Church of North India and Protestant)
- St. James' School (Church of North India and Protestant)
- St. John's Diocesan Girls' Higher Secondary School (Church of North India and Protestant)
- St. Lawrence High School, Kolkata (Jesuit and Catholic)
- St. Teresa’s Secondary School, Kolkata (Roman Catholic)
- St Thomas School, Kolkata (Church of North India and Protestant)
- St. Xavier's Collegiate School (Jesuit and Catholic)
- The Frank Anthony Public School, Kolkata (Non-denominational and Protestant)

=== Colleges and Universities ===
- Loreto College, Kolkata (Catholic)
- Scottish Church College (Church of North India and Protestant)
- Senate of Serampore College (University) (Non-denominational and Protestant)
- Serampore College (Non-denominational and Protestant)
- South Asia Theological Research Institute (Non-denominational and Protestant)
- St. Paul's Cathedral Mission College (Church of North India and Protestant)
- St. Thomas' College of Engineering and Technology (Church of North India and Protestant)
- St. Xavier's College, Kolkata (Jesuit and Catholic)
- Women's Christian College, Kolkata (Non-denominational and Protestant)

== Notable people ==
- Mother Teresa
- Henry Derozio, poet
- Brahmabandhav Upadhyay, theologian
- Badal Sircar, noted Bengali playwright and dramatist.
- Neil O'Brien
- Leander Paes
- Leslie Claudius
- Derek O'Brien
- Michael Madhusudan Dutt
- Toru Dutt
- Kali Charan Banerjee
- Krishna Mohan Banerjee
- Harendra Coomar Mookerjee
- John Sharat Chandra Banerjee
- Sukumari Bhattacharji, Indologist
- Lionel Protip Sen, General in the Indian Army
- K. P. Aleaz, theologian and retired Professor, Bishop's College
- Bonita Aleaz, political scientist
- Enrico Piperno, tennis player(1982 Asian Games), India's former Davis Cup and Fed Cup coach.
- Joy Govinda Shome, theologian and founder of Calcutta Christo Samaj in 1887.
- Lisa Nandy, is of Bengali descent is the Secretary of State for Culture, Media and Sport in Government of the United Kingdom, Labour MP for Wigan

== See also ==
- List of Christian denominations in North East India
- Christian Revival Church
