= Edward Nirmal Mangat Rai =

Punjabi Indian diplomat (1915–2003)

Chief Secretary of East Punjab Chief Secretary of Jammu and Kashmir Special Secretary in the Ministry of Petroleum

Personal details
- Born: 30 March 1915
- Died: 2003 (aged 87–88)
- Spouse: Nayantara Sahgal (m. 1979)

Edward Nirmal Mangat Rai (30 March 1915 – 2003) was a Punjabi Indian Christian diplomat who served as the Chief Secretary of East Punjab from 1957 to 1962 and the Chief Secretary of Jammu and Kashmir from 1964 to 1966, among holding other government positions in colonial India and independent India. Receiving an education in both India and England, Edward Nirmal Mangat Rai was a member of the Indian Civil Service. During his tenure as the Chief Secretary of East Punjab, Edward Nirmal Mangat Rai was instrumental in designing the city of Chandigarh.

== Early life and education ==
Edward Nirmal Mangat Rai was born on 30 March 1915 to Dora Chatterjee and Rai Sahib Mangat Rai, with his family hailing from Multan, Punjab, colonial India. The Mangat Rais settled in Abbottabad, North-West Frontier Province, colonial India. Edward Nirmal Mangat Rai belonged to a Punjabi family of the Khatri caste who adhered to the Christian religion. Edward Nirmal Mangat Rai's maternal grandfather Kali Charan Chatterji was a Bengali Christian of the Brahmin caste. His siblings included Charles Rajinder Mangat Rai, who later served as a Brigadier in the Indian Army, Priobala Mangat Rai, who served as the principal of Kinnaird College in Lahore, and Leena Sushiela, who married Arthur Lall, a Punjabi Christian who belonged to the Indian Civil Service and represented India at the United Nations. In Abbottabad, Edward Nirmal Mangat Rai was educated at the District Board School. After a brief and unsatisfactory time at the Prince of Wales Royal Indian Military College in Dehra Dun. He subsequently studied between 1930 and 1936 in St. Stephen's College in Delhi, where he earned a B.A. Honours and an M.A. in History. He was academically astute and "carried away just about every academic prize in his class", according to his classmate and renowned diplomat Khushwant Singh.

In 1936 Mangat Rai secured admission to Keble College, Oxford . In London the following year he sat the examination for the Indian Civil Service which he passed . He was second on the Indian list. He took the mandatory year's ICS training at Oxford, foregoing the chance to finish his Oxford B.A.

== Career ==
Edward Nirmal Mangat Rai returned to India in October, 1938. In the Punjab Province of British India, Edward Nirmal Mangat Rai served in various government roles, including being the director of the Civil Supplies Department by 1947. At the time of the partition of India in 1947, Edward Nirmal Mangat Rai opted for independent India, stating: "For a Christian, the choice between Pakistan and India was genuine, for he did not, by virtue of his religious label fall automatically within one fold or another. … Yet, as it was inevitable, when the choice was put to us in the form of either/or, many of us debated and considered an assessment of the future shape of things. … I myself had no doubt whatever that I would opt for India, and not for Pakistan."

In East Punjab in independent India, Edward Nirmal Mangat Rai served as the Finance Secretary and later, the Planning and Development Commissioner. He served as the Chief Secretary of East Punjab from 1957 to 1962 and during his tenure, Edward Nirmal Mangat Rai, along with Partap Singh Kairon, was instrumental in designing the city of Chandigarh.

From 1964 to 1966, Edward Nirmal Mangat Rai served as the Chief Secretary of Jammu and Kashmir under the leadership of Ghulam Mohammed Sadiq.

He subsequently served as the Special Secretary in the Ministry of Petroleum at Delhi.

Edward Nirmal Mangat Rai died in 2003.
