= BBCF =

BBCF or variation, may refer to:

- BlazBlue: Central Fiction, a 2016 videogame
- Bible Bhavan Christian Fellowship, a church in New Delhi built in 1966 for Indian Christians
- BBC First, a television brand, operating internationally, and localized in several countries
- Bangladesh Baptist Church Fellowship, for Bengali Christians
- 믏 (U+BBCF), a Hangul character; see List of modern Hangul characters in ISO/IEC 2022–compliant national character set standards
