= Kali Charan Chatterjee =

Indian Christian theologian

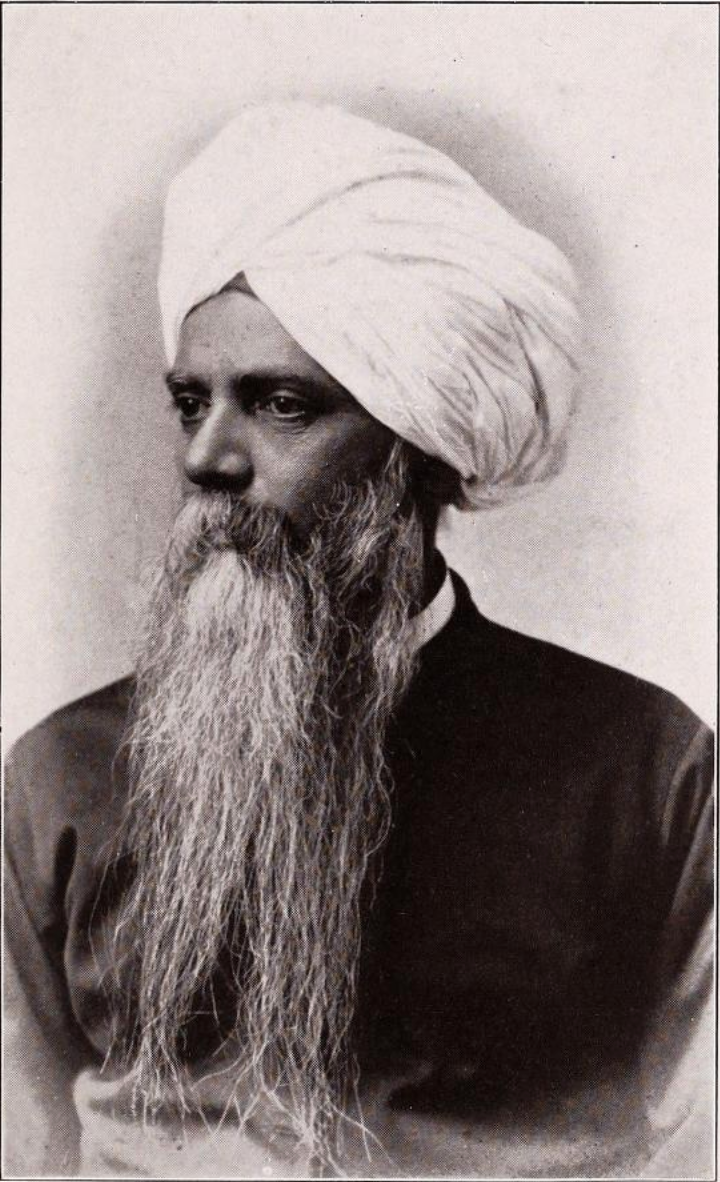
Kali Charan Chatterjee while on visit to the USA in 1887

Kali Charan Chatterjee D. D. (1839–1916), also spelt as Kali Charan Chatterji or K.C. Chatterjea, was a Bengali Christian missionary who worked with the American Presbyterian Mission in Hoshiarpur, Punjab and served as the first moderator of the Presbyterian Church in India upon its formation in 1904.

== Early life ==
Chatterjee was born to a Bengali Kulin Brahmin family at Sukchar, a village along the Hooghly River about twenty kilometers north of Calcutta. The recitation of Sanskrit scriptures was commonplace in his home and Chatterjee learned to memorize passages of sacred texts from a young age. When he was five, he entered a primary school where he learned to read Sanskrit. At age eight, he received the sacred thread as the rite of passage that every Brahmin boy receives.

== Education and Conversion ==
After primary school, Chatterjee was enrolled in an English-medium high school operated by the Church Missionary Society in a nearby village where he studied under a Bengali Christian headmaster, Babu Guru Charan Bose, and first encountered the Christian faith. Chatterjee began to meet with a group of classmates to compare the teachings of the Bible with that of the Sanskrit scriptures and slowly he became drawn towards faith in Jesus Christ. After he and a few other students decided to become Christians, they travelled into Calcutta to apply for entry into the Christian mission college operated by the Free Church of Scotland under principal Alexander Duff. At the time, Chatterjee and his friends were still unbaptized and had not told their families of their desire to become Christians. Even though Chatterjee wished to enter the Scottish institution for its Christian environment, his father agreed to the transfer due to the prestigious reputation of Duff's college as an academic institution. Soon after entering Duff's college in 1854, Chatterjee was baptized on the 8th of November by Rev. Dr. David Ewart of the Free Church of Scotland.

Chatterjee studied at the Free Church institution during a tumultuous time in India. The Indian Uprising of 1857 occurred at this time, drawing sharper distinctions between Indian Christians and other religious communities and causing some Indian Christians to reflect more thoroughly on their relationship with Western missionaries. Also, in 1855 a dispute arose within the Free Church mission establishment when a group of its Indian missionaries who were recently ordained applied to join the Mission Council, the main executive arm of the Free Church's mission activities in Bengal. All incoming Scottish missionaries were automatically accepted to the Council but Indian missionaries were not permitted to join. One of the three ordinands who protested this policy was Lal Behari Day with whom Chatterjee became close. The 1855 dispute along with the Uprising of 1857 caused Day to lament, “It is a fact… that the relation subsisting between Missionaries and Native Christians is not of a very satisfactory character.” These events influenced Chatterjee and other classmates such as Kali Charan Banerjee to seek greater equality with Western missionaries and to advocate for more intensive sociability between Indian Christians and British and American missionaries, arguing that more contact would enhance understanding.

== Missionary career ==
In 1861, Chatterjee was invited to join the American Presbyterian Mission at Jalandhar, Punjab as headmaster of the mission school. Here he became a close friend and colleague of Golaknath, one of the first Indian ordained missionaries with the American Presbyterians and Chatterjee's future father-in-law. After three years at Jalandhar, Chatterjee would spend 1865-1868 at the institution that would become Forman Christian College in Lahore.

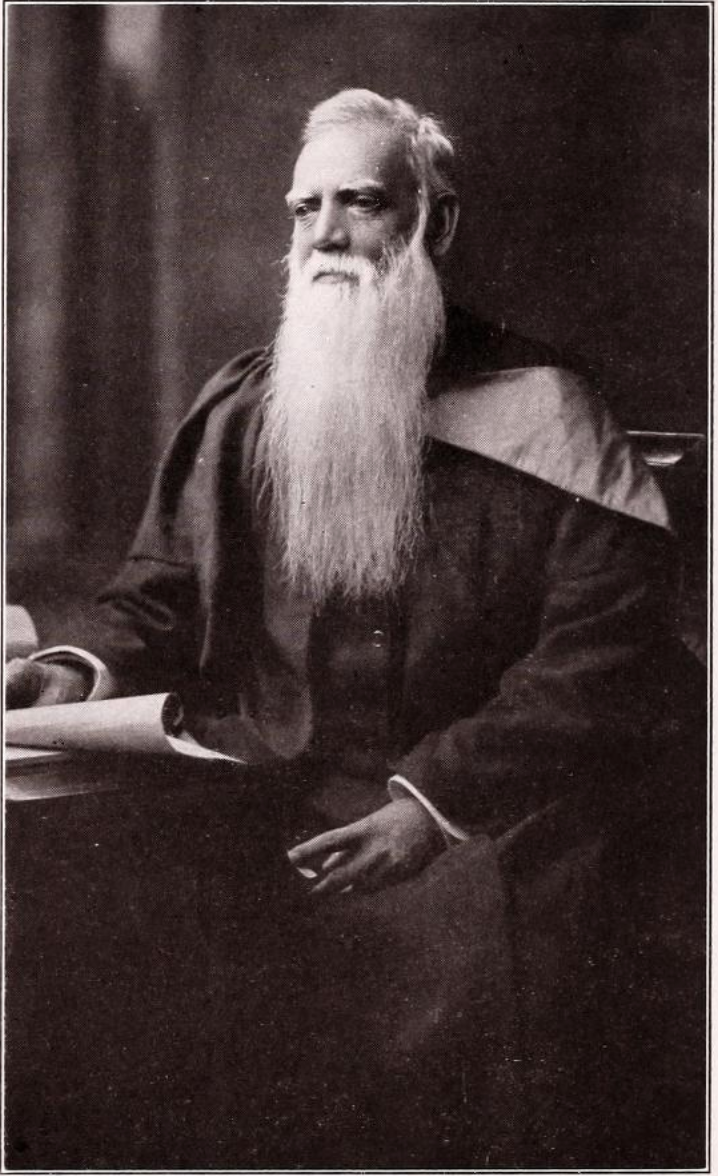
Rev. Kali Charan Chatterjee, D. D., in Edinburgh, 1910

Once Chatterjee was licensed to preach in 1867 and formally ordained to the Presbytery of Ludhiana (PCUS) in 1868, he was given sole charge of a new mission station at Hoshiarpur in 1868. Chatterjee established a school and an orphanage in Hoshiarpur, both becoming instrumental in the education and social advancement of women and the low-castes.

However, while education was a consistent feature of Chatterjee's missionary activities, his primary concern was evangelism. During the 1880's and 90's, large numbers of rural low-caste men and women in Punjab converted to Christian faith and Chatterjee was one of the main evangelists in the midst of these so-called "mass movements." This rapid increase in church membership among poor social outcastes coincided with a growing appeal within Protestant missions for the pursuit of "indigenous" churches which are independent of missionary support, an ideal popularly expressed in the three-self model: self-supporting, self-governing, and self-propagating. In light of his church context among poor social outcastes, Chatterjee engaged the three-self ideal by encouraging missionaries to be patient and cautious in removing support for native churches. He argued for a cooperation approach in which missionaries provide "secular" support in the form of employment opportunities and education and thereby enabling converts to improve their socio-economic standing and eventually develop self-supported churches.

Eventually, Chatterjee would come to see church union as the best way forward for developing churches that reflect the three-self ideal. In December 1904, most of the Presbyterian bodies in India officially united to form the Presbyterian Church in India, and Chatterjee was elected its first moderator. However, Chatterjee continued to observe inequality between Western missionaries and Indian ministers in the operations of the new church and others shared his criticisms well into the early twentieth century.

Chatterjee was also involved in cooperation across denominational lines. In December 1905, he was selected as a vice-president of the newly formed National Missionary Society of India, one of the first Indian-led missionary societies. In 1910, Chatterjee was one of the few Asian attendees at the World Missionary Conference in Edinburgh. During his visit, the University of Edinburgh awarded him an honorary Doctor of Divinity.

Chatterjee's theology was Reformed in the Old Princeton fashion and he was a critic of Protestant liberalism. In one letter to the PCUS mission secretary Robert Speer, Chatterjee lamented the growing tendency among some theologians to diminish the doctrine of the atonement: "It is with considerable sorrow that I have heard evangelical teachers and read evangelical writers keeping the doctrine of atonement by the vicarious death of Christ in the background and putting the greatest emphasis on his teaching and example. I have also noticed young civilians coming out from Oxford and Cambridge to govern the country – almost all of them imbibed with this Unitarian Theology. I cannot make up my mind for it. I became Christian and openly professed my faith in Christ fifty-four years ago for this precious truth, and it has been the grace of my life ever since. It is the differentiating line between Christianity and all non-Christian systems, and we must not keep it in the background and much less give it up."

== Family ==
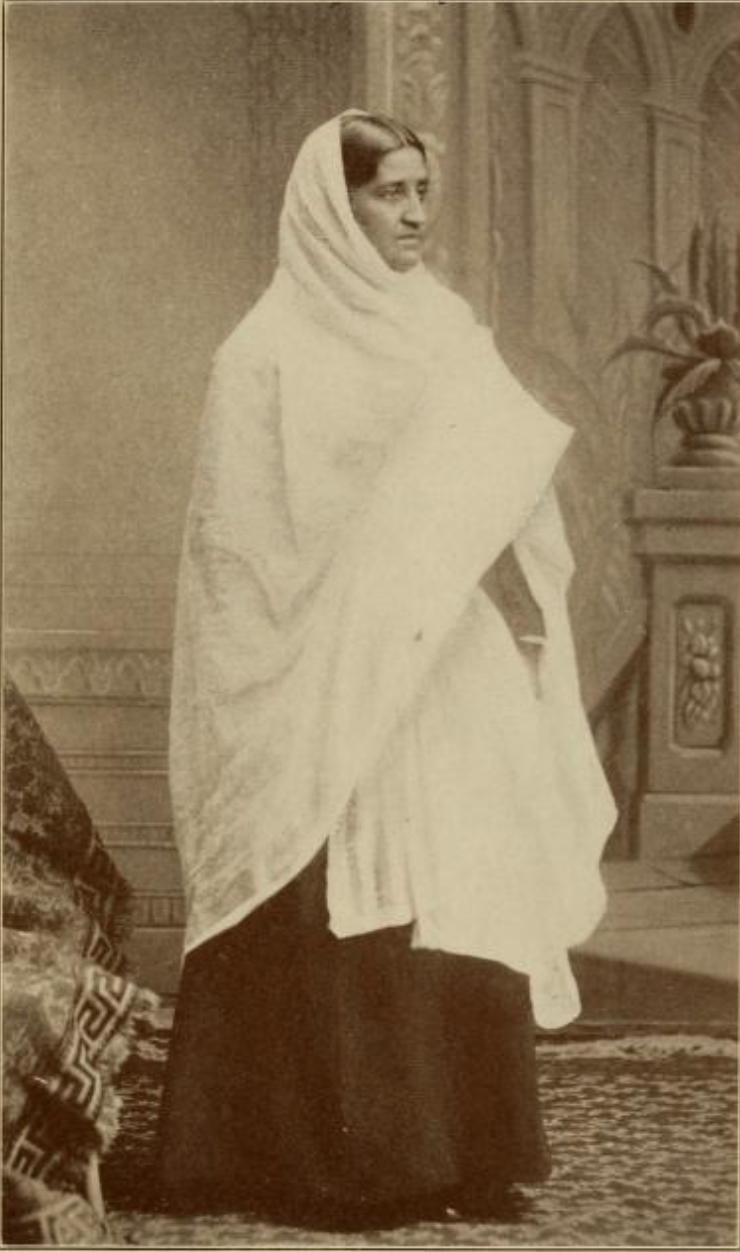
Mrs. Chatterjee in 1887

Chatterjee married the daughter of his former colleague at the Jalandhar mission, Golaknath. Mrs. Chatterjee, whose first name is lost in the primary sources, became a highly proficient teacher in the mission school at Hoshiarpur. She also worked as an evangelist among women in the community and cared for many generations of young girls in the orphanage.

The Chatterjees' daughter, Dora Chatterjee, also worked at the orphanage and the mission school before traveling to the United States and earning a Medical Doctorate. Dora returned to Punjab and became director of a mission hospital.
