= Dora Chatterjee =

Indian physician

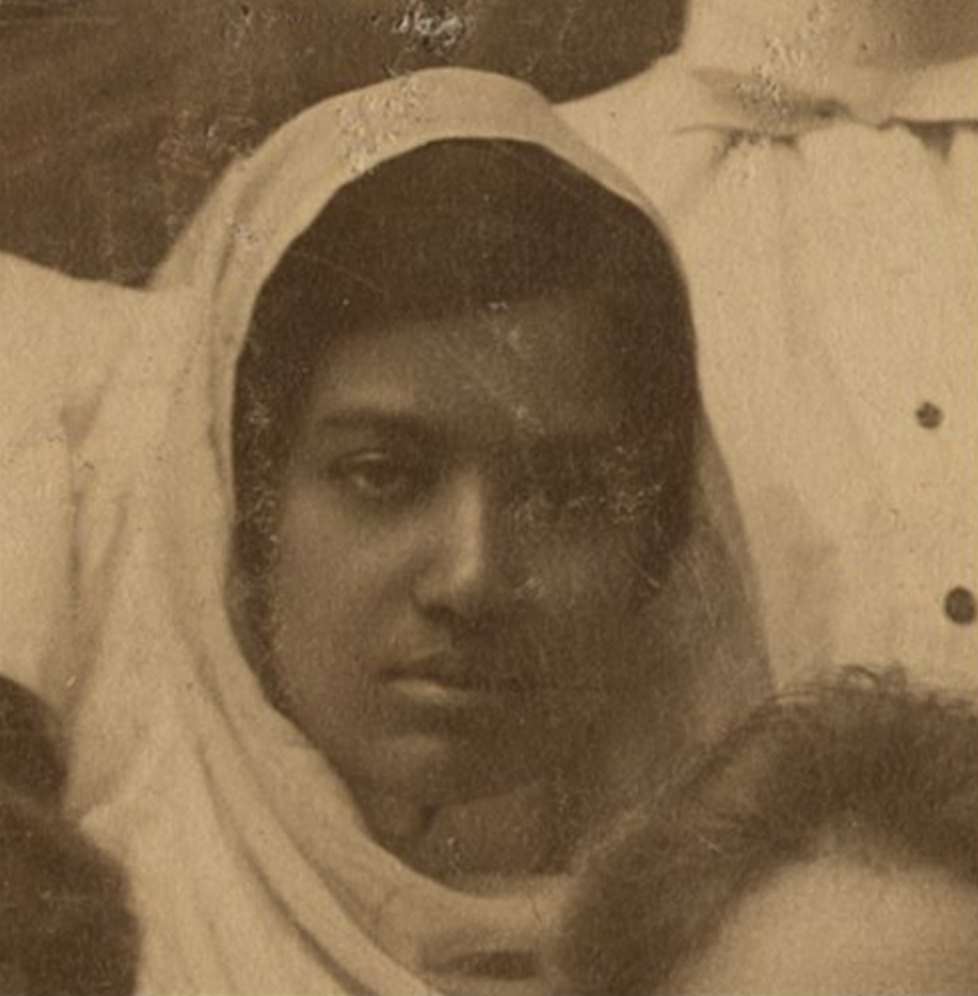
- Born: Punjab, India
- Other names: Dora Chatterjee-Rai
- Education: Woman's Medical College of Pennsylvania (MD 1901)
- Organization(s): Denny Hospital for Women and Children, Hoshiarpur, India
- Parent: Kali Charan Chatterjee

Dora Chatterjee was the third Indian woman to graduate from the Woman's Medical College of Pennsylvania and the first woman from Punjab to earn a medical degree. She founded Denny Hospital for Women and Children in Hoshiarpur.

== Biography ==
Chatterjee, who has been described as a "Hindu Prince’s Daughter", was in fact daughter of a prominent Bengali Christian Missionary family born in Punjab, India. Her father was Kali Charan Chatterjee, a Christian convert and noted Presbyterian missionary; Her mother Mary Chatterjee and her maternal grandfather the Rev. Golaknath was also active in Christian mission work. As a child, she traveled with her parents to an international missions meeting in New York in 1887.

Youngest of the five siblings, Dora Chatterjee returned to the US to study medicine at the end of the 19th century. In 1901, she graduated from Woman's Medical College of Pennsylvania in Philadelphia, now Drexel University College of Medicine, making her the third Indian woman to graduate from the school and the first woman from Punjab to earn a medical degree. The school's first Indian graduate was Anandibai Joshi, who was also the first Indian woman to attend an American medical school. The second was Gurubai Karmarkar. Chatterjee was described as "the chief interest of the graduating class" in newspapers across the US, sometimes sharing that distinction with a Russian graduate, Olga Povitzky.

Chatterjee returned to India and established the Denny Hospital for Women and Children in Hoshiarpur. She married Rai Sahib Manghat Rai, a civil servant based in the North-West Frontier Province. And had two daughters Priobala and Leena Shielarani and two sons Edward Nirmal Mangat Rai and Charles Rajinder Mangat Rai.
