= Boro Din =

Christmas in Bengali

Boro Din বড়দিন (Bengali)
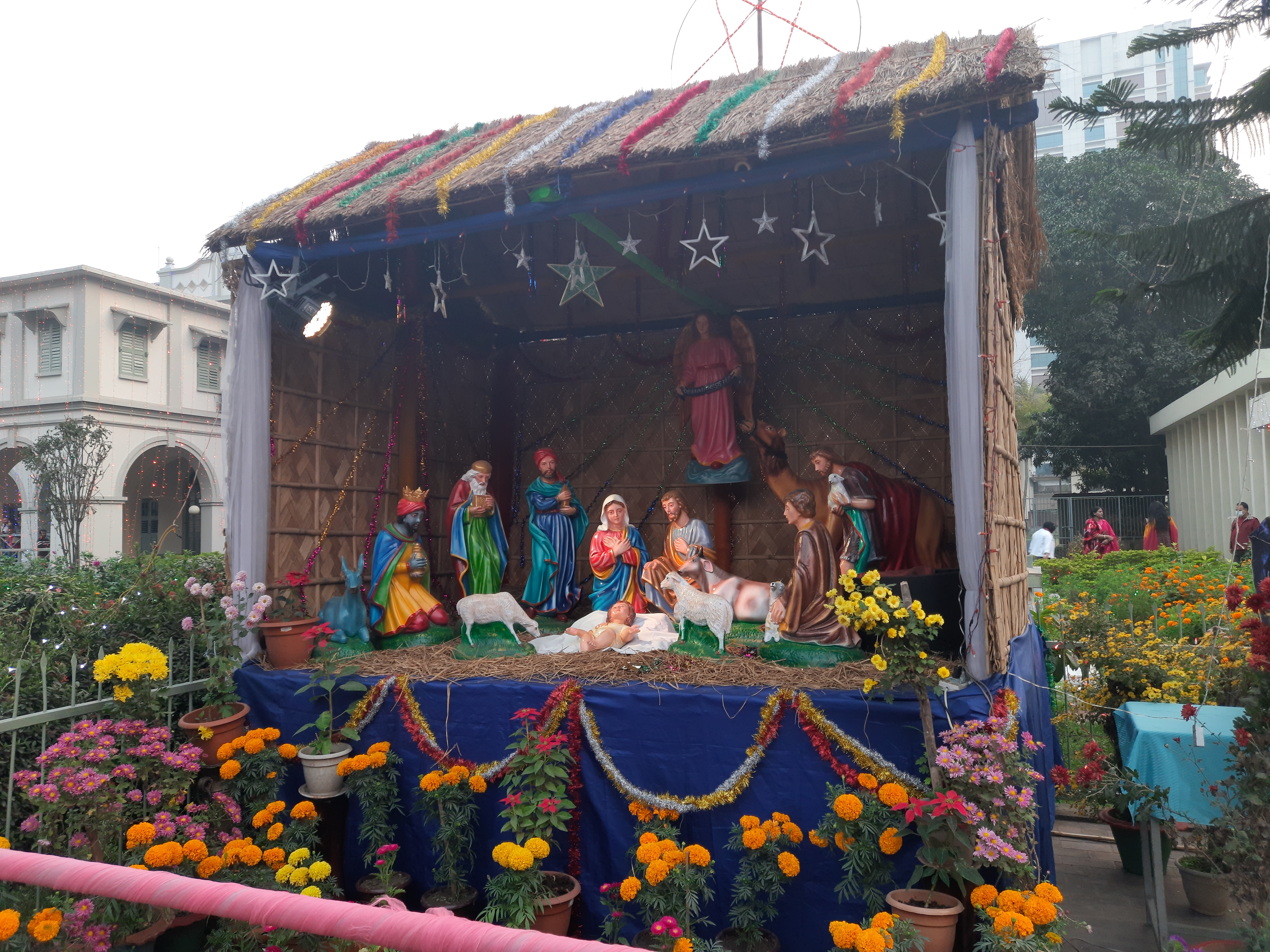
- Christmas statues depicting Mary and nativity, Archbishop's House, Kakrail, Dhaka
- Observed by: Bengali Christians
- Type: Christian, cultural, international
- Significance: Commemoration of the nativity of Jesus; Winter Solstice
- Celebrations: Gift-giving, family and other social gatherings, symbolic decoration, feasting, Picnic
- Observances: Church services
- Date: 25 December; 6 January (Armenians of Kolkata)
- Frequency: Annual

Boro Din (Bengali: বড়দিন, lit. 'big/great day') is the traditional Bengali name for Christmas. It is the biggest festival of the Bengali Christians.

== History ==
Christianity was brought to Bengal in the 16th century by Portuguese traders and missionaries. Christians in Bangladesh make up 0.30 percent of the population.

== Celebrations ==
=== In Bangladesh ===
Christians in Bangladesh give gifts to each other and visit others on Christmas. Christmas is a national holiday in Bangladesh. Kids receive money or toys from adults. People greet each other with Shubho Boro Din ('Greetings of the Great Day'). In rural areas, banana trees and leaves are used for decoration. In cities, common Christmas decorations include Christmas trees, banners and balloons. Special events are held in hotels and Christmas specials are shown on TV. Traditional foods include Christmas cake, pitha, and cookies. Christians visit churches and make Christmas cakes. Churches are decorated with Christmas lights and a Christmas tree. Church choirs perform Bengali Christmas songs. Church-held Christmas Eve feasts are called Preeti Bhoj and hymns are called Kirtan.

Christmas is also increasingly observed by people of other faiths in Bangladesh, particularly in urban areas.

== See also ==
- Christianity in Bangladesh
- Christianity in India
- Christmas worldwide
- Durga Puja in Bangladesh
