= Olga Povitzky =

American physician

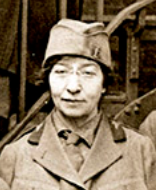
- Olga Povitzky, in France during World War I
- Born: December 24, 1877; Lithuania, Russia Empire
- Died: May 21, 1948 (aged 70); Pleasant Valley, New York, US
- Other names: Olga Povitsky, Olga Povitski
- Occupations: Physician, bacteriologist, medical researcher

Olga Raissa Povitzky (December 24, 1877 – May 21, 1948), also seen as Olga Povitsky, was a Russian-born American physician and bacteriologist with the New York Health Department; she also worked at a field hospital in France during World War I.

== Early life and education ==
Olga Povitzky was born in Lithuania, then part of the Russian Empire. She moved to the United States in 1893 to live with her brother Charles, who was a druggist in Philadelphia. Her sister Anna Pavitt Boudin became a prominent dentist in New York. Her niece, Eleanor Osborne-Hill, was a lawyer and sculptor.

Povitzky graduated from the Woman's Medical College of Pennsylvania in 1901; she and her fellow graduate, Dora Chatterjee, were highlighted in news reports of the graduation. In 1905, she completed a doctorate in public health at New York University.

== Career ==
Povitzky was a bacteriologist for the New York Health Department for almost forty years, beginning in 1910. In 1914, she joined Anna Wessels Williams for a study of trachoma in New York City schoolchildren. During World War I, she went to France to serve in a women-run field hospital, organized as the Women's Medical Unit for Foreign Service and sponsored by the National American Woman Suffrage Association (NAWSA). While in France, she received specialized training at the Pasteur Institute, in the treatment of gas gangrene; she also worked at a laboratory in Le Mans.

Back in New York, Povitzky worked on diphtheria antitoxin production. In 1923, she collaborated with Josephine Neal in developing a serum to cure meningitis, in a health department laboratory at Willard Parker Hospital. She published her research in academic journals, including Science, Archives of Internal Medicine, The Journal of Infectious Diseases, Journal of Immunology, Experimental Biology and Medicine, and American Journal of Public Health. She also lectured on public health topics.

Povitzky designed the Povitzky Bottle, a flat-sided Pyrex glass vessel used for culturing poliovirus.

== Publications ==
- "Agglutination in Pertussis" (1916, with Edward Worth)
- "The Complement Fixation Reactions of the Bordet-Gengou Bacillus" (1916, with Miriam P. Olmstead)
- "Prompt Macroscopic Agglutination in the Diagnosis of Glanders" (1918)
- "Growth of B. Influenzae without the Presence of Hemoglobin" (1921, with Anna W. Williams)
- "Improved Methods for the Isolation and Later Cultivation of B. Pertussis" (1923)
- "Diphtheria toxin-antitoxin titration by Ramon method for practical application" (1924, with Edwin J. Banzhaf)
- "Diphtheria Toxoid. Preparation and Dosage" (1931, with Minnie Eisner and Erla Jackson)
- "Predominant Strain of B. influenzae in Influenzal Meningitis" (1933)
- "Effectiveness of Standard Diphtheria Antitoxin Against all Types of Diphtheria Infection" (1933, with Minnie Eisner and Erla Jackson)
- "The Effect of Temperature on the Antigenic Value of Diphtheria Toxoid" (1935, with Minnie Eisner)
- "Standardization and Application of Different Preparations of Diphtheria Toxoid" (1936)

== Personal life ==
Povitzky became a United States citizen in 1904. She died in 1948, in Moores Mill, Pleasant Valley, New York, aged 71 years.
