= Hubert Costa =

Polish politician (born 1953)

member of Sejm 2005-2007
- In office 25 September 2005 – 4 November 2007

Personal details
- Born: 21 April 1953 (age 73) Dhaka, Bangladesh
- Party: Samoobrona

Hubert Ranjan Costa (born 21 April 1953) is a Polish politician. Born in Bangladesh, studied in Poland, he was elected to Sejm on 25 September 2005, getting 3521 votes in 1 Legnica district as a candidate from Samoobrona Rzeczpospolitej Polskiej list.

In his youth, he was a guerrilla fighter and took part in the Bangladesh War of Independence. He came to Poland in 1975. In 1982, he graduated from the Faculty of Medicine of the Medical University of Wrocław, and in 2002 - postgraduate studies in health care management at the Wrocław University of Economics. In the years 1982–1984 he was an intern at the ZOZ in Złotoryja. Since 1984, he has been employed as a surgeon at the hospital in Legnica. Initially, he held the position of an assistant, then from 1995 to 1998 he headed the emergency room. In 1998, he became deputy head of the department, and in 2000, head of the surgical department.

In 2002, he joined the Self-Defence of Poland. In the years 2002–2005, he was a councilor of the Lower Silesian Voivodeship Assembly, and served as chairman of the Social Policy, Health and Family Committee. From January to April 2003, he sat on the voivodeship board. In February 2005, he became the chairman of the party in Legnica. In 2005, as a candidate from 5th place on the Samoobrona RP list in the Legnica district, he was elected to the Sejm of the 5th term, receiving 3,521 votes. He became the first dark-skinned parliamentarian of the Republic of Poland. He sat on the National and Ethnic Minorities Committee, the Health Committee and four subcommittees.

He did not run for re-election in the early parliamentary elections in 2007. Shortly thereafter, he left Self-Defense of the Republic of Poland and withdrew from political activity. In 2010, he became the president of the commercial law company Costa Medicus. He also took up the position of head of the hospital emergency department of the Provincial Specialist Hospital in Legnica.

In 2021, he was awarded the honorary Polish badge "For services to health protection" by the Minister of Health.

== See also ==
- Members of Polish Sejm 2005-2007
