= Ram Chandra Bose =

Indian educator, a lay evangelist, and a prominent writer

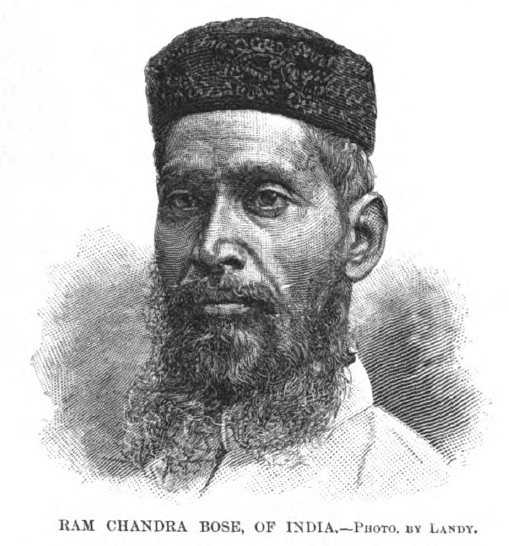

Ram Chandra Bose (sometimes spelled Ram Chunder Basu or Ramachandra Vasu; May 16, 1836 – May 30, 1892) was an educator, a lay evangelist, and a prominent writer in the region of North India known as the North-Western Provinces and Oudh in the late 19th century. He converted to Christianity while a student in Calcutta. Upon completing his education, he was employed by several Christian mission agencies as well as the government to teach in their schools. In the 1870s and 1880s, he was associated with the American Methodist Episcopal Mission and travelled across India as a lay evangelist. Many of his lectures were published as journal articles or compiled into books creating a prolific literary legacy. Bose wrote over 100 journal articles on religious, philosophical, and social issues for journals such as The Bengal Magazine edited by Lal Behari Day as well as the Calcutta Review, the Indian Evangelical Review, and others. Shortly before he died in 1892, he left the American Methodist Mission to join the Anglican Church Missionary Society.

== Early life and education ==
Ram Chandra Bose was born into what he described "one of those castes called in India the literary castes," but without providing specific detail. Bose stated that it was for this reason that his parents were anxious to educate him even if it meant sending him to a Christian school. While he was the Free Church Institution started by Alexander Duff, he was "initiated into the mysteries of the English language" as well as Western approaches to science, geography, history, and philosophy. Through his study of the Bible and other Christian books, he and his cousin Bhuban Mohan Bose, embraced Christian belief and were baptized by William Sinclair Mackay (1807–1865) of the Free Church of Scotland on 16 July 1851. His cousin, Bhuban Mohan Bose, would later become the father of Chandramukhi Basu, one of the first two female graduates of British India.

== Career ==
=== Teacher ===
After completing his education, Ram Chandra Bose was invited by the London Missionary Society to teach at the LMS Central School in Varanasi for about ten years starting in 1854. Subsequently, he was employed by the British government in India to be the headmaster of a school in Sitapur where he was lauded for his abilities by several officials including Robert Milman, Bishop of Calcutta. He left government employment around 1872 to teach in the Boys' Orphanage run by missionaries of the Methodist Episcopal Church in Shahjahanpur. He also taught in the Methodist school in Moradabad and the Centennial School in Lucknow also run by the Methodists.

=== Evangelist and writer ===
In 1877, Bose was appointed by the Methodist Mission to work as an evangelist preaching to educated Indians. He gave lectures on a variety of topics including Christian apologetics in cities across North India and eventually throughout much of India. He published many of these lectures first as journal articles and then compiled into books such as The Truth of the Christian Religion as Established by the Miracles of Christ (1881). Bose also lectured and wrote on Hinduism, providing philosophical and Christian analyses of the various expressions of Hinduism in India, particularly of the reformist movement, the Brahmo Samaj, and of one of its breakaway factions led by Keshub Chandra Sen. He was a regular contributor to the Bengal Magazine, the Lucknow Witness, and the Indian Evangelical Review on subjects related to the Indian Christian community and to the work of foreign missionaries including an early analysis of the revivalist preaching of William Taylor A criticism of foreign mission work which surfaced regularly in Bose's writings was the "race distinctions" made by missionaries between their communities and the Indian Christian communities. In one of his articles, he argued, "If there is one spot in this world, where race distinctions and race disabilities ought to be most thoroughly obliterated and extinguished, where races should meet on equal terms as castes meet within the sacred confines of the great temple of Jaggannath, that spot is the Mission field." Having had a long career as a teacher, Bose also wrote regularly on aspects of education in India. In his final years, Bose shifted the focus of his writings to the early history of the Christian Church, possibly as a result of his theological investigations into episcopal polity and his consequent move from Methodism to Anglicanism. Beginning with an article on the second century Christian apologist Justin Martyr in which he advocated polemical writings and controversial discourse as a valid means of presenting an intellectual defense of Christianity, Bose wrote a series of a dozen or so articles on Early Christianity and key Church Fathers. All his published writings were in the English language, not in his native Bengali or his adopted Urdu.

=== Conference delegate in America ===
Ram Chandra Bose was twice elected to be the official lay delegate to the General Conference of the Methodist Episcopal Church in the United States. When he arrived for the Conference in Cincinnati in 1880 along with 9 other delegates from foreign countries, it was the first time foreign delegates had attended the General Conference in an official capacity. Bose attended once again in the next General Conference held in Philadelphia in 1884. One of the discussions in which he participated was on the question of appointing missionary bishops for overseas regions such as India. He received many opportunities to speak in churches, at conferences, and at university ceremonies during his visits to the States. He published his thoughtful and, at times, critical reflections on American society first in a series of articles in The Bengal Magazine which were then compiled into his book Gossip about America and Europe (1883). Because of the scholarship demonstrated in his lectures and writings, Simpson College awarded him a Master of Arts as an honorary degree in 1881.

== Political involvement ==
Ram Chandra Bose was one of the Indian Christians who actively participated in the Indian National Congress in its early years. The "Proceedings" of the Fourth Indian National Congress meeting held in Allahabad in 1888 lists him as a delegate from Lucknow who had been elected "at the meeting of the Rafa-i-Am Association and at the meetings of the Bengal Christian Conference and Bengal Christian Alliance." He had also been at the Congress meetings in Madras (1887) and Bombay (1889). In an article published in the Calcutta journal, The National Magazine, Bose praised the Congress and its aspirations, particularly for its work in initiating a movement towards national unification and for its efforts to bring about reform through reasonable, moderate, and constitutional resolutions. In what was perhaps his final published article, he returned to the theme of the unification of India, arguing that it was possible because of the inherent equality of all people. Bose also addressed other political issues of his day such as the Ilbert Bill and the blatant racism of those who opposed the implementation of the Bill in India.

== Death and legacy ==
Ram Chandra Bose died on May 30, 1892 in the city of Lucknow. While he had been lecturing Calcutta a few months earlier, he had an attack of fever and was unable to complete the course of lectures. He returned to Lucknow to be with his relatives but was unable to regain his health. Isabella Thoburn, who had been instrumental in his spiritual journey during the Lucknow revival in the early 1870s, was with him towards the end of his life. She noted that he had not been well for some years but found the final three months of confinement to his room frustrating because of his desire to continue his preaching. Despite his passion for preaching, Bose's lasting legacy has been his writings. His two volumes on Hindu philosophy and his writings on the Brahmo Samaj and on Keshub Chandra Sen comprise an early analysis of diverse expressions of Hinduism from the perspective of an Indian Christian. His apologetic writings provided the Christian communities in South Asia with a reasoned defense of their faith. His insightful critique of Christian missionary policies and practices were a continual challenge to the foreign missionaries who worked in India to not ignore the social implications of the Gospel they preached. But his influence was not limited to that country; his travels to America and Britain resulted him in being an important interpreter of India and its customs to those nations as well as an interpreter of America and Britain to India. His final writings on early Christian history consist of perhaps the first in-depth theological reflections on the history of the Church written by an Indian Protestant.
