= Kali Charan Banerjee =

Indian politician

Kali Charan Banurji
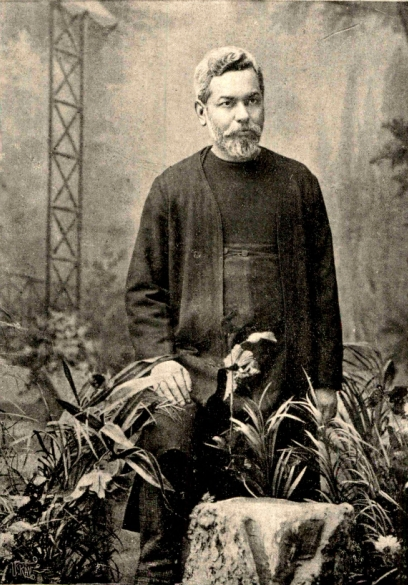
- c. 1900

Personal details
- Born: 1847 Jabalpur, British India
- Died: 1907 (aged 59–60) Calcutta, British India
- Party: Indian National Congress

Kali Charan Banerjee (1847–1907), spelt also as Kalicharan Banerji or K.C. Banerjea or K.C. Banurji, was a Bengali convert to Christianity through the Free Church of Scotland, the founder of Calcutta Christo Samaj, a Calcutta lawyer, and a founding member of the Indian National Congress.

== Biography ==
Banerjee was born into a Bengali Kulin Brahmin family in Jabalpur in Madhya Pradesh while his father was on a work assignment. Wishing to send his son to a prestigious English-medium college, Banerji's father sent him to the Free Church of Scotland college in Calcutta(present Kolkata) in 1860 where Alexander Duff was principal. Through the encouragement of his teachers in the college and fellow Bengali students, Banerjee began studying the Bible and seeking instruction in the Christian faith. One of the major influences in his spiritual journey was Lal Behari Dey. Upon his decision to become a follower of Christ, Banerjee traveled to his native village and informed his relatives. His family was initially heartbroken and hostile towards his decision, but after a few years Kali Charan was reconciled with the family. On 28 February 1864, Banerjee was baptized at the Free Church college. He later joined the Manicktollah (Maniktala) Free Church, probably the present-day Duff Church, and served for a period as a deacon.

Banerjee proved to be an outstanding student, receiving a scholarship and graduating with honours in 1865 with a Bachelor of Arts. He also completed a Master of Arts in Mental and Moral Philosophy from the Free Church college in 1866. After graduating, Banerjee was appointed as a professor in the Free Church college, a position he held until 1879.

Although he considered seeking ordination to pastoral ministry, he chose instead to pursue a career as a lawyer. Banerjee received his Bachelor of Law in 1870 and began work as an advocate in the city of Calcutta alongside his academic responsibilities. In 1877 he became a Fellow of the University of Calcutta.

He taught reading and writing as a teacher to Brahmabandhab Upadhyay aka Bhabani[Bhawani] Charan Banerjee, a Roman Catholic; Hindu Sadhu(Sanyasi); and Bengali Catholic nationalist, related to K.C. Banerji, who happens to be the uncle of Upadhyay. Upadhyay laid the foundation for a Vedanta-based Christian theology, Vedantic Thomism - Upadhyay came to know Jesus Christ from his uncle Reverend Kalicharan Banerji and Keshub Chunder Sen, Brahmo Samaj and Naba Bidhan leader - he died prematurely as a prisoner, charged with sedition by Colonial government of Calcutta.

=== Congress leader ===
First session of Indian National Congress, Bombay, 28–31 December 1885

He being a fine orator and representative of Bengali Christian community, he joined the Indian National Congress(Congress) in 1885, and regularly addressed the Congress annual sessions in moulding the policy of national movement. Rev. Kalicharan Banerji along with G.C. Nath from Lahore, Ram Chandra Bose from Lucknow, and Peter Paul Pillai from Madras(present Chennai), represented Indian Christians at the four sessions of the Congress between 1888 and 1891, and became a prominent leader in the Congress in the early years of formation.

With regular participation in the annual sessions of Congress, he was able to influence and succeed in putting a number of proposals before the Colonial British government of Calcutta for administrative reforms. In 1889 Congress session, he was responsible for resolution demanding improvement in the educational systems, particularly University education—higher education. He also presided over the grand meeting that discussed the advantages of the municipal elective system, of the Indian League—This seems, attracted Richard Temple, then-Lieutenant governor of Bengal - Temple then called Babu Shishir Kumar Ghose and discussed about his willingness to introduce elective system in municipal bodies.

=== Indian Christian leader ===
He strongly advocated for and defended the Indian Christian nationality in 1870. At the age of 25, he started a newspaper called The Bengal Christian Herald, later changed its name to The Indian Christian Herald. In his own words as reported in The Bengal Christian Herald:

In having become Christians, we have not ceased to be Hindus. We are Hindu Christian....We have embraced Christianity but we have not rejected our nationality. We are intensely national as any of our bretheren.

He was an active member of theBengal Christian Association, the first Christian organisation for the promotion of Christian Truth and Godliness, founded in 1868 by a group of Christians in Calcutta with an intention of creating a national and independent Indian church. Krishna Mohan Banerjee was its first president.

In 1877, he along with J.G. Shome created a forum by organizing the Bengali Christian conference to present their programme. They criticized the missionaries of denationalizing the Indian Christians and making them into compound converts:

They criticized the missionaries of denationalizing the Indian Christians, making them into compound converts, but first and foremost of transferring the theological and ecclesiastical differences of the West of India, thereby dividing the Indian Christians into numerous denominations. At the same time, they demanded indigenous forms of worship.

A group of Christians under the leadership of K.C. Banerjee and J.G. Shome left their churches and founded Calcutta Christo Samaj in competition to Brahmo Samaj at Calcutta in 1887 that has no clergy, but affirmed only the apostles creed. Their purpose was to propagate the Christian truth and promote Christian union. They intended to garner all Indian churches together and thereby eliminate denominationalism.

He being a Protestant Christian, a group of nationalist leaders who associated themselves with the Indian National Congress perceived that "Christianity in India was full of stagnant Western waters and could be cleansed only through Indian Christian literature." [sic]—the attempts of Protestant Christians to indigenize Christianity created rift between Protestants and Catholics leading to establishment of non-denominational missionary organizations; consequently, in 1887, he along with Shome founded the Calcutta Christo Samaj. K.C. Banerjee later changed his attire to wearing the clothes of Sannyasin, and moved closer to Scottish missionaries in Bengal; his association with Scottish missionaries in Bengal brought closer and impressed Scottish missionaries in Madras too, especially Madras Christian College—then-epicenter of the "Re-thinking Christianity in India Group". The Re-thinking Group of Madras, asserted that the missionary emphasis on institutions like Church in India was not wise and reiterated that Christianity must understand the spiritual genius of India, forms of worship, and categories of thought so as to take root in the Indian soil; as a result, development of spirituality through Bhakti tradition, and inculturation of the Christian faith through the avatar entered into their religious affairs.

Kalicharan Banurji along with Shome representing Bengali Christians participated in a decennial missionary conference at Calcutta in 1882, and in Re-thinkers assemblage at Bombay(present Mumbai) in 1892 strongly advocating for united and single Indian church—one, not divided, native, not foreign. In the Bombay conference, he presented a paper entitled "The Native Church - Its Organization and Self Support"—an excerpt of that paper:

That the missionaries of India, the majority of whom represent foreign missions, should, in conference assembled, embody, in their programme, the conception of 'The Native Church', is an indication of momentous significance. It signifies, on their part a readiness to recognize the ideal that the Native Church in India should be one, not divided; native, not foreign. Nay, it conveys the promise that, henceforth, they shall not impose by rule, upons the converts they are privileged to gather, the accidents of denominational Christianity, at once divisive and exotic, with which they themselves happen to be identified.

Kalicharan Banerjee and Tamilians like Parani Andi(known also as Pulney Andy), V.S Azariah, P. Chenchiah, and K. T. Paul were credited for being the pioneers in reformulating "Rethinking Movement in Indian Christianity"—indigenous mission reflecting the cultural heritage of India and stand aloof from Western cultural domination—Re-thinking in the context of developing Indian expressions of Biblical life and faith against the traditional patterns implanted by Western minds. As a result, The National Church of Madras in 1886, The Christo Samaj of Calcutta in 1887, The Marthoma Evangelical Association of Kerala in 1888, and The Hindu Church of the Lord Jesus in Tinnevelly in 1903 were seen as the first attempts to create indigenous missions by Indian Christian community in India.

In spite of Church organisation becoming a Rethinking group in 1877 and then into a new Church movement in 1887, Calcutta Christo Samaj survived only for few years since "non-denominational Indian church" failed to overtake the already well-established missionary churches with solid foundation and adequate local resources, long before. According to B.R. Barber, biographer of K.C. Banurji:

for eight years these pioneers of unity struggled onward seeking to found the church of India; but denominationalism proved far too strong for them. The Samaj never grew to any proportions, and finally died out in 1895.

After the dissolution of the Christo Samaj, Banerjee rejoined his former church (Manicktollah Free Church) and spent his last years working with the YMCA in Calcutta, facilitating evangelistic gatherings for university students. He was present at the formation of the National Missionary Society of India on 25 December 1905 and was elected one of its vice-presidents alongside Kali Charan Chatterjee and V.S Azariah.

== Gandhi's visit to Kalicharan Banerji ==
Gandhi, having told his Christian friends in South Africa that he would meet the Christian Indians and acquaint himself with their condition; accordingly, Gandhi while taking shelter at Gokhale's residence, decided to visit Babu Kalicharan Banerji, whom Gandhi held high regard as he took a prominent part in Congress in spite of isolating himself from Hindus and Mussalmans. When Gandhi went to Kalicharan's home, Mrs. Kalicharan was on her death-bed, and in his own words:

I sought an appointment, which he readily gave me. When I went, I found that his wife was on her death-bed. His house was simple. In the Congress I had seen him in a coat and trousers, but I was glad to find him now wearing a Bengal dhoti and shirt. I liked his simple mode of dress, though I myself then wore a Parsi coat and trousers. Without much ado I presented my difficulties to him. He asked: "Do you believe in the doctrine of original sin?"

"I do," said I. "Well then, Hinduism offers no absolution therefrom, Christianity does," and added: "The wages of sin is death, and the Bible says that the only way of deliverance is surrender unto Jesus." I put forward Bhakti-marga (the path of devotion) of the Bhagavad Gita, but to no avail. I thanked him for his goodness. He failed to satisfy me, but I benefited by

the interview.

Gandhi, having grasped the concept of Hinduism and also the traditions he was following, he seems to have pulled by the attractiveness of the example of Jesus; accordingly, in 1901, he made one determined effort to see if Christianity was the path he should follow. In 1925, when presenting to Christian missionaries, he described this step, which involved going to see Indian converted Christian Kali Charan Banerjee:

I told Mr. Banerjee, “I have come to you as a seeker—” . . . Well, I am not going to engage you in giving a description of the little discussion that we had between us. It was very good, very noble. I came away, not sorry, not dejected, not disappointed, but I felt sad that even Mr. Banerjee could not convince me. This was my final deliberate striving to realize Christianity as it was presented to me.

== See also ==
- Niralamba Swami
- Nabo Bidhan or New Dispensation
