= Bengal Orissa Bihar Baptist Convention =

Christian denomination in India

Bengal Orissa Bihar Baptist Convention is a Baptist Christian denomination in India. It operates in Odisha, Bihar and West Bengal, in the eastern part of India. It is affiliated with the Baptist World Alliance. According to a census published by the association in 2023, it claimed 53,000 members and 405 churches.
