= Chandramukhi Basu =

Indian Bengali educationist

Chandramukhi Bose
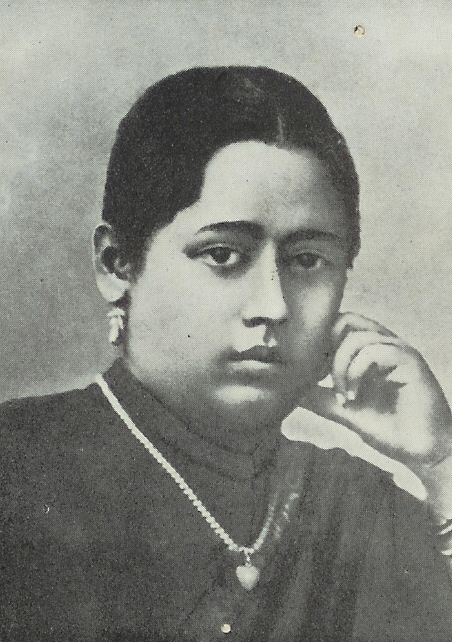
- Born: 1860; Dehradun, British India
- Died: 3 February 1944 (aged 83–84); Dehradun, British India
- Education: Duff College; University of Calcutta
- Occupation: Educationist
- Spouse: Pandit Keswaranand Mamgain

Chandramukhi Basu (1860 – 3 February 1944), a Bengali from Dehradun, was one of the first two female graduates of the British India. In 1882, along with Kadambini Ganguly, she passed the examination of the bachelor's degree in arts (BA) from University of Calcutta. Their formal degrees were handed during the convocation of the university in 1883.

== Early life ==
The daughter of Bhuban Mohan Bose, she passed the First Arts examination from Dehradun Native Christian School in 1880. At that time Bethune School, to which she wanted to enter; did not admit non-Hindu girls, and as such she had to be admitted at the First Arts (F.A.) level in Reverend Alexander Duff's Free Church Institution (now the Scottish Church College). In 1876, because of the discriminatory official stances towards gender, she had to be given special permission to appear for the F.A. examination. As the only girl to appear for the examination that year, she had ranked first, but the university had to hold a series of meetings to decide whether her results could be published. Before Kadambini Ganguly, Chandramukhi Basu had already cleared her Entrance Examination in 1876, although the university refused to enlist her as a successful candidate. Only the university's changed resolution in 1878 allowed her to study further After she passed her F.A. examination, she moved to Bethune College for the degree course, along with Kadambini Ganguly. After her graduation, she was the only (and first) woman to pass MA from the University of Calcutta, and the British empire in 1884.

== Career ==
She started her career as a lecturer in Bethune College (it was still part of Bethune School) in 1886. The college was separated from the school in 1888. She became the principal, thus becoming the first female head of an undergraduate academic establishment in South Asia.

She retired in 1891 because of bad health and spent the rest of her life in Dehradun.

== Sisters ==
Two of her sisters, Bidhumukhi and Bindubasini, were also renowned. Bidhumukhi Bose and Virginia Mary Mitra (Nandi), graduated in 1890, were among the earliest women medical graduates from Calcutta Medical College. Thereafter, Bindubasini Bose graduated from Calcutta Medical College in 1891.
