= Sukumari Bhattacharji =

Indologist

Sukumari Bhattacharji (12 July 1921 – 24 May 2014) was a Sanskrit scholar, author (Bengali and English), and indologist.

Born in Kolkata, Bhattacharji initially studied English due to scholarship restrictions but later pursued a master's degree in Sanskrit privately. She joined Jadavpur University as a professor and was known for her proficiency in multiple languages. Bhattacharji's most notable work, The Indian Theogony: A Comparative Study of Indian Mythology from the Vedas to the Puranas, was based on her doctoral thesis and published by Cambridge University Press. As a social activist, she co-founded the non-profit organization Sachetana in 1982 to aid underprivileged girls. Historian Romila Thapar regarded Bhattacharji as one of the foremost indologists of her time.

== Biography ==
Sukumari Bhattacharji was born to Christian parents Sarasi Kumar and Santabala Dutta in Kolkata. Sarasi Kumar had been known to be relative of poet Miachel Madhusudan Dutt. Bhattacharjee had done her schooling at St. Margaret School. She stood first in her bachelor's degree with Sanskrit and became qualified for scholarship of Ishan at Calcutta University, but due to her being Christian she was deemed ineligible as per the endowment policy of the scholarship. This lead her not to pursue Sanskrit for her Masters. She studied English from Calcutta University. She married Prof. Amal Kumar Bhattacharji and joined as professor of English at Lady Brabourn College. Later in the year 1954, she pursued master's degree in Sanskrit privately. Budhadeb Basu had invited her to teach in the comparative literature department, Jadavpur University in the year 1957, where she continued as the professor at the Sanskrit department later. Bhattacharji was known to be conversant with Sanskrit, Pali, Greek, French, German etc.

== Works ==
Bhattacharji was mostly known for her magnum opus The Indian Theogony: A Comparative Study of Indian mythology from the Vedas to the Puranas. This work was based on her doctoral thesis regarding the relationship, formation and coherence of Bramha, Vishnu and Maheswar against time in society in the year 1964. A few years later she was invited to pursue comparative research as the post doctoral fellowship at Cambridge University during 1966–67. Her works were compiled under the title in the year 1970 by Cambridge University Press.

She was also a declared Marxist and involved and conversant with contemporary left activism. As the part of her social activism with collaboration with Yasodhara Bagchi, she had formed Sachetana in 1982 to provide aid to the under privileged girls for making them self-sufficient.

== Books authored ==
- The Indian Theogony: A Comparative Study of Indian Mythology from the Vedas to the Puranas
- Fatalism in Ancient India
- Legends of Devi
- Buddhist hybrid Sanskrit literature
- The Ramayana and the Mahabharata : comparative popularity
- History of Classical Sanskrit Literature
- Religion, Culture and Government
- Fate and Fortune in the Indian scriptures

== Reception ==
Historian Romila Thapar considered Bhattacharji as one of the 'foremost Indologists of her times'. The comparative analysis of the Indian Mythology and European mythology by Bhattacharji has been regarded as a valuable work as well.
