= Krishna Mohan Banerjee =

Bengali scholar (1813–1885)

Reverend Krishna Mohan Banerjee
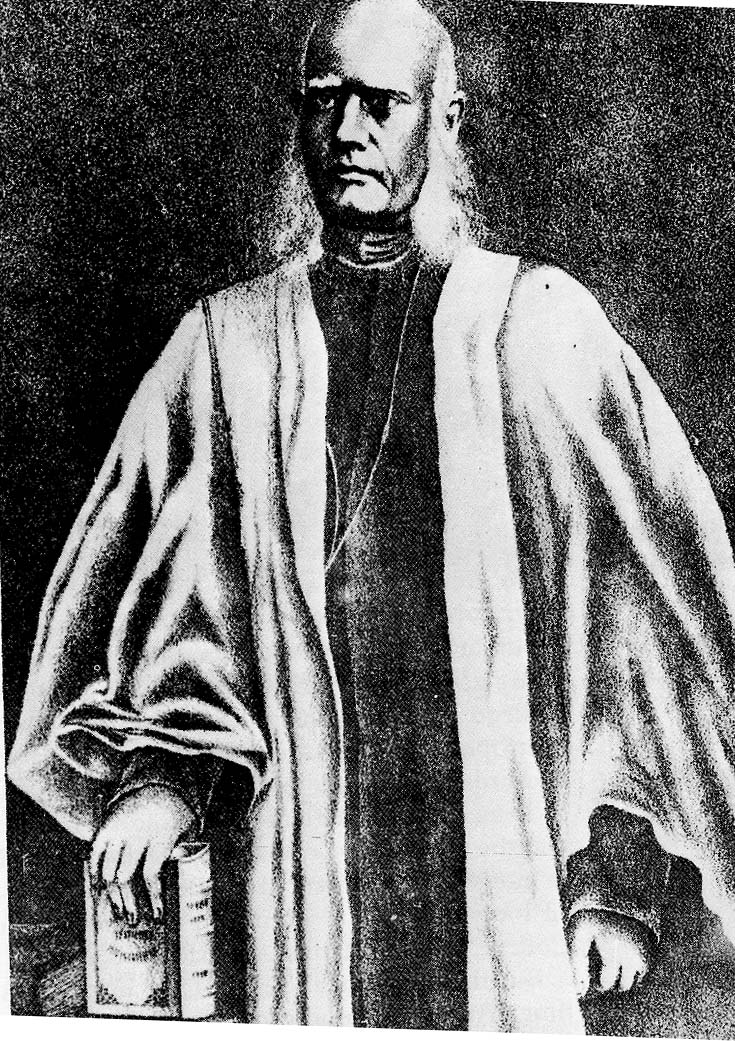
- 1886 lithograph of Krishna Mohan Banerjee
- Born: 24 May 1813; Calcutta, Bengal, British India
- Died: 11 May 1885; Calcutta, Bengal, British India
- Occupations: Christian Evangelist, Professor, Litterateur

Krishna Mohan Banerjee (24 May 1813 – 11 May 1885) was a 19th-century Indian thinker who attempted to rethink Hindu philosophy, religion and ethics in response to the stimulus of Christian ideas. He himself became a Christian, and was the first president of the Bengal Christian Association, which was administered and financed by Indians. He was a prominent member of Henry Louis Vivian Derozio's (1808–1831) Young Bengal group, educationist, linguist and Christian missionary.

== Early life ==
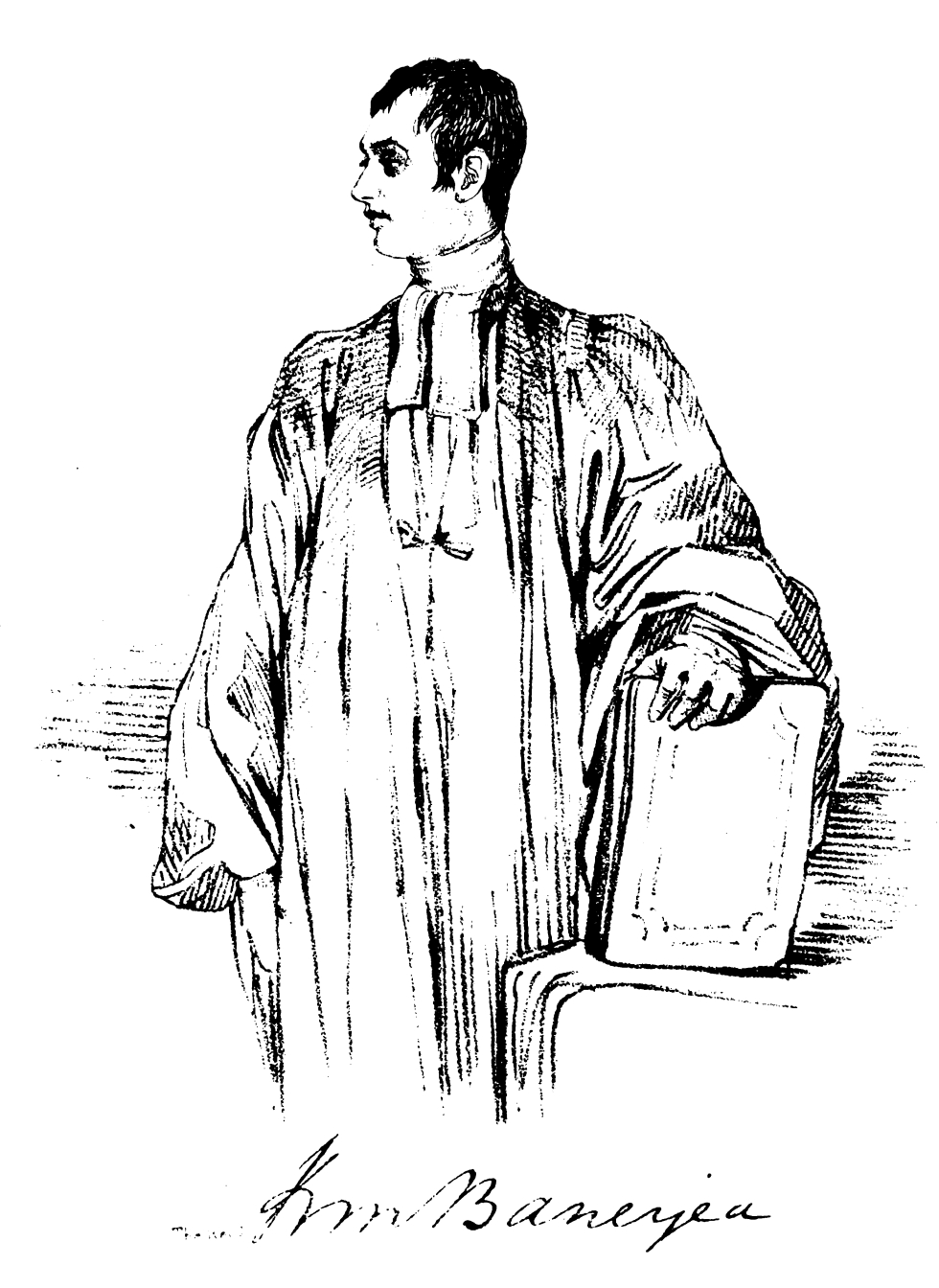
Portrait by Colesworthey Grant

Son of the Bengali Brahmin Jibon Krishna Banerjee and Sreemoti Devi, Krishna Mohan was born on 24 May 1813 at Shyampukur, Kolkata, Bengal, in the house of his maternal grandfather, Ramjay Vidyabhusan, the court-pundit of Santiram Singha of Jorasanko, who was the great-grandfather of the famous Kaliprasanna Singha.

In 1819, Krishna Mohan joined the School Society Institution (later renamed as Hare School) founded by David Hare at Colootola. Impressed by his talents, Hare took him to his school at Pataldanga, later famous as Hare School in 1822.

Banerjee joined the newly founded Hindu College with a scholarship.

In 1831, Banerjee started publishing The Inquirer. In the same year he was excommunicated by his family for refusing to apologize for his friends' consumption of beef and beer at his house. This inspired him to write his play, The Persecuted: or, Dramatic Scenes Illustrative of the Present State of Hindoo Society in Calcutta, the first original English-language drama by an Indian. It was never performed. Upon its publication, it was well received by English reviewers at the time for exposing the hypocrisies of Kolkata's Brahmin orthodoxy and for its author's use of the English language.

While at college he used to attend the lectures of the Scottish Christian missionary, Alexander Duff, who had come to India in 1830.

His father died of cholera in 1828.

== Conversion to Christianity ==
When the missionary society had begun its philanthropic activities in Kolkata, Banerjee became the first Bengali priest of Christ Church where he used to preach and deliver sermons in Bengali.

He converted his wife, his brother Kali Mohan, and Ganendra Mohan Tagore, the son of Prasanna Coomar Tagore to Christian faith. Subsequently, Ganendra Mohan married his daughter Kamalmani and became the first Indian to qualify as a barrister. He was also instrumental in the conversion of Michael Madhusudan Dutt.

== Later life ==
In 1852, Krishna Mohan was appointed a professor of Oriental Studies at Bishop's College, Kolkata. He had studied aspects of Christianity as a student of the same college between 1836 and 1839.

In 1864 he was elected to be a member of the Royal Asiatic Society along with Iswar Chandra Vidyasagar. In 1876 the University of Calcutta honoured him with an honorary doctorate degree.

Reverend Krishna Mohan Banerjee died on 11 May 1885 in Kolkata, and was buried at Shibpur with his wife. The graveyard is currently located inside the campus of IIEST.

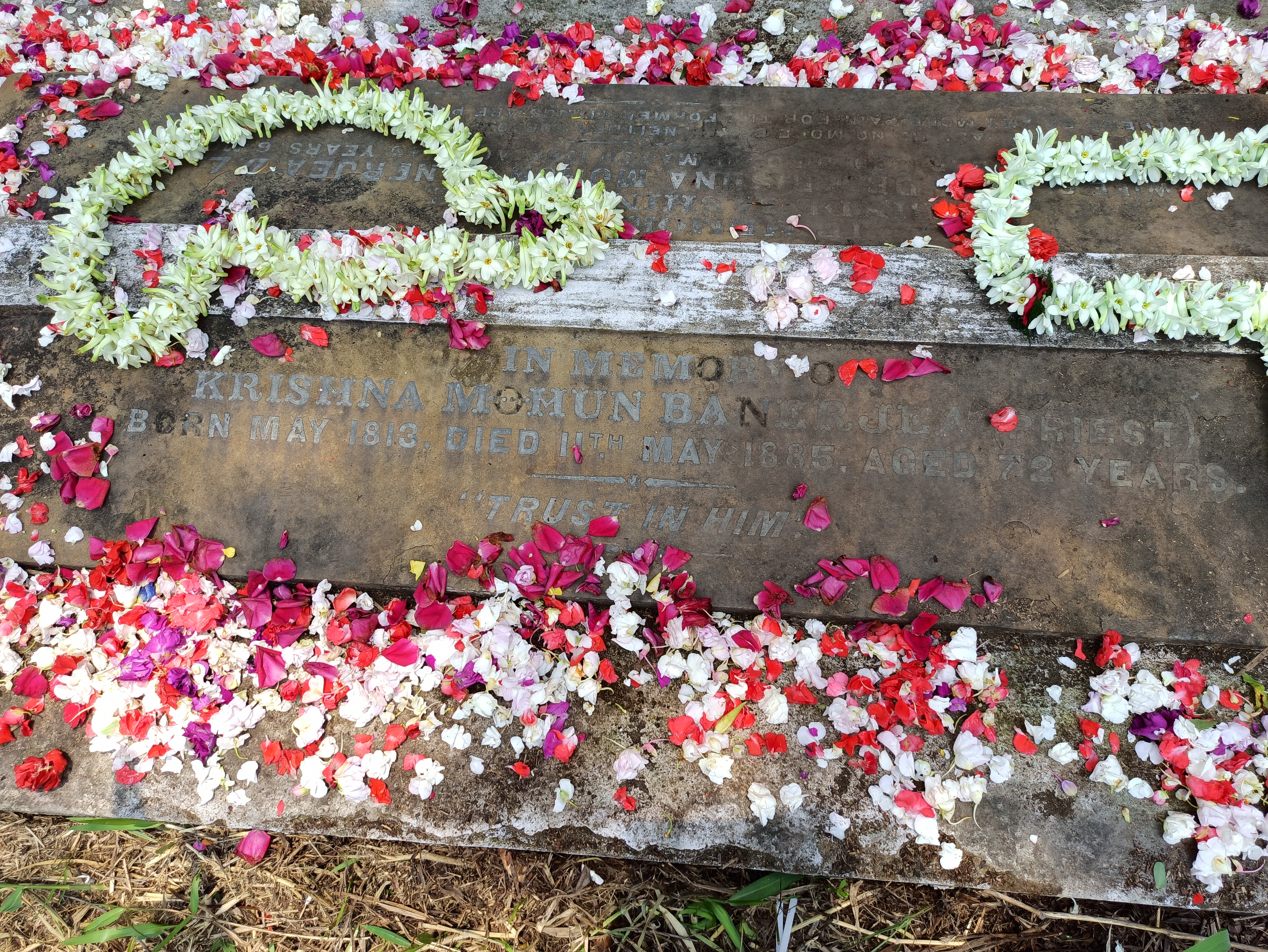
Grave of Rev. Krishna Mohan Banerjee present at IIEST Shibpur campus

== Works ==
He published a 13-volume English – Bengali adaptation of Encyclopædia Britannica, Vidyakalpadruma or Encyclopædia Bengalensis (1846–51). He wrote an Indian English drama "The persecuted" in 1831..

His other works include The Arian Witness (1875), Dialogues on the Hindu Philosophy (1861), and The Relation Between Christianity and Hinduism (1881).

== Memory ==
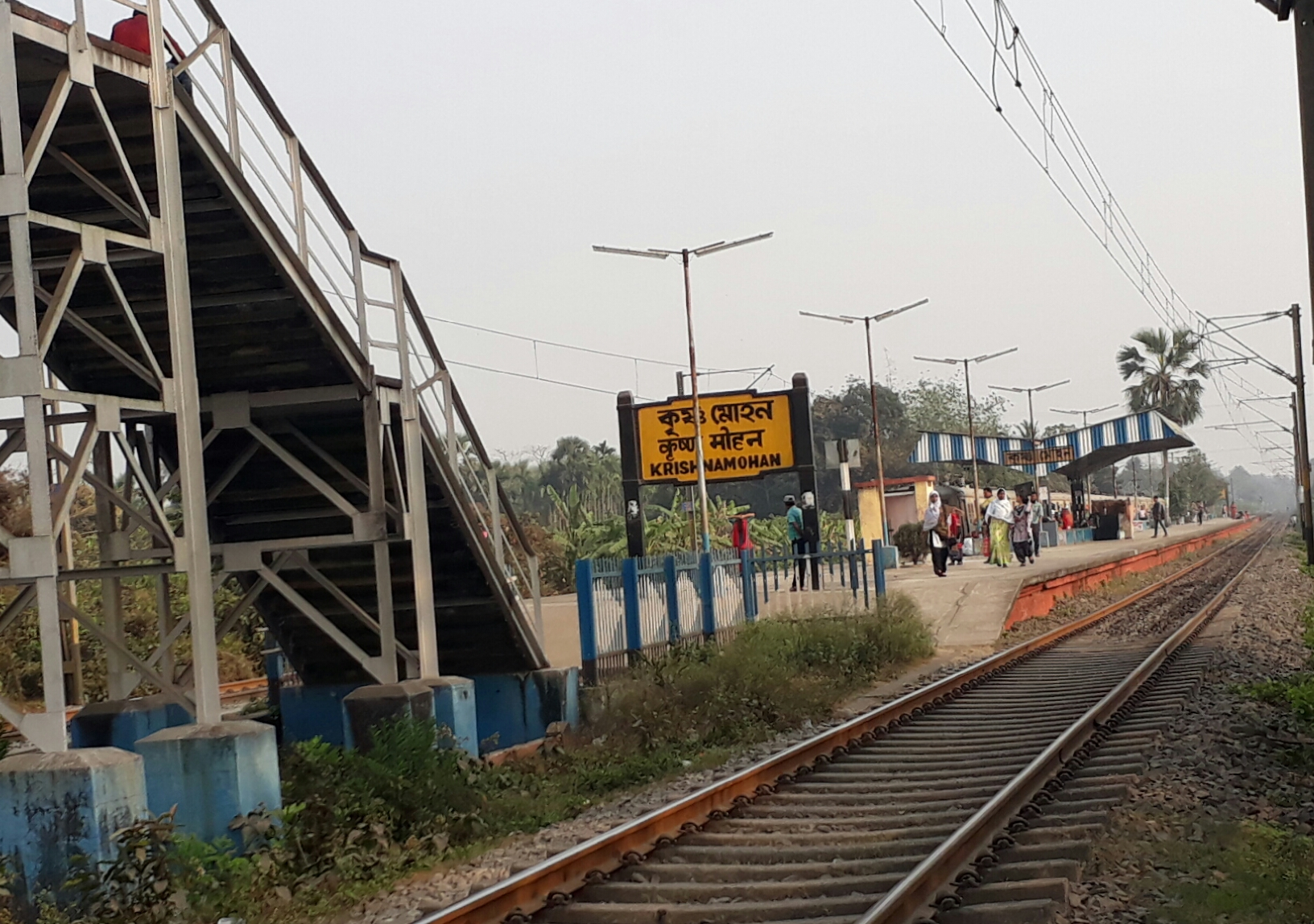
Krishna Mohan Halt Station, Sealdah south section.

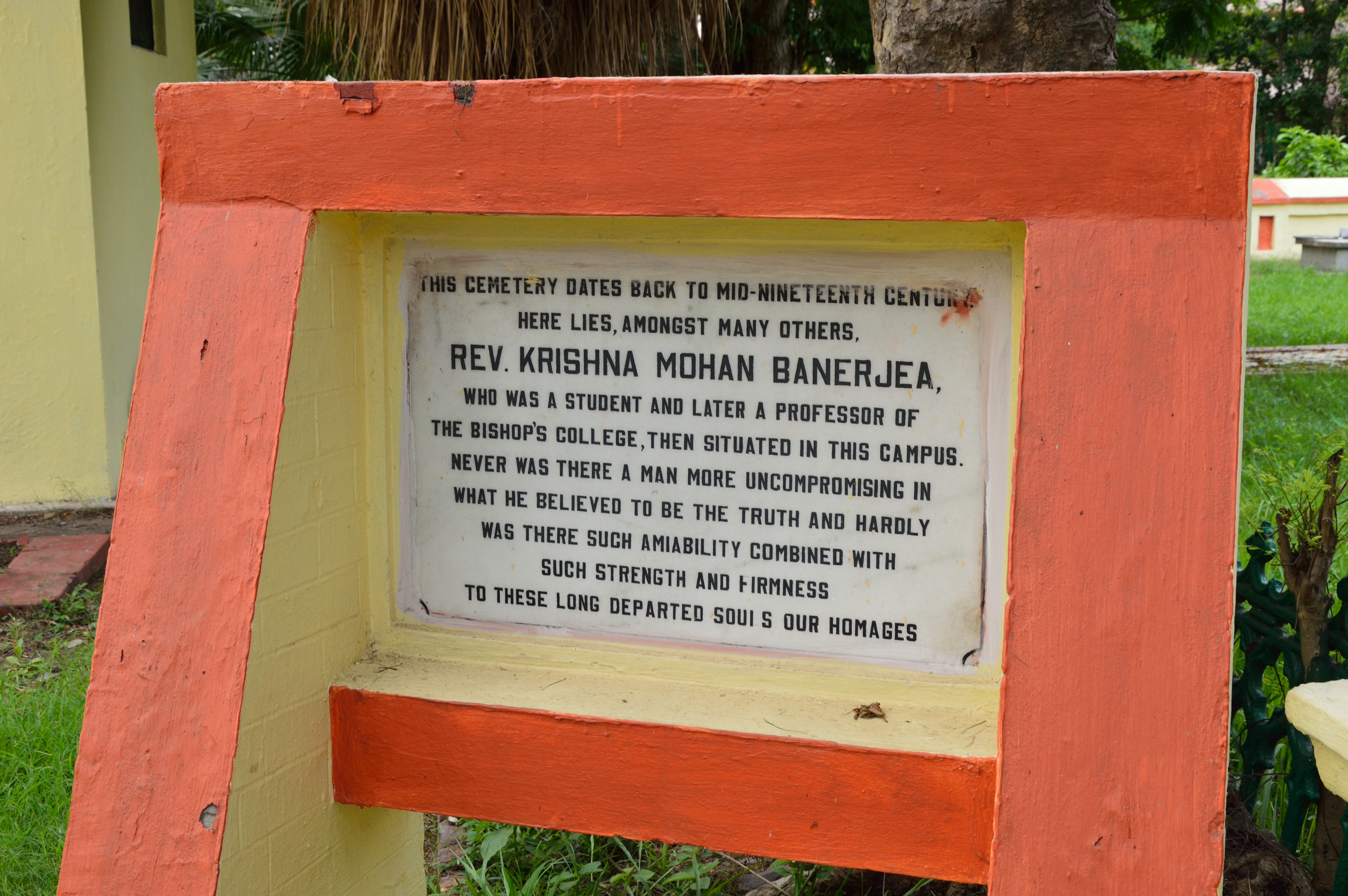
Gravestone of Banerjee at the Bengal Engineering and Science University

Krishna Mohan railway station in Sealdah South lines Baruipur - Lakshmikantapur route is named after Rev. Krishna Mohan Banerjee.
