= Bunyan Joseph =

Bishop of Anantapur-Kurnool Diocese, India

Bishop Bunyan Joseph, CSI Ayyagaru
- Bishop – in – Anantapur-Kurnool (now Rayalaseema Diocese)
- Church: Church of South India (A Uniting church comprising Wesleyan Methodist, Congregational, Presbyterian, Calvinist and Anglican missionary societies – SPG, WMMS, LMS, ABCFM, Basel Mission, CMS, and the Church of England)
- Diocese: Anantapur-Kurnool Diocese (now Rayalaseema Diocese)
- Appointed: 27 September 1947
- Predecessor: Position created
- Successor: H. Sumitra, CSI; Bishop - in - Rayalaseema
- Previous post: Canon

Orders
- Ordination: 1923 (as Deacon); 1924 (as Presbyter) by Vedanayagam Samuel Azariah
- Consecration: 27 September 1947 by Cherakarottu Korula Jacob (Presiding Bishop)
- Rank: Bishop

Personal details
- Born: S. Bunyan Joseph; 20 August 1894 Vempenta, Kurnool District, Andhra Pradesh
- Died: 25 October 1986 (aged 92) Secunderabad, Telangana, India
- Buried: SPG-St. Thomas Cemetery, Station Road, Secunderabad; 17°26′03.9″N 78°30′00.5″E
- Denomination: Christianity
- Parents: Smt. Miriamma (Mother), Sri Bunyan Gideon (Father)
- Occupation: Priesthood
- Education: Secondary grade teacher certificate, Theological training
- Alma mater: Government Training College, Rajahmundry, The SPG Theological College, Sullivans Gardens, Chennai, Dornakal Divinity School, Dornakal
- Motto: (Epitaph); Out of darkness into the marvellous light to behold Christ face to face forever.

Bishop Bunyan Joseph (20 August 1894 – 25 October 1986) was the first and only elected Bishop - in - Anantapur-Kurnool Diocese who was consecrated on 27 September 1947 and was among the 15 inaugural Bishops when the Church of South India was inaugurated at the CSI-St. George's Cathedral, Chennai. He was presented for consecration by The Venerable F. F. Gladstone and Canon T. Sithers. to the Presiding Bishop Cherakarottu Korula Jacob, who as the first Moderator, consecrated Bunyan Joseph.

Bunyan Joseph began ministering since the 1920s in parts of Andhra Pradesh and in line with the Indian ethos, he made use of the Tanpura, presenting the Gospel in Telugu language through a Hymn. There are 7 hymns composed by Bunyan Joseph which have been included in the Christian Hymnal in Telugu language. As observed by the Christian Artist P. Solomon Raj, the Hymnal has been of high literary standard consisting of hymns in Telugu set in music patterns of Carnatic music and Hindustani classical music. The Missiologist Roger E. Hedlund notes that together with the Bible, the Hymnal has also gained usage equally with the Bible to both the literate and the illiterate. The Old Testament Scholar, G. Babu Rao reiterates the significance of the hymn in making a plain listener understand the message of the Gospel. Though it may outwardly seem nothing, the inherent technique adopted in composing such a hymn required much understanding of the scriptures and the context. An insight into the spiritual formation of Bunyan Joseph brings forth facets of sound theological grounding at both the SPG Theological College in Madras (Tamil Nadu) under Oxbridge Scholars and later at the Divinity School at Dornakal (Telangana), under the able bishopric of Vedanayagam Samuel Azariah.

== Life and times ==
Bunyan Joseph was an Anglican Priest of the Diocese of Dornakal under the bishopric of Vedanayagam Samuel Azariah and it was here that Bunyan Joseph became a Deacon and Presbyter in 1923 and 1924 respectively. He composed Hymns in Telugu language and prior to becoming the Bishop, he was a Theological Tutor at the Divinity Schools in Dornakal and Giddalur and had already become a Canon.

=== in Madras ===
A couple of days' prior to 27 September 1947, the photographer Mark Kaufman of Life (magazine) undertook a photo shoot of few personalities at Madras that included Joseph Bunyan. It was J. S. M. Hooper, then General Secretary of the Bible Society of India who preached the inaugural sermon at the cathedral. It is said that the cathedral and its surroundings were packed with nearly 5,000 people that day. There were a total of 15 Bishops who were consecrated, among them 9 were first time Bishops,

- Bunyan Joseph, Bishop - in - Anantapur-Kurnool,
- Frank Whittaker, Bishop - in - Medak,
- Hospet Sumitra, Bishop - in - Cuddapah
- Premaka Gurushantha, Bishop - in - Mysore,
- T. G. Stuart Smith, Bishop - in - North Travancore, Cochin and Malabar,
- Arnold Legg, Bishop - in - South Travancore,
- Edgar Bentley Thorp, Bishop - in - Trichy-Tanjore
- James Edward Lesslie Newbigin, Bishop - in - Madura and Ramnad,
- Sabapathy Kulendran, Bishop - in - Jaffna,

The remaining 6 were already Bishops in their erstwhile dioceses until their integration into the union,

- Anthony Blacker Elliott, Bishop - in - Dornakal,
- Yeddy Muthyalu, Bishop - in - Krishna-Godavari, and
- Cherakarottu Korula Jacob, Bishop - in - Cochin and Malabar,
- Arthur Michael Hollis, Bishop - in - Madras,
- George Theodore Selwyn, Bishop - in - Tirunelveli,
- Herbert Pakenham-Walsh (Diocese unassigned).

=== in Nandyal ===
The bishopric to which Bunyan Joseph was appointed was already mired in a problem of dependency and the entire Church union did not go well with the congregations who were ignorant about it and refused to join the union. The bishopric of Bunyan Joseph was short lived and he had to relinquish the Cathedra on 2 August 1949 due to manifold reasons which is best known as the Nandyal Problem. It was during his oversight of the ecclesiastical jurisdiction that brought him in interaction with B. E. Devaraj and Emani Sambayya.

A couple of decades later, Constance M. Millington took up Nandyal Problem as her doctoral dissertation at the University of Leeds in 1990. Much later, S. J. Sampath Kumar, a researcher at the Sri Krishnadevaraya University, took up research on the history of the Rayalaseema diocese in 2002 and had also covered the life and times of Bunyan Joseph.

In retrospect, L. W. Brown, writing in The Churchman in 1951 about the initial three years' of the formation of the Church of South India, between the two biennial Church of South India Synods, highlighted the issues in Anantapur-Kurnool Diocese, with special reference to the bishopric of Joseph Bunyan.

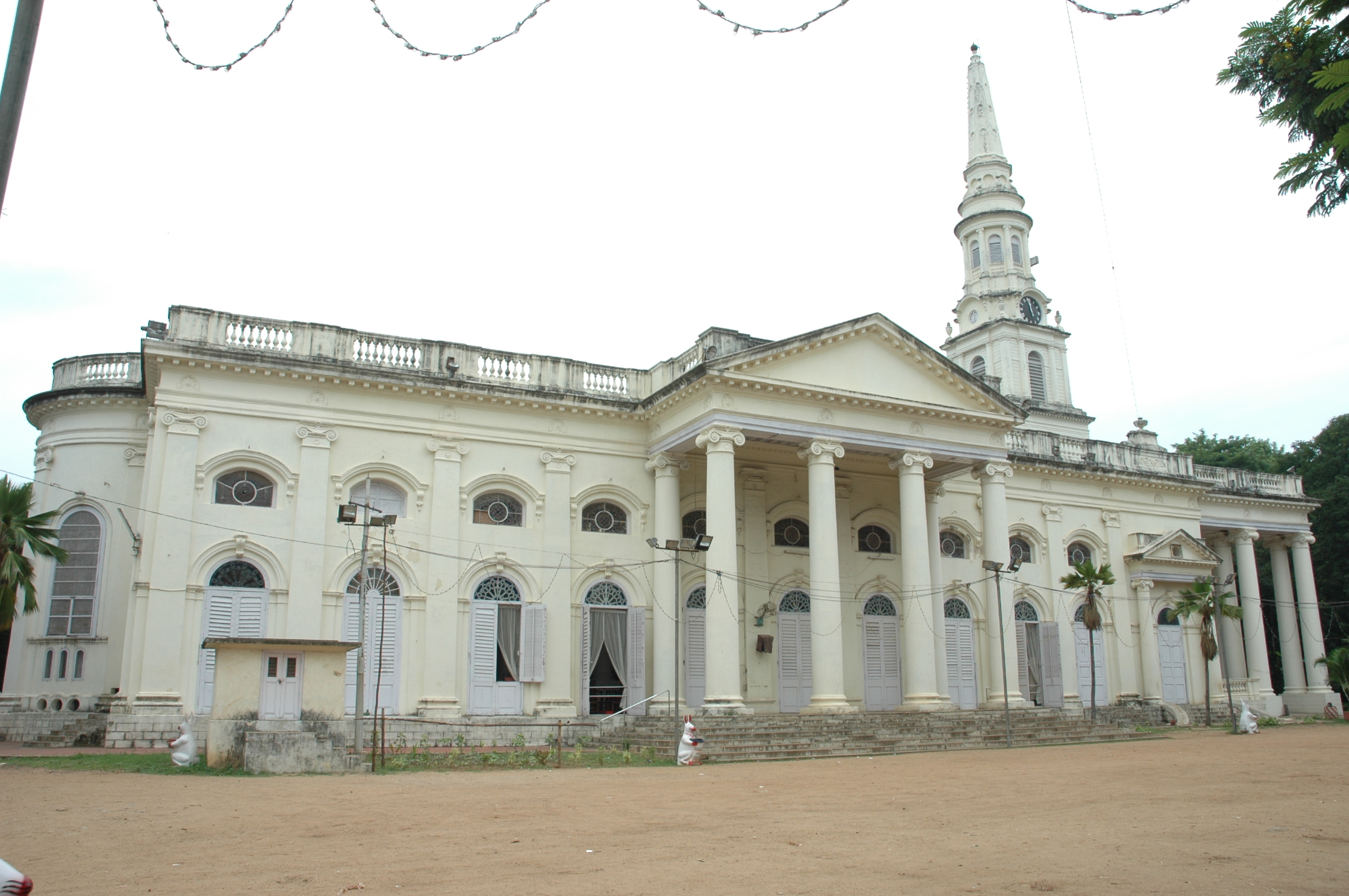
The CSI-St. George's Cathedral, Chennai. Bunyan Joseph was consecrated in this cathedral on 27 September 1947.

Finally in 1952, after more than two years of confrontation with the Church of South India, Bishop Bunyan Joseph came in full communion with it. Constance M. Millington writes,

Early in 1952, a delegation from S.P.G. visited India and went to Nandyal to study the situation there. Bishop Joseph decided to withdraw his opposition to the Commisary being Manager of the Schools and promised to withdraw his signature which was so vital to the Court case. The decision of Bishop Joseph gave cause for much rejoicing, far more for its spiritual than its legal implications. Once he had withdrawn from the court case, he was no longer defying the Moderator and Executive Committee of C.S.I. and they could be reconciled with him.

=== in Secunderabad ===
After Bunyan Joseph returned to the fold of the CSI in 1952, Arthur Michael Hollis, then Moderator, invited him to be Assistant Bishop - in - Madras. Bunyan Joseph chose to proceed to Secunderabad where Frank Whittaker, then Bishop - in - Medak accommodated him in Medak Diocese made him as Assistant Bishop. Bunyan Joseph also served as Presbyter during the period 1956-1957 and 1960-1961 at the CSI-Church of St. John the Baptist in Secunderabad. Rajaiah David Paul recorded that Bunyan Joseph retired in August 1959 after attaining superannuation. However, he also recorded that it was only in October 1963 that he finally retired from active service of the Church.

== Hymn compositions and writings ==
=== Writings ===
During the 1970s, the Board of Theological Education of the Senate of Serampore College, then in Bangalore under the stewardship of Hunter P. Mabry, H. S. Wilson, and Zaihmingthanga planned to prepare a comprehensive bibliography of original Christian writings in India in vernacular languages. Subsequently, Ravela Joseph was appointed in the 1980s to take up the task of gathering material from as many sources as possible across the Telugu-speaking states. The search for such vernacular Christian writings and compositions from institutions of the Catholic, Protestant, the New and Indigenous Churches and individual authors and composers gathered steam and finally concluded in the 1990s by which time Suneel Bhanu also assisted in the initiative. The Bibliography of Original Christian Writings in India in Telugu was published in 1993 and includes the following two writings by Bunyan Joseph,

Year^{[A]}	Title In English / తెలుగు^{[B]}	Publisher	Compiler's source	Compiler's thematic arrangement
1954	Sangha Jyoti: Light of the Church / సంఘ జ్యోతి	Andhra Christian Council, Dornakal	ACTC, Secunderabad	Church, Ministry and Sacraments
1965	Satya Jyothi: Torch of Truth / సత్య జ్యోతి	Self-published, Dornakal	ACTC, Secunderabad	Person and work of Jesus

=== Hymn compositions ===
As a Hymn writer, Bunyan Joseph composed many hymns and 7 of them find place in the Christian Hymnal in Telugu with the corresponding hymn numbers.

Hymn Number^{[A]}	Hymn In English / తెలుగు^{[B]}	Ragam	Tanam
29	O God, we praise you / ఓ దేవా, నిన్ను స్తుతించుచున్నాము	Sankarabharanam	Adi
48	Morning hymn / ఉదయగీతి	Anandabhairavi	Triputa
218	The resurrection of Christ / క్రీస్తు పునరుతానము	Mukhari	Ata
225	The ascension of Christ / క్రీస్తు ఆరోహణము	Anandabhairavi	Eka
574	Christian philanthropy / క్రైస్తవ దాతృత్వము	Nadhanamakriya	Ata
593	Palm Sunday / మట్టలాలాదివారము	Shankarabharana	Adi
597	The memory of All Saints / సర్వపరిశుద్దుల స్మరణ	Kalyani	Triputa

== Legacy and reminisce ==
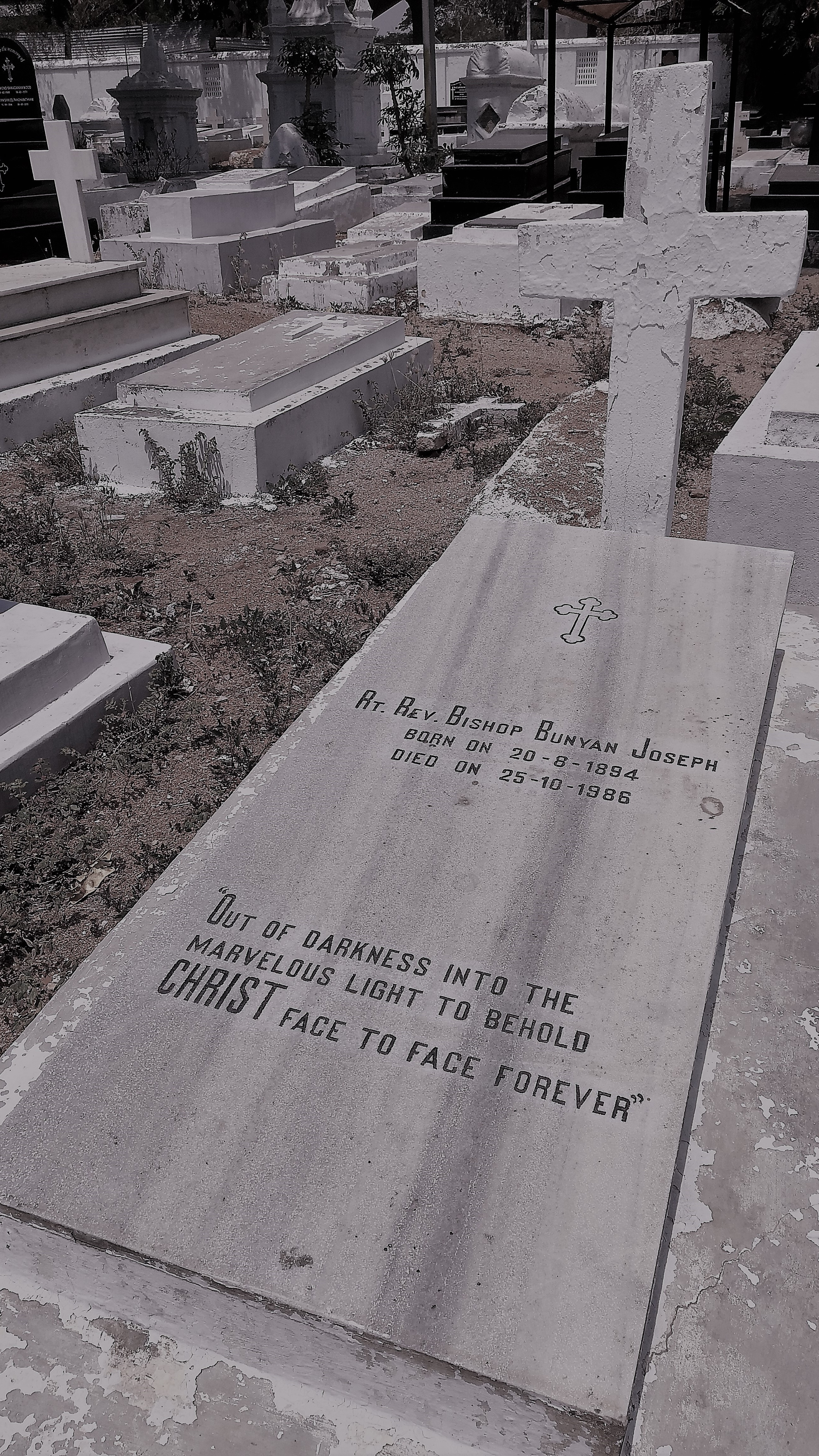
Tombstone of Bunyan Joseph at the SPG-St. Thomas Cemetery, Secunderabad.

It was said of Bunyan Joseph as being a bullock-cart Evangelist who tended the congregations not only through the word, but through deed and has been the inspiration behind Joshua Vision India. Scholastic and Collegiate level institutions in Nandyal supervised by the Nandyal Diocese have been named after Bunyan Joseph, namely,

- Bishop Bunyan Joseph School,
- Bishop Bunyan Joseph SPG Junior College,

Constance M. Millington, as part of her research, had visited Bunyan Joseph in the 1980s who by that time was in his nineties in Secunderabad and reminisces,

(Adapted) Bunyan Joseph spoke of his life and work in the Church, his interest in evangelism and his teaching of illiterate people through the use of Telugu lyrics. Before leaving, he prayed and I was conscious of being in the presence of a man of deep humility and great spiritual depth.

Religious titles
Preceded by Position created	Church of South India, Bishop – in – Anantapur-Kurnool, (Anantapur); 27 September 1947-2 August 1949	Succeeded by H. Sumitra, CSI; Bishop - in - Rayalaseema
Church of South India Diocese of Medak Ecclesiastical Titles
Preceded by F. C. Philip, 1951-1956, M. H. Durrani, 1958-1960	Presbyter - in - Charge, CSI-Church of St. John the Baptist, Secunderabad; 1956-1957, 1960-1961	Succeeded by F. C. Philip, 1957-1958, E. W. Gallagher & A.M. Palmer, 1961-1963
