= Ernest John =

- Bishop – in – Nandyal
- Church: Church of South India
- Diocese: Nandyal
- Predecessor: Clement Venkataramiah
- Successor: Puvvada John

Orders
- Consecration: 1967 at the CSI-Holy Cross Cathedral, Nandyal by The Most Reverend P. Solomon, Moderator, and the Right Reverend Lesslie Newbigin, Deputy Moderator

Personal details
- Born: Andhra Pradesh

Ernest John was Bishop - in - Nandyal from 1967 to 1974.

In 1967, the Most Reverend P. Solomon, then Moderator principally consecrated John at the CSI-Holy Cross Cathedral, Nandyal in the presence of the co-consecrator, Lesslie Newbigin, then Deputy Moderator of the Church of South India Synod.

Religious titles
Preceded by Clement Venkataramiah; 1963-1967	Bishop - in - Nandyal; Church of South India; 1967-1974	Succeeded by Puvvada John; 1977-1985
