= Peyyala Issac Vara Prasad =

Anglican Church Priest

Bishop P. I. Vara Prasad CSI
- Bishop – in – Rayalaseema
- Church: Church of South India (A Uniting church comprising Wesleyan Methodist, Congregational, Calvinist, Presbyterian and Anglican missionary societies – SPG, WMMS, LMS, Basel Mission, CMS, ABCFM and the Church of England)
- Diocese: Rayalaseema
- See: Church of South India
- In office: 22 February 2021 – present
- Predecessor: B. D. Prasada Rao, CSI
- Successor: Incumbent
- Previous post: Pastor - in - Gooty

Orders
- Ordination: 25 March 1993 as Deacon; 7 August 1993 as Presbyter by L. V. Azariah, CSI
- Consecration: 22 February 2021 by The Most Reverend Dharmaraj Rasalam, Moderator (Principal consecrator), The Right Reverend K. Reuben Mark, Deputy Moderator (Co-consecrator)
- Rank: Bishop

Personal details
- Born: Peyyala Issac Vara Prasad; 8 October 1962 (age 63) Andhra Pradesh
- Denomination: Christianity
- Residence: Kadapa
- Parents: Smt. Sarah Sarojini (Mother); Sri P. Abraham (Father)
- Education: B. Th. (Serampore)
- Alma mater: Andhra Christian Theological College, Secunderabad, Telangana

Bishop P. I. Vara Prasad (born 8 October 1962) is a silver jubilee Priest and current bishop of Rayalaseema Diocese of the Church of South India. Ever since his ordination as deacon/Presbyter in 1993 by then Bishop L. V. Azariah, he began his career as a Priest in Churches within ecclesiastical jurisdiction of CSI-Diocese of Rayalaseema that comprise parts of civil states of Andhra Pradesh and Telugu-speaking parts of Tamil Nadu. Vara Prasad is well versed in conducting mass, following Presbyterian, Congregational and Anglican rites.

== Ministerial formation ==
Vara Prasad undertook spiritual studies as a fully-resident seminarian at Andhra Christian Theological College, Secunderabad, affiliated to nation's first University, the Senate of Serampore College (University), where he studied Bachelor of Theology during the academic years 1989–1992. He studied at the seminary at a time when cycle of principalship was rolling over from Suppogu Joseph, STBC to M. Victor Paul, AELC, both of whom were New Testament Scholars. Co-faculty comprised Systematic Theologians, Regunta Yesurathnam, CSI, B. J. Christie Kumar, STBC, G. Dyvasirvadam, CSI, as well as P. Joseph, STBC and G. T. Abraham, CSI, who taught Christian Ministry.

With availability of international Scholars from Germany, Canada and United States, Vara Prasad was exposed to faculty, that composed of alumni from Universities of Hamburg, Montreal and Yale, Klaus Schäfer, EMS, Raymond Waldock, CBM and Tracy Greer Gipson, ABM. Communicative English and library accession system were enhanced with presence of LaVerne Louise-Waldock and Marjorie May Lynch-Gipson.

Much like any University Grants Commission-recognised institution, Vara Prasad learnt the nuances of academic learning in a semester system. He also learnt Biblical Greek and Biblical Hebrew from perhaps the best available Scholars in India in Serampore University system. During his three-year ministerial formation at Protestant Regional Theologiate in Secunderabad, Vara Prasad also came under the tutelage of Old Testament Scholar, G. Babu Rao, CBCNC,. Prasad was awarded a graduate degree during 1993 convocation of Senate of Serampore College (University), then under Registrarship of New Testament Scholar, D. S. Satyaranjan, IPC, held at Serampore College, Serampore.

== Career ==
=== Parish work ===
Vara Prasad's began serving in parishes under the Diocese after his ordination in 1993, that comprised Churches established by Reformed Church in America, London Missionary Society and Society for the Propagation of the Gospel. He was in Kamalapuram, Yerraguntla, Kadapa, Adoni, Anantapur, Guntakal, Pulivendula, among other parishes. Vara Prasad went about his priestly duties as Pastor in ecclesiastical jurisdiction of Rayalaseema under the care of able Servants, comprising L. V. Azariah, C. B. M. Frederick, K. B. Yesu Vara Prasad and B. D. Prasada Rao.

Vara Prasad was involved in both spiritual and healing ministries of the Church. Gradually, he began exhibiting leadership skills for the larger cause of the Church, which included conducting retreats and also representing the Diocese at Church of South India Synod.

=== Bishopric ===
Issac Vara Prasad had nearly 30 years of parish service and was a senior Priest in his diocese. He stood in fray for bishopric of the Diocese and was elected to the panel constituted by the CSI Synod. He was declared elected as Bishop by CSI Synod and was consecrated on 22 February 2021 at CSI Central Church, Kadapa by Moderator, Dharmaraj Rasalam (Principal Consecrator) and Deputy Moderator K. Reuben Mark (Co-consecrator), which was witnessed by a host of Bishops from adjoining dioceses.

== Writings ==
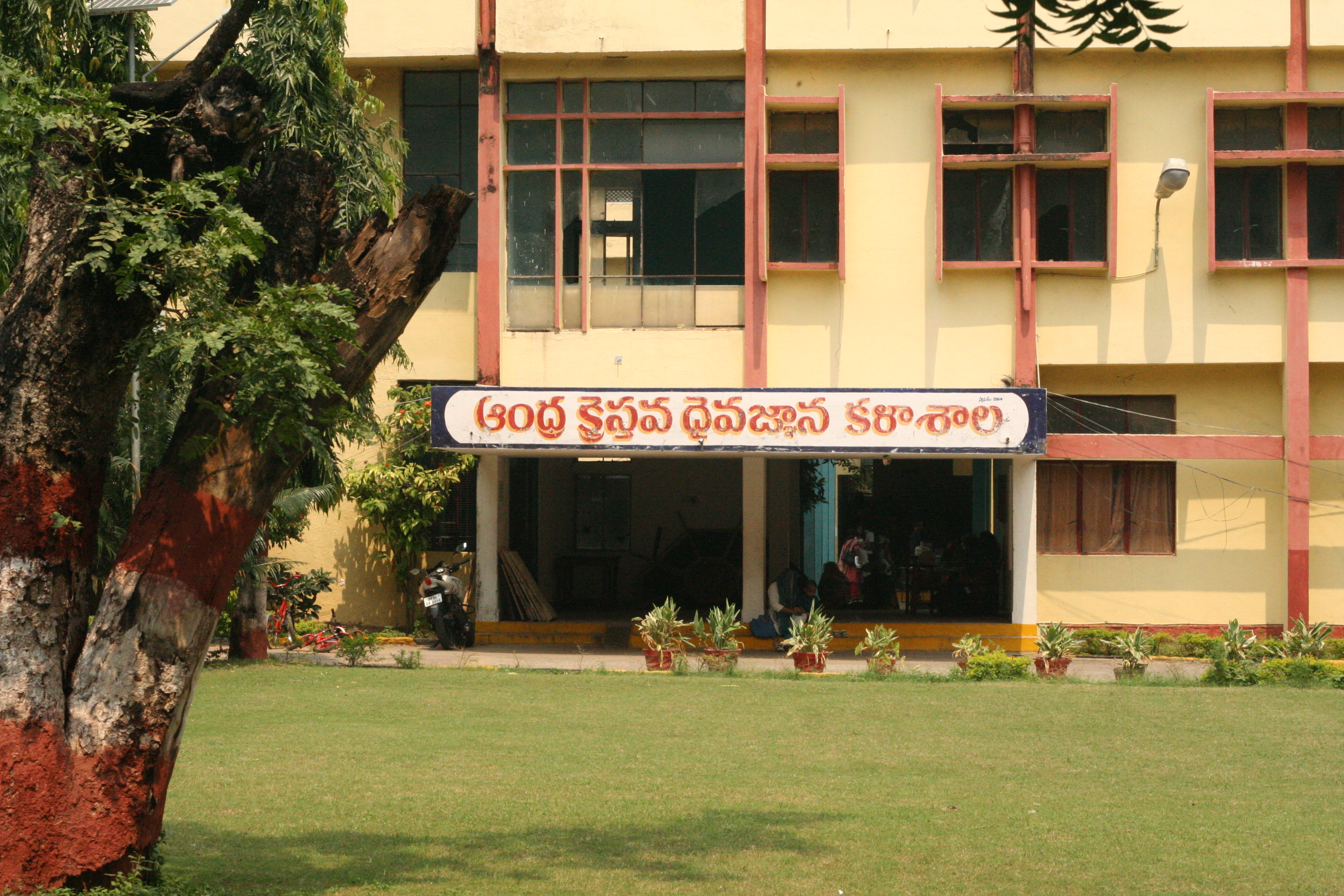
Protestant Regional Theologiate in Secunderabad; Vara Prasad studied here during 1989–1992.

Vara Prasad's parish ministry in Pulivendula brought him in contact with then Chief Minister, Y. S. Rajasekhara Reddy, whose family were members of CSI Church there. After coming to know about conversion experience of ancestors of YSR and their faith journey, he encouraged their family members to compile an autobiography, which could serve as a sourcebook of inspiration for others. Vara Prasad's interest in motivating his parishioners to document could perhaps be attributed to influence of his Spiritual Formators in Church History/History of Christianity comprising B. C. Paul, AELC, C. Yesupadam, AELC, D. J. Jeremiah, CBCNC, and K. L. Richardson, AELC, who taught at varying intervals back in his seminary days.

- Vara Prasad, P. I. (2010). "A Tribute to Y. S. Chinna Konda Reddy" (PDF). In Prasada Reddy, T. Sivarama (ed.). An Autobiography of Y. S. Chinna Konda Reddy. Y. S. Prakash Reddy. pp. 11–16.

== See also ==
Honorary titles
Preceded by B. D. Prasada Rao, CSI	Member, Board of Governors, Andhra Christian Theological College, Secunderabad; 2021–present	Succeeded by Incumbent
Religious titles
Preceded by B. D. Prasada Rao, CSI	Bishop - in - Rayalaseema; Kadapa; 2021-present	Succeeded by Incumbent
