= Solomon Doraiswamy =

- Bishop – in – Trichy-Tanjore Diocese of the Church of South India (1964-1982)
- Church: Christian
- Diocese: Trichy-Tanjore Diocese of the Church of South India
- See: Church of South India
- In office: 1964-1982
- Predecessor: E. B. Thorp
- Successor: Rajamanickam Paulraj
- Previous post(s): Pastor, Diocese of Madras of the Church of South India (-1964)

Orders
- Ordination: by Arnold Legg
- Consecration: by Arnold Legg, Moderator; Co-consecrator, P. Solomon, Deputy Moderator

Bishop Solomon Doraiswamy was the second Bishop-in-Trichy-Tanjore Diocese of the Church of South India whose bishopric lasted from 1964 to 1982.

Doraiswamy elected as the second Bishop - in - Trichy-Tanjore Diocese of the Church of South India who was principally consecrated in 1964 by Moderator, Arnold Legg and co-consecrated by P. Solomon, the Deputy Moderator.

During the fourteenth Church of South India Synod held from 10–14 January 1974 at the Women's Christian College, Madras, Doraiswamy was elected as the Deputy Moderator and held the office from 1974 to 1980 for over three terms (1974-1976; 1976-1978 and 1978-1980). Again during the seventeenth Church of South India Synod held from 10–14 January 1980 at Madras Christian College, Tambaram, Doraiswamy became the Moderator and held the office for a term up to 1982.

Doraiswamy retired from the bishopric in 1982 on attaining superannuation. The Senate of Serampore College (University) awarded an honorary doctorate degree upon Doraiswamy in 1981.

Awards and achievements
Preceded by J. T. Krogh; W. B. Harris; 1978	Senate of Serampore College (University); Doctor of Divinity Honoris Causa; 1981	Succeeded by Aharon Sapsezian; 1982
Religious titles
Preceded by E. B. Thorp; 1947-1963	Bishop - in - Trichy-Tanjore Diocese; Church of South India; 1964-1982	Succeeded by Rajamanickam Paulraj; 1982-1998
Preceded by Lesslie Newbigin; 1966-1974	Deputy Moderator; Church of South India Synod; 1974-1980	Succeeded by I. Jesudasan; 1980-1982
Preceded by N. D. Ananda Rao Samuel; 1972-1980	Moderator; Church of South India Synod; 1980-1982	Succeeded by I. Jesudasan; 1982-1988
