= Boyineni Deva Prasada Rao =

Bishop Emeritus B. D. Prasada Rao CSI
- Bishop Emeritus – in – Rayalaseema
- Church: Church of South India (A Uniting church comprising Wesleyan Methodist, Congregational, Lutheran, Calvinist and Anglican missionary societies – SPG, WMMS, LMS, Basel Mission, CMS, and the Church of England)
- Diocese: Rayalaseema
- See: Church of South India
- In office: 2013-2019
- Predecessor: K. B. Yesu Vara Prasad
- Successor: P. Issac Vara Prasad
- Previous post: Pastor - in - Madanapalle

Orders
- Ordination: 4.11.1979 as Deacon; 20.12.1980 as Presbyter
- Consecration: 5.5.2013 by The Most Reverend G. Devakadasham, Moderator, The Right Reverend G. Dyvasirvadam, Deputy Moderator
- Rank: Bishop

Personal details
- Born: Boyineni Deva Prasada Rao; August 13, 1952 Andhra Pradesh
- Denomination: Christianity
- Residence: Kadapa
- Education: B.Sc., B.Ed., M.A., B.D., M.Th.
- Alma mater: Andhra Christian Theological College, Secunderabad, Telangana; United Theological College, Bangalore, Karnataka

Bishop B. D. Prasada Rao (born 13.8.1952) is Bishop Emeritus - in - Rayalaseema Diocese of the Church of South India and past ex officio member of the Church of South India Synod for the period 2013-2019. He retired on attaining superannuation on 13 August 2019.

== Ministerial formation ==
After early scholastic and collegiate studies leading to degrees in Sciences and Education, Prasad Rao discerned his avocation towards priesthood.

=== Graduate ===
Prasada Rao had his ministerial formation at the Andhra Christian Theological College, Secunderabad, affiliated to the nation's first University, the Senate of Serampore College (University), where he studied Bachelor of Divinity during the years 1976-1979 under learned faculty, notably, Victor Premasagar, CSI, G. Solomon, STBC and G. Babu Rao, CBCNC then Old Testament Scholars at the Protestant Regional Theologiate in Secunderabad after which the Senate of Serampore College (University) awarded him a graduate degree under the Registrarship of D. S. Satyaranjan, IPC.

=== Post graduate ===
After serving in parishes in Rayalaseema, Prasad Rao was sent for postgraduate studies to the United Theological College, Bangalore, where he studied Master of Theology degree from 1987-1989 during the Principalship of E. C. John, a leading Old Testament Scholar. Rao worked out a dissertation entitled The socio-cultural approach to Christian education: Guidelines for a curriculum for youth in Rayalaseema diocese of the Church of South India During the successive convocation of the University, Prasad Rao was awarded a degree again during the Registrarship of D. S. Satyaranjan, IPC. In 1999, Prasad Rao's article, Pastoral Care to the Pastors appeared in the National Council of Churches Review.

== Bishopric ==
On 5 May 2013, the Most Reverend G. Devakadasham, Moderator principally consecrated Prasad Rao with other co-consecrator, the Right Reverend G. Dyvasirvadam, Deputy Moderator at the CSI-Christ Church/Cathedral, Kadapa.

Honorary titles
Preceded by K. B. Yesu Vara Prasad, CSI	Member, Board of Governors, Andhra Christian Theological College, Secunderabad; 2013–present	Succeeded by P. Issac Vara Prasad
Religious titles
Preceded by K. B. Yesu Vara Prasad, CSI	Bishop - in - Rayalaseema; Kadapa; 2013-2019	Succeeded by P. Issac Vara Prasad
