= Stanley Jedidiah Samartha =

Indian theologian

Stanley Jedidiah Samartha ಸ್ಟಾನ್ಲಿ ಜೆದಿದಿಃ ಸಮರ್ಥ
- Born: 7 October 1920; Karkala, Karnataka, India
- Died: 22 July 2001 (aged 80); Bengaluru, Karnataka, India
- Other names: Samartha
- Education: St. Aloysius College, Mangalore (B.A.); United Theological College, Bengaluru (BD); Union Theological Seminary in the city of New York (S.T.M.); Hartford Theological Seminary, Hartford (PhD)
- Spouse: Iris Edna Samartha
- Children: 3
- Church: Church of South India, Diocese of Karnataka Central
- Ordained: 30 March 1952
- Congregations served: Udupi; Bengaluru
- Offices held: Director; Dialogue with People of Living Faiths and Ideologies, World Council of Churches; Theological Teacher; Serampore College, Serampore; United Theological College, Bengaluru; Basel Evangelical Mission Theological Seminary (now Karnataka Theological College), Mangalore
- Title: Reverend Doctor

Stanley Jedidiah Samartha (Kannada: ಸ್ಟಾನ್ಲಿ ಜೆದಿದಿಃ ಸಮರ್ಥ; 7 October 1920 – 22 July 2001) was an Indian theologian and a participant in inter-religious dialogue.

Samartha's major contribution was through the World Council of Churches (WCC) sub-unit "Dialogue with People of Living Faiths and Ideologies" of which he was the first director.

Western Scholars on Hinduism like Jan Peter Schouten brings Samartha in the line of thinking of M. M. Thomas (an Indian thinker) and Raimundo Panikkar (a Catholic Priest) terming them as the "Great Three" of whom Samartha was very involved in the developments in the Church in India.

== Early life and education ==
Stanley Jedidiah was born on 7 October 1920 in Karkala, Karnataka into a pastoral family. His mother was a primary school Teacher while his father was a Pastor with the Basel Evangelical Mission. Stanley had his education at the Basel Evangelical Mission High School after which he enrolled at the local Government College. Later in 1939 he joined the Jesuit St. Aloysius College (then affiliated to the University of Madras) from where he obtained a B.A. in 1941.

== Divinity ==
It felt natural for Stanley to follow in the footsteps of his father, a Pastor. The Basel Evangelical Mission Board approved his candidature for theological studies and sent him to the United Theological College, Bengaluru in 1941. While pursuing theology, Stanley was afflicted with typhoid which kept him out of the Seminary for a year. While at the Seminary, Samartha came under the influence of his Professors, particularly Marcus Ward and P. D. Devanandan. In 1945, he was awarded the graduate degree of BD from the Seminary.

=== Pastor and lecturership ===
From 1945 to 1947, Stanley served as an Assistant to the Pastor in Udipi. Stanley was appointed as lecturer in the Basel Evangelical Mission Theological Seminary (now Karnataka Theological College), Mangalore beginning from the academic year 1947 – 1948 to teach Theology and Religions. After availing study leave for the period 1949–1952 Samartha returned to the Seminary and resumed teaching responsibilities.

The Basel Evangelical Mission ordained S. J. Samartha on 30 March 1952.

In 1952, the Seminary made Samartha its Principal, a position in which he continued up to 1960. In fact, he was the Seminary's first Indian Principal. It was during Samartha's period at Mangalore that the Seminary became affiliated to the Senate of Serampore College (University), West Bengal.

=== Higher studies ===
The Basel Evangelical Mission sent Stanley to the Union Theological Seminary in the city of New York for post-graduate studies (S.T.M.) in 1949. He studied under Paul Tillich, the Christian existentialist Philosopher and worked out a thesis titled The Hindu View of History According to Dr. S. Radhakrishnan which eventually got published.

In 1950, Stanley enrolled as a doctoral candidate at the Hartford Theological Seminary, Connecticut and was awarded a PhD in 1951. Samartha's doctoral thesis was entitled The Modern Hindu View of History according to Representative Thinkers.

After completion of doctoral studies at Hartford Theological Seminary in 1951, Samartha spent a year at Basel, Switzerland at the invitation of the Basel Mission Board. Being at Basel seemed to have thrilled Samartha since it was the very mission board through which his parents came to Christ. While spending his days here, he also began attending Karl Barth's weekly lectures at the University of Basel besides visiting the local congregations in Switzerland as well as in Germany. It was here that he also met Hendrik Kraemer, the Dutch Reformed Theologian and the first Director of the Ecumenical Institute, Bossey.

=== Sabbatical ===
While being the Principal at Mangalore, Samartha availed a sabbatical and taught for an academic year (1957–1958) at his alma mater, the Hartford Theological Seminary before returning to Mangalore.

=== Professorship ===
==== Bengaluru ====
In 1960, Samartha moved to the United Theological College, Bengaluru where he began teaching Philosophy and History of Religions.

==== Serampore ====
William Stewart had been the Principal of Serampore College from 1959 to 1966. The Council of Serampore College appointed Samartha as the Principal of Serampore College {the only constituent college of the Senate of Serampore College (University)} in 1966. Samartha led the college through turbulent times up to 1968 after which he took up an assignment with the World Council of Churches. Among those who studied under his Principalship in Serampore included James Massey, S. Jeyapaul David and G. Babu Rao.

== Appraisal by other Scholars ==
- Israel Selvanayagam, Principal, United Theological College, Bengaluru.

.....What is imperative for him (Samartha) is 'dialogue', which he defines as 'a mood, a spirit, an attitude of love and respect towards neighbours of other faiths. It regards partners as persons, not as statistics. Understood and practised as an intentional life-style, it goes far beyond a sterile co-existence or uncritical friendliness'.

- Andreas Anangguru Yewangoe of Indonesia:

..... Samartha was a productive thinker who was interested not only in theological, but also historical and philosophical problems, who paid much attention to Western thinkers as well as to such Indian philosophers as Vivekananda, Radhakrishnan, and Gandhi. He was trying to "dialogue" with these ideas, and to come to his own interpretation of Christ within the Indian context.

- Hans Schwarz, University of Regensburg, Germany.

.....For Samartha, there could not be any Christology without theology and no Christian theology apart from Jesus Christ but there can be and are theologies without reference to Jesus Christ namely in other religions. Samartha asserted that to ignore or deny this fact was like being insensitive to the faiths of our neighbours.

- Veli-Matti Kärkkäinen, Professor of Systematic Theology, Fuller Theological Seminary, Pasadena.

.....Stanley J. Samartha sees in the coming of Jesus Christ part of "God's dialogue with humanity." Our dialogue with people of other faiths is part of our participation in God's dialogue with humanity. And since Jesus Christ came to create a new kind of community "through forgiveness, reconciliation, and a new creation," dialogue is necessary to incorporate others into that community. Participants in the dialogue can trust the Holy Spirit to lead all into truth.

- Timothy Yates, an Anglican Evangelical Missiologist, Durham.

.....Samartha made the proposal that to overcome the personal-impersonal divide between Christianity and Eastern religions, Hindu and Buddhist, the Eastern approach to truth as 'impersonal' be viewed instead as 'trans-personal' or 'supra-personal'. He was no doubt aware that there has been a strand of Orthodox theological tradition which has used the impersonal in relation to God in the interests of stressing the mystery of the Godhead.

- Kirsteen Kim, Past Lecturer, Union Biblical Seminary, Pune.

.....Samartha stressed that dialogue takes place 'in community' because discussion does not centre on 'other faiths' as religious systems but on their adherents, whom Samartha called 'our neighbours of other faiths'. Thus he stressed the experiential nature of dialogue and was concerned not so much with 'systems of thought' as with 'living faiths'. In Samartha's view, though seeking truth is the aim of dialogue, truth can only be an issue when mutual respect of one another's convictions has first been reached; that is, a pluralist approach in which no one tradition can claim a monopoly on truth is a prerequisite for dialogue. However, he was at pains to point out that this does not mean that the partners in dialogue suspend their respective religious commitments since dialogue is a combination of 'commitment with openness'.

== Contribution ==
Samartha was acknowledged as a leading authority on inter-religious dialogue. S. Wesley Ariarajah quotes Samartha on dialogue:

Dialogue is not a matter of discussion but of relationships. it has more to do with people than with ideas. Dialogue is a spirit, a mood, an attitude towards neighbours of other faiths. In a multi-religious country like India where the destinies of different religious communities are intertwined and where people of different religious persuasions and ideological convictions face the same human problems in the life of the nation we need to remove suspicion, and build up confidence and trust between people. Thus, in a community where people of different faiths live and work together, dialogue can become an expression of Christian neighbourliness and part of the Christian ministry in a pluralist world.

=== Criticism ===
Criticism wasn't too far. Sunand Sumithra in his doctoral dissertation defended at the University of Tübingen, Germany in 1981 criticised (page 217) the work of Samartha arguing that Samartha failed to project Christ's distinctness in a pluralistic context. However, Samartha responded that Sunand Sumithra was not aware of the beliefs of other faiths. Kirsteen Kim believed that Sunand Sumithra was indeed aware of the beliefs of others and only wanted to distinguish Christ from others.

Further, Sunand Sumithra in a book on Christian Theology from an Indian Perspective evaluated Samartha's writings. He summarised that Samartha resorted to Advaitic system not on theological grounds but on mere empirical enquiry.

Similarly, Ken Gnanakan of ACTS Institute, Bengaluru, argued that Samartha's writings failed to uphold the Biblical Text in a setting of theology of religions.

Sunand Sumithra and Ken Gnanakan may have been right in their argument if one looks into a recent doctoral work by Dirk Griffioen submitted to the Utrecht University where Dirk brings to light the fact that Samartha rejected the Dutch Reformed Theologian Hendrik Kraemer's version of Christology stating that it was Christomonistic and not theocentric.

Samartha first met Hendrik Kraemer in Bossey during his sabbatical in Basel.

== Stint at WCC ==
After being relieved as Principal of Serampore College, Serampore in 1968, Samartha served as Associate Secretary, Department of Studies in Mission and Evangelism in Geneva up to 1971 working closely with Hans-Jochen Margull, Professor of Missions at the University of Hamburg, Hamburg.

It was at the Central Committee meeting at Addis Ababa in 1971 that a sub-unit of the WCC Dialogue with People of Living Faiths and Ideologies was set up with Samartha as its first director. S. Wesley Ariarajah succeeded Samartha at the WCC.

== Honours ==
In 1982, the Karnataka Theological College, Mangalore brought out a festschrift in his honour edited by the then Principal Rev. Dr. C. D. Jathanna entitled Dialogue in Community: Essays in Honour of Stanley J. Samartha.

India's first University, the Senate of Serampore College (University) in West Bengal conferred upon Samartha an honorary doctorate in 1986

In the same year, the Utrecht University, Utrecht, The Netherlands also awarded him an honorary doctorate.

== Retirement and death ==
In 1980, Samartha returned to India after his stint in Geneva with the WCC was over and was Consultant to the Christian Institute for Study of Religion and Society (CISRS), Bengaluru and also visiting professor at the United Theological College, Bengaluru. After 1989, Samartha returned to India and got empanelled on South Asia Theological Research Institute's Committee supervising theses on Theology and Religions in Bengaluru.

A Press Release issued by the World Council of Churches Office of Communication on 24 July 2001 stated that Stanley Samartha died of prolonged illness on 22 July 2001 in Bengaluru.

=== Tributes ===
- Georges Lemopoulos, Acting general secretary (2001), World Council of Churches, Geneva.

.....Dr. Samartha is remembered with great respect and appreciation for his remarkable contribution to the ecumenical movement and his pioneering efforts in making the concern for dialogue with neighbours of other faiths an enduring commitment in the World Council of Churches...

Other offices
Preceded by -	Director Dialogue with People of Living Faiths and Ideologies; World Council of Churches; 1971–1981	Succeeded by S. Wesley Ariarajah; 1981–1991
Educational offices
Preceded by William Stewart; 1966	President Senate of Serampore College (University); 1967	Succeeded by Canon Emani Sambayya; 1968
Academic offices
Preceded by William Stewart; 1959–1966	Principal; Serampore College, Serampore; 1966–1968	Succeeded by A. K. Mundle; 1968–1969

== See also ==
- Rev. Dr B. V. Subbamma
- Rev. Yisu Das Tiwari
- Bishop N. D. Ananda Rao Samuel
- Rev. Fr. Dr D. S. Amalorpavadass
- Rev. Emani Sambayya
- Bishop Victor Premasagar
- Rev. Joshua Russell Chandran
