= Church of South India Synod =

Church of South India Synod is the highest administrative body of the Church of South India. The Synod (CSI Synod) governs the whole church and convenes the annual general meeting of CSI. The Moderator of the Synod is a Bishop who is a presiding officer of the election conducted in the Annual General Meeting. The elected board is normally to hold office for three years. Church of South India Trust Association was constituted as a legal holding body of the movable and immovable properties of the Church of South India. The CSITA was incorporated in 26 September 1947 under Section 26 of the Indian Companies Act 1913 (now Section 25 of the Indian Companies Act 1956) as a religious and charitable company which has no business character and with no profit motive. The properties of the Churches in Union have been transferred to CSITA.

== About the Synod ==
The CSI synod consists of bishops of 24 dioceses, presbyters and layman (both men and women) who are elected from the respective diocesan councils to the synod. The synod members will elect the apex body consisting of a Moderator, Deputy Moderator, general secretary and Treasurer. The Moderator is the spiritual and administrative head of the Church. Only Bishops are eligible to contest for the Moderator and Deputy Moderator posts. Pastors and lay members are eligible to contest for the remaining two posts of General Secretary and Treasurer. The ordinary session of the synod is held once every three years. The last synod meeting was held in January 2023 at Hubli. The practice has been to hold the meeting during the pongal holidays in mid January and over four days. Special meetings of the synod (between ordinary sessions) could also be convened by a decision of the Synod Executive. The Synod office is situated at CSI Center, Royapettah, Chennai.

== Synod Executive ==
As the Church of South India synod meets only once in every three years, the power of the Synod is mostly delegated to Synod Executive which is appointed by the Synod and which meets at least twice a year. The Synod Executive is a subset of Synod which has 107 members excluding the Officers of the Synod. The Synod Executive consists of 4 members each from the 24 dioceses of Church of South India, 3 nominees of the Moderator and 4 officers of the synod (Moderator, Deputy Moderator, General Secretary and Treasurer).

== Synod Working Committee ==
The Synod Working Committee is a subset of the Synod Executive and it consists of 24 members excluding the Officers of the Synod. The working committee has a representation of one member each from the 24 dioceses of Church of South India and 4 officers of the Synod. The Synod Working Committee meetings are held based on need basis and they are held in between Synod Executive meetings. All decisions of the Synod Working Committee must be ratified at a subsequent meeting of the Synod Executive.

== Church of South India Synod Participants ==
According to the Church of South India constitution the participants in the Synod belong to five categories:

- Bishops of the 24 dioceses and assistant bishops, if any.
- The Outgoing general secretary and treasurer.
- Two members of the CSI Order of Sisters,
- The President and General Secretary of the Women's Fellowship,
- Presbyters and lay persons representing the various dioceses who are elected by their dioceses to represent them at the Synod.
- 10 members nominated by the moderator

Dioceses send representatives based on a graded scale that starts with those having 10,000 baptised members sending two pastors and four lay persons while the maximum number of representatives to the synod come from dioceses with over 150,000 baptised members that send six presbyters and 11 lay persons.

According to the report of the 2014 synod meeting, there were 135 presbyters, 275 lay members and 22 bishops who participated in the synod. Other invitees to synod meetings include accredited visitors, heads of synod departments, fraternal delegates (representing various CSI affiliated bodies), special invitees, overseas guests and resource persons.

== Quorum ==
- The quorum is one-third of the total membership of which not less than two-thirds shall be lay members.

== Agenda ==
First day of the synod meeting consists of confirmation of minutes of the previous Synod, Appointment of various committees to oversee elections, Take up resolutions, moderator's address, general secretary's report and Election of the four Officers of the Synod (Moderator, Deputy Moderator, general secretary and Treasurer). The second, third and fourth days of the Synod consists of a series of presentations by the treasurer, heads of synod departments, special invitees, etc. and some limited question-answer sessions. The final act of each Synod is the formal installation of the new Officers of the Synod on the last day.

== Officers ==
Due to the Madras High Court's ruling, which invalidated the recent elections and identified procedural discrepancies at the Synod meeting held in Hubli in January 2023. The officers were elected for a three-year term at the Synod meeting in Hubli, January 2023. The Moderator and the Deputy Moderator position along with the position of General Secretary and Hon. Treasurer is currently vacant and awaiting election. The church is presently under the administration of court-appointed administrators, Justice R. Balasubramanian and Justice V. Bharathidasan, pending new elections for these key leadership roles.

== Missions and Committee ==
For proper guidance of the life and work of the Church the CSI Synod has set up various Commissions and Committees. The following are some of the important ones:

- Ministerial Committee: which deals with issues relating to the ordained ministry.
- Theological Commission: which deals with questions relating to the faith of the Church.
- Liturgy Committee: for advising the Church on matters relating to worship and orders of service for different occasions.
- Board of Mission and Evangelism: for promoting missionary outreach both within the CSI area and outside.
- Union Negotiations Committee: for negotiations with other churches towards wider union.
- Commission on Political Questions: for considering issues of justice and peace from the perspective of the Church's witness to the Gospel.

== List of Synod Meetings ==
Synodical Sessions of the Church of South India with years, venue and elected Moderator and Deputy Moderator
Session	Synod	Host diocese	Venue	Moderator	Deputy Moderator
I	1948	Madurai-Ramnad	Madurai	Michael Hollis, Bishop in Madras	Cherakarottu Korula Jacob, Bishop in Central Travancore
II	1950	Madras	Madras	Michael Hollis, Bishop in Madras	Frank Whittaker, Bishop in Medak
III	1952	Krishna-Godavari	Machilipatnam	Michael Hollis, Bishop in Madras	Hospet Sumitra, Bishop in Rayalaseema
IV	1954	Madras	Madras	Hospet Sumitra, Bishop in Rayalaseema	Lesslie Newbigin, Bishop in Madurai-Ramnad
V	1956	Trichy-Tanjore	Trichy	Hospet Sumitra, Bishop in Rayalaseema	Lesslie Newbigin, Bishop in Madurai-Ramnad
VI	1958	Kanyakumari	Nagercoil	Hospet Sumitra, Bishop in Rayalaseema	Lesslie Newbigin, Bishop in Madurai-Ramnad
VII	1960	Mysore	Bangalore	Hospet Sumitra, Bishop in Rayalaseema	Augustine Jebaraj, Bishop in Tinnevelly
VIII	1962	Tirunelveli	Palayamkottai	Arnold Legg, Bishop in South Travancore	Augustine Jebaraj, Bishop in Tinnevelly
IX	1964	Tirunelveli	Palayamkottai	Arnold Legg, Bishop in South Travancore	Pereji Solomon, Bishop in Dornakal
X	1966	Madhya Kerala	Kottayam	Pereji Solomon, Bishop in Dornakal	Lesslie Newbigin, Bishop in Madras
XI	1968	Coimbatore	Coimbatore	Pereji Solomon, Bishop in Dornakal	Lesslie Newbigin, Bishop in Madras
XII	1970	Madras	Tambaram	Pereji Solomon, Bishop in Dornakal	Lesslie Newbigin, Bishop in Madras
XIII	1972	Madras	Tambaram	I.R.H. Gnanadason, Bishop in Kanyakumari; Ananda Rao Samuel, Bishop in Krishna-Godavari	Ananda Rao Samuel, Bishop in Krishna-Godavari; Lesslie Newbigin, Bishop in Madras
XIV	1974	Madras	Madras	Ananda Rao Samuel, Bishop in Krishna-Godavari	Solomon Doraiswamy, Bishop in Trichy-Tanjore
XV	1976	Trichy-Tanjore	Trichy	Ananda Rao Samuel, Bishop in Krishna-Godavari	Solomon Doraiswamy, Bishop in Trichy-Tanjore
XVI	1978	Madhya Kerala	Kottayam	Ananda Rao Samuel, Bishop in Krishna-Godavari	Solomon Doraiswamy, Bishop in Trichy-Tanjore
XVII	1980	Madras	Tambaram	Solomon Doraiswamy, Bishop in Trichy-Tanjore	Isaiah Jesudason, Bishop in South Kerala
XVIII	1982	Vellore	Vellore	Isaiah Jesudason, Bishop in South Kerala	Sundar Clarke, Bishop in Madras
XIX	1984	Medak	Secunderabad	Isaiah Jesudason, Bishop in South Kerala	Sundar Clarke, Bishop in Madras
XX	1986	South Kerala	Trivandrum	Isaiah Jesudason, Bishop in South Kerala	Victor Premasagar, Bishop in Medak
XXI	1988	Madurai-Ramnad	Madurai	Victor Premasagar, Bishop in Medak	David Pothirajulu, Bishop in Madurai-Ramnad
XXII	1990	Karnataka North	Dharwad	Victor Premasagar, Bishop in Medak	Vasant P. Dandin, Bishop in Karnataka Northern
XXIII	1992	Tirunelveli	Palayamkottai	Ryder Devapriam, Bishop in Nandyal; Vasant P. Dandin, Bishop in Karnataka Northern	Jason Dharmaraj, Bishop in Tirunelveli
XXIV	1994	Trichy-Tanjore	Trichy	Vasant P. Dandin, Bishop in Karnataka Northern	Rajamanickam Paulraj, Bishop in Trichy-Tanjore
XXV	1996	Coimbatore	Coimbatore	Vasant P. Dandin, Bishop in Karnataka Northern	William Moses, Bishop in Coimbatore
XXVI	1998	Rayalaseema	Madanapalle	William Moses, Bishop in Coimbatore	Kunnumpurathu Samuel, Bishop in East Kerala
XXVII	2000	Medak	Secunderabad	Kunnumpurathu Samuel, Bishop in East Kerala	Peter Sugandhar, Bishop in Medak
XXVIII	2002	East Kerala	Melukavu	Kunnumpurathu Samuel, Bishop in East Kerala	Peter Sugandhar, Bishop in Medak
XXIX	2004	Karnataka Central	Bangalore	Peter Sugandhar, Bishop in Medak	Suputhrappa Vasantha Kumar, Bishop in Karnataka Central
XXX	2006	Karnataka Southern	Mysore	Peter Sugandhar, Bishop in Medak	Suputhrappa Vasantha Kumar, Bishop in Karnataka Central
XXXI	2008	Krishna-Godavari	Visakhapatnam	John Gladstone, Bishop in South Kerala	Christopher Asir, Bishop in Madurai Ramnad
XXXII	2010	Tirunelveli	Courtallam	Suputhrappa Vasantha Kumar, Bishop in Karnataka Central	Gnanasigamony Devakadasham, Bishop in Kanyakumari
XXXIII	2012	Kanyakumari	Kanyakumari	Gnanasigamony Devakadasham, Bishop in Kanyakumari	Govada Dyvasirvadam, Bishop in Krishna-Godavari
XXXIV	2014	Krishna-Godavari	Vijayawada	Govada Dyvasirvadam, Bishop in Krishna-Godavari	Thomas K. Oommen, Bishop in Madhya Kerala
XXXV	2017	Madhya Kerala	Kottayam	Thomas K. Oommen, Bishop in Madhya Kerala	Vadapalli Prasada Rao, Bishop in Dornakal
XXXVI	2020	Trichy-Tanjore	Tiruchirappalli	Dharmaraj Rasalam, Bishop in South Kerala	K. Reuben Mark, Bishop in Karimnagar

== See also ==
- Church of South India
- Synod
- Diocesan Synod
