= G. T. Abraham =

Indian bishop (1940–2018)

Bishop G. T. Abraham, CSI
- Bishop - in - Nandyal
- Church: Uniting church (Church of South India comprising Wesleyan Methodist, Congregational and Anglican missionary societies – SPG, WMMS, LMS, CMS, and the Church of England)
- Diocese: Nandyal
- Appointed: 28 December 1994
- In office: From 28 December 1994 through 25 September 2005
- Retired: 25 September 2005
- Predecessor: Ryder Devapriam, CSI
- Successor: P. J. Lawrence, CSI
- Previous post: Pastor

Orders
- Ordination: 1967 by Ernest John, CSI
- Consecration: 1994 by Moderator Vasanth P. Dandin, CSI (Principal Consecrator) and R. Paul Raj, CSI (Co-consecrator)
- Rank: Bishop

Personal details
- Born: Gondi Theodore Abraham Nossam, Andhra Pradesh
- Died: February 16, 2018 Nandyal
- Denomination: Christianity
- Residence: Nandyal
- Parents: Rev. G.T. Mark and Christianamma Patnam
- Occupation: Priesthood
- Education: Government Arts College, Cuddapah, United Theological College, Bangalore, Virginia Theological Seminary, Alexandria, Virginia

Sainthood
- Shrines: Love builds

G. T. Abraham (25 September 1940 - 16 February 2018) was Bishop - in - Diocese of Nandyal of the Church of South India. He also taught Christian Ministry at the Andhra Christian Theological College. Hyderabad

== Studies ==
Abraham studied sciences at the Government Arts College in Kadapa. He later enrolled at the United Theological College, Bengaluru and studied theology (B. D.) during 1962-1966 when Joshua Russell Chandran was the College Principal. As part of the University requirements, Abraham submitted a dissertation entitled An Estimate of the Missionary and Pastoral Ministry of Bishop Azariah from 1922 to 1945 after which the Senate of Serampore College (University) under the Registrarship of Chetti Devasahayam awarded him a graduate degree. Later, Abraham was assigned pastoral roles in the parishes of Nandyal Diocese. Abraham later undertook post-graduate studies in theology at the Virginia Theological Seminary in Alexandria, Virginia leading to a Master of Theology in 1983 and returned for parish work in the Diocese. He was later deputed to teach at the Andhra Christian Theological College, Hyderabad.

== Ecclesiastical ministry ==
=== Pastoral ===
In 1967, after the Diocese of Nandyal ordained Abraham, he pastored parishes within the Diocese which was still experimenting with the Society for the Propagation of the Gospel and the Church of North India and finally the Church of South India.

=== Teaching ===
During the Principalship of Suppogu Joseph, STBC at the Protestant Regional Theologiate in Secunderabad, Abraham joined as Faculty Member in 1987 and began teaching Theology to ministerial aspirants in a near-ecumenical setting of Anglicans, Baptists, Lutherans, Methodists, Wesleyan Methodists and others from the small and indigenous Churches during the teaching tenures of M. Victor Paul, AELC, G. Dyvasirvadam, CSI, R. Yesurathnam, CSI and other notable faculty that included the Serampore College {the only constituent College of the Senate of Serampore College (University)} duo, namely P. Joseph, STBC and the Old Testament Scholar, G. Babu Rao, CBCNC.

When Abraham joined the Andhra Christian Theological College in Secunderabad in 1987, he became the third Spiritual Formator to have taught at the Seminary, with the first two being, B. E. Devaraj and Ryder Devapriam who taught at Rajahmundry and Secunderabad during the 1960s and the 1970s respectively.

=== Bishopric ===
In 1992, Ryder Devapriam died during an overseas visitation to Germany leading to Sede vacante in the Diocese of Nandyal leading to the direct supervision of the ecclesiastical affairs by the Church of South India Synod led by Vasanth P. Dandin for nearly two years' until 1994 when the Synod conducted elections and declared Abraham as the Bishop.

After more than a decade of serving as Bishop - in - Nandyal, Abraham retired on attaining superannuation in 2005.

== Honours ==
While attending the Lambeth Conference, 1998, the Virginia Theological Seminary conferred upon Abraham an honorary doctorate at a special academic convocation on 27 July 1998 in Canterbury Cathedral's Crypt in Canterbury, Kent by Bishop Peter James Lee of Episcopal Diocese of Virginia.

Religious titles
Preceded by Ryder Devapriam, CSI; 25 August 1985 – 4 September 1992	Bishop - in - Nandyal; 28 December 1994 – 25 September 2005	Succeeded by P. J. Lawrence, CSI; 29 May 2006 –2012
