= P. J. Lawrence =

Indian Anglican bishop (born 1947)

Papathoti Joseph Lawrence
- Bishop – in – Nandyal
- Church: Christian
- Diocese: Nandyal
- See: Church of South India
- In office: 2006-2012
- Predecessor: G. T. Abraham
- Successor: Pushpa Lalitha
- Previous posts: Director, Institute for Theological and Leadership Development, United Church of Jamaica and Cayman Islands

Orders
- Consecration: May 29, 2006 at the CSI-Holy Cross Cathedral, Nandyal by The Most Reverend B. P. Sugandhar, Moderator

Personal details
- Born: Andhra Pradesh

Bishop Emeritus P. J. Lawrence (born 1947) was Bishop - in - Nandyal from 2006 to 2012.

== Ministerial formation ==
Lawrence underwent ministerial formation at the United Theological College, Bangalore, affiliated to the nation's first University, the Senate of Serampore College (University), where he studied Bachelor of Divinity from 1968-1971 under the Principalship of Joshua Russell Chandran.

Lawrence also studied a doctoral degree leading to Doctor of Ministry at the Columbia Theological Seminary in 2000. Lawrence's thesis was entitled St. James, Jamaica, "Toward a Caribbean Theology of Liberation: A Christian Response to Rastafarian Movement".

== Overseas assignment ==
Lawrence founded the Institute for Theological and Leadership Development, United Church of Jamaica and Cayman Islands. In 2003, he performed the marriage rites of 13 couples who went underwater for the marriage ceremony.

== Bishopric ==
On 29 May 2006, the Most Reverend B. P. Sugandhar, then Moderator principally consecrated Lawrence at the CSI-Holy Cross Cathedral, Nandyal.

Religious titles
Preceded by G. T. Abraham; 1994-2005	Bishop - in - Nandyal; Church of South India; 2006-2012	Succeeded by Pushpa Lalitha; 2013-

== Sale of Church lands ==
On 29 May 2006, the Most Reverend B. P. Sugandhar, then Moderator principally consecrated Lawrence at the CSI-Holy Cross Cathedral, Nandyal.

The Bishop of Nandyal in the Church of South India has denied accusations of misconduct put forward by an anti-corruption watchdog group. The claims put forward by the Christ Centered Campaign (CCC) that he was defrauding the diocese by “gifting” a church owned hospital to a private company were untrue, Bishop PJ Lawrence tells The Church of England Newspaper.

On March 31, the CCC, a lay led advocacy group that has led the charge against corruption in the Church of South India, released a statement accusing Bishop Lawrence of having “virtually gifted away the CSI-owned St. Werburgh’s “ Hospital “in the heart of Nandyal” to a foreign controlled “private limited company.”

On March 8, 2011 the bishop granted 4B Healthcare a 30 year lease to operate and manage St Werburgh’s Hospital. Built in 1931 by the Society for the Propagation of the Gospel to serve the city’s poor, the CCC said the hospital’s land, clinics and rental properties have a market value of £8.5 million.

In return for the lease, the Diocese of Nandyal is to receive “15 per cent of net surplus” from the operations or a minimum of Rs 25,000 (£350). The CCC claims that “no payments to the CSI are likely to materialize” as 4B Healthcare is given “sole control over accounting” in the contract, and has the right to deduct from its payments “any outstanding liabilities” for the hospital at the time of the takeover.

The CCC notes the contract gives 4B Healthcare the right to “develop the entire property by modifying, demolishing or putting up new buildings, equipment and facilities” and at the end of the lease “should the CSI want to get back the property it will have to first pay 4B for all the developments done on it.”

The anti-corruption watchdog also questioned the credentials of the buyer, noting that it had been formed in January 2010 by an American entrepreneur, who “a mere three days after the deal between 4B and the Nandyal Diocese was inked,” sold a 99 per cent interest in the company to Opportunity International Australia (OIA).

The CCC urged the CSI to “consider legally challenging the transfer of the Nandyal Hospital to a private company on terms that virtually ensure the hospital and its vast land bank are lost to CSI members forever.”

“This deal sets a very unhealthy precedent as it can be used to justify similar ‘virtual sales’ of valuable CSI property elsewhere,” the CCC said, adding that “for the many corrupt bishops who dominate the CSI this novel model shown by 4B could just be the answer they are seeking to circumvent the challenges a vigilant laity is throwing at them” to stop the stripping of the church’s assets.

Asked about the allegations, Bishop Lawrence told CEN he wished the CCC had “checked with me the fact before circulating such information” as “there is no truth in what they are saying.”

The 4B Healthcare deal was “done with the approval of the executive committee of our diocese for the good of the hospital,” the bishop said, and it was unfortunate that “a hand full of disgruntled people” were raising objections.

Bishop Lawrence added that the “so-called CCC is focusing on dissidents in every diocese to malign the bishops.”

The bishop stated that “anyone, including the CCC is welcome” to visit Nandyal “and get the facts.”
