= Peter Sugandhar =

Indian bishop (1944–2017)

Bishop B. P. Sugandhar, CSI B. D. (Serampore)
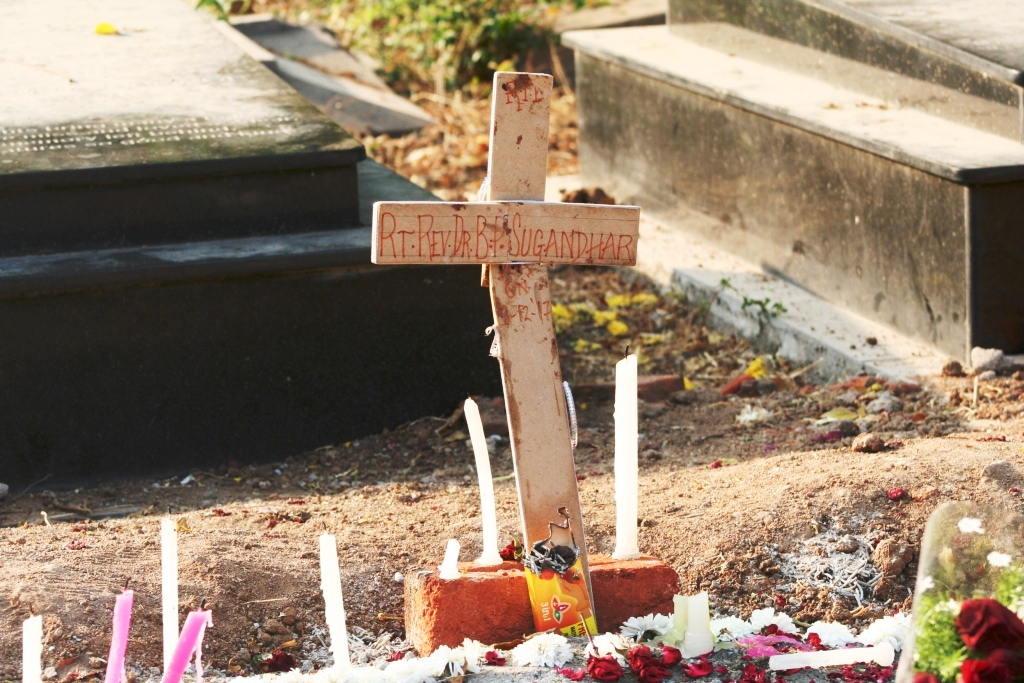
- Church: Church of South India (A Uniting church comprising Wesleyan Methodist, Congregational, Lutheran, Calvinist and Anglican missionary societies – SPG, WMMS, LMS, Basel Mission, CMS, and the Church of England)
- Diocese: Medak
- Elected: September 1993
- In office: 1993 - 2009
- Predecessor: Victor Premasagar, CSI
- Successor: T. S. Kanaka Prasad, CSI

Orders
- Ordination: 1969 by H. D. L. Abraham, CSI
- Consecration: September 1993 by Vasanth P. Dandin, CSI (Moderator and Principal consecrator) and Jason S. Dharamaraj, CSI (Deputy Moderator and co-consecrator)
- Rank: Bishop

Personal details
- Born: Badda Peter Sugandhar; 28 September 1944 Ramayampet
- Died: 5 December 2017 (aged 73) Secunderabad
- Buried: CSI-Church of St. John the Baptist Cemetery, Parade Grounds, Secunderabad Cantonment; 17°26′44″N 78°29′35″E
- Denomination: Christianity
- Parents: Smt. Vimalamma and Sri Christudas
- Profession: Priesthood
- Education: B. D. (Serampore)
- Alma mater: United Theological College, Bangalore (Karnataka)

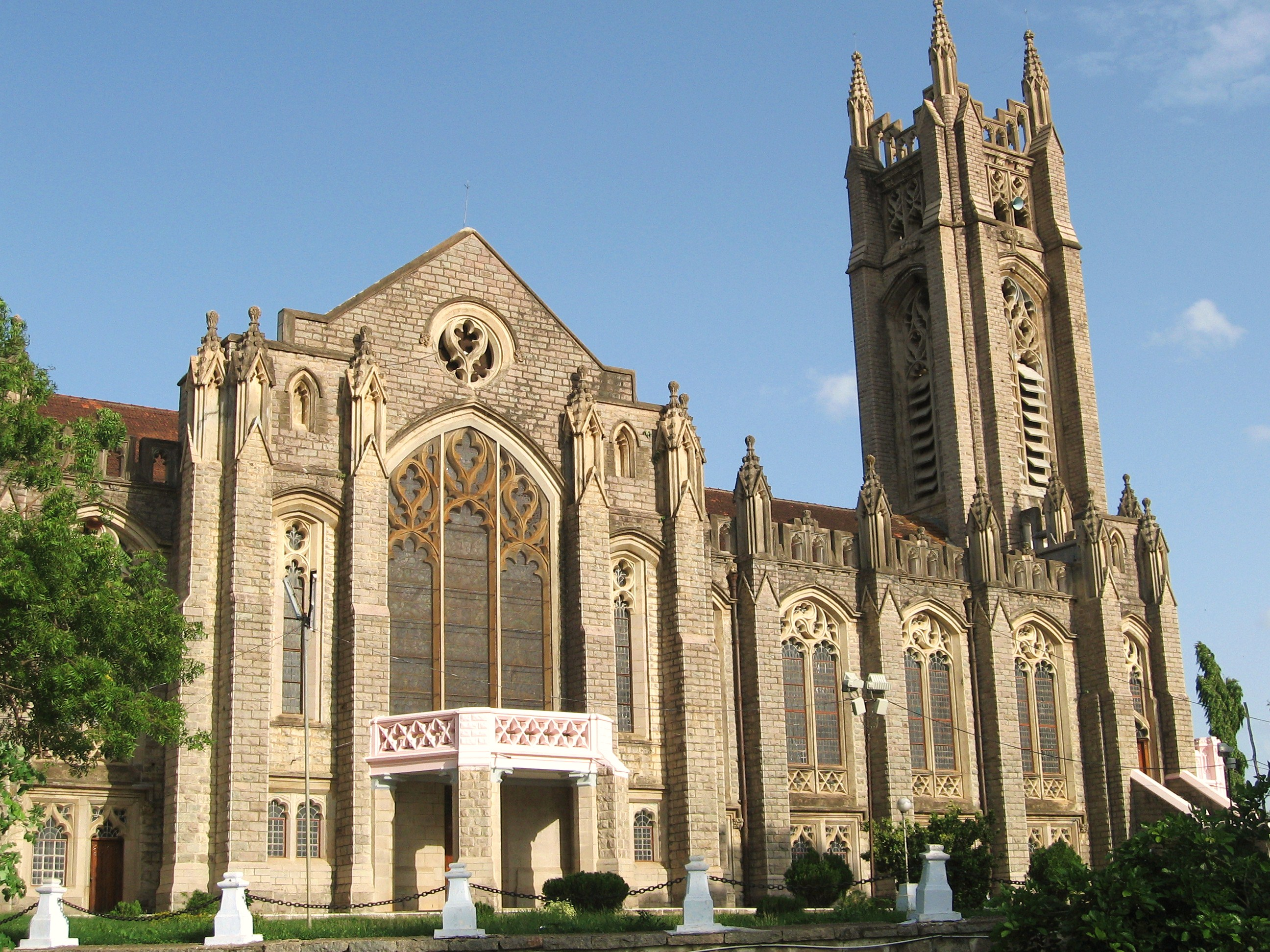
The CSI-Medak Cathedral in Medak - it was here that Sugandhar was ordained in 1969 by Bishop H. D. L. Abraham.

B. P. Sugandhar (28 September 1943 – 5 December 2017) was the fifth successor of Frank Whittaker as Bishop - in - Medak of the Church of South India whose bishopric lasted for more than a decade and half from 1993 through 2009 coinciding with the archbishoprics of Samineni Arulappa and Marampudi Joji of the Archdiocese of Hyderabad.

It was in 1992 that the Old Testament Scholar, Bishop P. Victor Premasagar vacated the Cathedra on attaining superannuation, following which Sugandhar contested the vacant bishopric and was appointed and consecrated in September 1993 by the Church of South India Synod led by its Moderator Vasanth P. Dandin, and its Deputy Moderator Jason S. Dharmaraj, making Sugandhar assume the Cathedra in CSI-Medak Cathedral in Medak.

Sugandhar led the Diocese of Medak through its evangelical ministry which later extended far beyond the ecclesiastical jurisdiction of the Diocese of Medak when he was elected to the Church of South India Synod for four consecutive bienniums, as Deputy Moderator in 2000 and as Moderator in 2004 and was at the helm of leadership of the CSI Synod in the 2000s and crisscrossed throughout southern India that included not only the states of Andhra Pradesh, Karnataka, Kerala, Tamil Nadu, and Telangana, but also the Union territory of Puducherry and the neighbouring nation of Sri Lanka.

After serving the ministries of the Church as an ecclesiastical co-worker spanning four decades (1969–2009), Sugandhar died on Tuesday, 5 December 2017 in his quarters in West Marredpally, Secunderabad. Sugandhar was one of the surviving bishops emeriti of the diocese, and his death is being mourned by the Diocese of Medak led by A. C. Solomon Raj, Bishop - in - Medak and other diocesan administrators. On Wednesday, 6.12.2017, the Diocese of Medak had made all efforts and kept his mortal remains at the CSI-Diocesan Office, Behind South Central Railway Hyderabad railway division, Secunderabad from 9:00 A.M. through 15:00 hours Indian Standard Time which, enabled the faithful to pay their respects following which the Funeral mass was conducted at 15:00 hours at the CSI-Church of St. John the Baptist, Sardar Patel Road, Secunderabad in the presence of Bishop Emeritus P. Surya Prakash and thereafter a Christian burial mass at 16:00 hours was held at the Cemetery of CSI-Church of St. John the Baptist located in Parade Grounds in Secunderabad Cantonment.

== Contribution ==
=== Ecumenism and the unity of the Churches ===
Sugandhar strove for ecumenism and led the Andhra Pradesh and Telangana Federation of Churches, a society that incorporates bishops of the Roman Catholic, Oriental Orthodox, Protestant, and Indigenous Church traditions. Along with then Archbishop of Hyderabad, M. Joji, and then secretary of the Andhra Pradesh Council of Churches, J. A. Oliver, Sugandhar actively took part in ecumenical conversations to build up the unity of the Churches. In 2000, Sugandhar was one of the Anglican Participants at the Pontifical Council for Promoting Christian Unity. which was held during the papacy of Pope John Paul II.

=== Towards spiritual formation ===
As an administrator of the Diocese of Medak from 1993 through 2009, Sugandhar donned the mantle of a Vocation Promoter and led many youth to full-time ministry making them undergo studies in divinity at the Spiritual formation centres in Secunderabad and at Bangalore at the Andhra Christian Theological College and the United Theological College, both of which were notable for their Old Testament scholarship with the presence of G. Babu Rao, CBCNC in Secunderabad and Gnana Robinson, CSI in Bangalore. Incidentally, Sugandhar's senior graduate companion R. Yesurathnam, CSI who had been notable as a Systematic Theologian became Principal of the Protestant Seminary in Secunderabad in 1994 coinciding with the bishopric of Sugandhar.

Sugandhar also participated in the governance of these two seminaries as a member of the respective Seminary societies on the board of governors of Andhra Christian Theological College and on the Council of the United Theological College. The Old Testament Scholar, Ch. Vasantha Rao, who presently heads the United Theological College, Bangalore acknowledges the efforts of Sugandhar in promoting higher theological education during his spiritual formation period leading to M. Th. and Dr. Theol in Bangalore and Hamburg.

=== Propagation of Bible reading ===
Bishop Sugandhar served as the vice-president of the Bible Society of India Andhra Pradesh Auxiliary during the terms of Auxiliary Secretaries, L. Prakasam, CBCNC in the 1990s followed by G. Babu Rao, CBCNC and was involved in promotion and distribution of the Bible throughout Telangana and Andhra Pradesh.

=== Medical missions ===
The Diocese of Medak was represented in the council and association of Christian Medical College, Vellore and many medical aspirants were led to medical missions and after their studies in Vellore they served the dispensaries and hospitals in the diocese and with Sugandhar's encouragement, efforts were also made to start a full-fledged medical college in Dichpalle, but did not fructify.

=== Gender equality in ordination of Pastors ===
It was in 1970 that the Church of South India Synod led by P. Solomon first mooted the ordination of women, resulting in objections from the Laity and a decade of legal recourse followed and efforts were made by the CSI-Synod to overcome them, leading to full-fledged ordination of women in 1982 during the term of I. Jesudason, that led to the ordination of Elizabeth Paul, the first ordained Woman priest in the Church of South India Synod.

In the Diocese of Medak, the first Woman priest to be ordained was B. Samarpana Kumari, a seminarian at the Andhra Christian Theological College who underwent Spiritual formation during the Principalship of M. Victor Paul, AELC and was ordained by the diocese during the bishopric of Victor Premasagar. Following that, when Sugandhar took over the mantle in 1993, Woman priests continued to be ordained and he supported its cause and stood by societies which promoted it, especially the Association of Theologically Trained Women in India in which Sugandhar also delivered a talk on the role of Women priest during one of its regional plenaries held at Jeevan Jyothi Formation Centre in Begumpet during the term of its secretary, Florence Deenadayalan, CSI, Treasurer, Johanna Rose Ratnavathi, AELC and its president, Navamani Elia Peter, MCI.

=== Writings ===
Sugandhar contributed to theological writings, both as a pastor and later as a bishop, among which are,

- 1988, Resources for Mission in Local Congregations, – this essay was contributed to the volume honouring the Old Testament Scholar, Victor Premasagar's ministry for which a commemorative volume (fetschrift) was edited by H. S. Wilson,
- 2001, Ecumenism: Creation's greatest challenge, – Sugandhar wrote an essay honouring the contribution of the Systematic Theologian G. Dyvasirvadam.

=== Juridical precedence ===
In matters of domestic enquiry, a legal case involving the Diocese of Medak is often used as a citation in matters of jurisprudence where the Supreme Court of India through its bench headed by G. T. Nanavati ruled in favour of the Diocese of Medak thereby overruling an earlier High Court of Andhra Pradesh judgement. In 1996, in the case of B. P. Sugandhar, Bishop - in - Medak Versus D. Dorothy Dayasheela Ebenezer, the manner of conduction of domestic enquiry was highly appreciated by then juridical experts and the case law continues to be used as a citation in the courts of law.

== Studies and ministerial formation ==
=== Seminarian: 1964-1968 ===
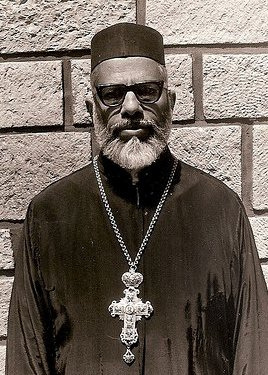
V. C. Samuel, MOSC

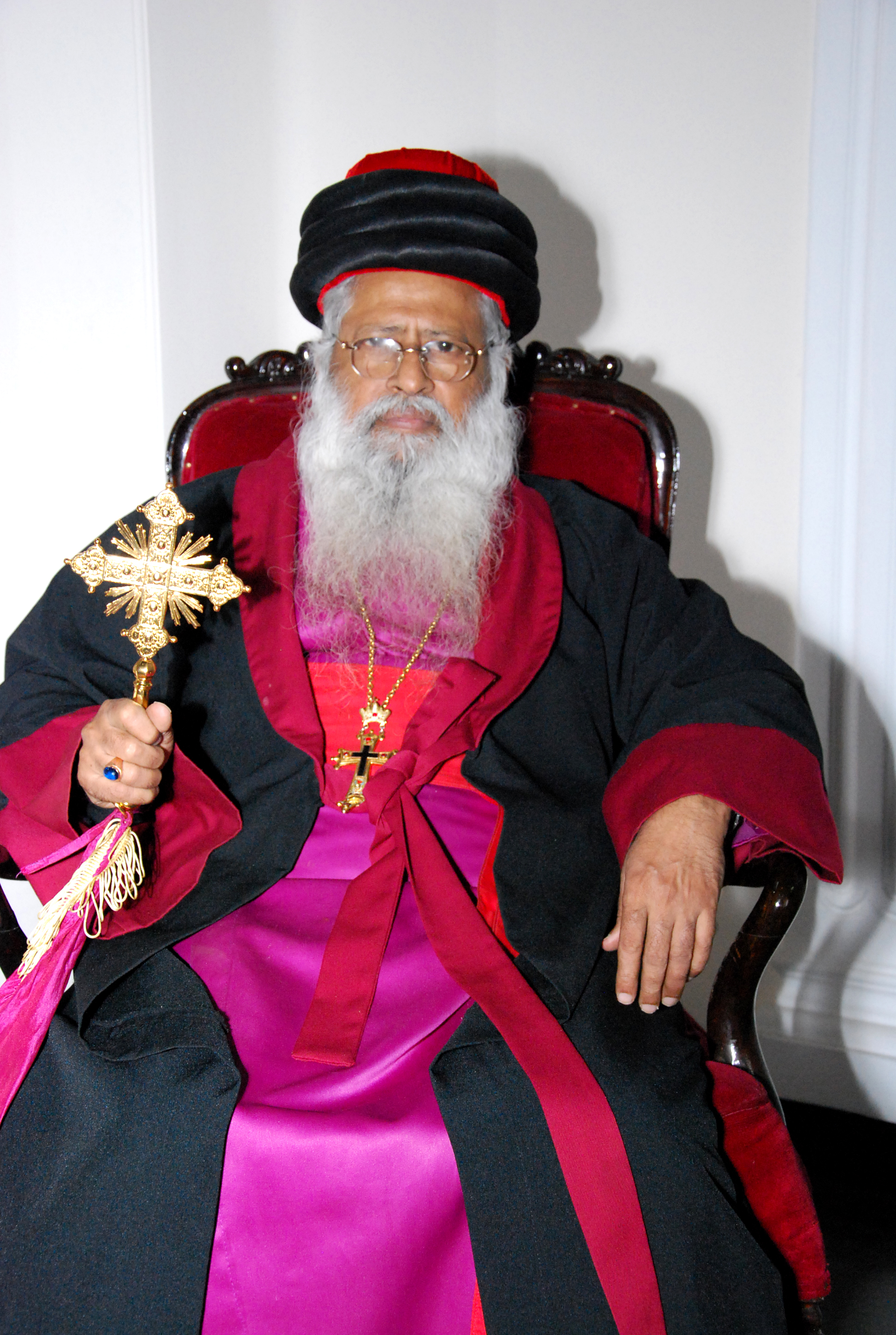
Mar Aprem Mooken, ACE

Father V. C. Samuel, a specialist in Christology, was one of Sugandhar's Spiritual Formators at the UTC, Bangalore;
Metropolitan Mar Aprem Mooken was a postgraduate companion of Sugandhar.

During the bishopric of Eber Priestley as Bishop - in - Medak, Sugandhar was admitted in 1963 as a ministerial candidate of the Diocese of Medak and a year later, was sent for ministerial formation in 1964 to the United Theological College, Bangalore, an affiliated institution of the Senate of Serampore College (University). Sugandhar underwent a four-year spiritual formation at the seminary in Karnataka which was then headed by the Systematic Theologian Joshua Russell Chandran and was taught by notable faculty that comprised the Religions Scholar, S. J. Samartha, the Church Historian V. C. Samuel, the Old Testament Scholars, Samuel Amirtham and E. C. John and others.

Among Sugandhar's senior companions studying during that period were A. P. Nirmal, CNI, R. Yesurathnam, CSI, G. T. Abraham, CSI, S. Wesley Ariarajah, MCSL, Dhyanchand Carr, CSI, Philipose Mar Eusebius, MOSC, among others who contributed much to the Christian ministry in India and elsewhere and other companions comprised R. S. Sugirtharajah, D. James Srinivasan, CSI, S. D. L. Alagodi, CSI, Godwin Shiri, CSI, C. B. M. Frederick, CSI, S. J. Theodore, CSI, Arunkumar Wesley, CSI, H. S. Wilson, CSI, Basil Rebera and others. By this time, the postgraduate course of the college had an increasing uptake with a number of enrollments growing up which saw thoroughbred Scholars joining the course leading to Master of Theology in which, Kallarakkal Abraham George, MOSC and Mar Aprem Mooken, ACE, enrolled and specialized in Old Testament and Church History respectively.

It was during his seminary studies at the UTC, Bangalore that Sugandhar came across co-students from other Church backgrounds that included not only the Protestant, Orthodox and Indigenous traditions, but also the Catholic (Latin rite) when the Franciscan Friar J. A. G. Gerwin van Leeuwen, OFM also began studying at the UTC, Bangalore during 1966–1968, which later enabled Sugandhar to relate to other Churches within Christianity and also participate in a Pontifical council in 2000.

=== University convocation: 1969 ===
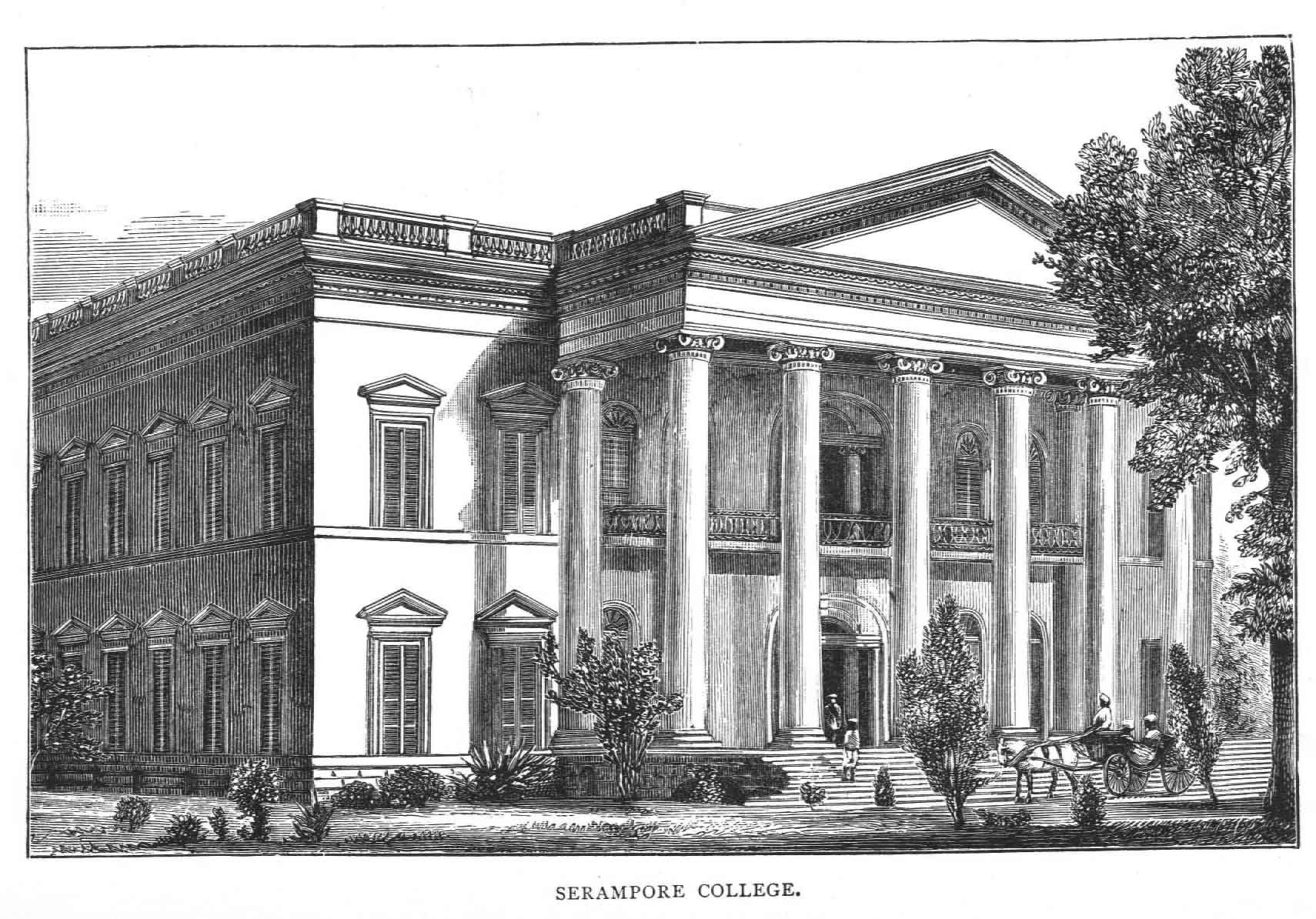
The Senate of Serampore College (University), Serampore, India, which awarded the degree of Bachelor of Divinity to Sugandhar in 1969.

As an aspirant of the Diocese of Medak, Sugandhar underwent Spiritual formation at the United Theological College, Bangalore, affiliated to India's first University, the Senate of Serampore College (University) {a University under Section 2 (f) of the University Grants Commission Act, 1956}with degree-granting authority validated by a Danish Charter and ratified by the Government of West Bengal. In 1968, Sugandhar completed his ministerial formation period and subsequently in the year 1969, the Senate of Serampore College (University), then led by Registrar C. Devasahayam, CBCNC, awarded the degree of Bachelor of Divinity during its annual convocation. By this time D. S. Satyaranjan, IPC was already part of the Senate of Serampore College (University) as administrative officer.

== Ecclesiastical ministry ==
=== Ordination: 1969 ===
In 1969, during the bishopric of H. D. L. Abraham, Sugandhar was ordained as a pastor of the Diocese of Medak at the Medak Cathedral in Medak.

=== Pastorship: 1969-2009 ===
Sugandhar began serving the Christian ministry at Ramayampet, Yellareddy, Utnoor, Bellampally, and Medak. He was also presbyter-in-charge at the Church of St. John the Baptist, Secunderabad before being consecrated as the Bishop in Medak. Although a Resident Presbyter has been appointed in that Church, Sugandhar continued to be the Presbyter-in-charge of the Church of St. John the Baptist till the end of his bishopric.

=== Bishopric: 1993-2009 ===
The Old Testament Scholar, Victor Premasagar's bishopric came to an end in 1992 following which the Synod of the CSI conducted elections and declared Sugandhar as his successor and was consecrated by Vasanth P. Dandin, then moderator of the CSI in the cathedral in Medak in September 1993.

== CSI Synod: 2000-2008 ==
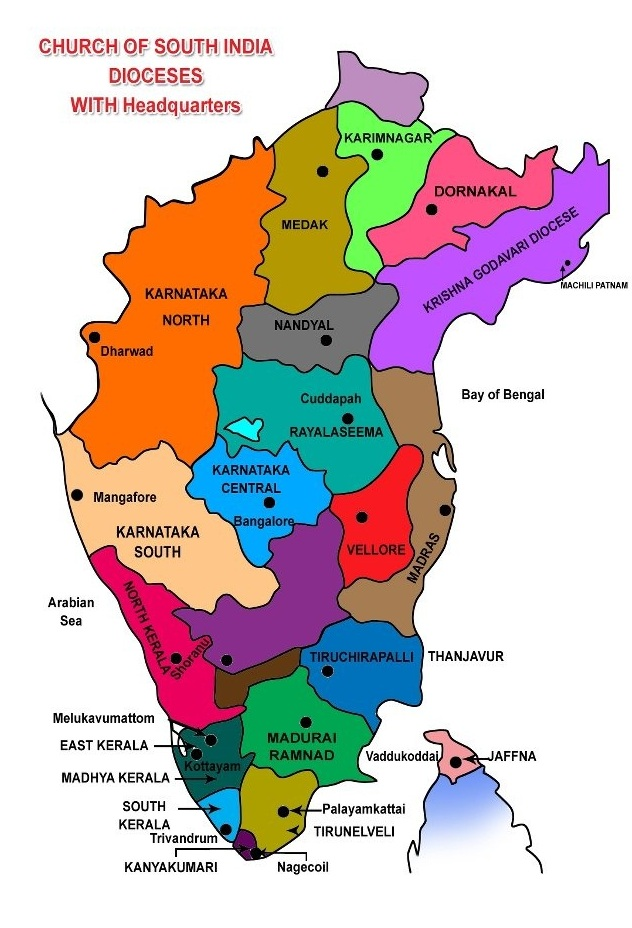
Ecclesiastical jurisdiction of the Church of South India Synod - Sugandhar led the Synod for nearly a decade from 2000 to 2008.

Sugandhar first began attending the Synods of the Church of South India when he went along with his Bishop Victor Premasagar and represented the Medak Diocesan Council at the Synods. However, after assuming the bishopric, Sugandhar began participating with full leadership beginning with the Trichy Synod held in 1994 and from that point of time onwards, he had attended two sessions in 1996 in Coimbatore and in 1998 in Madanapalle but first contested the Synod only in 2000.

=== XXVII session: 2000, Secunderabad ===
During 12–16 January 2000, the CSI Synod was held in Secunderabad hosted by the Diocese of Medak which saw the election of Sugandhar as Deputy Moderator in place of K. J. Samuel who was elected as the Moderator.

=== XXVIII session: 2002, Melukavu ===
The XXVIII session of the CSI Synod was hosted in 2002 by the Diocese of East Kerala in Melukavu in Kerala, where again Sugandhar and K. J. Samuel were re-elected as the Deputy Moderator and Moderator.

=== XXIX session: 2004, Bangalore ===
During the XXIX Synod of the CSI held in Bangalore from 10 to 14 January 2004 hosted by the Karnataka Central Diocese, Sugandhar was elected as Moderator of the CSI replacing his predecessor K. J. Samuel and S. Vasantha Kumar was elected as the Deputy Moderator in place of Sugandhar.

=== XXX session: 2006, Mysore ===
In the XXX Synod held in Mysore in 2006, hosted by the Karnataka Southern Diocese, he was re-elected as the Moderator while his deputy, S. Vasantha Kumar retained his place.

In the 31st Synod held in Visakhapatnam in January 2008, fresh elections paved way for a new Moderator Bishop J. W. Gladstone to be elected in place of Bishop Sugandhar.

== Other initiatives ==
Sugandhar represented the CSI as a delegate for the EMS Mission Council in 2002 and was also elected as president, CSI Council of North America in 2005.

=== Lambeth Conferences: 1998 and 2008 ===
As a member of the Church of South India, Sugandhar as bishop-in-Medak, participated in the decennial Lambeth Conferences held in England in 1998 and 2008, presided by then Archbishop of Canterbury, George Carey and Rowan Williams respectively.

== Honours ==
The Throne of Grace Theological Seminary and Ministries Inc. (International), Hyderabad conferred the degree of D.Min. on the Bishop. The degrees issued by this unaccredited seminary are only nominal.

Honorary titles
Preceded by P. Victor Premasagar	Member, Board of Governors, Andhra Christian Theological College, Secunderabad; 1993-2009	Succeeded by T. S. Kanaka Prasad
Preceded by Vasanth P. Dandin	Chairperson, United Theological College, Bangalore; 2000-2003	Succeeded by G. Dyvasirvadam
Religious titles
Preceded by P. Victor Premasagar	Bishop - in - Medak, Medak; September 1993 – September 2009	Succeeded by T. S. Kanaka Prasad
Preceded by K. J. Samuel	Deputy Moderator, Church of South India Synod, Chennai; January 2000 – January 2004	Succeeded by S. Vasantha Kumar
Preceded by K. J. Samuel	Moderator, Church of South India Synod, Chennai; January 2004 – January 2008	Succeeded by J. W. Gladstone
