= Hospet Sumitra =

Bishop Hospet Sumitra, CSI Ayyagaru
- Bishop - in - Rayalaseema
- Church: Church of South India (A Uniting church comprising Wesleyan Methodist, Congregational, Presbyterian and Anglican missionary societies – ABCFM, SPG, WMMS, LMS, Basel Mission, CMS, and the Church of England)
- Diocese: Rayalaseema
- In office: 1947–1963
- Predecessor: Position created
- Successor: L. V. Azariah

Orders
- Consecration: 27 September 1947 by Bishop Cherakarottu Korula Jacob
- Rank: Bishop

Personal details
- Born: 13 November 1888
- Died: 19 January 1970 (aged 81) Bellary, Karnataka
- Denomination: Christianity
- Profession: Pastor, Ecclesiastical Administrator
- Education: Pre-University studies, B.D. (Serampore)
- Alma mater: Central College of Bangalore; United Theological College, Bengaluru

Hospet Sumitra was the first Bishop in Rayalaseema of the Church of South India.

After graduating from the Central College of Bangalore, he studied theology at the United Theological College, Bengaluru between 1910 and 1913 and was among its first students and studied under L. P. Larsen, J. Mathers, F. Kingsbury, G. E. Phillips, W. H. Thorp, D. S. Herrick, and others.

He became a bishop on 29 September 1947 and oversaw the diocese of Cuddapah; Cuddapah was merged with Anantapur-Kurnool in 1950 and Sumitra became the first bishop of the newly created Diocese of Rayalaseema.

He was Moderator of the Church of South India from 1954 to 1962.

Sumitra died on 19 January 1970 in Bellary, Karnataka.

Religious titles
Preceded by Position Created	Bishop in Cuddapah; Church of South India; 1947–1950	Succeeded by Position Ended
Preceded by Position Created; Bunyan Joseph; Bishop of Anantapur-Kurnool Diocese; Two Dioceses integrated into new Rayalaseema Diocese	Bishop in Rayalaseema; Church of South India; 1950–1963	Succeeded by L. V. Azariah
Preceded by Frank Whittaker	Deputy Moderator; Church of South India; 1952–1954	Succeeded by Lesslie Newbigin
Preceded by Arthur Michael Hollis	Moderator; Church of South India; 1954–1962	Succeeded by Arnold Legg
