= Kunnumpurathu Samuel =

Indian religious leader

Kunnumpurathu Samuel was an Indian religious leader.

He was the Bishop of East Kerala; and Moderator of the Church of South India from 2000 to 2004.

== Notes ==
Religious titles
Preceded by William Moses	Moderator, Church of South India Synod; 2000-2004	Succeeded by Peter Sugandhar
