= William Moses (bishop) =

Passed away on 20.07.2024

William Moses was the fourth Bishop of Church of South India, Coimbatore Diocese (1987–2000) and the Moderator (1998–2000) of the Church of South India.

== Early life ==
Moses was born on 29 July 1937 to William Kari and Janaki William Kari as the first son among 10 siblings. Died on 20 July 2024.

== Notes ==
Religious titles
Preceded by Vasant P. Dandin	Moderator, Church of South India Synod; 1998 - 2000	Succeeded by Kunnumpurathu Samuel
