= Isaiah Jesudason =

Indian bishop (1925–2013)

- Bishop – in – South Kerala Diocese (1972-1990)
- Church: Christian
- Diocese: South Kerala Diocese
- See: Church of South India
- In office: 1972-1990
- Predecessor: W. P. Vachalan
- Successor: Samuel Amirtham
- Previous posts: Principal, Kerala United Theological Seminary, Trivandrum (-1972)

Orders
- Ordination: 1955 by Arnold Legg
- Consecration: 5 August 1973 by Ananda Rao Samuel, Moderator; Co-consecrator, Lesslie Newbigin, Deputy Moderator

Personal details
- Born: 14 February 1925 Kariyil Thottam, Amaravila, Kerala
- Died: 16 June 2013 (aged 88) Pattom, Kerala

Bishop I. Jesudasan (1925-2013) was the third Bishop-in-South Kerala Diocese of the Church of South India.

== Studies ==
Jesudasan studied at seminaries affiliated to India's first University, the Senate of Serampore College (University) {a University under Section 2 (f) of the University Grants Commission Act, 1956} with degree-granting authority validated by a Danish Charter and ratified by the Government of West Bengal.

He first studied at the Kerala United Theological Seminary, Trivandrum where he took a Licentiate in Theology and then at the Serampore College, Serampore between 1951-1953 where he took a Bachelor of Divinity and then the Leonard Theological College, Jabalpur where he studied for a Master of Theology. In addition he also studied at the Union Theological Seminary (New York City) for a Master of Sacred Theology degree.

== Career ==
While Jesudasan was teaching at the Kerala United Theological Seminary, Trivandrum, he was elected as the third Bishop - in - South Kerala Diocese and consecrated on 5 August 1973 by Moderator, N. D. Ananda Rao Samuel and Lesslie Newbigin, the Deputy Moderator.

During the seventeenth Church of South India Synod held from 10–14 January 1980 at the Madras Christian College, Tambaram, Jesudasan was elected as the Deputy Moderator and held the office from 1980 to 1982. Again during the eighteenth Church of South India Synod held from 11–15 January 1982 at Vellore, Jesudasan became the Moderator and held the office three consecutive terms up to 1988.

Jesudasan retired from the bishopric on 14 February 1990 on attaining superannuation. The Senate of Serampore College (University) awarded an honorary doctorate degree upon Jesudasan in 1989.

On 16 June 2013, Jesudasan died due to ill health.

Awards and achievements
| Preceded by Hokishe Sema; Zairema; Samuel Amirtham; 1988 | Senate of Serampore College (University); Doctor of Divinity Honoris Causa; 1989 | Succeeded by Mother Teresa; M. A. Thomas; Earnest Stafford; 1991 |
Religious titles
| Preceded by W. P. Vachalan; 1966-1972 | Bishop - in - South Kerala Diocese; Church of South India; 1972-1990 | Succeeded by Samuel Amirtham; 1990-1997 |
| Preceded by Solomon Doraiswamy; 1978-1980 | Deputy Moderator; Church of South India Synod; 1980-1982 | Succeeded by Sundar Clarke; 1982-1986 |
| Preceded by Solomon Doraiswamy; 1980-1982 | Moderator; Church of South India Synod; 1982-1988 | Succeeded by Victor Premasagar; 1988-1992 |
