= Pushpa Lalitha =

Indian bishop (born 1956)

The Right Reverend Sister E. Pushpa Lalitha CSI Order of Sisters
- Bishop – in – Nandyal
- Church: Church of South India (A Uniting church comprising Wesleyan Methodist, Congregational, Calvinist and Anglican missionary societies – SPG, WMMS, LMS, Basel Mission, CMS, and the Church of England)
- Diocese: Nandyal Diocese
- Elected: 2013
- In office: 2013–present
- Predecessor: P. J. Lawrence
- Successor: Incumbent

Orders
- Ordination: As Deaconess on 17 July 1983, As Presbyter on 8 April 1984 by Bishop L. V. Azaraiah, CSI
- Consecration: 29 September 2013 by G. Devakadasham, Moderator (Principal Consecrator), and Govada Dyvasirvadam, Deputy Moderator (Co-consecrator)
- Rank: Bishop

Personal details
- Born: Eggoni Pushpa Lalitha; 22 November 1956 (age 69) Diguvapadu, Kurnool district
- Denomination: Christianity
- Residence: Nandyal
- Occupation: Priesthood
- Education: B. A., B. D. (Serampore)
- Alma mater: Andhra Christian Theological College, Secunderabad (Telangana), Selly Oak Colleges, Birmingham (United Kingdom), United Theological College of the West Indies, Kingston (Jamaica), Pacific Lutheran Theological Seminary, Berkeley (United States)

Eggoni Pushpa Lalitha (born 1956) is the Bishop of the Nandyal Diocese of the Church of South India. She is the first woman to become a bishop in Church of South India.

The Church of South India, part of the Anglican Communion, created history when then Moderator, G. Devakadasham and Deputy Moderator G. Dyvasirvadam consecrated Pushpa Lalitha in 2013 making a woman Reverend become a bishop. Pushpa Lalitha is a member of the CSI Order of Sisters headquartered in Bangalore and although she is the first woman to be consecrated as Bishop of Church of South India, the first woman to be consecrated Bishop in any church in Asia was A. Katakshamma of the Good Samaritan Evangelical Lutheran Church, Bhadrachalam. The first ordained woman priest in India is Sr. Elizabeth Paul, also of the CSI Order of Sisters.

== Early years ==
Eggoni Pushpa Lalitha was born to a family of agriculturists in Diguvapadu village in Kurnool district of Andhra Pradesh. She acknowledges the influence of the Protestant and Catholic Missionaries who lead a selfless life and she very much wanted to lead such a life and became a member of the CSI Order of Sisters.

=== Ministerial Formation ===
Pushpa Lalitha had her ministerial formation at the Andhra Christian Theological College, Secunderabad affiliated to the nation's first University, the Senate of Serampore College (University) where she studied from 1979-1982 during the period of the Old Testament Scholars, Victor Premasagar, CSI and G. Babu Rao, CBCNC.

She later had an exposure in 1984–1985 at the Selly Oak Colleges, Birmingham and at the United Church of Jamaica and Cayman Islands, Kingston, Jamaica. Pushpa Lalitha also studied advanced courses at Berkeley, California during 1993–1995 at the Pacific Lutheran Theological Seminary.

== Ordination and pastorship ==
Eggoni Pushpa Lalitha was ordained, as Deaconess in 1983 and as a priest on 1984. She held the post of Director of Vishranthi Nilayam, the headquarters of the CSI Order of Sisters on Infantry road in Bangalore and the administrative head of the Church of South India women fellowship. She has also served as Chairperson of the Deanery committee.

== Bishopric ==
Eggoni Pushpa Lalitha was appointed the Bishop of Nandyal Diocese on 25 September 2013. She was consecrated as Bishop on 29 September 2013 at the CSI-Holy Cross Cathedral in Nandyal by Moderator G. Devakadasham and Deputy Moderator G. Dyvasirvadam.

Religious titles
Preceded by P. J. Lawrence; 2006–2012	Bishop – in – Nandyal, Nandyal; 29 September 2013-	Succeeded by Incumbent
Honorary titles
Preceded by Geevarghese Mar Yulios, MOSC; 2015–2019	Vice-Chairperson, Henry Martyn Institute, Hyderabad; 2019-present	Succeeded by Incumbent
