= K. B. Yesu Vara Prasad =

- Bishop – in – Rayalaseema
- Church: Christian
- Diocese: Rayalaseema
- See: Church of South India
- In office: 2006-2012
- Predecessor: C. B. M. Frederick
- Successor: B. D. Prasad Rao
- Previous posts: Pastor, Diocese of Rayalaseema, Church of South India

Orders
- Consecration: 2006 by The Most Reverend B. P. Sugandhar, Moderator,

Personal details
- Born: Andhra Pradesh

The Right Reverend K. B. Yesu Prasad is Bishop Emeritus in Rayalaseema Diocese of the Church of South India who served as bishop from 2006 through 2012.

Prasada Rao had his ministerial formation at the Andhra Christian Theological College, Hyderabad, affiliated to the nation's first University, the Senate of Serampore College (University), where he studied Bachelor of Divinity.

In 2006, the Most Reverend B. P. Sugandhar, then Moderator principally consecrated Vara Prasad at the Cathedral in Kadapa.

Religious titles
Preceded by C. B. M. Frederick; 1996-2004	Bishop - in - Rayalaseema; Church of South India; 2006-2012	Succeeded by B. D. Prasad Rao; 2013-
