= Diocese of Nandyal =

Diocese of the Church of South India in Andhra Pradesh, India

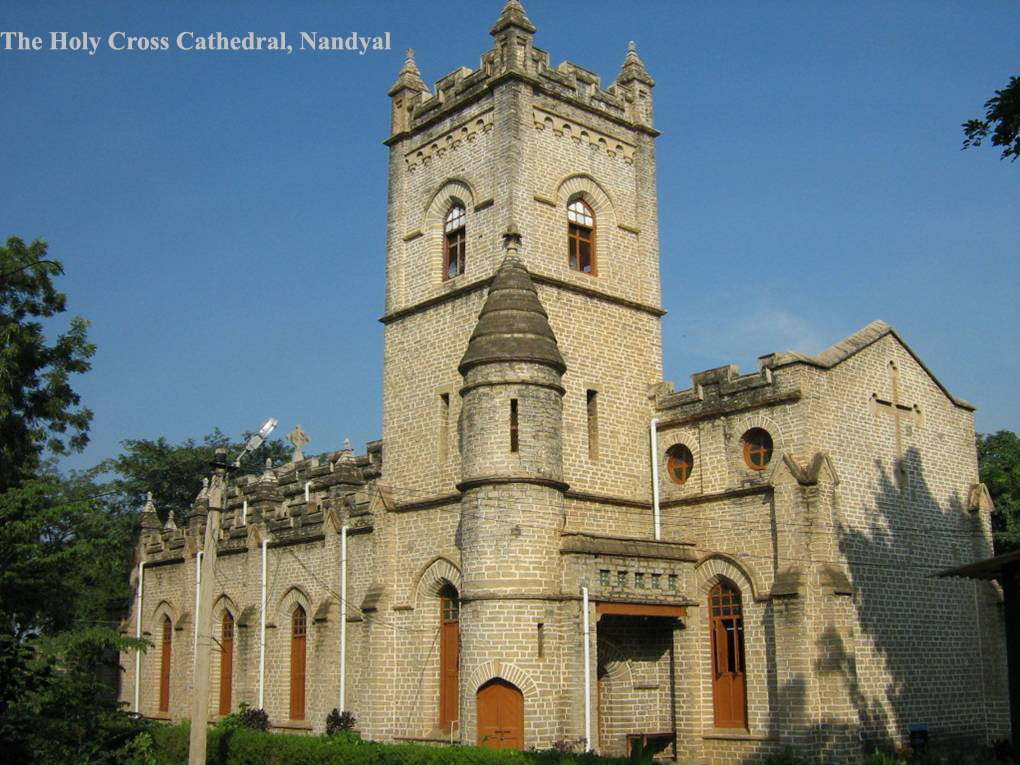
- The Holy Cross cathedral, Nandyal.

Location
- Ecclesiastical province: Church of South India

Information
- Cathedral: CSI Holy Cross Cathedral, Nandyal

Current leadership
- Bishop: Kamanuri Santhosh Prasanna Rao

Nandyal Diocese is a diocese of Church of South India in Andhra Pradesh state of India. The diocese is one among the 22 dioceses of Church of South India, a United Protestant denomination.

== History ==
The first missionaries who came to Nandyal were Arthur Inman and Alfred Briton in the year 1881. These two missionaries were responsible to establish the SPG High School in 1884 and to build the Holy Cross Church in 1905 in Nandyal. These two missionaries who resided in Nandyal lived in tents and went about preaching the gospel in and around Nandyal in various villages and building churches. Their mode of travel in those days were bullock carts on most primitive roads or cart tracks. They learned the local language Telugu and traveled extensively beyond Nandyal to place like Kurnool, Giddalur, Kalasapad, Atmakur and Nandikotkur and planted churches in the villages. In this church first SPG Telugu Graduate Priest Rev. David Gnanamuthu served from 1912 to 1923, he came from Medras Christian Theological College, Madras (1880 to 1885)and he worked in Jammalamadugu area, Koilakuntla, Muhyalapadu, Kurnool and also his son Rev.John Yesudas Gnanamuthu served in this diocese as Deanery Chairman and Archdeacon.

When Dornakal diocese (of which it was then a part) joined the united Church of South India in 1947, Nandyal instead chose to remain in the Indian Anglican Church, under the Diocese of Calcutta. Nandyal diocese was formed on 29 April 1963, initially as part of the Church of India (CIPBC); with that church, it united into the Church of North India in 1970, and the Nandyal diocese eventually joined the Church of South India on 6 July 1975.

The cathedral church of the diocese is CSI Holy Cross Cathedral in Nandyal.

== Bishops ==
In 1950, Arthur Partridge was consecrated Bishop in Nandyal, an assistant bishop in the Diocese of Calcutta; he served until Nandyal diocese was erected and returned to the UK.

- 1963–1967, Clement Venkataramiah
- 1967–1974, Ernest John
- 1977–1985, Pabbathi John
- 1985–1992, Ryder Devapriam
- 1994–2005, Rt.Rev. Dr. Gondi Theodore Abraham
- 2006–2012, P. J. Lawrence
- 2013 onwards, E. Pushpa Lalitha
- 2025 onwards, Kamanuri Santhosh Prasanna Rao

== Notable ecclesiastical personalities ==
- Bunyan Joseph, Bishop of erstwhile Anantapur-Kurnool Diocese (integrated into Rayalaseema Diocese),
- B. E. Devaraj, translator of the Bible into Lambadi language,
- Pabbathi John, First Bishop of Nandyal Diocese Nandyal Diocese,
- Emani Sambayya, non-episcopal commissary to Nandyal,

== Educational institutions in the diocese ==
* Aided Schools.

- The SPG High School (Aided), Nandyal, was established in the year 1882.
- The Holy Cross Girls High School (Aided), Nandyal.
- Nandikotkur
- Badvel.
- Muthyalapadu.
