= CSI Order of Sisters =

The CSI Order of Sisters
- Type: Protestant religious order
- Headquarters: Bangalore
- Secretary, CSI Order of Sisters: Sr. Annamma Mathew
- Key people: Elizabeth Paul, Eggoni Pushpa Lalitha
- Staff: 55

The Church of South India Order of Sisters is a Protestant religious congregation founded in India. At every biennial Church of South India Synod, two sisters from the congregation are entitled to participate in the Synod.
