= C. B. M. Frederick =

- Bishop in Rayalaseema
- Church: Church of South India
- Diocese: Rayalaseema
- In office: 1976–1996
- Predecessor: -

Orders
- Consecration: 1996

Chevitipalle Bellum Moses Frederick was the third Bishop in Rayalaseema of the Church of South India.

Religious titles
Preceded by L. V. Azariah	Bishop in Rayalaseema; Church of South India; 1996–2004	Succeeded by K. B. Yesu Vara Prasad
