= L. V. Azariah =

- Bishop in Rayalaseema
- Church: Church of South India
- Diocese: Rayalaseema
- In office: 1976–1996
- Predecessor: -

Orders
- Consecration: 1976

L. V. Azariah B.D. (Serampore), Th. M. (WTS) was the second Bishop in Rayalaseema of the Church of South India.

Religious titles
Preceded by Hospet Sumitra	Bishop in Rayalaseema; Church of South India; 1976–1996	Succeeded by C. B. M. Frederick
