= Paul David Devanandan =

Indian Protestant theologian

P. D. Devanandan
- Born: Paul David Devanandan; July 8, 1901; Madras, British India
- Died: August 10, 1962 (aged 61); Deharadun, Uttar Pradesh
- Occupations: Protestant, theologian

Paul David Devanandan (1901–1962), spelt also as P.D. Devanandan or Paul D. Devanandan, was an Indian Protestant theologian, ecumenist, and one of the notable pioneers in inter-religious dialogues in India.

== Biography ==
He was born in Madras (present Chennai) on 9 July 1901, and graduated from Nizam College, Hyderabad. He did his M.A from Presidency College, Madras. While studying at Madras, he was acquainted with K. T. Paul, a prominent Social activist, Christian and YMCA leader. He taught briefly at Jaffna College, Ceylon, Sri Lanka. With assistance from K.T. Paul, he flew United States in 1924 and studied theology at Pacific School of Religion, Berkeley, California. He received his doctorate in Comparative religion from Yale University in 1931 - for his dissertation on the concept of Maya in Hinduism.

Upon his return to India in 1931, he was absorbed as a professor of philosophy and religions at United Theological College, Bangalore for seventeen years between 1932 and 1949. He had a lasting and long association with Young Men's Christian Association (YMCA); he worked as a secretary at the Delhi YMCA, and later as national literature secretary at YMCA between 1949 and 1956.

In 1954, he was ordained as a presbyter of the Church of South India. In 1956, he was appointed as the director of the new "Center for the study of Hinduism" - later renamed to "Christian Institute for the Study of Religion and Society"(CISRS), Bangalore. He was the first person appointed to the post.

His address to the Third Assembly of the World Council of Churches at New Delhi in 1961, under the title "Called to Witness," was delivered a few months before his death and caught the attention of the large ecumenical church. He died on 10 August 1962 at Dehra Dun, India, on his way to a conference at the Christian Retreat and Study Centre.

== Bibliography ==
While working at CISRS, he along with M. M. Thomas, an associate and then-Chairman of the Central Committee of the World Council of Churches, edited Religion and Society, a journal, which was published by CISRS to initiate and provoke a dialogue between Christians and people of other faiths - this journal contributed by him has been described as a preparatory steps for a dialogue, as the conversations among people of different faiths were mostly controversies or monologues, during that time. Devanandan is credited for initiating a series of dialogues with Hindu thinkers and scholars, whereby laying a foundation for a deeper understanding of religions based on the actual experience of dialogue - he was also instrumental in laying the foundation for CISRS and World Council of Churches dialogues with people of other faiths.

He frequently lectured on theological topics, edited articles, participated and conducted seminars and conferences; he focused on the attention of Indian Christians involvement in nation-building (a favourite term), dialogues on Concept of Truth between Christians and Hindus - including, commonality on which Hinduism and Christianity might agree. He spent most of his lifetime working for YMCA and fighting for the missionary establishment; his views on how the Indian Christian community could fit into the national ethos became predominant in the post-missionary era. He initiated dialogues with leaders of other religious communities, based in a faith that Christ didn't limit his work to the church alone. He drew attention to "the surging new life manifest in other religions," and asserted that:

It would be difficult for the Christian to deny that these deep, inner stirrings of the human spirit are in response to the creative activity of the Holy Spirit.

He authored a number of books, notably, The Concept of Maya in 1950 and The Gospel and Renascent Hinduism in 1959; however, his name usually appears as an editor along with M.M. Thomas for most of the books he published, and the articles he contributed like The Changing Patterns of Family in India, Christian Participation in Nation-Building, Communism and Social Revolution in India, Community Development in India's Industrial Urban Areas, Cultural Foundations of Indian Democracy, Human Person, Society and State, India's Quest for Democracy, Problems of Indian Democracy, and alike.

According to Stanley Jedidiah Samartha, an Indian theologian; student of P.D. Devanandan; and editor of I Will Lift Up Mine Eyes Unto the Hills: Sermons and Bible Studies of P. D. Devanandan

Devanandan impressed me not only by his scholarly knowledge of Hinduism but also his attitude towards it. He was indeed critical of many aspects of Hinduism, as is evident in his book The Concept of Maya (1950). But instead of taking a negative attitude towards other religions, including Hinduism, he encouraged a positive attitude, even respect for the beliefs of others. At a time when almost every book on religions in the library, no matter how scholarly, ended with a chapter on "the uniqueness of Christianity", this attitude struck me, especially since I had been brought up to take a wholly negative view of other religions. That one could be a committed Christian and yet take a positive attitude towards other religions came to me as a surprising alternative. Devanandan contributed decisively to this change of attitude.

=== Works ===
His publications include the following;

- The Concept of Maya, 1950.
- The Christian Attitude and Approach to Non-Christian Religions, 1952.
- Communism and the social revolution in India: a Christian interpretation, 1953.
- India's quest for democracy, 1955.
- Cultural foundations of Indian democracy, 1955.
- Foreign Aid and the Social and Cultural Life of India, 1957.
- Human person, society, and state, 1957.
- Religion and National Unity in India, 1958.
- Resurgent Hinduism: review of modern movements, 1959.
- The Gospel and Renascent Hinduism, 1959.
- Living Hinduism: a descriptive survey, 1959.
- The Dravida Kazhagam: A revolt against Brahminism, 1959.
- The Changing Pattern of Family in India, 1960.
- Christian Concern in Hinduism, 1961.
- Christian Issues in Southern Asia, 1963.
- I will lift up mine eyes unto the hills: sermons and Bible studies, 1963
