= Puvvada John =

Puvvada John was Bishop of Nandyal from 9 October 1977 to 24 August 1985.

John was ordained deacon in 1918 and priest in 1920. He worked within the Diocese of Dornakal and was Archdeacon of Nandyal from 1963 until his elevation to the Episcopate.
