= John Gladstone (bishop) =

Indian bishop (born 1945)

John Wilson Gladstone
- Bishop in South Kerala
- Church: Christian
- See: Church of South India
- In office: 1997–2010
- Predecessor: Rev. Dr. Samuel Amirtham
- Successor: Rev. A. Dharmaraj Rasalam
- Previous posts: Professor of Church History, Kerala United Theological Seminary, Thiruvananthapuram

Orders
- Ordination: 20 July 1975
- Consecration: 16 September 1997

Personal details
- Born: 25 December 1945 (age 80) Neyyattinkara, Travancore

John Wilson Gladstone (born 25 December 1945) was the Moderator of the Church of South India as well as Bishop of South Kerala.

== Early years ==
Rev. Dr. Gladstone was born on 25 December 1945 in Travancore. into a pastoral family. His father, Rev. J. Wilson, was a Pastor of the CSI

He had an inclination towards priesthood and after his schooling pursued bachelor's and master's degrees in economics in Thiruvananthapuram.

== Divinity and higher studies ==
In 1969, Rev. Dr. Gladstone joined the United Theological College [UTC, Bangalore – the only autonomous college under the Senate of Serampore College] where he received a Bachelor of Divinity degree. After finishing his studies in divinity in 1972 he again enrolled at UTC where, in 1975, he obtained a Master of Theology degree in the discipline of church history.

== Ordination and lecturership ==
After returning from Bangalore, Rev. Dr. Gladstone was ordained as a priest of the Diocese of South Kerala of the Church of South India on 20 July 1975.

The diocese designated him as Youth Pastor and thereafter, Gladstone was assigned a teaching task at the Kerala United Theological Seminary, [KUTS – affiliated to the Senate of Serampore College] Thiruvananthapuram.

== Research studies ==
Later in the year 1978, Rev. Dr. Gladstone took study leave from KUTS and proceeded to the University of Hamburg in Germany for research studies in church history.

In 1983, the University of Hamburg awarded him a Doctorate of Theology degree magna cum laude. His doctoral thesis was entitled Protestant Christianity and People's Movements in Kerala, 1850–1936 which was later published by the KUTS, Thiruvananthapuram in 1984.

== Return to KUTS ==
Subsequently, Rev. Dr. Gladstone returned to Thiruvananthapuram to resume his teaching responsibilities. In 1991 he became Principal of the KUTS, Thiruvananthapuram.

== Works ==
=== Church historian ===
Rev. Dr. Gladstone is a member of the Church History Association of India (CHAI), a body of church historians and has published more than 100 articles.

=== Senate responsibilities ===
Rev. Dr. Gladstone served as the President of the Senate of Serampore College, India's first university, from 2000 to 2005

== Bishopric ==
On 16 September 1997, Rev. Dr. Gladstone was consecrated as the Bishop in South Kerala.

== Moderatorship ==
During the XXXI session of the synod of the CSI held in Visakhapatnam from 11–14 January 2008, Rev. Dr. Gladstone was elected as the Moderator of the CSI for a biennium. He succeeded the Most Reverend B. P. Sugandhar (Bishop-in-Medak).

== Memberships and honours ==
=== Memberships ===
- Church History Association of India

=== Honours ===
In 2005, Rev. Vinod Victor and Rev. Gideon Sobhanam brought out a festschrift in honour of Gladstone entitled Shepherd of a Pilgrim People: Essays in Honour of Bishop J. W. Gladstone

In 2008 Canterbury Christ Church University, (established in 1962 by the Church of England with degree granting authority), admitted Rev. Dr. Gladstone to its honorary fellowship at Canterbury Cathedral on 1 February.

Academic offices
Preceded by Gnana Robinson	President Senate of Serampore College; 2000–2005	Succeeded by John S. Sadananda
Religious titles
Preceded by B. P. Sugandhar	Moderator Church of South India; 11 January 2008 – 10 January 2010	Succeeded by S. Vasantha Kumar
Preceded by Samuel Amirtham	Bishop in South Kerala Church of South India; 1997–	Succeeded by Incumbent
Educational offices
Preceded by Jacob Varghese	Principal Kerala United Theological Seminary; 1991–1997	Succeeded by K. K. Koshy
