= Clement Venkataramiah =

Anglican bishop

Clement William Venkataramiah was the Bishop of Nandyal.

Venkataramiah was educated at St Augustine's College, Canterbury; and ordained in 1930. He was the Warden at the SPG High School at Giddalur from 1930 until 1941; and Chaplain at Igatpuri until 1945. After further stints at Ahmedabad, Deolali, Poona, Parel, Kurduvadi, Byculla and Surat he was appointed Archdeacon of Bombay, serving from 1959 until 1963. He became the first diocesan Bishop of Nandyal in 1963; he was consecrated a bishop by Lakdasa De Mel, Bishop of Calcutta and Metropolitan of India in St Thomas' Cathedral, Bombay on the feast of St Mark (25 April) 1963. He was Bishop for four years.
