= M. M. Thomas =

Indian Christian theologian, social thinker, and activist (1916–1996)

- WCC Photo of M. M. Thomas in 1953
- Born: 15 May 1916; Kozhenchery, Kerala, India
- Died: 3 December 1996 (aged 80); Tiruvalla, Kerala, India
- Occupations: Theologian and Governor of Nagaland

Madathilparampil Mammen Thomas (1916—1996) was an Indian Christian theologian, social thinker, and activist. He served as Governor of the Indian State, Nagaland (1990–1992), and as the Chairperson of the Central Committee of World Council of Churches (1968–1975).

== Biography ==
Thomas was born on 15 May 1916 at Kozhenchery, Kerala India. His father Madathilparampil Mammen was a reformation leader, printer and publisher based in Kozhenchery, Kerala, and was involved in the Independence Movement in India during the Salt Satygraha. His mother was Ooriapadickal Mariamma, a school teacher. He was the eldest of nine children.

Thomas was raised in a Mar Thoma Syrian Church, in which his father was well known evangelist. In 1931, Thomas went to study Chemistry in a college in Trivandrum, Kerala, and had an evangelical spiritual experience. As a consequence, he became active in the Mar Thoma Youth Union and the Student Christian Movement, and became involved in evangelism among low-caste youth. He later attended the Union Theological Seminary in New York. Soon after obtaining his degree in 1935, he accepted the post of a teacher at Ashramam High School, Perumbavoor, run by the Mar Thoma Church, where the teachers used to pay part of their meager salary to the students from poor families. In 1937, instead of taking a lucrative job he went to Trivandrum, the capital of Kerala and started an orphanage there.

Thomas was the first full-time organizing secretary of Yuvajana Sakhyam (the Youth wing of the Mar Thoma Church) from 1945-47. He applied for ordination in the Mar Thoma Church, but that was rejected because of his membership in Communist party. At the same time he was rejected by the communist party because of his faith.

An amendment I proposed for the "Aim and Basis" of the Youth Christian Council of Action wanted it to "accept the Catholic Christian Faith and Marxian Scientific Socialism," reacting against "both Fundamentalism that is indifferent to science and social questions and the Liberal Social Gospel which denies the fact of sin" and to offer "the Orthodox Christian Faith as in the long run the only possible basis for social and scientific realism."
It was to pursue this double task of the Christian mission that I asked for ordination in my church and for membership in the Communist party. Both rejected me, for opposite reasons.

Thomas became known for his ecumenical work, first being on staff with the World Student Christian Federation in Geneva (1947-1953), then serving as a moderator of the Central committee of the World Council of Churches (1968-1975). He also served with the Christian Institute for the Study of Religion and Society from 1958 to 1975.

In 1990 he was appointed as Governor of Nagaland, a state with a large number of Christians, but later resigned in 1992.

He was conferred with the honorary doctorate degree by the University of Uppsala in 1978. He was living at Manjadi, Tiruvalla. He died on 3 December 1996 and was laid to rest at Tiruvalla, Kerala.

== Works ==
1. Secular Ideologies and the Secular Meaning of Christ (Madras: Christian Literature Society, 1976)
2. The acknowledged Christ of the Indian Renaissance (1969 SCM Press, London)
3. Risking Christ for Christ's Sake (1987)
4. Nagas towards 2000
5. Response to Tyranny
6. The Indian church: identity and fulfilment (contributor) (1971)
7. Towards a theology of contemporary ecumenism : a collection of addresses to ecumenical gatherings (1947-1975)

== See also ==
- Paul David Devanandan
