= Diocese of Rayalaseema of the Church of South India =

Diocese of the Church of South India in Andhra Pradesh, India

Diocese of Rayalaseema

Location
- Country: India
- Territory: Civil districts of Chittoor, Anantapur, Kurnool, and Cuddapah, Andhra Pradesh
- Residence: Kadapa
- Deaneries: 24
- Subdivisions: 78
- Headquarters: Kadapa

Statistics
- Churches: 78

Information
- Denomination: Church of South India (A Uniting church comprising Wesleyan Methodist, Congregational, Calvinist and Anglican missionary societies – SPG, WMMS, LMS, Basel Mission, CMS, and the Church of England)
- Established: 15 July 1950
- Dissolved: Cuddapah Diocese and Anantapur-Kurnool Diocese
- Cathedral: Kadapa didn't has a Cathedral (Its CSI Central Church, Kadapa).
- Language: Telugu
- Calendar: Gregorian

Leadership
- Parent church: Church of South India Trust Association
- Patriarch: Most.Rev. Dharmaraj Rasalam, CSI (Moderator)
- The Right Reverend: Peyyala Issac Vara Prasad, CSI
- Bishops emeritus: B. D. Prasada Rao

Website
- http://csirayalaseemadiocese.com/

Rayalaseema Diocese is a diocese of Church of South India in Andhra Pradesh state of India.The diocese one among the 22 dioceses of Church of South India, a United Protestant denomination.

== History ==
Rayalaseema diocese was carved on 15 July 1950 out of then Cuddapah Diocese and Anantapur-Kurnool Diocese of the Church of South India.

== Bishops of the Diocese ==
*Anantapur-Kurnool Diocese

From^{[A]}	Until^{[B]}	Incumbent	Notes (earned theological credentials)
15.9.1947	March 1950	Bunyan Joseph	

*Cuddapah Diocese

From^{[A]}	Until^{[B]}	Incumbent	Notes (earned theological credentials)
27.9.1947	14.7.1950	H. Sumitra	B.D. (Serampore)

*Rayalaseema Diocese (Integration of Anantapur-Kurnool Diocese and Cuddapah Diocese)

From^{[A]}	Until^{[B]}	Incumbent	Notes (earned theological credentials)
15.7.1950	1963	H. Sumitra	B.D. (Serampore)
1963	1976	See vacant (overseen by the Church of South India Synod)	
1976	1996	L. V. Azariah	B.D. (Serampore), Th. M. (WTS)
1996	2004	C. B. M. Frederick	B.D. (Serampore)
2004	2006	See vacant (overseen by the Church of South India Synod:)	
2006	2012	K. B. Yesu Vara Prasad	B.D. (Serampore)
2012	2013	See vacant (overseen by the Church of South India Synod:)	
2013	2019	B. D. Prasada Rao	B.D. (Serampore), M.Th. (Serampore)
2021	present	P. Issac Vara Prasad	B. Th. (Serampore)
