= Emani Sambayya =

- Born: 1 July 1905; Bodipalem, Guntur district, Andhra Pradesh
- Died: 1972 (aged 67); Bengaluru, Karnataka
- Other names: Canon Sambayya
- Education: United Theological College, Bengaluru; University of Calcutta, Kolkata; Union Theological Seminary in the City of New York, New York; Westcott House, Cambridge
- Church: Church of North India
- Ordained: 1940
- Writings: See Section
- Congregations served: Christ Church, Byculla (1939–1940); St. Paul's Cathedral (1954)
- Offices held: Warden, Wesley Boys High School, Secunderabad (1932–1935); Lecturer, Bishop's College, Calcutta (1941–1968)
- Title: Reverend Doctor

Canon Emani Sambayya (1905–1972) was an Anglican Priest, who was born in Bodipalem in Guntur District, Andhra Pradesh. He has been described as an "eloquent speaker and a gifted writer."

== Early life and education ==
Emani Sambayya was born in Bodipalem in Andhra Pradesh on 25 July 1905.

=== Graduate studies ===
In 1928, Emani began pursuing theological studies at the United Theological College, Bengaluru earning a graduate degree (BD) in 1932.

=== Post-graduate studies ===
Sambayya also enrolled for a post-graduate degree in MA under the University of Calcutta in 1932 completing it by 1935.

In 1938, Sambayya went to the Westcott House, Cambridge, for a diploma course.

In 1949, Sambayya was sent to the Union Theological Seminary in the City of New York for post-graduate studies in Moral Theology. In the continuing year, he was awarded an S.T.M. Sambayya's post-graduate dissertation was entitled The Eucharistic doctrine of Richard Hooker and Herbert Throndike

== Contribution ==
Emani Sambayya first served as the Secretary of the Student Christian Movement and was based in Allahabad from 1935 to 1938.

In 1939, he was Deacon at Christ Church, Byculla. In the succeeding year, he was ordained as a Minister of the Anglican Church in India.

=== Anglicanism ===
Emani Sambayya, although baptised into Methodism, chose to get ordained as an Anglican Priest. In Anglicanism, he felt a sense of togetherness as it was a mix of Catholic and Reformed traditions. Kevin Ward in A History of Global Anglicanism mentions this particular aspect which Sambayya endorsed.

Inspired by Anglicanism, Sambayya wrote The Genius of the Anglican Communion in 1948.

=== Theological education ===
From 1941 through 1968, Sambayya taught Theology at Bishop's College, Kolkata. He was first made a Lecturer in 1941 replacing Rev. John William Sadiq. In 1949, he was sent to the Union Theological Seminary in the city of New York for post-graduate studies in Moral Theology.

Immediately after his return from New York, Sambayya was made the Vice-Principal in place of Canon Manuel. From 1959 through 1968 he was Principal of Bishop's College, Kolkata.

During the period at Bishop's College, Sambayya's articles began appearing in the Indian Journal of Theology.

Articles

- Touching the Untouchables.
- The Christian Message and the Non-Christian Religions.

Books

- The Eucharistic Doctrine of Richard Hooker and Herbert Throndike (1950).
- Faith and Conduct: An Introduction to Moral Theology, Christian Students Library, Chennai, 1965.

=== Senate of Serampore ===
India's first University, the Senate of Serampore College (University) in West Bengal conferred upon Emani Sambayya an honorary doctorate in 1961

Emani Sambayya also served as the President of the Senate of Serampore College (University) in 1968.

== Retirement and death ==
In 1972, the Calcutta Municipal Gazette reported that Sambayya died while living in his residence in Bengaluru.

== See also ==
- Rev. Dr. B. V. Subbamma
- Rev. Yisu Das Tiwari
- Bishop N. D. Ananda Rao Samuel
- Rev. Fr. Dr. D. S. Amalorpavadass
- Bishop Victor Premasagar

Educational offices
Preceded by S. J. Samartha 1967	President, Senate of Serampore College (University); 1968	Succeeded by A. K. Mundle 1969
