= Vasant P. Dandin =

Vasant P. Dandin was the second Bishop of Northern Karnataka of the Church of South India:

Dandin was born on 22 April 1934, in Dharwad. He was educated at Karnataka University. In 1992 he became Moderator of the Church of South India.
