= Wesley Ariarajah =

Sri Lankan theologian

Seevaratham Wesley Ariarajah is a theologian, professor, and former director of inter-religions relations at the World Council of Churches (WCC).

== Career ==
Ariarajah studied Theology at King's College London. A Methodist minister from Sri Lanka, he served both in the pastoral ministry of the church and as lecturer in the history of religions and New Testament in Sri Lanka. In 1981 he was invited to join the staff of the World Council of Churches, where he led the Councils Interfaith Dialogue for over ten years. From 1992 he served as the Deputy General Secretary of the WCC. He has given lectures, conducted seminars, led conferences in many parts of the world and today is professor at Drew University, Madison, USA.

== Publications ==
He is the author of the following books, amongst others:

- The Bible and People of Other Faiths, Geneva: WCC Publications, 1985.
- Hindus and Christians : A Century of Protestant Thought, Grand Rapids: Eerdmans, 1991
- Gospel and Culture, An Ongoing Discussion in the Ecumenical Movement, Geneva: WCC, 1994
- Did I Betray the Gospel? The Letters of Paul and the Place of Women, Geneva: WCC, 1996.
- Not Without My Neighbor- Issues in Inter-religious Relations, Geneva: WCC, 1999.
