= Michael Hollis =

The Rt Rev Arthur Michael Hollis (23 June 1899 – 11 February 1986) was an eminent Anglican clergyman in the mid 20th century.

A member of a distinguished family, His father was George Arthur Hollis, bishop of Taunton, his brother Christopher Hollis MP and his father in law Andrew Ewbank Burn a former dean of Salisbury. he was educated at Leeds Grammar School and Trinity College, Oxford. Ordained in 1924 his first post was as a preacher at St Andrew's, Huddersfield. He was then chaplain of Hertford College, Oxford and a lecturer in Theology at the University, being elected Fellow in 1926. From 1931 he was an SPG Missionary in Tinnevelly before returning to England to be perpetual curate of St Mary's Charlton Kings. Appointed the bishop of Madras in 1942 he served the diocese until 1954. After that he was professor of Church History at the United Theological College (Bangalore), 1955–60. His final post was as rector of Todwick, where he also served as an assistant bishop within the Diocese of Sheffield.

== Archives ==
A collection of archival material related to the Rt Rev Arthur Michael Hollis can be found at the Cadbury Research Library, University of Birmingham.

== Notes ==
Anglican Communion titles
Preceded by Edward Harry Mansfield Waller	Bishop of Madras; 1942–1954	Succeeded by David Chellappa
