= Arnold Legg =

CSI bishop

The Right Reverend Arnold Legg
- Bishop of South Kerala & South Travancore diocese
- Church: Church of South India
- Diocese: South Kerala & South Travancore diocese
- Installed: 1947

Arnold Legg was a bishop in the Church of South India, as Travancore Diocese and the inaugural Bishop of South Kerala.

Legg was a LMS missionary serving at South Travancore and Trivandrum. He was consecrated our first bishop at St. George's Cathedral, Madras on 27 September 1947. In 1959, the diocese was split into South Kerala and Kanyakumari dioceses, with Legg continuing as bishop of South Kerala.
