= Lesslie Newbigin =

British theologian and bishop in India

The Right Reverend Lesslie Newbigin
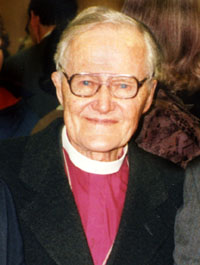
- Bishop Lesslie Newbigin in 1996
- Church: Church of South India and United Reformed Church
- Other posts: Bishop of the Diocese of Madurai-Ramnad (1947–1958); Bishop of the Diocese of Madras (1965–1974); Moderator of the General Assembly of the United Reformed Church (1978–1979)

Orders
- Ordination: July 1936
- Consecration: 1947

Personal details
- Born: James Edward Lesslie Newbigin; 8 December 1909 Newcastle upon Tyne, England
- Died: 30 January 1998 (aged 88) Herne Hill, London, England
- Denomination: Presbyterian / Reformed
- Spouse: Helen Henderson
- Occupation: Theologian, missionary, author
- Education: Queens' College, Cambridge; Westminster College, Cambridge

James Edward Lesslie Newbigin (8 December 1909 – 30 January 1998) was a British theologian, missiologist, missionary and author. Though originally ordained within the Church of Scotland, Newbigin spent much of his career serving as a Presbyterian missionary in India and became affiliated with the Church of South India and the United Reformed Church, becoming one of the Church of South India's first bishops. A prolific author who wrote on a wide range of theological topics, Newbigin is best known for his contributions to missiology and ecclesiology. He is also known for his involvement in both the dialogue regarding ecumenism and the Gospel and Our Culture movement. Many scholars also believe his work laid the foundations for the contemporary missional church movement, and it is said his stature and range is comparable to the "Fathers of the Church".

== Biography ==
=== Early life and education ===
Newbigin was born in 1909 in Newcastle upon Tyne, England. He was educated at Leighton Park School, the Quaker boarding school in Reading, Berkshire. He went to Queens' College, Cambridge in 1928, during which time he converted to Christianity. Having graduated, he moved to Glasgow to work with the Student Christian Movement (SCM) in 1931. He returned to Cambridge in 1933 to train for the ministry at Westminster College, and in July 1936 he was ordained by the Presbytery of Edinburgh to work as a Church of Scotland missionary at the Madras Mission.

A month later he married Helen Henderson, and in September 1936 they both set off for India where they had one son and three daughters. He also had a sister, Frances, who was a regular worshipper at Jesmond URC (formerly Presbyterian), Newcastle upon Tyne.

=== Career as Bishop ===
In 1947, the fledgling Church of South India, an ecumenical church formed from several Protestant churches, appointed Newbigin as one of their first bishops in the Diocese of Madurai Ramnad - a surprising career path for a Presbyterian minister. In 1959 he became the General Secretary of the International Missionary Council for six years. He oversaw its integration with the World Council of Churches, of which he became Associate General Secretary. He remained in Geneva until 1965, when he returned to India as Bishop of Madras, where he stayed until he retired in 1974. He was a pacifist.

=== Career as lecturer and writer ===
Newbigin and his wife Helen left India in 1974 and made their way overland back to the UK using local buses, carrying two suitcases and a rucksack. They then settled in Birmingham, where Newbigin became a lecturer in Mission at the Selly Oak Colleges for five years. Of the British denominations linked with the Church of South India, he chose to join the United Reformed Church (URC), which is the result of a merger which included the Presbyterian Church of England. In retirement he took on the pastorate of Winson Green URC, located opposite the gates of HM Prison Birmingham and supporting people visiting prisoners. He was Moderator of the General Assembly of the URC for the year 1978–9. During this time, he preached at Elizabeth II's Scottish Country House Balmoral Castle and continued the prolific writing career that established him as one of the most respected and significant theologians of the twentieth century.

After decades in India, he was deeply affected by what he saw as the destructive consumerism in the UK.

He is especially remembered for the time after he returned to England from his long missionary service and travel, when he tried to communicate the serious need for the church to once again take the Gospel to post-Christian Western culture, which he viewed not as a secular society without gods but as a pagan society with false gods. From Newbigin's perspective, western cultures, particularly modern scientific cultures, had uncritically come to believe in objective knowledge that was unaffected by faith-based axiomatic presuppositions. Newbigin challenged these ideas of neutrality and also the closely related discussion concerning the distinction between facts and values, both of which emerged from the Enlightenment. It was during this time that he wrote two of his most important works, Foolishness to the Greeks and The Gospel in a Pluralist Society in which the strong influence of thinkers such as Alasdair MacIntyre and Michael Polanyi is apparent. He returned to these themes in his small volume Proper Confidence: Faith, Doubt and Certainty in Christian Discipleship, published in 1995, in the closing years of his life. Besides MacIntyre and Polanyi, the influence of Martin Buber and Hans Wilhelm Frei is also noticeable in Newbigin's work.

Milestone In his mission time he influenced that first 'mercy petition' for the people who wait for death punishment in independent India, Tamil Nadu.

=== Final years ===
After he retired, Newbigin regularly had theology students come over from King's College London to read chapters of theological texts to him since his vision had diminished. Despite his fading eyesight, he continued preaching; he told parishioners at St Paul's Church in nearby Herne Hill that when he preached, he would prepare his entire homily in his head long before he was scheduled to give it, and preach from memory. Sydney Carter was a regular attender of the services when he preached. He died in West Dulwich, London, England, on 30 January 1998 and was cremated at West Norwood Cemetery. At Newbigin's funeral service on 7 February 1998 his close friend Dr. Dan Beeby said, "Not too long ago, some children in Selly Oak were helped to see the world upside down when the aged bishop stood on his head! Not a single one of his many doctorates or his CBE fell out of his pockets. His episcopacy was intact."

== Legacy ==
Theologian and Lesslie Newbigin historian Geoffrey Wainwright commented that when the history of the 20th century church is written, Lesslie Newbigin should be considered one of the top ten or twelve most influential persons.

In 2008, Western Theological Seminary in Holland, Michigan opened the Newbigin House of Studies with City Church San Francisco, focused specifically on leadership development of laity.

Lesslie Newbigin is honored with a commemoration on the liturgical calendar of the Anglican Church in North America on January 29.

== Bibliography ==
=== Autobiography ===
- Unfinished Agenda, St Andrew's Press, 1993, ISBN 978-0-7152-0679-9

=== Major works ===
- A South India Diary, SCM, 1951 (revised 1960)
- The Household of God: Lectures on the Nature of the Church, SCM, 1953 (reprinted Paternoster, 1998, ISBN 978-0-85364-935-9)
- Sin and Salvation, 1956, SCM
- A Faith for this One World? (1961)
- Trinitarian Doctrine for Today's Mission, Edinburgh House Press, 1963 (reprinted Paternoster, 1998, ISBN 978-0-85364-797-3)
- Honest Religion for Secular Man, SCM, 1966
- The Finality of Christ, SCM, 1969
- The Good Shepherd, Faith Press, 1977
- The Open Secret: An Introduction to the Theology of Mission, SPCK/Eerdmans, 1978, ISBN 978-2-8254-0784-4 [2nd ed. Eerdmans, 1995, ISBN 978-0-8028-0829-5]
- The Light Has Come, Eerdmans, 1982, ISBN 978-1-871828-31-3
- The Other Side of 1984, World Council of Churches, 1983, ISBN 978-2-8254-0784-4
- Foolishness to the Greeks: Gospel and Western Culture, Eerdmans/SPCK, 1986, ISBN 978-0-281-04232-6
- The Gospel in a Pluralist Society, SPCK/Eerdmans/WCC, 1989, ISBN 978-0-281-04435-1
- Truth to Tell: The Gospel as Public Truth, SPCK, 1991, ISBN 0-8028-0607-4
- A Word in Season: Perspectives on Christian World Missions, edited by Eleanor Jackson, Saint Andrew Press/Eerdmans, 1994, ISBN 978-0-7152-0704-8
- Proper Confidence: Faith, Doubt and Certainty in Christian Discipleship, SPCK, 1995, ISBN 978-0-281-04915-8
- Truth and Authority in Modernity, Gracewing Publishing, 1996, ISBN 978-1-56338-168-3
- Signs amid the Rubble: The Purposes of God in Human History, edited and introduced by Geoffrey Wainwright, Eerdmans, 2003, ISBN 978-0-8028-0989-6

=== Popular works ===
- A Walk Through the Bible, SPCK/Westminster John Knox Press, 2000, ISBN 978-1-57383-357-8
- Discovering Truth in a Changing World, Alpha International, 2003, ISBN 978-1-904074-35-9
- Living Hope in a Changing World, Alpha International, 2003, ISBN 978-1-904074-36-6

== Archives ==
Papers of Lesslie Newbigin are held at the Cadbury Research Library, University of Birmingham.

== See also ==
- Missiology
- Ecclesiology
- Theology

Religious titles
Preceded by Hospet Sumitra; 1952-1954; P. Solomon; 1964-1966	Deputy Moderator; Church of South India; 1954-1960; 1966-1974	Succeeded by A. G. Jebaraj; 1960-1964; Solomon Doraiswamy; 1974-1980
Preceded by -	Bishop in Madurai-Ramnad; Church of South India; 1947–1958	Succeeded by George Devadoss; 1959-1978
Preceded by D. Chellappa; 1955-1964	Bishop in Madras; Church of South India; 1965–1974	Succeeded by Sundar Clarke; 1974-1989
Other offices
Preceded by -	General Secretary; International Missionary Council; 1959-1961	Succeeded by -
