= Diocese of Erode-Salem of the Church of South India =

Protestant diocese in Tamil Nadu, India

Diocese of Erode-Salem

Location
- Country: India
- Ecclesiastical province: Church of South India

Statistics
- Congregations: 105

Information
- Secular priests: 87

Current leadership
- Bishop: Rt. Rev. Dr. J. Victor Raj

Website
- erodesalem.csi1947.com

The Erode-Salem Diocese is one of the 32 diocese's of the Church of South India (CSI), a United Protestant denomination.

The diocese covers the Salem part of Tamilnadu and consists of CSI churches in the areas Erode, Salem, Namakkal, Krishnagiri and Dharmapuri districts.

== History ==
This new diocese was established from the former diocese of Coimbatore, which previously included the Erode and Salem districts on 16 August 2025.

== Bishops of the Erode-Salem Diocese ==
1. A. Jacob Livingston (2025 - till died on 14–02–2026)
2. J. Victor Raj (from 01-08-2026)

== See also ==
- Christianity in India
- Church of South India
- Church of North India
- Christianity in Tamil Nadu
- Christianity in Kanyakumari district
- Christianity in Kerala
- South Kerala Diocese
- Kollam-Kottarakkara Diocese
- Madhya Kerala Diocese
- Malabar Diocese
- Tirunelveli Diocese
- diocese of Coimbatore
