= Jose George (bishop) =

The Right Reverend Jose George
- Bishop of the CSI Kollam-Kottarakara Diocese
- Church: Church of South India
- Predecessor: Oommen George

Orders
- Consecration: 6 August 2025

Personal details
- Born: Kerala, India

Jose George is the current bishop of the Kollam-Kottarakara Diocese of the Church of South India (CSI). He was consecrated and installed in August 2025, succeeding Bishop Oommen George as the second leader of the diocese since its formation in 2017.

== Ecclesiastical career ==
Prior to his episcopal election, Jose George served as a senior presbyter within the CSI South Kerala and Kollam regions. His ministry focused on rural mission work and pastoral care.

=== Election and Consecration ===
Following the retirement of the diocese's first bishop, the CSI Synod met to elect a successor. Jose George was formally elected and subsequently consecrated on 6 August 2025 at the CSI Christ Church Cathedral in Kollam.

The installation ceremony was presided over by the Moderator of the Church of South India, Most Rev. K. Reuben Mark, alongside other members of the Episcopal Synod.
