= Richard Lipp =

- Bishop of North Kerala Diocese of the Church of South India
- Church: Christian
- See: Church of South India
- In office: 1954–1959
- Predecessor: Thomas Geoffrey Stuart Smith
- Successor: T. B. Benjamin

Orders
- Consecration: 1954

Richard Lipp was an Anglican bishop: he was bishop of North Kerala from 1954 to 1959.
