= K. C. Seth =

Anglican bishop

- Bishop of North Kerala Diocese of the Church of South India
- Church: Christian
- See: Church of South India
- In office: 1978–1991
- Predecessor: T. B. Benjamin
- Successor: P. G. Kuruvilla

Orders
- Consecration: 1978

K. C. Seth was an Anglican bishop: he was the fourth bishop of North Kerala.
