= George Issac =

Anglican bishop from Kerala, India

- Bishop of North Kerala Diocese of the Church of South India
- Church: Christian
- See: Church of South India
- In office: 1999–2006
- Predecessor: P. G. Kuruvilla
- Successor: K. P. Kuruvilla

Orders
- Consecration: 1999

George Issac (1944–2013) was an Anglican bishop: he was the fifth Bishop of North Kerala.

Issac was on 4 August 1944, at Fort Kochi, and educated at Leonard Theological Seminary in Jabalpur. He was ordained a deacon in 1968 and priest in 1969. He was appointed a chaplain at Christian Medical College Vellore . He then taught Chicago Theological Seminary until his episcopal appointment.

He died at CMC Vellore, where he was undergoing treatment for cancer.
