= K. P. Kuruvilla =

Rt.Rev. Dr. K.P. Kuruvilla
- Bishop of North Kerala Diocese of the Church of South India
- Church: Christian
- See: Church of South India
- In office: 2007-2013
- Predecessor: George Issac
- Successor: Baker Nainan Fenn

Orders
- Consecration: 2007

Rt. Rev. Dr. K. P. Kuruvilla was an Anglican bishop: he was the fifth Bishop of North Kerala.
