= Geoffrey Stuart Smith =

Anglican bishop

- Bishop in North Kerala
- Church: Christian
- See: Church of South India
- In office: 1947–1953
- Predecessor: Inaugural appointment
- Successor: Richard Lipp
- Other posts: Archdeacon of Mavelikkara (1939–1947); Assistant Bishop of Chelmsford (1961–1966); Assistant Bishop of Leicester (1966–1973)

Orders
- Ordination: 1926
- Consecration: 1947

Thomas Geoffrey Stuart Smith (called Geoffrey; surnamed Smith or Stuart-Smith; 28 February 1901 – 8 December 1981) was an Anglican bishop in the 20th century.

Smith was educated at Felsted School; Jesus College, Cambridge; and Ridley Hall, Cambridge. He was ordained deacon in 1925, and Priest in 1926. He began his career with a curacy at St Mary Magdalene, Bermondsey after which he was Chaplain of Ridley Hall, Cambridge. He was Vice Principal of Cambridge Nicholson Institute and Mission, Kottayam (Kottayam Diocesan College) from 1930 to 1939; Archdeacon of Mavelikkara from 1939 to 1947; and Bishop of North Kerala from 1947 to 1953. Returning to England he held incumbencies at Burwell, Danbury and Swithland. While at Danbury, he was also an Assistant Bishop of Chelmsford (1961–1966); and at Swithland he served as an Assistant Bishop of Leicester (1966–1973).
