= P. G. Kuruvilla =

Anglican bishop

Kuruvilla
- Bishop of North Kerala Diocese of the Church of South India
- Church: Christian
- See: Church of South India
- In office: 1991–1997
- Predecessor: K. C. Seth
- Successor: George Issac

Orders
- Consecration: 1991

P. G. Kuruvilla was an Anglican bishop: he was the fifth bishop of North Kerala.
