= Oommen George =

21st-century Indian bishop

The Right Reverend Oommen George
- Bishop Emeritus of Kollam-Kottarakkara
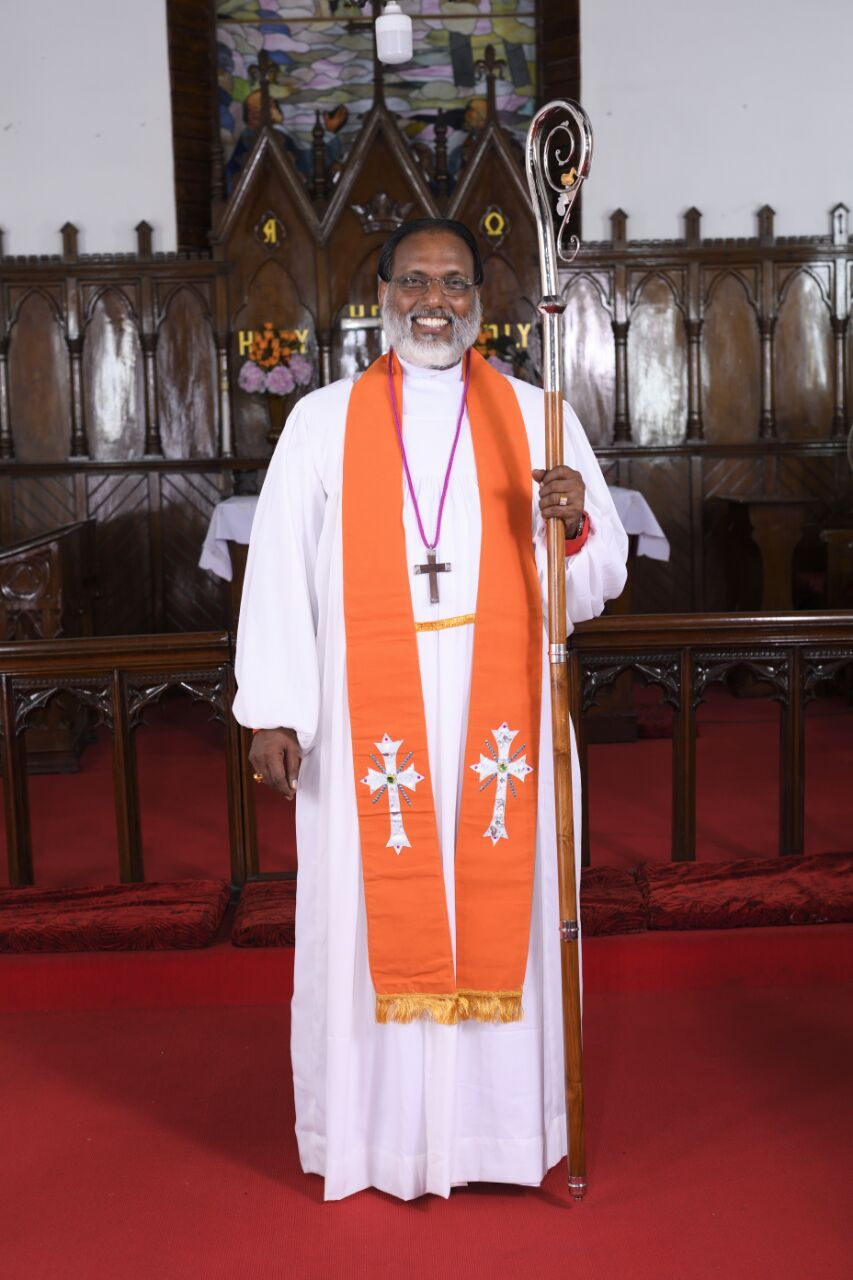
- Church: Church of South India
- Diocese: Diocese of Kollam-Kottarakkara
- In office: 2017 – 2023

Orders
- Ordination: by M. C. Mani
- Consecration: 10 September 2017 by Thomas K. Oommen (principal consecrator)
- Rank: Bishop

Personal details
- Born: 21 July 1956 (age 70) Kunnamthanam, Kerala, India

Oommen George (born 21 July 1956) is the Bishop of the Kollam-Kottarakkara Diocese of Church of South India. He was the former clergy secretary of CSI Madhya Kerala Diocese and the vicar of Ascension Church Kanjikkuzhy when he was selected as the first bishop of Kollam - Kottarakkara Diocese. He is the son of late K C George Upadeshi, Malayil, Punnakadu an evangelist of the CSI Church and Mallappally Panavelil Rachel. Aleyamma Oommen is his wife and Diana, Lida and Leena are his daughters.

== Early years ==
After early education at the local schools, Rev. George obtained his bachelor's degree in Theology (B.Th) from Kerala United Theological Seminary, Kannammoola and D. Min. from McCormick Theological Seminary, Chicago. He has served on the various bodies of the church including the CSI North American Council as its vice president. He has been an active presence in the ecumenical scene. Bishop Oommen George had worked in various capacities as member of CSI Synod, CSI Synod Mission and Evangelical Committee; executive committee member of Madhya Kerala Diocese; vice president of CSI North American Council; convener of Shalom Residence Project; secretary of the Mission Board of Diocese; secretary of the Pastoral Board; vice president of the Laity organisation and convener of the Diocese.

== Bishopric ==
George was selected by a Synod presided over by CSI Moderator Bishop Thomas K Oommen at the Synod headquarters of CSI in Chennai. The consecration of the bishop was conducted at Kollam CSI Cathedral on Sunday under the chief patronage of Oommen. During his consecration, he was the secretary of the regional Synod.
