= T. B. Benjamin =

Anglican Bishop

- Bishop of North Kerala Diocese of the Church of South India
- Church: Christian
- See: Church of South India
- In office: 1960–1977
- Predecessor: Richard Lipp
- Successor: K. C. Seth

Orders
- Consecration: 1960

Personal details
- Born: 1908
- Died: 2009 (aged 100–101)

T.B. Benjamin was an Anglican bishop: he was the third Bishop of North Kerala.

Benjamin was ordained in 1937. He was Vicar of the CSI Cathedral, Kozhikode and corporate manager of the CMS schools before his consecration.
