= Kollam-Kottarakkara Diocese of the Church of South India =

United Protestant diocese in India

Diocese of Kollam-Kottarakkara

Location
- Country: India
- Ecclesiastical province: Church of South India

Information
- Cathedral: CSI Christ Cathedral, Kollam

Current leadership
- Bishop: Jose George

The Kollam-Kottarakkara Diocese is one of the twenty-four dioceses of the Church of South India. It comprises parishes in Attingal, Vembayam, Chenkulam, Kundara, Kottarakkara, Manjakkala, Punalur and Ayiranelloor regions, which span the Thiruvananthapuram, Kollam and Pathanamthitta districts. The Church of South India is a United Protestant denomination.

== History of the Diocese ==
Kollam-Kottarakara diocese was formed on 9 April 2015 after a special conference of the Church synod in Chennai. The parishes of the Kollam-Kottarakara diocese were formerly part of the South Kerala Diocese.soon after the firmationew of the Diocese Rt. Rev. Dharmaraj Rasalam was appointested as Moderaters Commissary.

=== Officers of the Diocese ===
Rev Jose George- Bishop.

Mr.Daniel Elampal- Lay Secretary.

Mr.Nibu Jacob Varkey- Treasurer.

Mr. G Jose - Registrar

== See also ==
- Church of South India
- MadhyaKerala Diocese
- East Kerala Diocese
- South Kerala Diocese
- North Kerala Diocese
- Kochi Diocese
- Christianity in Kerala
