= Historic episcopate (Anglican views) =

Anglican views on how Christian ministry has been passed down from the Apostles

The historic episcopate is the understanding that the Christian ministry has descended from the apostles by a continuous transmission through the episcopates. While other churches have relatively rigid interpretations for the requirements of this transmission, the Anglican Communion accepts a number of beliefs for what constitutes the episcopate.

In the sixteenth century, a solid body of Anglican opinion emerged which saw the theological importance of the historic episcopate but refused to 'unchurch' those churches which did not retain it. This was questioned during the earlier part of the seventeenth century, and the 1662 Act of Uniformity excluded from pastoral office in England any who lacked episcopal ordination. This was a reaction against the abolition of episcopacy during the Commonwealth period. The refusal of the Non-Jurors to swear allegiance to William III raised the question as to the nature of the Church and its relationship with the state and some theologians such as George Hickes and William Law appealed to an apostolic episcopate as its basis. This concept became part of the thought of the High Church but only came into real prominence with Newman and the Tractarians after 1833 when the possibility of Church reform and possibly disestablishment by parliamentary action became a reality. The tensions were increased by the "romanizing tendencies" of the Tractarians and later the Ritualists and Anglo-Catholics.

The historic episcopate has been among the major issues in schemes for church reunion such as the Church of South India and the Anglican–Methodist Conversations of the 1960s, which failed and were renewed informally in 1995 and led to a Covenant in 2003 (JIC).

== Concept ==
Outside Anglicanism, the standard understanding of the term historic episcopate (Note: The phrase "historic episcopate" is far more common in Anglican writings than "historical episcopate".) is that the Christian ministry has descended from the Apostles by a continuous transmission, and that this is the guarantee of grace in the sacraments and the very essence (esse) of the Church. Anglican Communion "has never officially endorsed any one particular theory of the origin of the historic episcopate, its exact relation to the apostolate, and the sense in which it should be thought of as God given, and in fact tolerates a wide variety of views on these points":

Apostolic succession is viewed not so much as conveyed mechanically through an unbroken chain of the laying-on of hands, but as expressing continuity with the unbroken chain of commitment, beliefs and mission starting with the first apostles; and as hence emphasising the enduring yet evolving nature of the Church.

— (CofE/pmreview)

The historic episcopate has been among the major issues in schemes for church reunion such as the Church of South India and the Anglican–Methodist Conversations of the 1960s which failed and were renewed informally in 1995 and led to the Anglican-Methodist Covenant in 2003 (JIC).

== History ==
=== From the Reformation (1533) to the Restoration (1662) ===
According to The Westminster Dictionary of Christian Theology, The Anglican Communion "retained episcopacy, believing it to be not merely an administrative expedient of contingent historical origin but an essential part of the church as founded by Christ." Its claim to apostolic succession is rooted in the Church of England's evolution as part of the Western Church. When Henry VIII broke away from the jurisdiction of Rome in 1533/4, the English Church retained the episcopal polity and apostolic succession inherent in its Catholic past; however, Protestant theology gained a certain foothold and under his successor, Edward VI what had been an administrative schism became a Protestant reformation under the guiding hand of Thomas Cranmer. Although care was taken to maintain the unbroken sequence of episcopal consecrations, particularly in the case of Matthew Parker after Elizabeth I's coming to the throne, apostolic succession was not seen as a major concern: English Reformers such as Richard Hooker rejected the Catholic position that Apostolic Succession is divinely commanded or necessary for true Christian ministry. The preface to the Ordinal limits itself to stating historical reasons why episcopal orders are to 'be continued and reverently used in the Church of England'. The "foreign Reformed [Presbyterian] Churches" were genuine ones despite the lack of apostolic succession because they had been abandoned by their bishops at the Reformation.

This view was of the reformed churches was questioned during the earlier part of the seventeenth century and the 1662 Act of Uniformity formally excluded from pastoral office in England any who lacked episcopal ordination but this was a reaction against the abolition of episcopacy in the Commonwealth period.

=== From the Glorious Revolution (1688) to the Great Reform Bill (1832) ===
After 1685 the practices of both James II and William III of England made it plain that the Church of England could no longer count on the 'godly prince' to maintain its identity and traditions, the 'High Church' clergy of the time began to look to the idea of apostolic succession as a basis for the church's life. For William Beveridge (Bp of St Asaph 1704–1708) the importance of this lay in the fact that Christ himself is "continually present at such imposition of hands; thereby transferring the same Spirit, which He had first breathed into His Apostles, upon others successively after them", but the doctrine did not really come to the fore until the time of the Tractarians.

=== From the Oxford Movement (1833) to the South India Debate (1955) ===
Newman laid great stress on apostolic succession: "We must necessarily consider none to be' 'really' 'ordained who has not been thus ordained". After quoting this, Ramsey continues: "With romantic enthusiasm, the Tractarians propagated this doctrine. In doing so they involved themselves in some misunderstandings of history and in some confusion of theology". He goes on to explain that they ascribed to early Anglican authors a far more exclusive version of the doctrine than was the case, they blurred the distinction between succession in office (Irenaeus) and succession in consecration (Augustine); they spoke of apostolic succession as the channel of grace in a way that failed to do justice to His gracious activity within all the dispensations of the New Covenant. Newman, and after him, Charles Gore held that the episcopate was passed down from the apostles through men like Timothy and Titus to single bishops in particular localities (monarchial episcopacy). However, Bp. Lightfoot argued that monarchial episcopacy evolved upwards from a college of presbyters by the elevation of one of their number to be the episcopal president and A. C. Headlam laid great stress on Irenaeus' understanding of succession, which had been lost from sight behind the Augustinian 'pipe-line theory'.

The implications of the apostolic succession for the nature of the episcopate and the Church were spelt out by later Anglo-catholic writers: "There is, and can be no real and true Church apart from the one society which the apostles founded and which has been propagated only in the line of the episcopal succession" and "[a] Church stands or falls by the Apostolic Succession ... There has never been a Church without a bishop, and there never can be".

=== Recent developments ===
The Anglican–Roman Catholic International Commission report expressed broad agreement in the nature of apostolic succession as the ‘effective sign’ of the apostolicity of the whole people of God, living in fidelity to the teaching and mission of the apostles.

The modern debate divides three ways: between those who see the 'Historic Episcopate' to be constitutive of the Church (of the 'esse'); those who hold it is a question of its "well-being" (bene esse); and those who consider that it is necessary for the Church to be fully itself (plene esse). The Chicago-Lambeth Quadrilateral includes the "historic episcopate" as "essential to the visible unity of the church", but allows for its being adapted locally in its working to the varying needs of those who God calls into the unity of the Church. However, this has not meant a general commitment to the idea that in its absence there is no Church.

== See also ==
- Apostolicae curae

== Bibliography ==
- Archer, Stanley (1993), "Hooker on Apostolic Succession: The Two Voices", The Sixteenth Century Journal, 24 (1) (volume 24, issue 1 ed.): 67–74, doi:10.2307/2541798, JSTOR 2541798, "While he argues that the rank originated with the Apostles, enjoyed divine approval, and flourished throughout Christendom, he rejects the view inherent in the Catholic position that the office is divinely commanded or is a result of divine law."
- Carey, K. M. (1954), The Next Step|Dacre Press: A& C Black|Carey, K. M.|The Historic Episcopate
- "Review of the Dioceses, Pastoral and Related Measures", Cofe.anglican.org, Church of England, January 2004, archived from the original on 9 May 2006
- Evans; Wright, eds. (1991), The Anglican Tradition, SPCK
- Griffith Thomas, W. H. (1963), The Principles of Theology, Church Book Room Press
- Jay, Eric G. (1980), The Church, John Knox Press
- Joint Implementation Commission, History of the Covenant, archived from the original on 2013-08-06
- Montefiore, H. W. (1954). Carey, K.M. (ed.). The Historic Episcopate. Dacre Press: A& C Black.
- Neill, Stephen (1960), Anglicanism, Pelican
- Norris, Richard A. (1988). "Episcopacy". In Sykes, Stephen; Booty, John (eds.). The Study of Anglicanism. SPCK.
- Ramsey, Arthur Michael. (1960), From Gore to Temple, Longmans
- Sheldon, Henry C. (1909), Sacerdotalism in the Nineteenth Century, New York: Eaton & Mains
- Walker, A. Keith. (1973), William Law: His Life and Works, SPCK
- Webster, John B. (1988). "Ministry and Priesthood". In Sykes, Stephen; Booty, John (eds.). The Study of Anglicanism. SPCK.
