= Royce Manoj Kumar Victor =

CSI bishop

The Right Reverend Royce Manoj Kumar Victor
- Bishop of Malabar
- Church: Church of South India
- Diocese: Malabar
- Installed: 2016

Royce Manoj Kumar Victor is a bishop in the Church of South India. He has served as Bishop of Malabar since 2016.
