= Malabar Diocese of the Church of South India =

Diocese of the Church of South India in Kerala, India

Diocese of Malabar
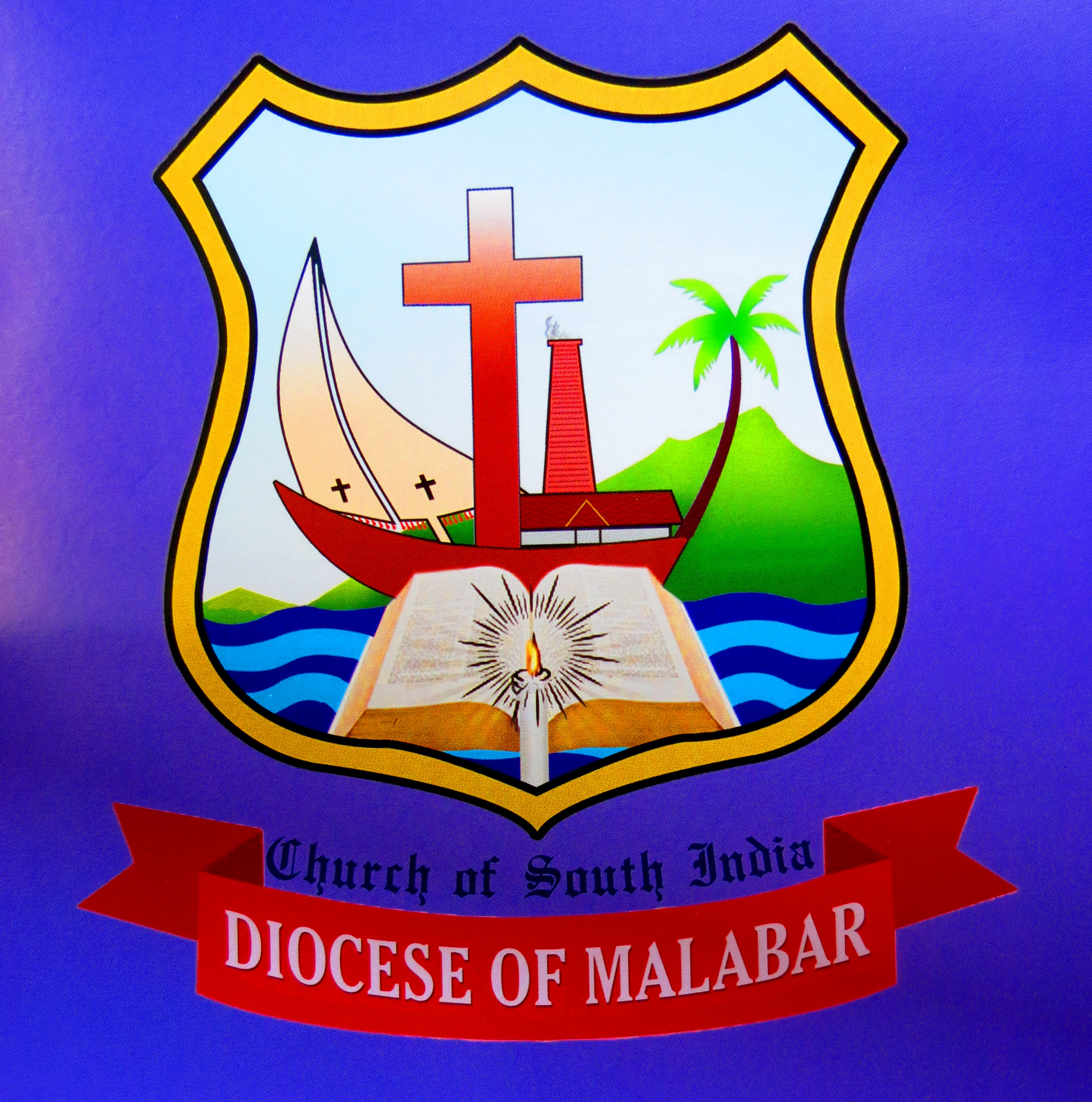

Location
- Country: India
- Ecclesiastical province: Church of South India

Information
- Cathedral: CSI Cathedral, Calicut

Current leadership
- Bishop: Rt Rev Dr Royce Manoj Victor

The Malabar Diocese is one of the twenty-four dioceses of the Church of South India covering the Malabar part of Kerala. The diocese consists of CSI churches in the areas Kannur, Wayanad, Calicut, part of Palakkad district and church in Goa. The cathedral church of the diocese is situated at Calicut and the Bishops House at Calicut. The Church of South India is a United Protestant denomination.

== History ==
Malabar Diocese was formed by bifurcating the erstwhile North Kerala Diocese in April 2015.

== Newsletter ==
Malabar Diocese publishes Sabhamitram magazine which is the official mouthpiece of the diocese.

== Bishops ==
North Kerala Diocese

- Rt Rev Thomas Geoffrey Stuart Smith
- Rt Rev Richard Lipp
- Rt Rev T. B. Benjamin (1960–1977)
- Rt Rev Dr K. C. Seth (1977–1991)
- Rt Rev Dr P. G. Kuruvilla (1991–1997)
- Rt Rev Dr George Issac (1999–2006)
- Rt Rev Dr K. P. Kuruvilla (2007–2013)
- Rt Rev B N Fenn (2013–2016)

Malabar Diocese

- Rt Rev Dr Royce Manoj Victor (2016–present)

== Notable CSI churches ==
=== CSI Cathedral Church, Calicut ===
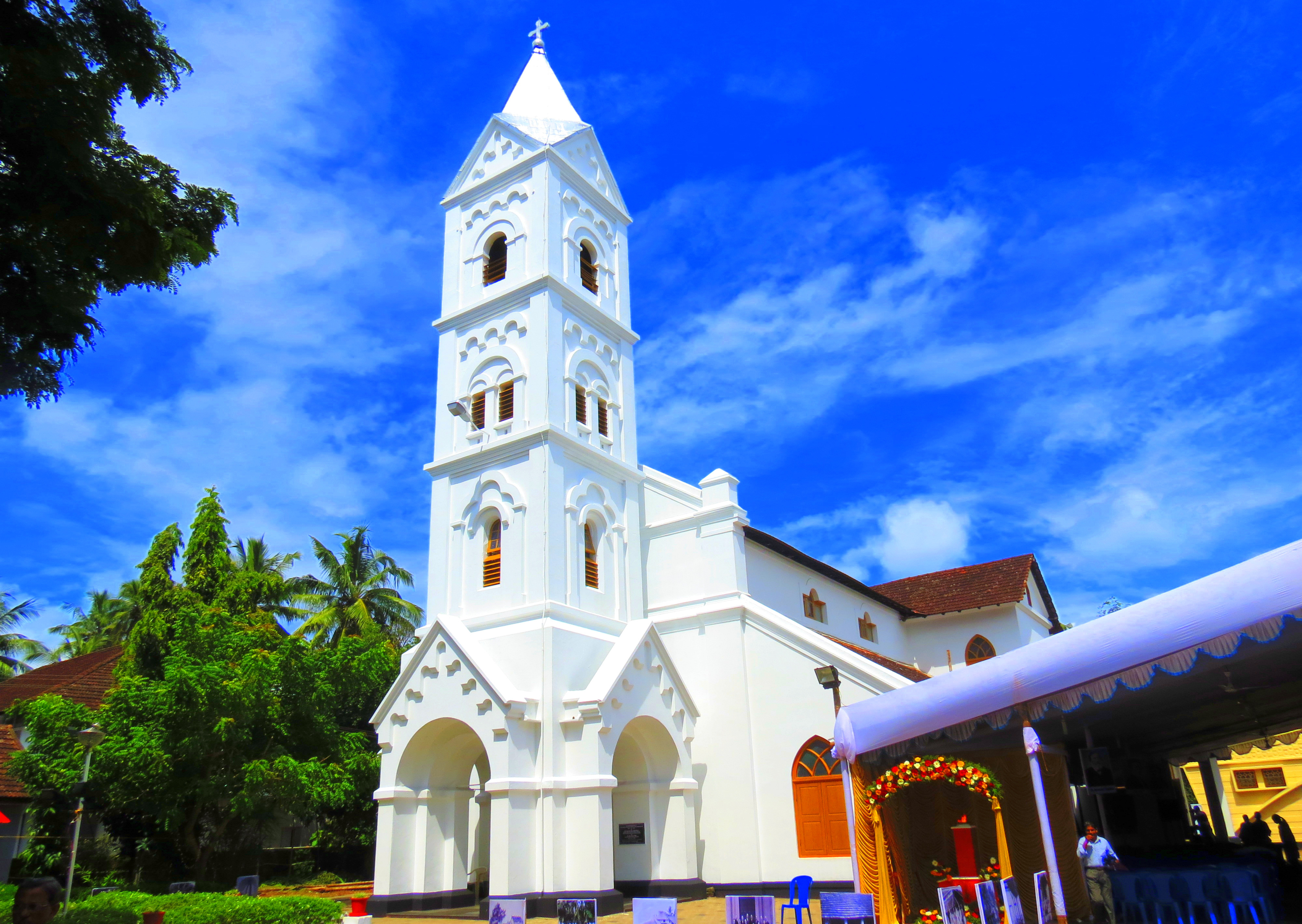
CSI Cathedral Church - Kozhikode

The Church of South India (CSI) Cathedral Church is a landmark of Kozhikode City and a symbol of the contributions of the German missionaries of the Basel Mission in India.

It was on December 20, 1856, that the CSI Cathedral was opened. It marked a moment in the history of the Basel Mission in North Kerala after Hermann Gundert began activities of the mission in Thalassery on April 12, 1839. Located on the eastern side of the Mananchira Square, it is the biggest Basel Mission church in the Malabar region, built eight years after the missionaries came to India. The architecture is a combination of European and Kerala styles. On top of the arched entrance porch, there is a three-tiered turret. The church has a main hall and a cluster of rooms to the back and the sides. These are roofed with tiles.

The church also has a pipe organ which was a gift from the St. Ayden's Church in Cheltenham, England.

The pioneering founders of the CSI Cathedral Church were Reverend Dr. Hermann Gundert, Reverend Samuel Hebich and Reverend J.M. Fritz.

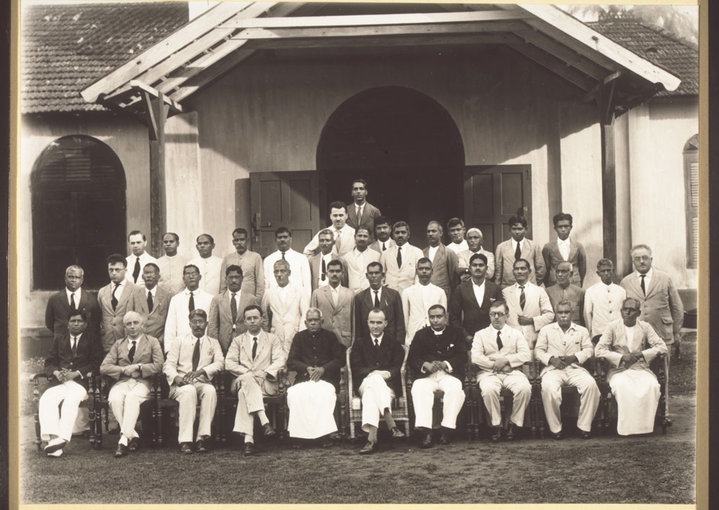
Malabar Church Council with Reverend Karl Hartenstein 1932

Reverend Dr. Hermann Gundert	Reverend J.M. Fritz	Reverend Samuel Hebich
Rt. Reverend Richard Lipp	Rt. Rev T.G. Stuart Smith	Reverend H. Knoblock

=== CSI St. Mary's English Church, Calicut ===
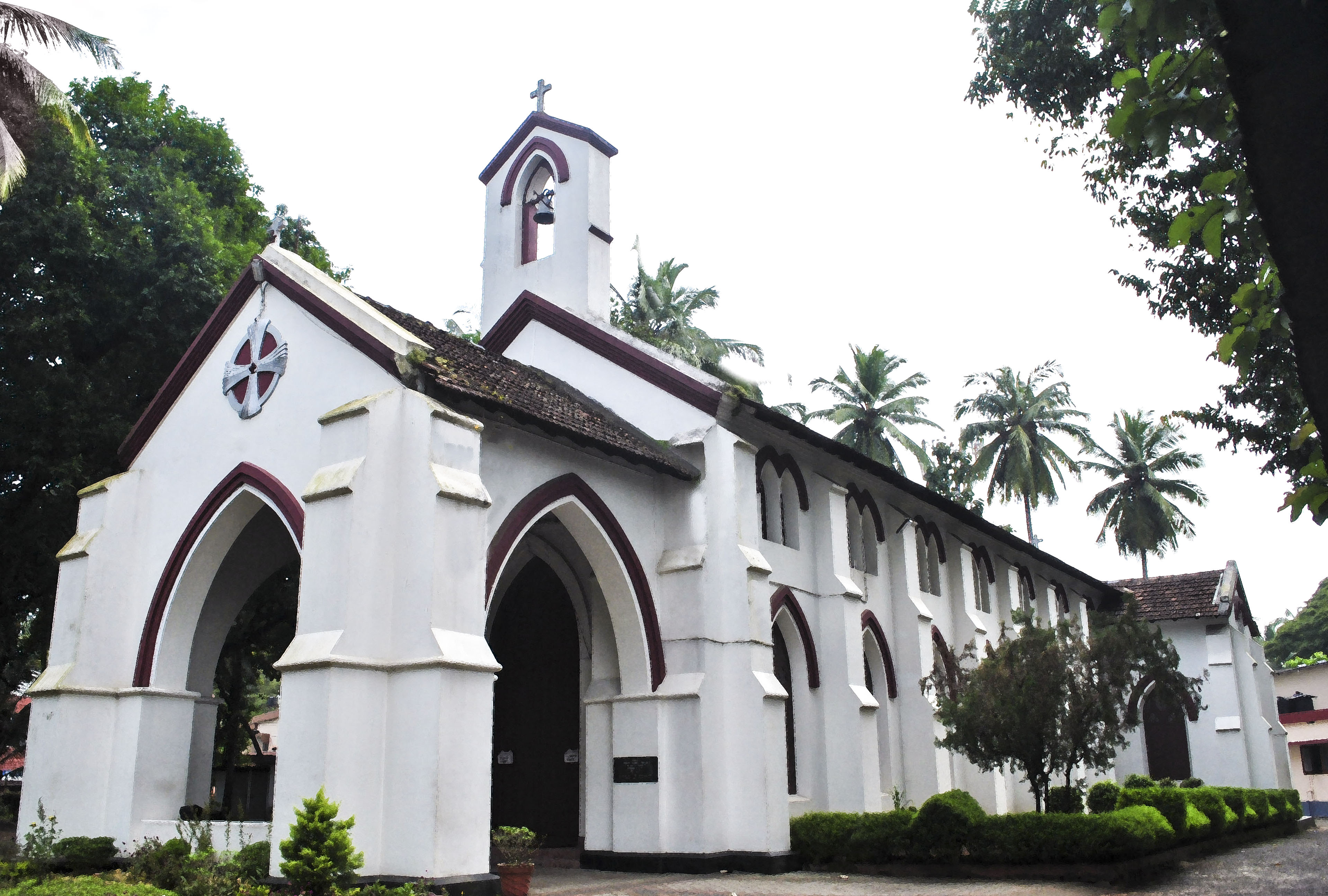
St.Mary's English Church

The CSI St. Mary's English Church was built by the British. The original plan of this church was drawn in Gothic design by the then British Chief Engineer Col. Faber. This plan was put aside due to a controversy that arose between the civil district administration and the British military. While the British military wanted the church built at their barracks, the British civil servants wanted it to be located at Civil Station. This controversy kept the project in abeyance until a new Chaplin, Rev. Mickee, was appointed in 1860. He effected a compromise deal by which a Church could be built at an equidistant location both from the military barracks and from the Civil Station. Thus ‘Nadakavu’ was chosen as the location. The District Engineer Cap. Beans R. E., drew a new plan and estimated the project cost to Rs.9085. Government promised a grant of Rs.4500, the Church Building Society contributed Rs.2000 and the local community contributed the rest.

The foundation stone for the new plan was laid on 8 June 1863 and the church was completed in September 1864. The church was consecrated by Bishop Gell on 28 September 1864 and dedicated to God's service and named in honour of the Blessed Virgin Mary. This church is unique in fostering its Anglican traditions. It is the only church in North Kerala Diocese which has an altar-piece. This altar-piece is a replica of one of the paintings by the Italian renaissance artist Raphael, named "Madonna del Granduca". The baptismal font of the church is carved out of a single solid block of blackwood (west coast Mahogany) by an unknown skilled local carpenter. The tie beam roof truss is all wooden and is a combination of collar-braces, queen- post truss, and distinct wooden arches of Oriental style (as found in the Persian Architecture of North Indian monuments). These arches make them unique among the British built churches in North Kerala Diocese.

In line with her Anglican traditions, candles are always lit during prayer Services and during Eucharistic Services. St. Mary's English Church is also the only church in North Kerala Diocese where Eucharistic Service is being conducted in English vernacular since its inception 150 years ago. Today, the church is active with cosmopolitan composition of members from more than 300 families. There are also two out-station CSI communities at Pathipara and Nooranthode which has churches under St. Mary's English Church Parish.

=== CSI Church of Hope, Melparamba ===
CSI Church of Hope, Melparamba, the architecturally marvellous Presbyterian church built in Gothic style Church in the Malabar diocese is situated in the Melparmaba area of the Palakkad town of the Kerala state of India which is accessible by road from Coimbatore city (50 km), Thrissur city (75 km) and Cochin city (130 km) and there are rail links also from these cities, the nearest station being the Palakkad junction railway station which is just 2 km away. The nearest airport is at Coimbatore city and there are Karippur airport (100 km) and Cochin international airport (100 km).

In 1889 February when the then Basel Mission Inspectors Mr. Eliar and Friedwork visited the Palakkad and its surroundings two requests were submitted to them by the natives- Build a weaving centre and a Tiles factory at Palakkad and Olavakkod respectivesly and buy Melparamba area. These requests were agreed upon by the Mission and bought Melparamba. and hence started the history of the Melparamba Church. For the newly converted Christians to reside 7 new houses were built. In 1892 a school was established and a house for the school master to reside was also built by Mr. Kinlay. In 1894 so many people were baptised and joined the church. In the early days of the church the Christians of the Melparamba had to travel to the Palakkad for worshipping. In 1894 end 47 people from other religions were baptised and joined to the church. The service for this was held in the thatched shed, the service comprised the baptism and a festival. In that function Mr. G.Kinlay, Mr. C. Holay, Mr. T. Huber from the west and Mr. Yohannan Amayangara, Mr. G. Peter, Mr. Thimothios vengadan, Mr. Charlie Hermon - all church workers participated. In 1897 the then worker of the Melparamba Rev. Thimothy Pongad undertook an analysis of the church's spiritual and worldly affairs and pointed out some short comings on the church affairs. After this, a night school was established for the teaching of Bible, Mr. Yoshuva jnarakkal master was appointed for this. As a result of this a spiritual revolution took place and church really started growing. In the 1900s when the space of the school could not accommodate the people due to their increased number Mr. Peter started the preliminary work for the establishment of the church. The tiles and bricks required for the church came from the Olavakkod tiles factory. The natives collected a sizable amount for the church building, but the main contribution came from the Australian people. In 1910 Mr. Frohn Mayer, the Basel mission inspector, came to visit the churches of the Malabar, the base stone was laid by him. In 1911 the church consecration was done. The church was built spaciously and beautifully. Since the obstacles to this church were overcome in the hope of Jesus Christ Mr. Peter gave the name "Church of Hope". After this the church became an independent church on its own away from the Palakkad church's control.

== Educational institutions ==
- Malabar Christian College (MCC) was founded by the Basel Evangelical Mission in 1909.

The college is situated at Kozhikode and it is an institution of learning in the North Malabar region.

- Christian Miller Arts and Science College (CMASC)

== See also ==
- Church of South India
- Madhya Kerala Diocese
- South Kerala Diocese
- East Kerala Diocese
- Church of North India
- Christianity in Kerala

== Gallery ==
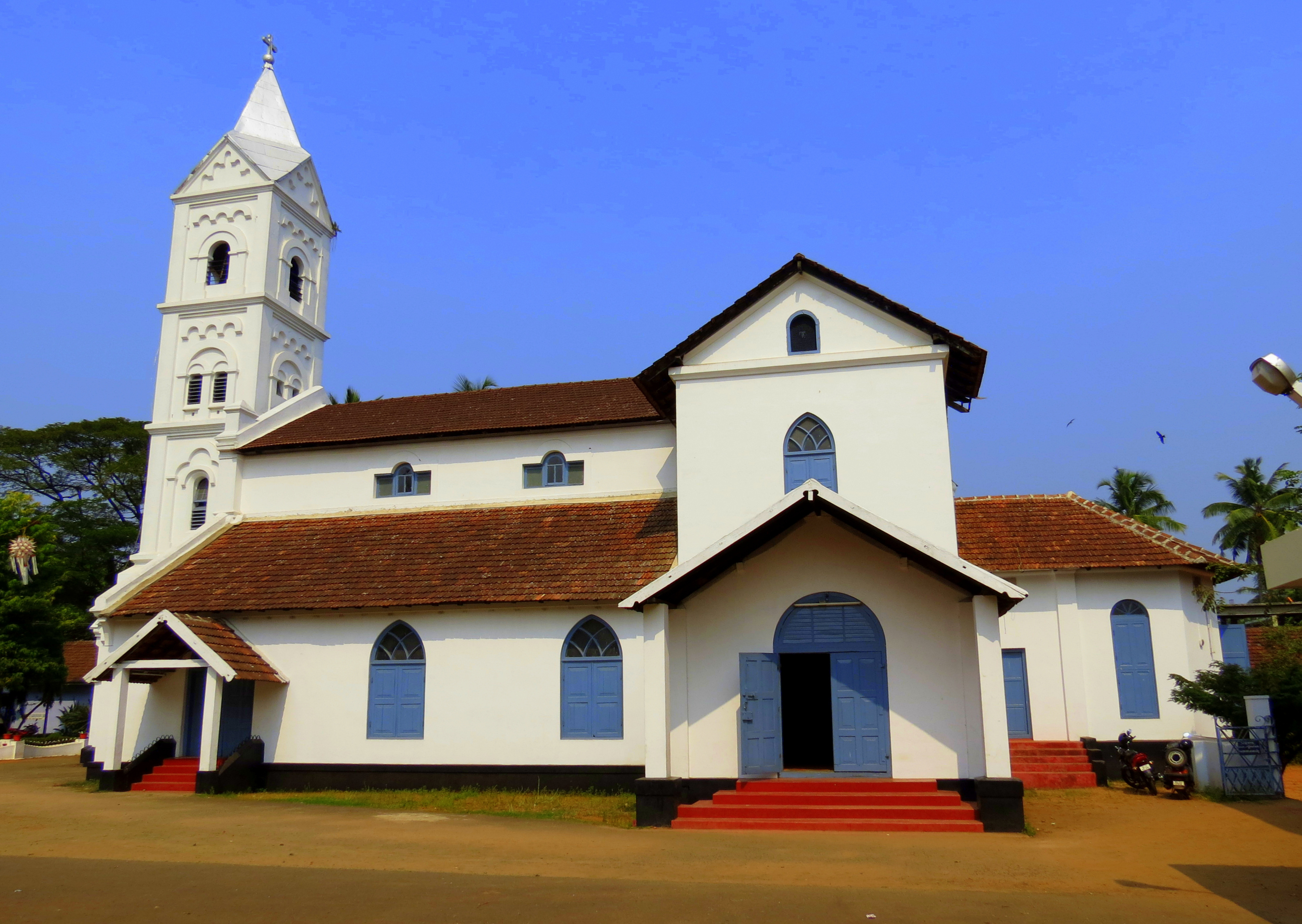
Side View of the CSI Cathedral Church, Calicut

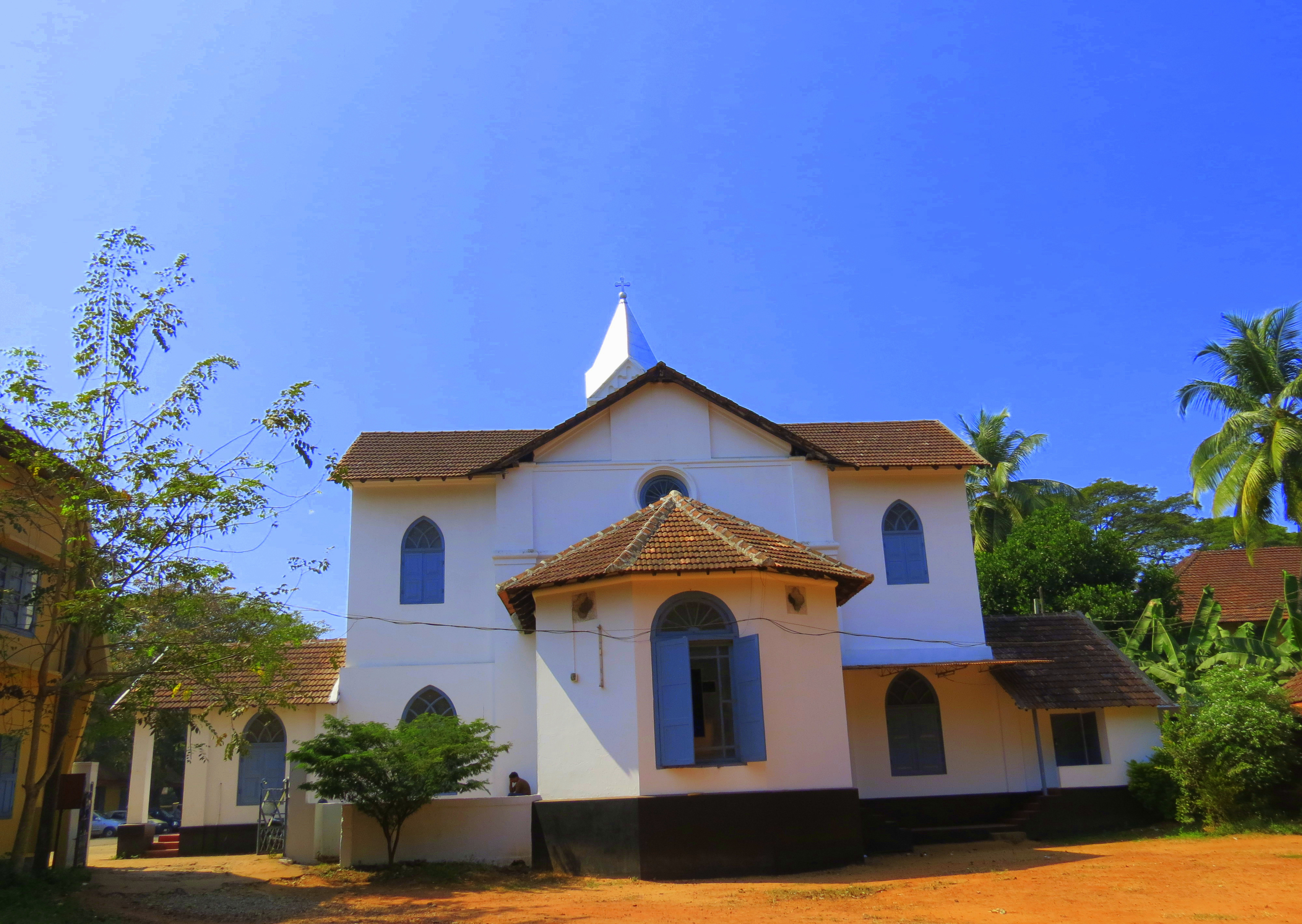
CSI Cathedral Rear View

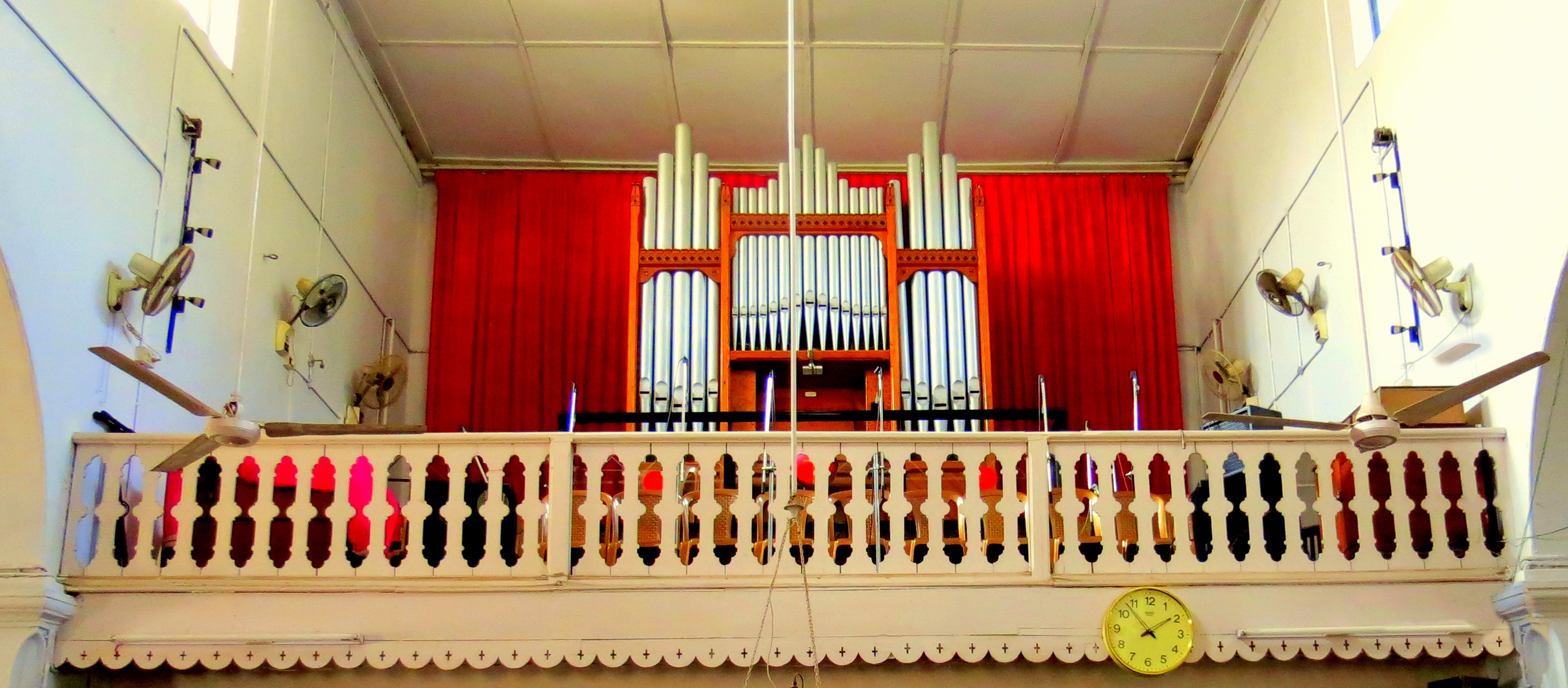
The CSI Cathedral Pipe Organ

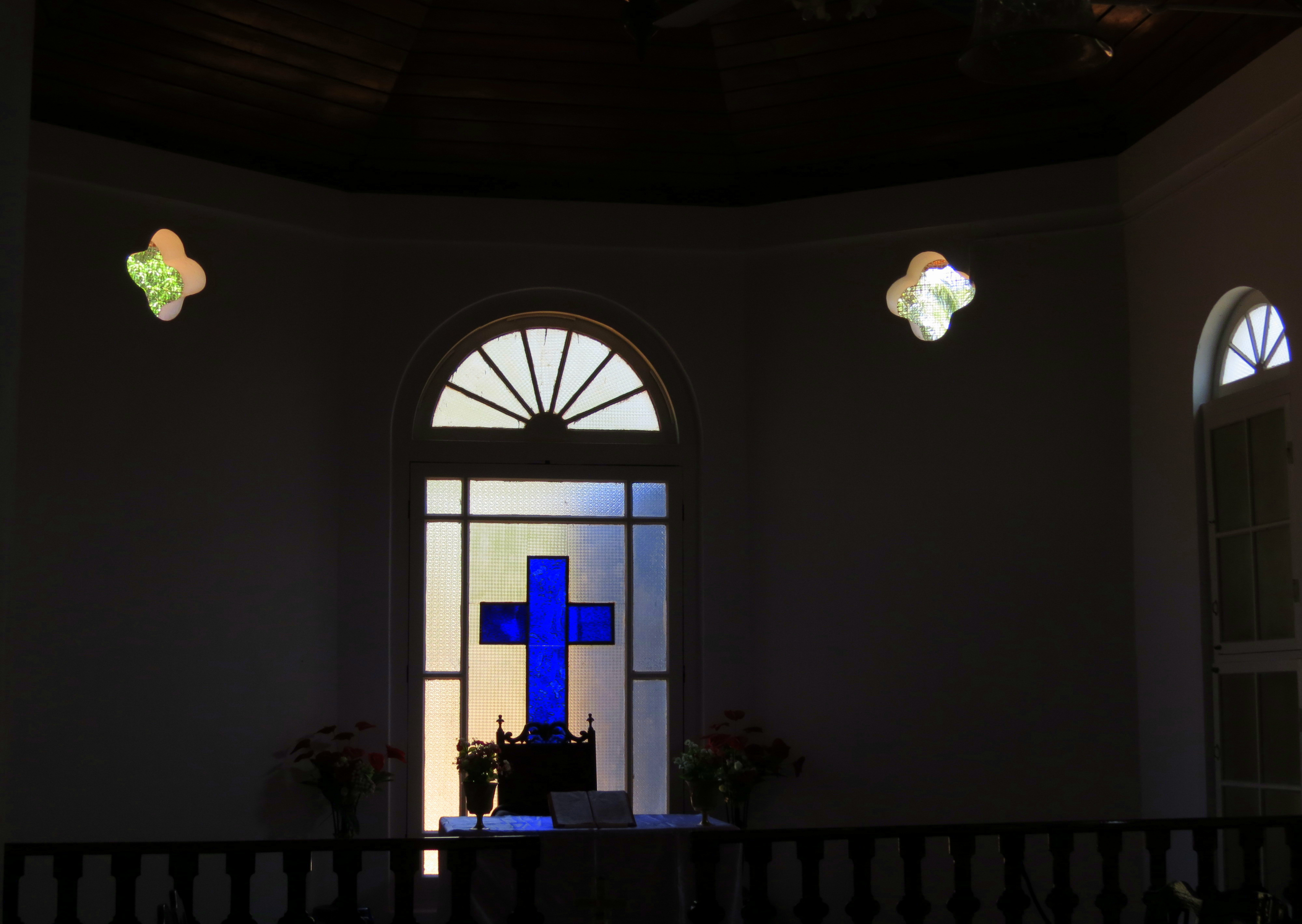
The Altar within the Church

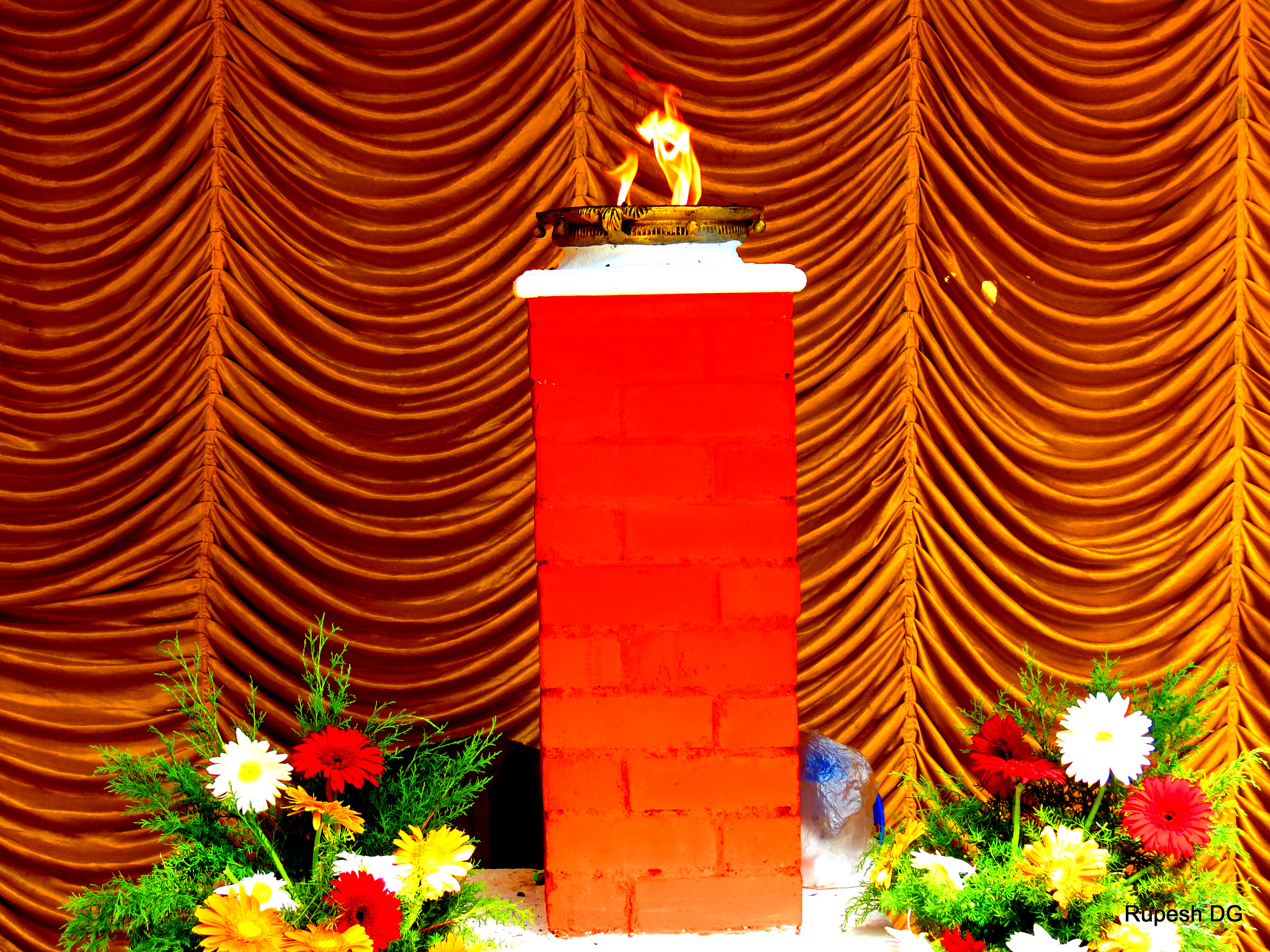
The Bicentennial Torch

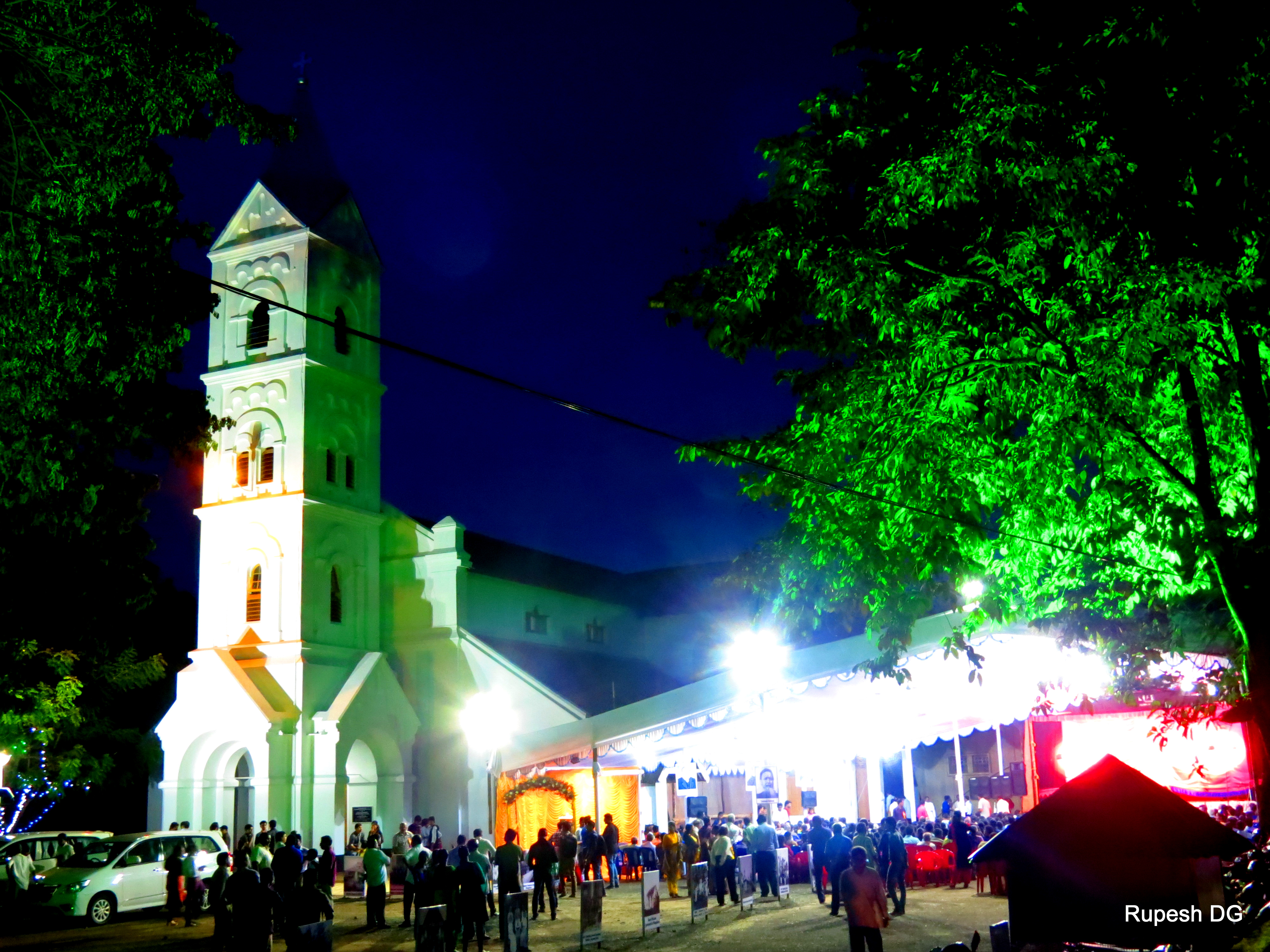
The Bicentennial Celebrations

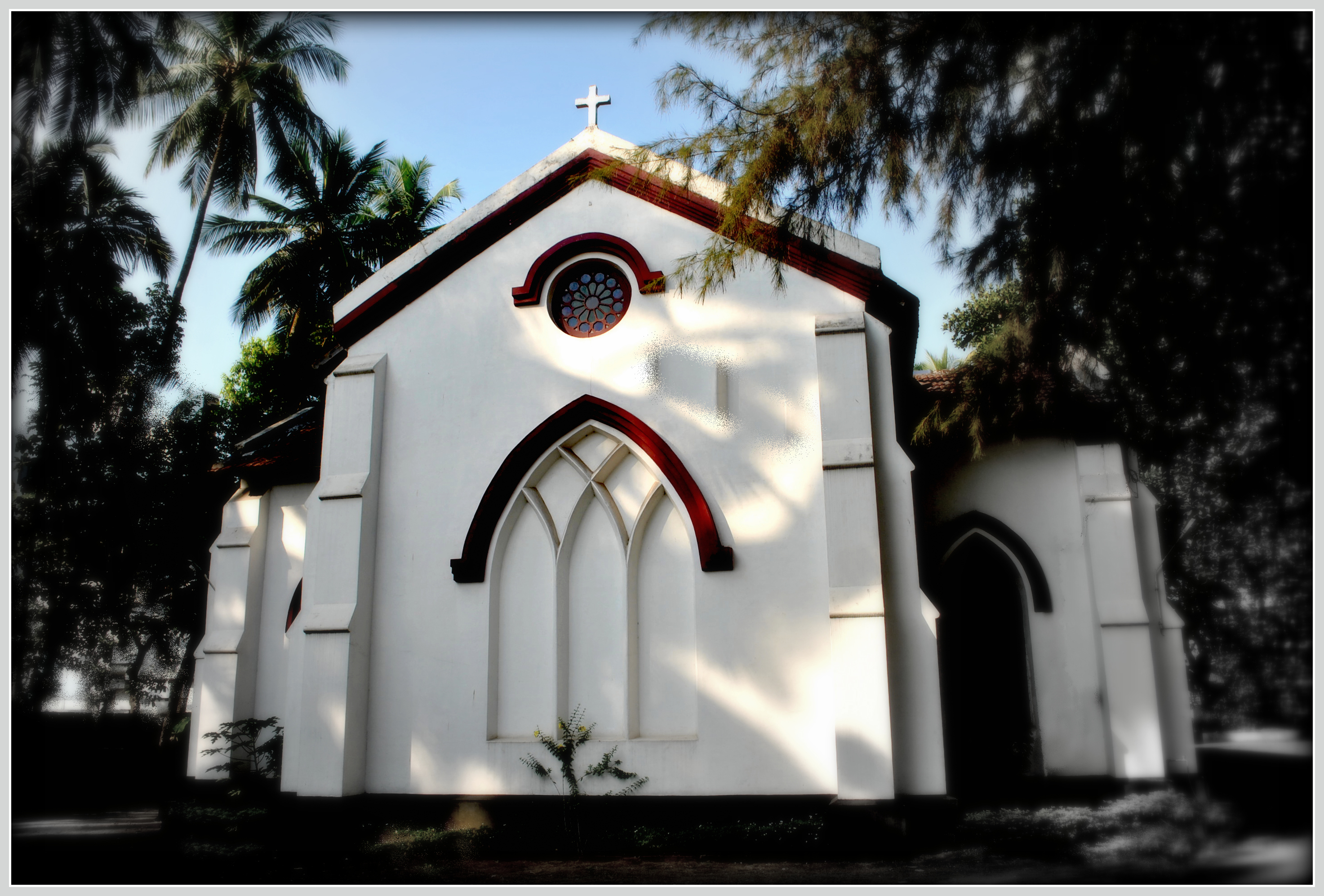
Side view of St.Mary's English Church

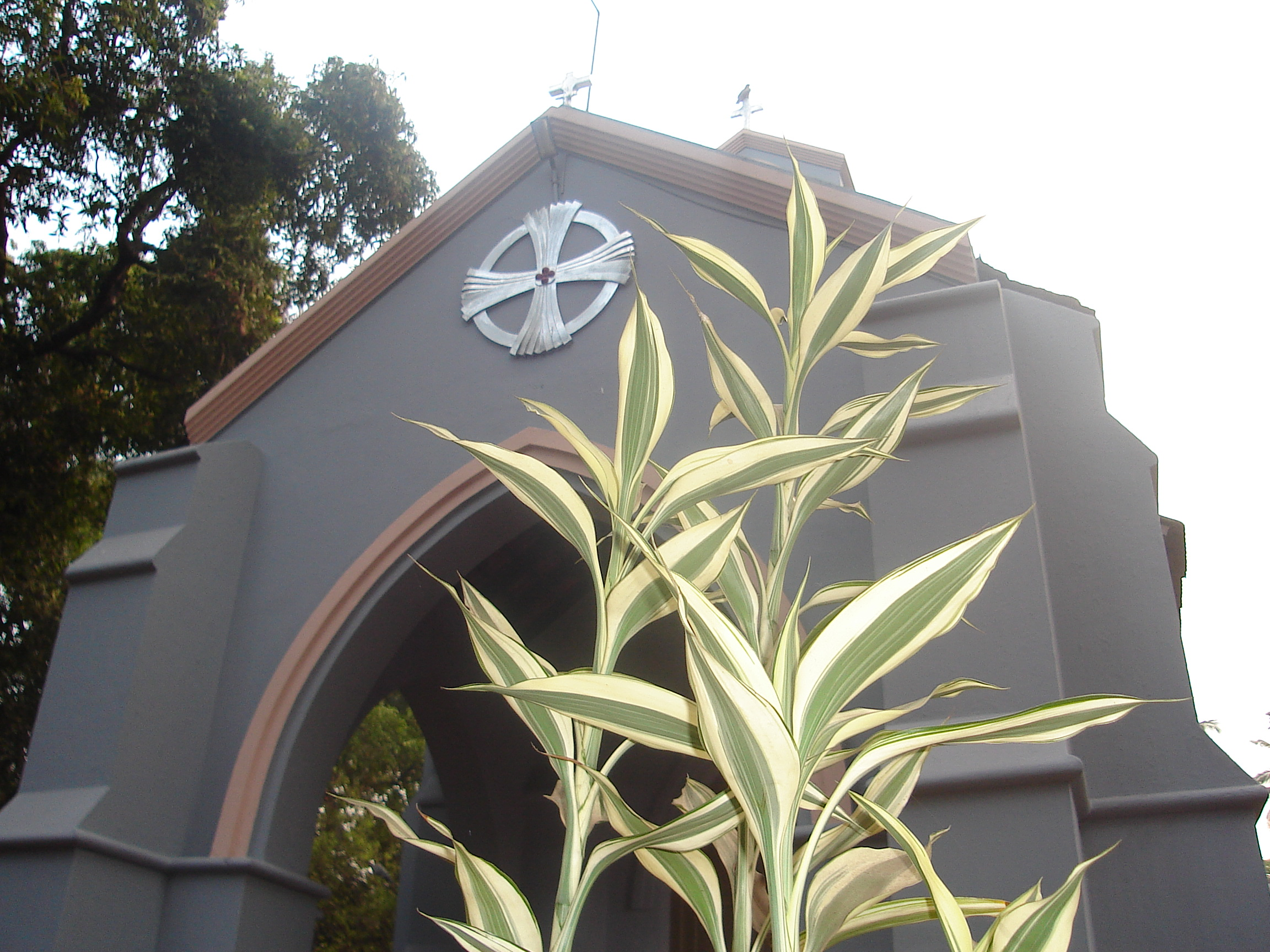
Side view of St.Mary's English Church

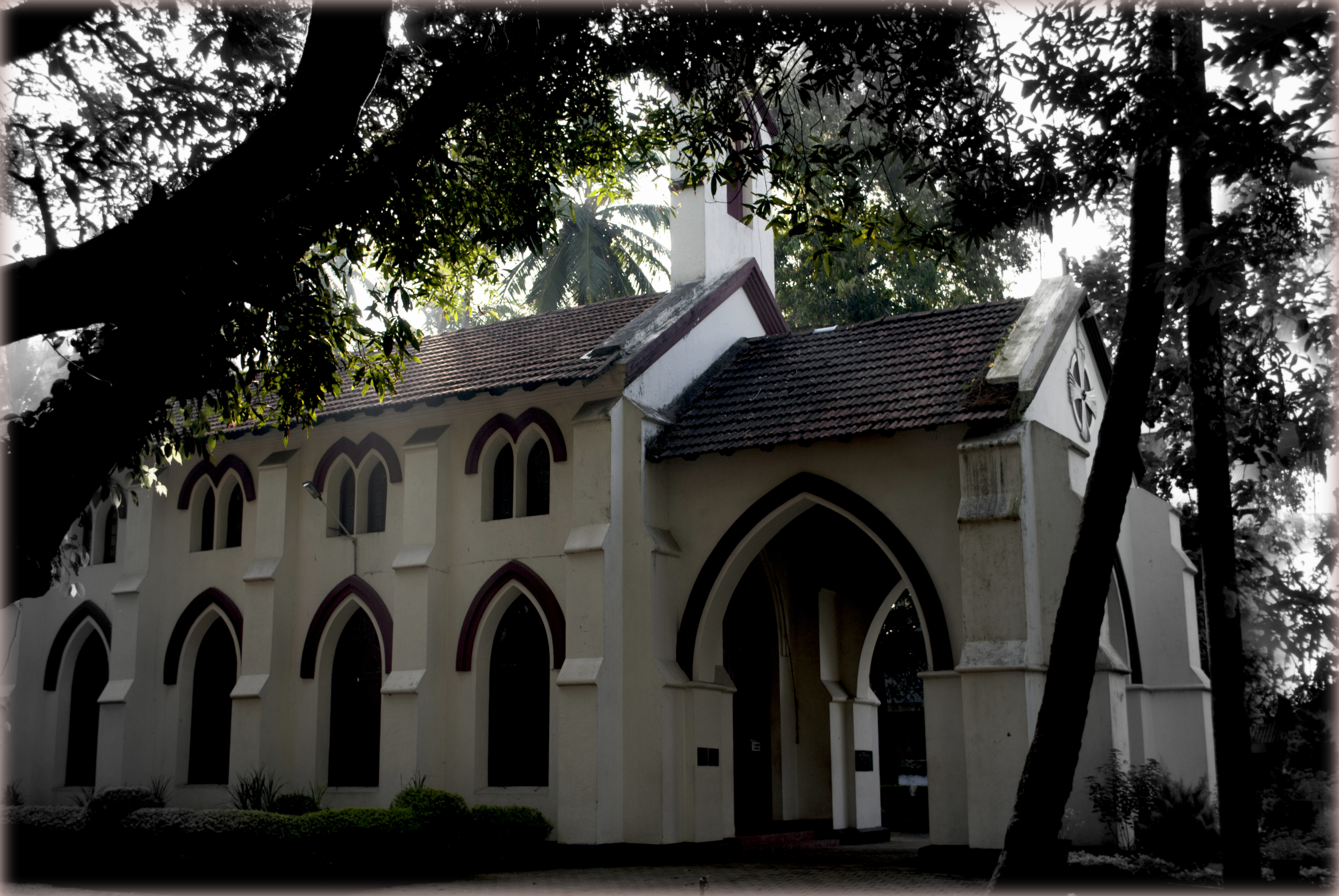
Side View of St.Mary's English Church

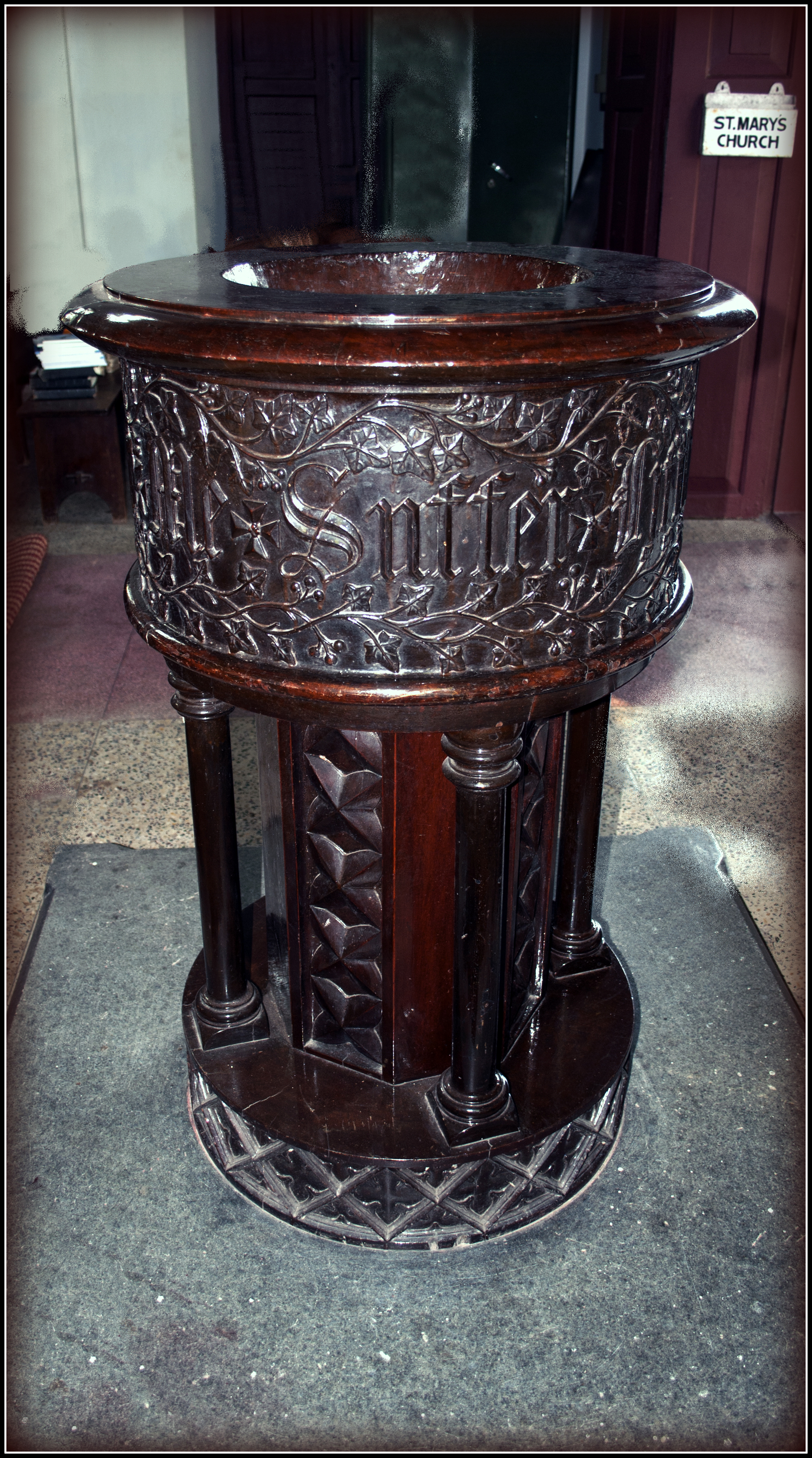
Baptismal Font of the Church

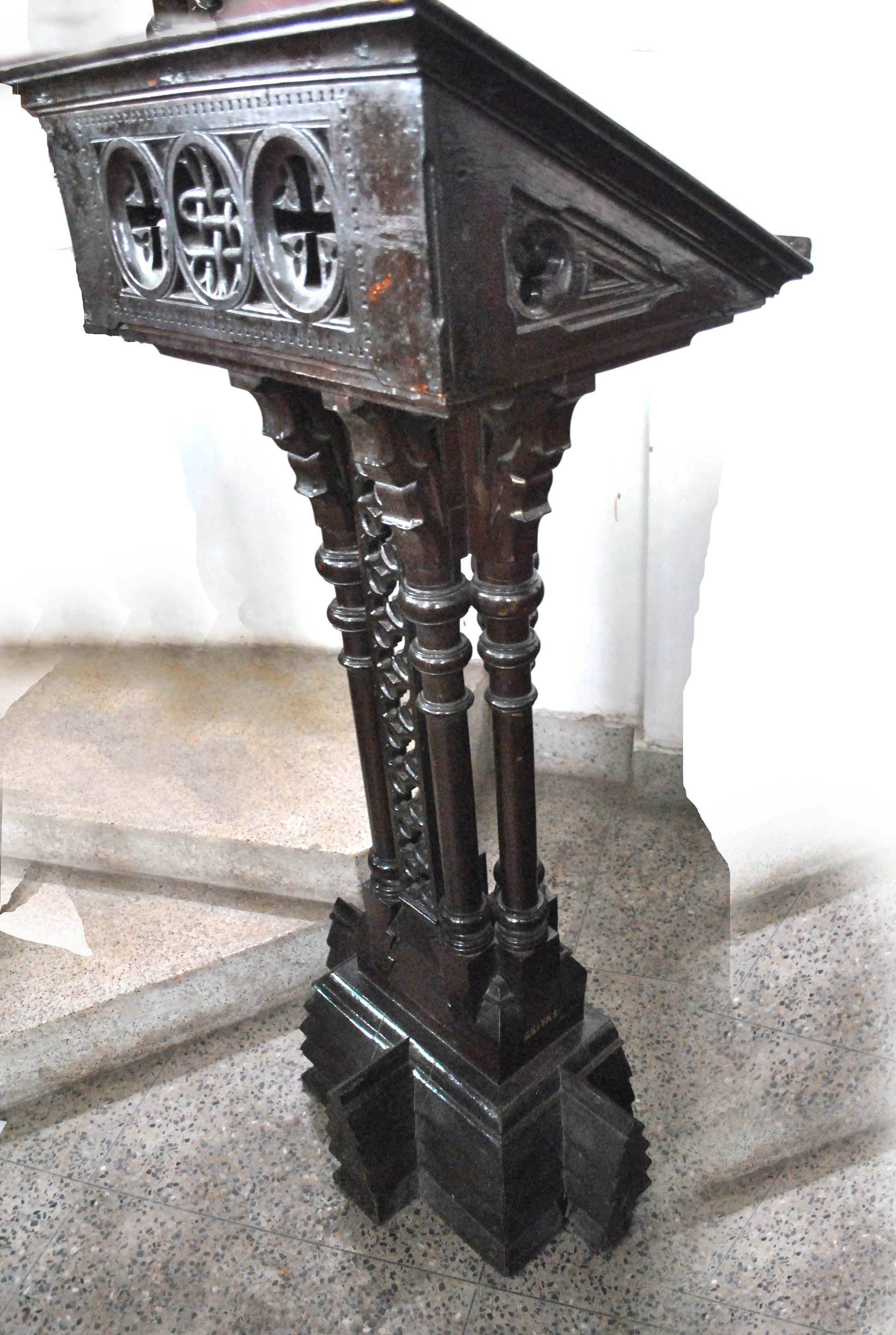
The Lectern of St. Mary's Church is richly carved in wood.

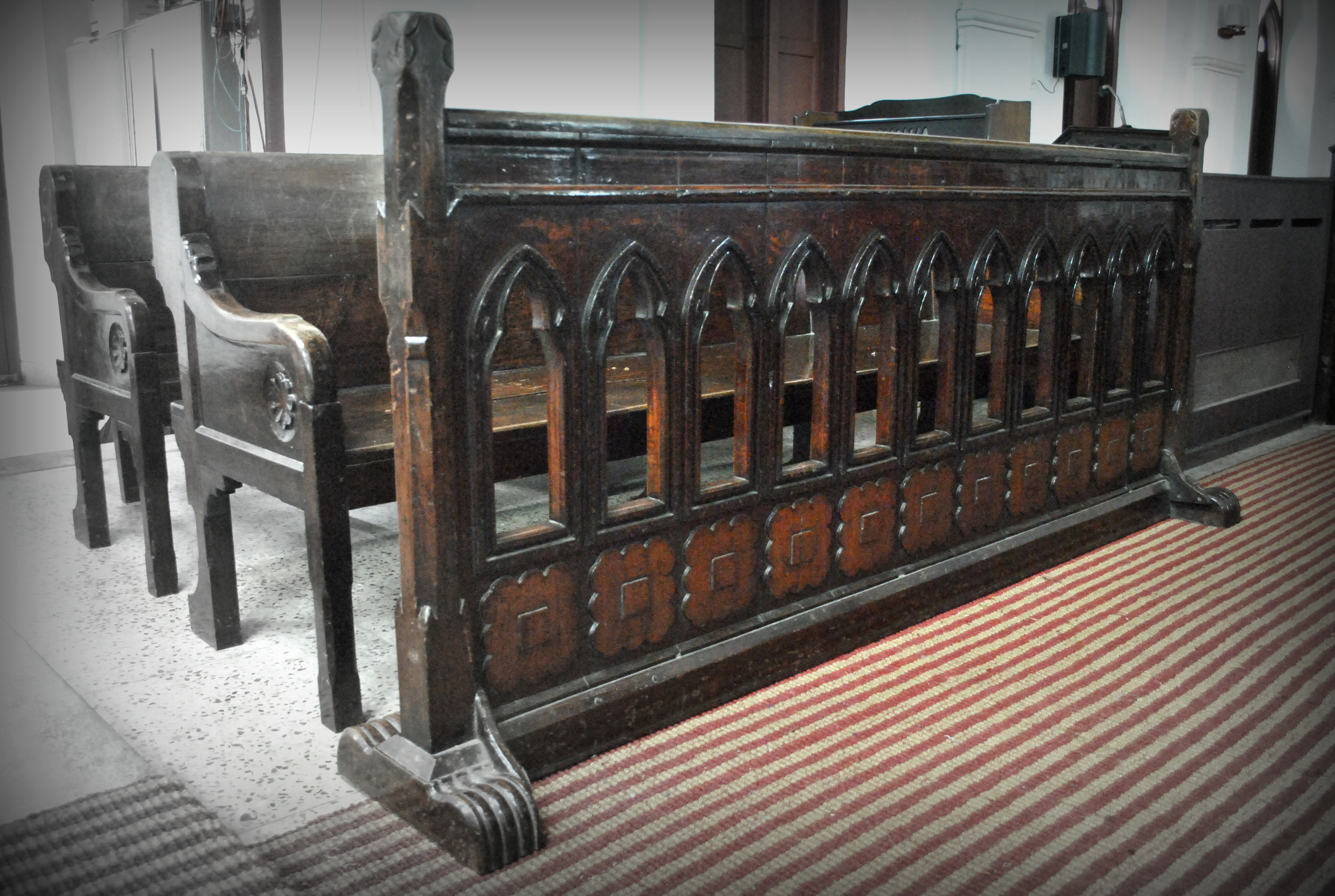
The Choir Stalls of St. Mary's Church

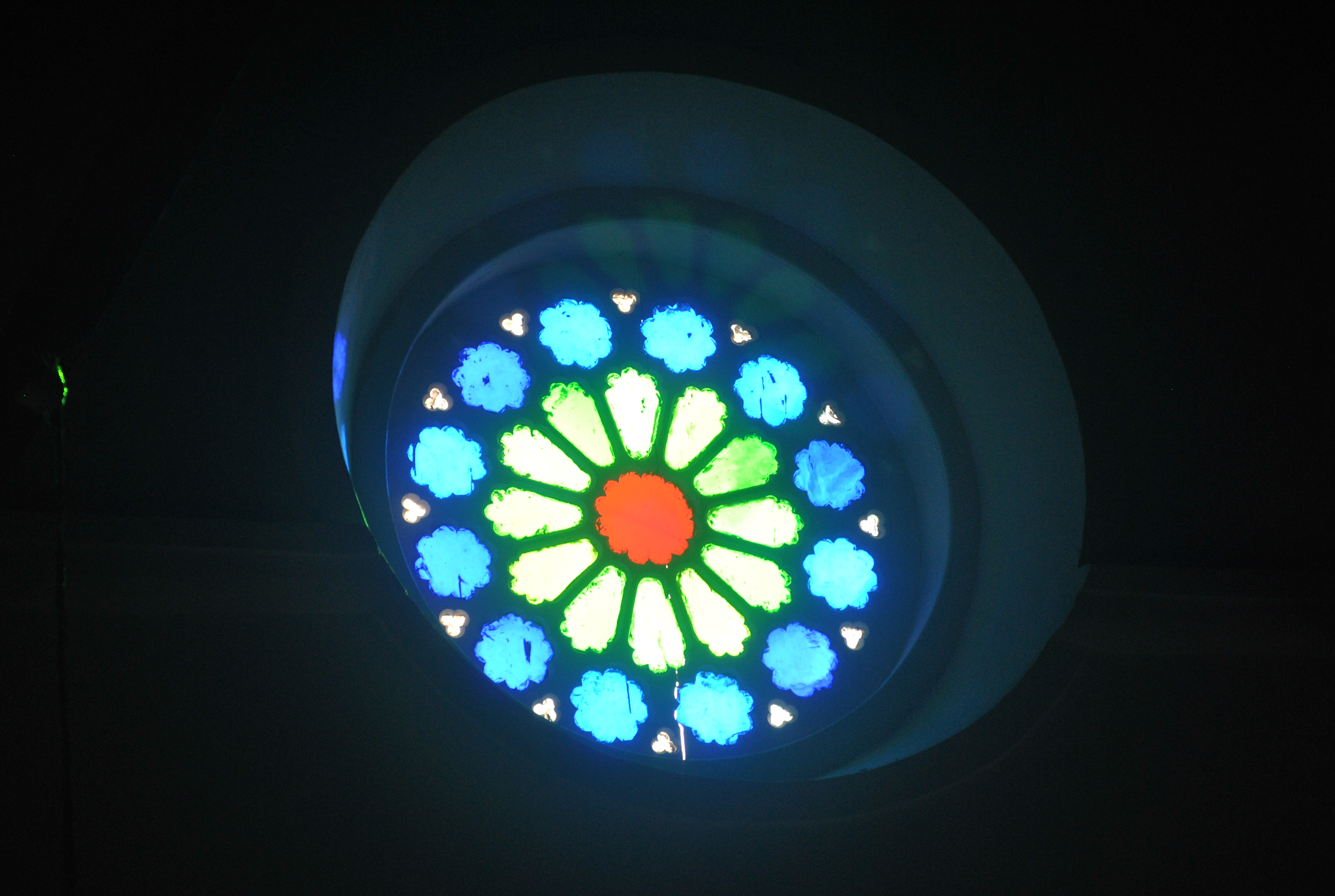
This is the stained-glass Rose Window of the St. Mary's Church at the Eastern end, above the altar.

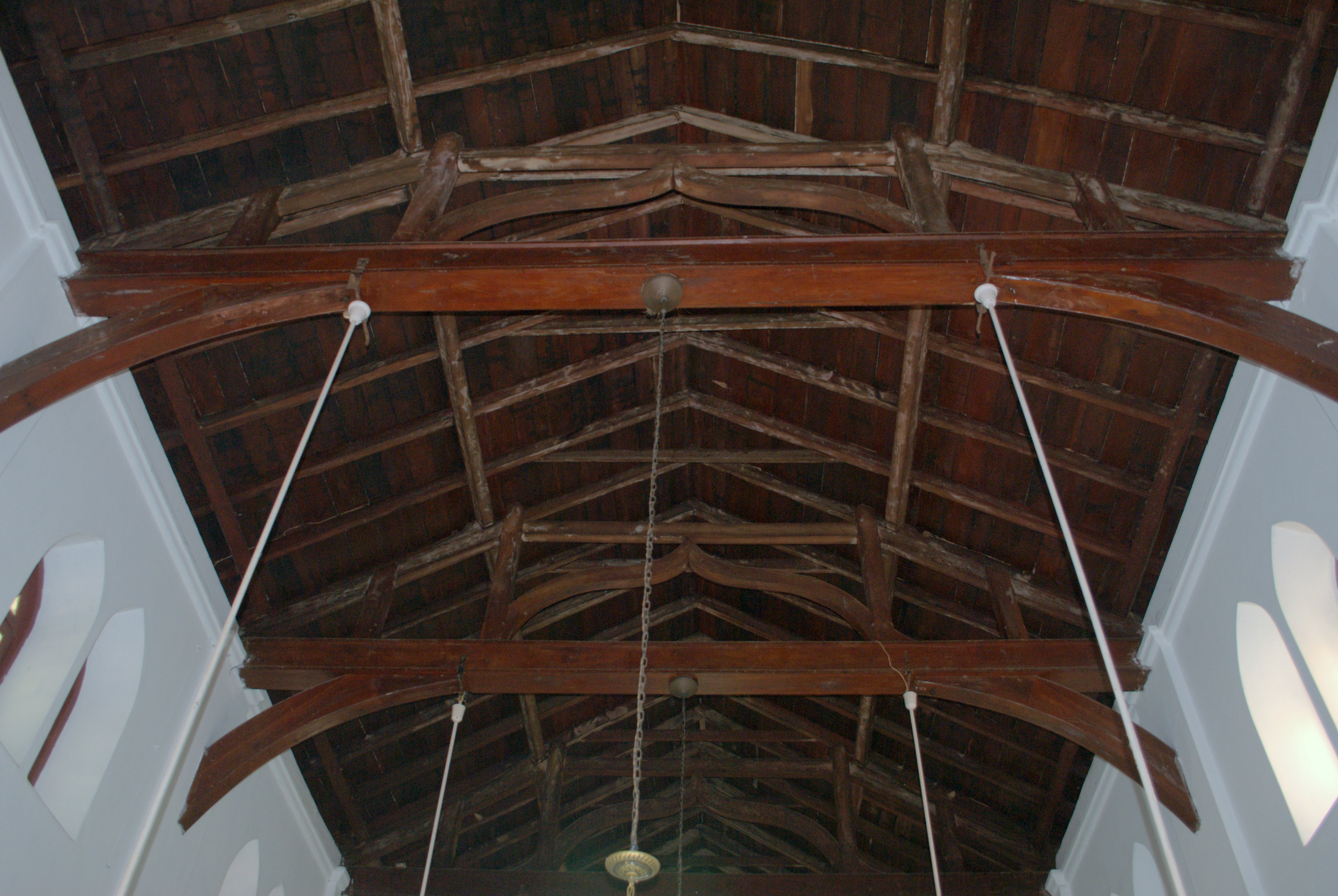
The all wooden truss work of the St. Mary's Church roof.

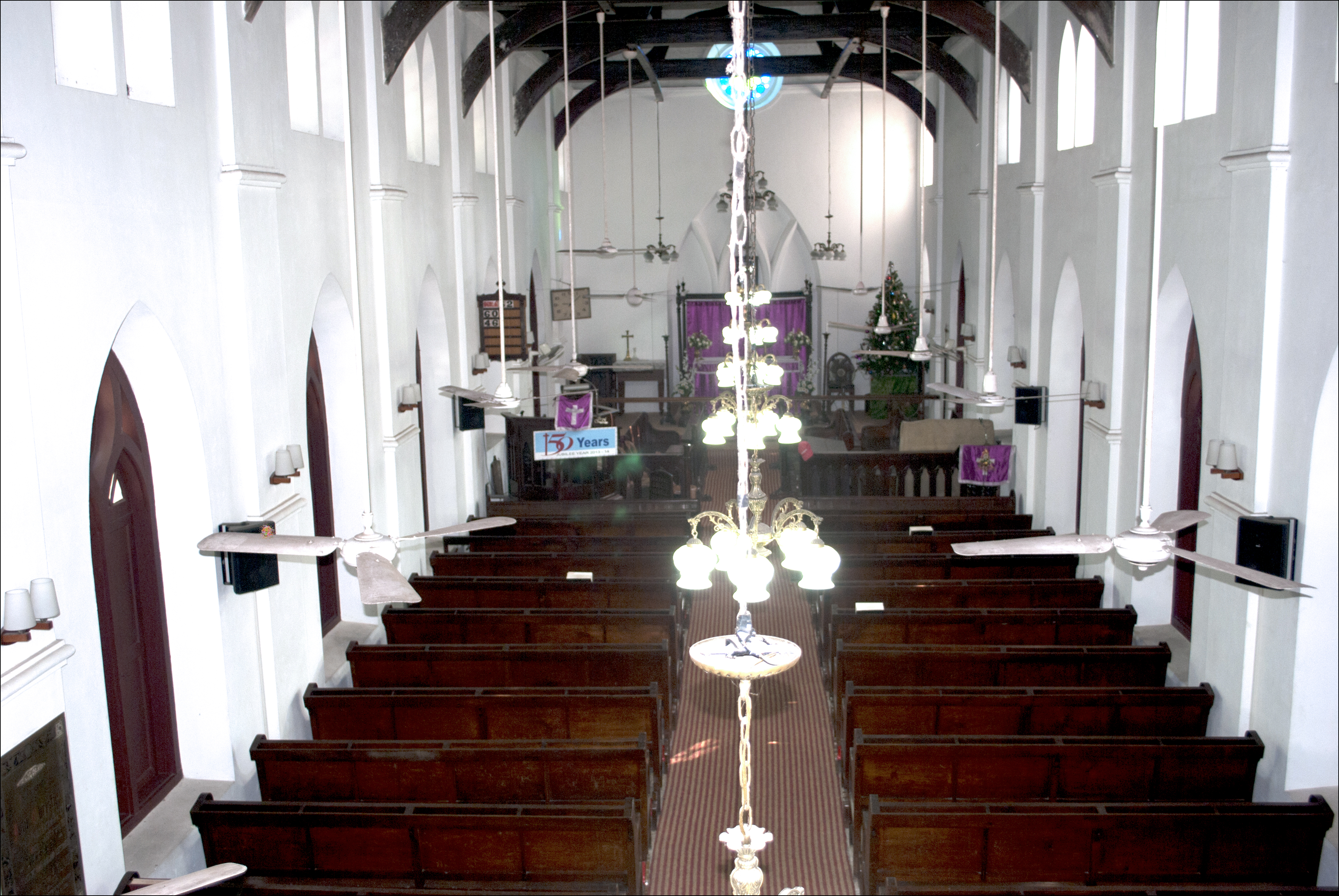
An elevated view of the St. Mary's English Church interior
