= Chekkulam =

- town
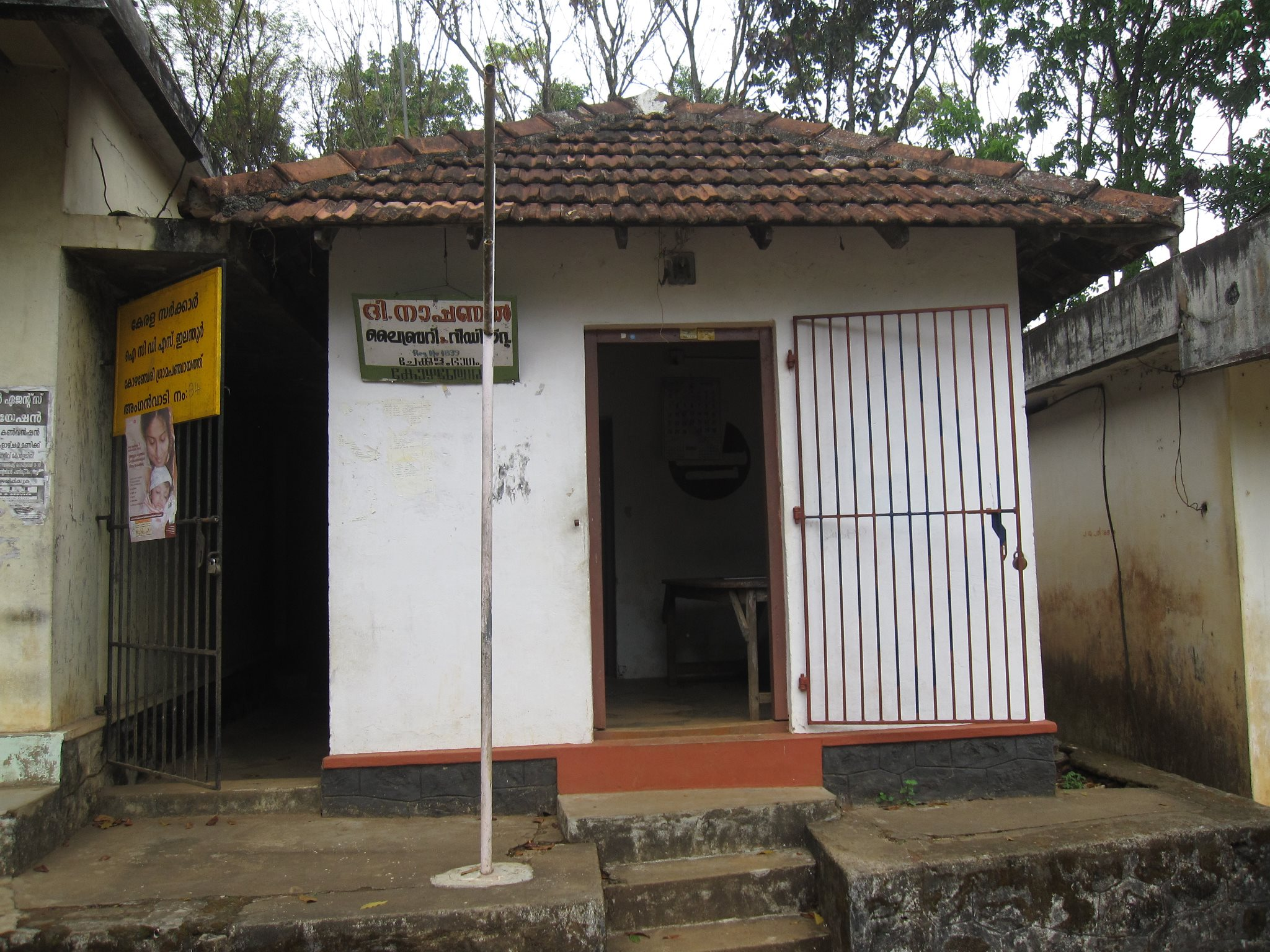
- The National Library
- Interactive map of Chekkulam
- Coordinates: 9°19′0″N 76°43′0″E
- Country: India
- State: Kerala
- District: Pathanamthitta

Languages
  - Official: Malayalam, English
- Time zone: UTC+5:30 (IST)
- PIN: 689654
- Telephone code: 0468
- Vehicle registration: KL-
- Literacy: 100%%

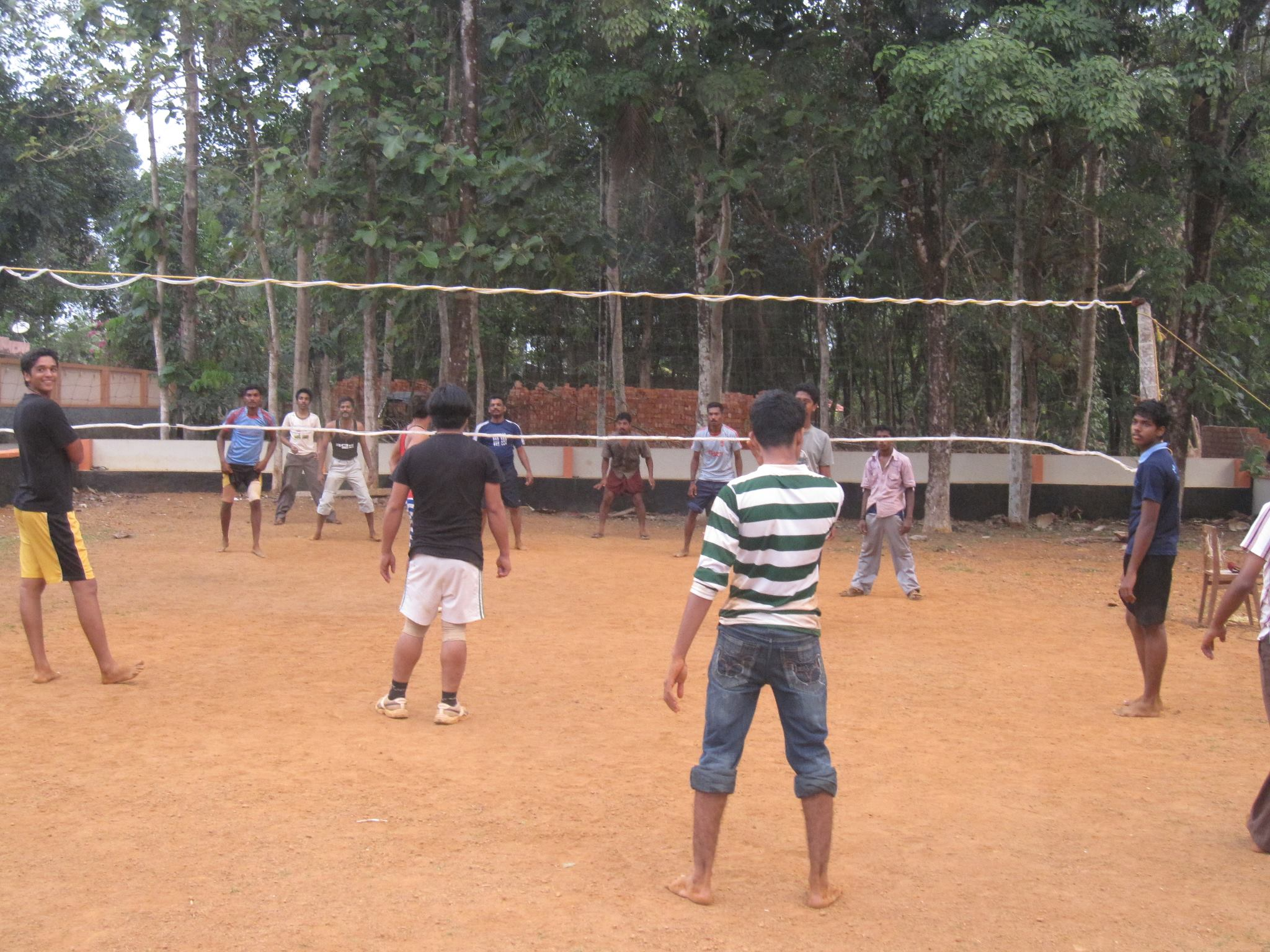
Playground

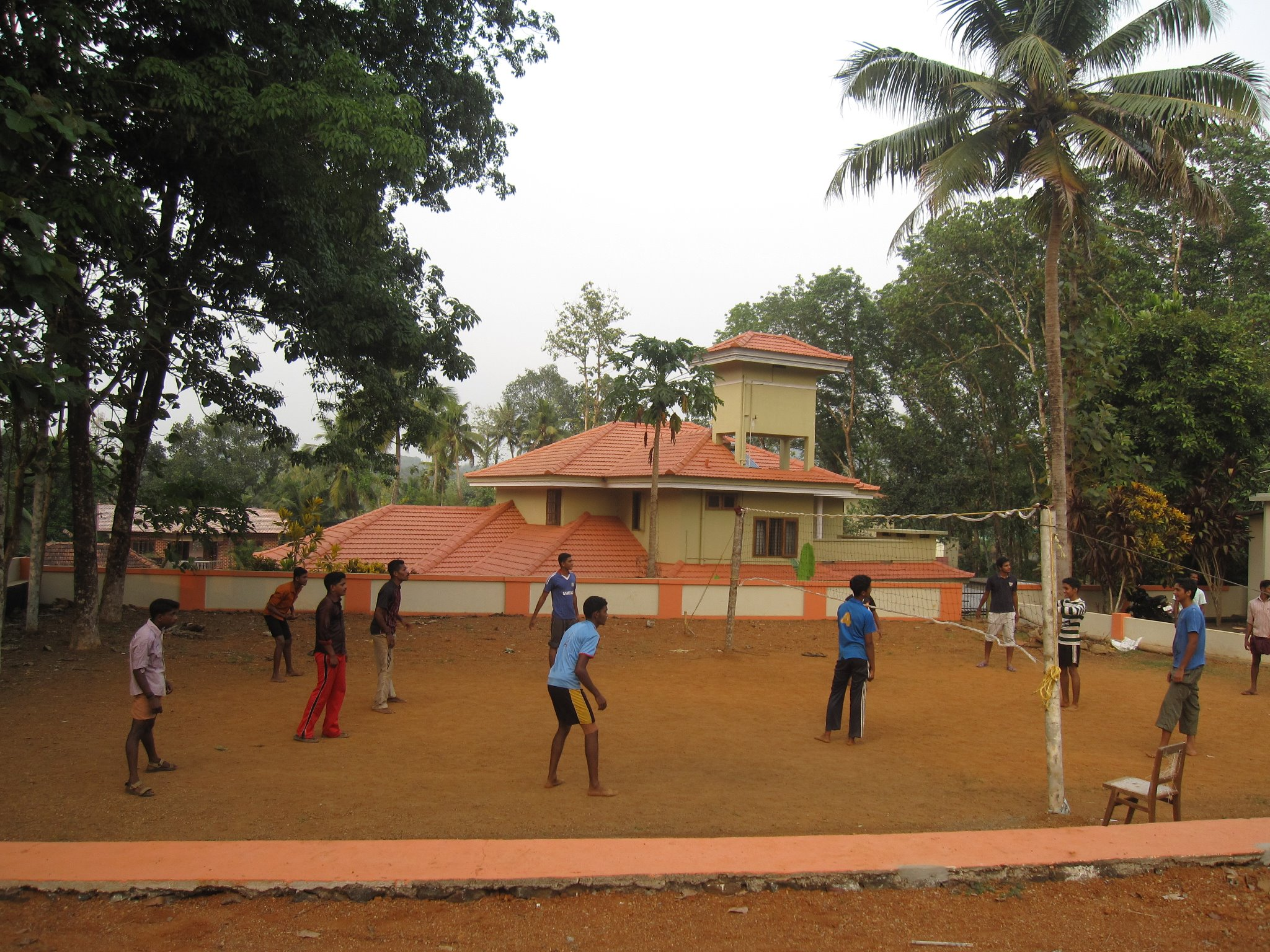
Children of Chekkulam

Chekkulam is a small place in Kozhencherry, Pathanamthitta District, Kerala State, India.

== Geography ==
Chekkulam is situated about 2.5 km from Kozhencherry. At the Chekkulam junction, there are multiple and one public library.

== Community life ==
There is a library calls 'The National Library & Reading Room'. In associate with this library there is a National Arts and Sports club in

== Religion ==
The two major religions of Chekkulam are Christianity and Hinduism. The largest sect of Christianity are the Marthomites. A small church is the branch of the main Church, St.Thomas Mar Thoma Church, Kozhencherry. About 50 families constitute the congregation.
