= Samuel Hebich =

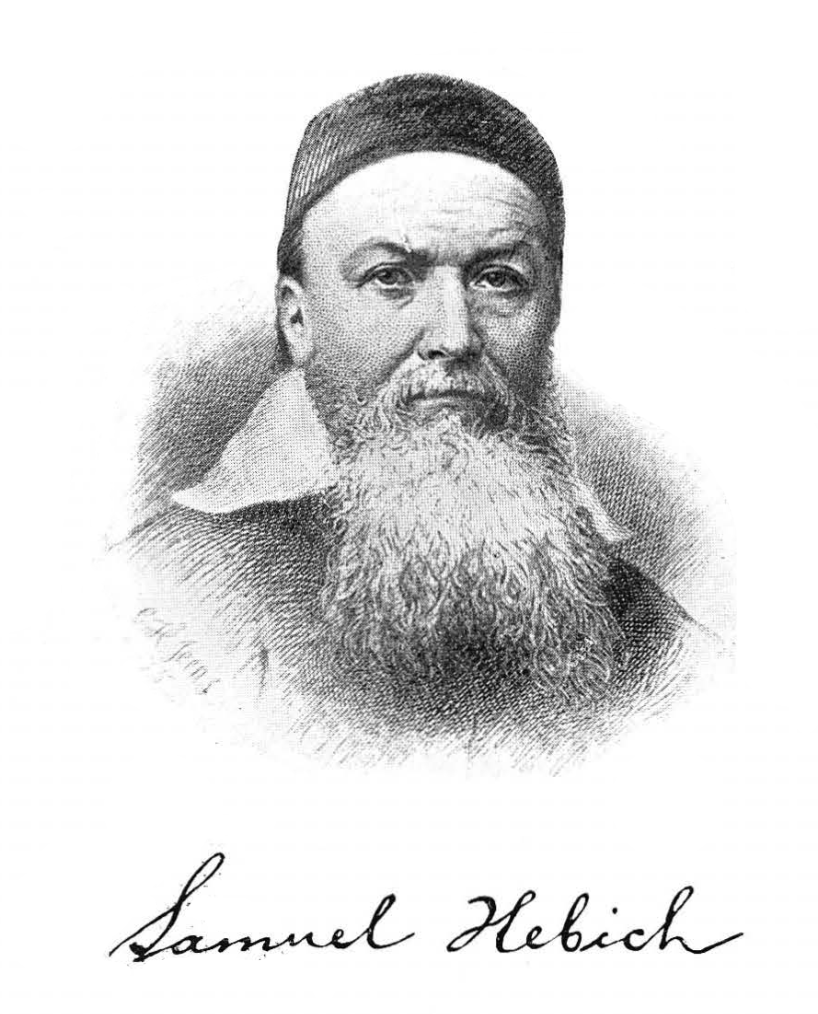

Samuel Hebich (1803–1868) was one of the three pioneer Basel Mission missionaries to Southwestern India–Canara, Coorg, South Mahratta, Malabar, and Nilagiri. He, along with Johann Christoph Lehner and Christian Leonard Greiner commenced Basel Mission station, the first German mission station in India, at Mangalore.

== Biography ==
He was born near Ulm, Württemberg in Germany to a pastor. In 1834, he was one of the first three missionaries send by Basel Mission for missionary service in Southwestern India. He and other missionaries sailed to Malabar Coast boarding the ship "Malabar" on 15 July 1834, and they reached Kozhikode, also known as Calicut, on 14 October 1834. They were warmly received by Nelson, a British judge in Calicut. On hearing their mission to go Mangalore, Nelson wrote to his friend Findley Anderson, a Sub-collector of Mangalore, asking him to do all he could to help them. They finally arrived at Bokkapattana in Mangalore on 30 October 1834. With the help of Anderson, a house was bought from a Parsee for 4,900 rupees in Mangalore, that ultimately became the base for first German Basel Mission station in India.

=== Missionary work ===
The missionaries soon acquired the local tongues like Kannada, Konkani, Tulu, and Malayalam; later, they engaged themselves in their missionary activities like preaching, constructing prayer halls, and converting British and Indian soldiers, including natives to Christianity with the help of British officials of East India Company. Samuel Hebich was exceptionally successful in the conversion of young British officers, in spite of his autocratic inclination made him a difficult person to work with.

Samuel established the mission stations at Mangalore and Cannanore, a unique Christian community base composed of British and Indian soldiers. By the middle of the 19th century, the mission had grown with stations expanded to Belma in 1845, Mulki in 1845, Udupi in 1854, and Santhoor in 1865. Basel missionaries received substantial assistance from several British officials and planters, also continued after Indian subcontinent officially became part of British Raj.

==== Education mission ====
The objectives of the commission[board] that sent first three missionaries to Southwestern India was to establish schools and institutions to train future catechists. The mission education was considered important; hence, wherever there was to be a congregation, the mission had decided to have an elementary Christian teacher. Besides elementary education, they began training people to be catechists as early as 1840.

==== Agriculture mission ====
The field experience soon made the missionaries that they needed to involve themselves in creating some remunerative jobs rather than just educating people. The missionaries also felt that the best way to fellowship with the converts was to keep them busy in some productive work. When the government of East India Company presented some piece of land to Samuel Hebich, he tried coffee plantation, however, he gave up as it didn't prove that successful. They also made an attempt to make sugar out of toddy, which proved too expensive because of the huge fuel costs.

The missionaries then thought of farming as many of the missionaries came from farming families; accordingly, the mission bought some land for agriculture and gave it on lease for cultivation. As very few took interest in cultivating the lands as their own, the agriculture settlements proved a partial failure, eventually to be discarded in 1880.

==== Industrial mission ====
After the failure of Agriculture mission, the missionaries conceived of an Industrial establishment as an alternative for creating some remunerative jobs; accordingly, in 1846, the missionaries launched an Industrial school in Mangalore to train people in Weaving, Carpentry, Clock Making, and alike. In 1854, Watch and Clock making was given up as it was found not suitable to the requirements and capacity of the people.

Printing press with book binding department, another Industrial undertaking by missionaries, proved to be successful. After the Printing press started in 1841 at Mangalore, first Lithograph and later Kannada types[fonts] were introduced. In 1851, a printer with Kannada fonts came from the Basel for the press at Mangalore. The press printed Christian books and books related to Literature, Science, and The arts providing employment to several souls.

After twenty-six years of missionary service, he returned to Germany in 1866 with failing health, and died in 1868.

==== Criticism ====
His oversimplified preaching and evangelism against Hindu paganism aroused considerable criticism in India and Europe, especially from E. F. Langhans, a Swiss theologian. However, his twenty-five years of missionary service laid a solid foundation on which Indian church could be built.
