= Church of South India =

United Protestant church in South India

- Logo of the Church of South India
- Abbreviation: CSI
- Classification: Protestant
- Orientation: United and uniting
- Polity: Mixed polity with episcopal, congregational, and presbyterian elements
- Moderator: The Most Rev. K. Reuben Mark
- Deputy Moderator: The Rt. Rev. V. S. Francis
- General Secretary: Adv. C. Fernandas Rathina Raja
- Hon. Treasurer: B. Vimal Sukumar
- Distinct fellowships: Christian Conference of Asia, National Council of Churches in India, Communion of Churches in India
- Associations: Anglican Communion, World Methodist Council, World Council of Churches, World Communion of Reformed Churches
- Region: Andhra Pradesh, Karnataka, Kerala, Tamil Nadu, Puducherry, Telangana and Sri Lanka
- Origin: 27 September 1947 (Day of Union, not date of establishment); Tranquebar, Tamil Nadu (Presently Under the Pastorate of Karaikal - Tranquebar, Tiruchirappalli - Thanjavur Diocese)
- Merger of: Church of India, Burma and Ceylon (Anglican), the southern district of the Methodist Church, South India United Church (which was a union in 1904 of the Continental Reformed, Presbyterian and Congregational Churches), Basel Mission Churches in South India
- Separations: Anglican Church of India (1964); Anglican Catholic Church (1984)
- Congregations: 14,000
- Members: 4,500,000 - 5,000,000
- Ministers: 3,300
- Hospitals: 104
- Secondary schools: 2000 schools, 130 colleges
- Official website: www.csi1947.com

The Church of South India (CSI) is a united Protestant Church in India. It is the result of union of a number of Protestant denominations in South India that occurred after the independence of India. With a membership of over 4.5 million - 5 million, it is the second-largest Christian church in India, based on the number of members.

The Church of South India is the successor of a number of Protestant denominations in India, including the four southern dioceses of the Church of India, Burma and Ceylon (Anglican), the South India United Church (Congregationalist, Presbyterian and Continental Reformed), and the southern district of the Methodist Church.

The Church of South India is a member of the Anglican Communion, World Methodist Council and World Communion of Reformed Churches. It is one of four united Protestant churches in the Anglican Communion, World Methodist Council and World Communion of Reformed Churches, with the others being the Church of North India, the Church of Pakistan, and the Church of Bangladesh.

Being a United Protestant denomination, the inspiration for the Church of South India came from ecumenism and the words of Jesus as recorded in the Gospel of John (17.21); as such "That they all may be one" is the motto of the Church of South India.

== History ==
=== Origins ===
Four different church traditions were brought together in the CSI: Anglican, Congregational, Presbyterian, and Methodist. All these churches had been established in India through the missionary work of churches in Europe, America, and Australia, which had started their work in India at different periods from the beginning of the 18th century.

The Church of South India Scheme was the first practical attempt of its kind toward a union, on the basis of the following points enunciated in the Chicago-Lambeth Quadrilateral:

- The Holy Scripture of the Old and the New Testaments as containing all things necessary to salvation and as being the rule and ultimate standard of faith.
- The Apostles' Creed as the Baptismal Symbol and the Nicene Creed as sufficient statement of the Christian faith.
- The two sacraments, ordained by Christ Himself — Baptism and the Supper of the Lord — ministered with the unfailing use of Christ's words of Institution and elements ordained by Him.
- The Historic Episcopate, locally adapted in the methods of its administration to the varying need of the nations and people called of God into the union of His Church.

The first three points could be accepted without any controversial question. But the fourth became contentious, as the Anglican Church maintained episcopal polity within the historical episcopate and believed that all its bishops and priests could trace an unbroken line of succession from St. Peter; whereas the rest of the churches in the negotiations conformed to other ecclesiastical polities and did not subscribe to the Anglican views on apostolic succession. After extensive dialogues, an agreement was reached that all who were already ordained in any of the uniting churches would be received as ministers in the united Church; provided all new ordinations after the union, would be conferred by episcopally ordained bishops of the united Church, with the imposition of hands. The intention was to introduce an episcopate in historic succession (from Anglicanism) into the new united Church and to ensure its maintenance in the future, by keeping all subsequent ordinations episcopal.

The Church of South India as it exists today came into being with the perseverance and committed efforts of Rev. Vedam Santiago, who for a long period of time took leadership of the SIUC, the South Indian United Churches, which later, with the joint efforts of Rev. V Santiago and Bishop Azariah became the Church of South India.

=== Formation ===
The Church of South India union ceremony happened at St George's Cathedral in Madras on 27 September 1947, a month after India achieved its independence from the United Kingdom. It was formed from the union of the SIUC, (South India United Church itself a union of churches from the Congregational, Presbyterian and Reformed traditions); the southern provinces of the (Anglican) Church of India, Pakistan, Burma and Ceylon; and the Methodist Church of South India. The inaugural service was presided by Bishop Rt. Rev. C. K. Jacob, of the Anglican diocese of Travancore and Cochin. As part of it, nine new bishops, drawn from all the traditions, were consecrated to serve with five Anglican bishops already in the office. Each new bishop was ordained with the imposition of hands by the presiding bishop, along with two more Anglican bishops (Rt. Rev. Michael Hollis and Rt. Rev. George Selwyn) and six presbyters from the uniting Churches, also laying hands. This reconciliation of the Anglican views with those of the other uniting denominations, on the doctrine of apostolic succession, realized in the formation of the Church of South India, is often cited as a landmark in the ecumenical movement.

The Rt. Rev. C. K. Jacob presiding over the Church of South India inaugural service

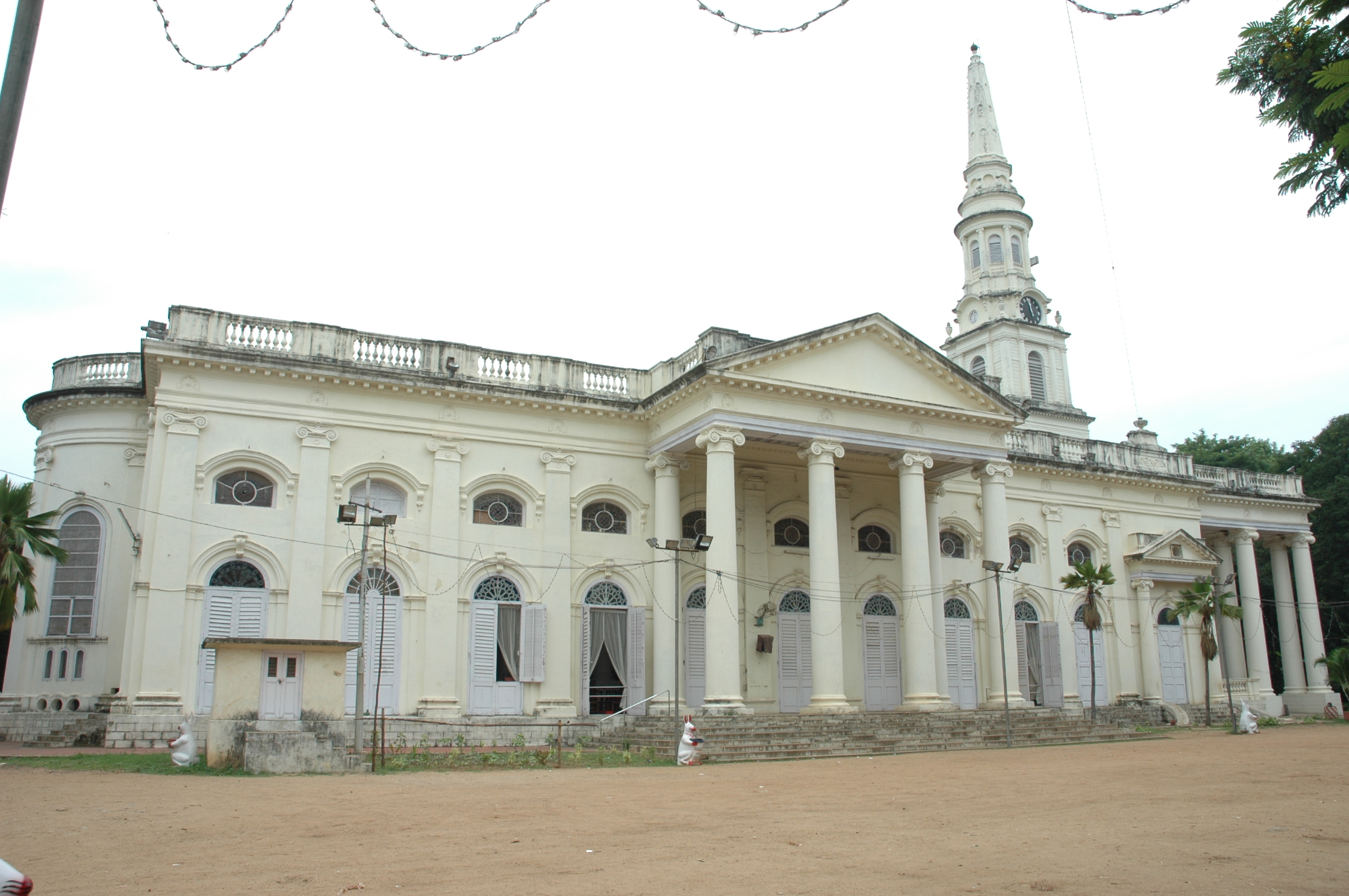
St George's Cathedral

== Logo ==
The logo of the Church of South India consists of a Cross superimposed on a stylized Lotus flower depicting split tongue for Holy Spirit in a white backdrop; around which the motto and name of the Church, is embossed. It was designed by J. Vasanthan of the American College, Madurai.

The imposing central position of the Cross denotes the foundation of the Church and its faith, while its four arms of the same length promulgates equality. The Lotus flower, called Pankaj meaning "mud-born" in Sanskrit, has been of great spiritual and symbolic significance in India, since ancient times. Its placement in the Logo, proclaims the indigenous nature of the Church of South India and its dependence on the grace of God, just as a Lotus that blooms at sunrise and closes at sunset, depends on the Sun. The stylized rendering, makes the Lotus petals simultaneously depict the fiery split tongues of the Holy Spirit. The motto of the CSI embossed on the logo, which is an excerpt of Jesus's prayer in John 17:21, is used as an inclusive affirmation of the need for the unity of all people.

== Beliefs and practices ==
The Church of South India is a Trinitarian Church that draws from the traditions and heritage of its constituent denominations. The Church accepts the Chalcedonian Christological Definition, as well as the Apostles' Creed and the Nicene Creed. Both creeds are included in the Church liturgy as the profession of faith. The Church practices infant baptism for children born in Christian homes and adult or believer's baptism for others. Baptized children are members of the church and share in the privileges and obligations of membership so far as they are capable of doing so.

The Church of South India practices the rite of Confirmation, by which the confirmands (those being confirmed) upon profession of their Christian faith, obtain confirmation of their baptisms and thereafter, get to partake fully in the privileges and obligations associated with Church membership. Secondarily, this is also a coming of age ceremony. Confirmation is almost always administered by a Bishop with the imposition of hands and occasionally by a Presbyter who is authorized to confirm.

=== Capital punishment ===
The Church of South India opposes the death penalty.

=== Women's ordination ===
The CSI recommended the ordination of women to the priesthood in 1972. Since 1984, the CSI has ordained women to the priesthood. In 2013, the CSI consecrated its first female bishop, Eggoni Pushpalalitha. The Church of South India, since 1984, has allowed women's ordination. Additionally, "it has taken up issues of gender, dalits and landlessness."

=== LGBTQIA+ Ordination and Beliefs ===
Many dioceses of the CSI church have confirmed that transgender persons may be ordained as clergy. On transgender issues, the Diocese of Madras has a ministry specifically for transgender people. In 2012, the denomination invited a transgender pastor to preach.

In 2016, a seminary affiliated with the CSI offered a seminar on LGBT issues. "The Tamil Nadu Theological Seminary in Madurai held a two-hour seminar on gender and sexuality..." Bishops and other clergy have supported LGBTQ inclusion through the church's publication, CSI Life.

The National Council of Churches in India, of which the CSI is a member, supported the legalization of consensual same-sex relationships in India.

In 2015, St. Mark's Cathedral, Bangalore hosted an event, co-led by the Rev. Vincent Rajkumar, aimed at denouncing homophobia. CSI clergy, working with the National Council of Churches in India also co-led a consultation speaking out against homophobia. The British Broadcasting Corporation (BBC) listed the Church of South India as being among the Anglican provinces open to blessing same-sex couples.

== Liturgy ==
The CSI Synod Liturgical Congress has developed several new orders for worship for different occasions. The order for the Communion service, known as the CSI Liturgy, has been internationally acclaimed as an important model for new liturgies. The committee has also produced three different cycles of lectionaries for daily Bible readings and "propers", and collects for Communion services. In addition, the committee has also brought out a supplement to the Book of Common Worship. Cherishing the reformation principle of worship in the native language, the CSI liturgy and church services are completely in the vernacular, in all the different South Indian states and Northern Sri Lanka, which comprise its ecclesiastical province.

== Observances and festivals ==
The important observances and festivals include Lent (including its first day, Ash Wednesday), Passion Week, Palm Sunday, Maundy Thursday, Good Friday, Easter, Ascension Thursday, Pentecost, Lammas and Christmas.

== Constitution ==
The Constitution of the CSI is the key document that governs the administration and management of the church. It comprises 14 chapters detailing rules for the functioning of the Church at every level, from local congregations to the pastorate, dioceses and the Synod. The most important part of the CSI Constitution is "The Governing Principles of the Church" which sets out 21 governing principles on which the other chapters of the Constitution and the rules contained therein rest. While amending any part of the Constitution can be approved by a two-thirds majority of the Synod, amending the Governing Principles requires a three-fourths majority.

== Ecumenism ==
As a united Protestant Church, the Church of South Indian is a member of the World Methodist Council, as well as the World Communion of Reformed Churches; as a constituent member of the Anglican Communion its bishops participate in the Lambeth Conferences. It also has representation in the Anglican Consultative Council. Consequently, the CSI is in full communion with the Old Catholic Churches of the Union of Utrecht and the Philippine Independent Church. It is a member of the World Council of Churches, the World Alliance of Reformed Churches, Christian Conference of Asia and the National Council of Churches in India. Through the Communion of Churches in India, it is also in partnership and full communion with the Church of North India and the Mar Thoma Syrian Church.

The Church of South India maintains close partnerships with the Church of Scotland, Episcopal Church of the United States, Methodist Church of Great Britain, Presbyterian Church in Korea, Presbyterian Church in the Republic of Korea, Presbyterian Church of India, Presbyterian Church (USA), Reformed Church in America, United Church of Christ and the Uniting Church in Australia.

== Administration ==
The church accepts the Lambeth Quadrilateral as its basis and recognises the historical episcopate in its constitutional form. Like Anglican and most other episcopal Churches, the ministry of the Church of South India is structured with three holy orders of bishops, priests and deacons.

== Synod ==
The church is governed by a synod based in Chennai and headed by a presiding bishop bearing the title of Moderator, who is elected every three years. The officers were elected for a three-year term at the Synod meeting. The present officers of the synod are The Rt. Rev. K. Reuben Mark, Deputy Moderator & Moderator in-charge, CSI, Adv. C. Fernandas Rathina Raja, General Secretary, CSI, B. Vimal Sukumar, Hon.Treasurer, CSI.

The church runs 2,300 schools, 150 colleges and 104 hospitals in South India. In the 1960s the church became conscious of its social responsibility and started organising rural development projects. There are 50 such projects all over India, 50 training centres for young people and 600 residential hostels for a total of 50,000 children.

== Dioceses ==
The church is further divided into twenty-six dioceses, each under the supervision of a bishop, including one diocese encompassing Jaffna, Sri Lanka. The dioceses are governed by diocesan councils composed of all clergy in the diocese as well as lay people elected from the local congregations. Each church will have representation in diocesan council based on their membership. The diocese is headed by the Bishop, who is a presbyter elected through the Diocesan Council. He is considered as the head of the diocese and all the institutions belonging to the diocese. Other than the Bishop, the following are the important administrative posts of each diocese:

- Clergy Secretary: Manages all the activities of the pastoral & evangelical workers in the diocese
- Lay Secretary: Manages all the lay workers' activities in the diocese
- Educational Secretary: Manages all educational institutions and the workers of those institutions
- Diocesan Treasurer: Manages all the income and expenditures of the diocese.

The Diocesan Council also consists of Diocesan Executive Committee, Diocesan Standing Committee, and Pastorate Committee.

Name	Headquarters	Location	Bishop (The Right Reverend)
Krishna-Godavari Diocese	Machilipatnam	Andhra Pradesh	T. George Cornelious
Nandyal Diocese	Nandyal	Andhra Pradesh	K. Santhosh Prasanna Rao
Rayalaseema Diocese	Kadapa	Andhra Pradesh	P. Issac Vara Prasad
Dornakal Diocese	Dornakal	Telangana	K. Padmarao
Medak Diocese	Medak	Telangana	Moderator's Commissary
Karimnagar Diocese	Karimnagar	Telangana	K. Reuben Mark
Karnataka Central Diocese	Bangalore	Karnataka	Vincent Vinod Kumar
Karnataka Northern Diocese	Dharwad	Karnataka	Martin C Borgai
Karnataka Southern Diocese	Mangalore	Karnataka	HemaChandra Kumar
East Kerala Diocese	Melukavu	Kerala	V. S. Francis
Cochin Diocese	Kochi	Kerala	Kurian Peter
Kollam-Kottarakara Diocese	Kollam	Kerala	Jose George
Madhya Kerala Diocese	Kottayam	Kerala	Malayil Sabu Koshy Cherian
Malabar Diocese	Kozhikode	Kerala	Royce Manoj Kumar Victor
South Kerala Diocese	Trivandrum	Kerala	Prinstone Ben
Coimbatore Diocese	Coimbatore	Tamil Nadu	S. Prince Calvin
Erode-Salem Diocese	Erode	Tamil Nadu	J. Victor Raj
Kanyakumari Diocese	Nagercoil	Tamil Nadu	S. Christopher Vijayan
Madras Diocese	Chennai	Tamil Nadu	Paul Francis Ravichandran
Madurai-Ramnad Diocese	Madurai	Tamil Nadu	Jeyasingh Prince Prabhakaran
Thoothukudi-Nazareth Diocese	Thoothukudi	Tamil Nadu	Moderator's Commissary
Tirunelveli Diocese	Tirunelveli	Tamil Nadu	A.R.G.S.T. Barnabas
Trichy-Tanjore Diocese	Tiruchirappalli	Tamil Nadu	S. Samuel Rajadurai
Vellore Diocese	Vellore	Tamil Nadu	Sharma Nithiyanandam
Jaffna Diocese	Jaffna	Sri Lanka	Veluppillai Pathmathyalan

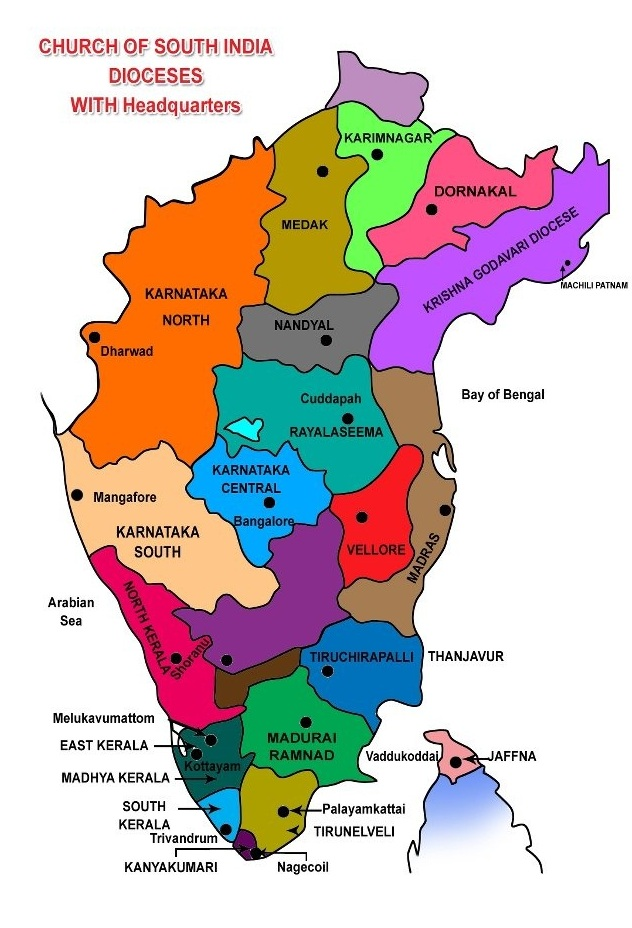
Church of South India Dioceses and headquarters.

== Affiliations ==
=== Theological education ===
The church recognizes theological degrees granted by institutions affiliated with the Board of Theological Education of the Senate of Serampore College. These include:

- Kerala United Theological Seminary (KUTS), Trivandrum, Kerala
- Mennonite Brethren Centenary Bible College (MBCBC), Shamshabad, Telangana
- Andhra Christian Theological College (ACTC), Hyderabad, Telangana
- Bethel Bible College (BBC), Guntur, Andhra Pradesh
- Gurukul Lutheran Theological College & Research Institute (GLTCRI), Chennai, Tamil Nadu
- Tamil Nadu Theological Seminary (TTS), Madurai, Tamil Nadu
- Union Biblical Seminary (UBS), Pune, Maharashtra
- United Theological College, Bangalore (UTC), Karnataka
- South Asia Theological Research Institute (SATHRI), Bangalore, Karnataka
- Karnataka Theological College (KTC), Mangalore, Karnataka
- Bishops College (BC), Calcutta, West Bengal
- Serampore College (SC), Serampore, West Bengal

== See also ==
- Anglican Communion
- Church of North India
- Christianity in India
- Christianity in Kerala
- Christianity in Tamil Nadu
- Christianity in Karnataka
- Telugu Christian
- St. Thomas Christians
