= All Saints Church, Secunderabad =

CSI-All Saints Church
- CSI-All Saints Church
- 17°23′N 78°28′E
- Country: India
- Denomination: Church of South India (A Uniting church comprising Wesleyan Methodist, Congregational, Lutheran, Calvinist and Anglican missionary societies – SPG, WMMS, LMS, Basel Mission, CMS, and the Church of England)
- Churchmanship: High church

History
- Dedication: All Saints

Administration
- Province: Secunderabad
- Diocese: Diocese of Medak

Clergy
- Bishop(s): The Right Reverend A. C. Solomon Raj, CSI

CSI-All Saints Church is a church under the auspices of the Church of South India. It is located in the Trimulgherry locality of Secunderabad. It was originally a Garrison Church, presided by Army Chaplains, but was subsequently bequeathed to the Church of South India, a uniting Church in 1947. The church currently serves the Tamil speaking congregation of Secunderabad and offers services in English every week and in Tamil every week.

== History ==
All Saints Church was constructed in 1860 to serve the British Cantonment of Secunderabad. The church was the first permanent structure in the Trimulgherry Entrenchment.

== Architecture ==
The church is an imposing Gothic structure with a multitude of turrets and a tower belfry. The church's altar piece is a beautiful stained glass window depicting Jesus carrying the cross. The window is dated 1884 and dedicated to the memory of Edward Dawson, Lieutenant of Royal Artillery. Sixteen memorial tablets along the walls of the church describe the various British officers who lived and died at Secunderabad.

Antique pews, lamps, and a baptismal font are some of the prized possessions of the church. The church received the INTACH Heritage award from the Government of Andhra Pradesh for good maintenance.

== Queen's visit ==
In 1983, Queen Elizabeth II visited the church The Queen also visited the nearby Holy Trinity Church, Bolarum where she celebrated her 36th wedding anniversary along with Prince Philip in a service led by Bishop Victor Premasagar.

== Worship services ==
- All Sundays : 7:30 am. Holy Communion Service in English
- All Sundays: 9:00 am. Holy Communion Service in Tamil
- All Sundays: 7:00 pm. English Evensong Holy Communion Service

== See also ==
- List of churches in Secunderabad and Hyderabad
- Holy Trinity Church, Bolarum
