= Samuel Kanaka Prasad =

21st-century Indian bishop

Bishop Emeritus T. S. Kanaka Prasad, CSI Ayyagaru
- Bishop Emeritus–in–Medak
- Church: Church of South India (A Uniting church comprising Wesleyan Methodist, Congregational, Lutheran, Calvinist and Anglican missionary societies – SPG, WMMS, LMS, Basel Mission, CMS, and the Church of England)
- Diocese: Diocese of Medak
- See: Medak
- Appointed: 2009
- Predecessor: B. P. Sugandhar, CSI
- Successor: A. C. Solomon Raj, CSI
- Previous post: Pastor

Orders
- Ordination: 1983 by Bishop Victor Premasagar
- Consecration: 17 August 2009 by The Most Reverend J. W. Gladstone, Moderator and Principal Consecrator and The Right Reverend Christopher Asir, Deputy Moderator and Co-consecrator
- Rank: Bishop

Personal details
- Born: August 5, 1950 Telangana
- Denomination: Christianity
- Residence: Secunderabad
- Parents: Smt. Esther and Sri Thalari Samuel
- Occupation: Priesthood

Bishop Emeritus T. S. Kanaka Prasad was the sixth successor of Frank Whittaker and seventh Bishop–in–Medak for the Diocese of Medak of the Church of South India (CSI) during the period 2009–2012.

== Ministerial formation ==
During the bishopric of H. D. L. Abraham, Kanaka Prasad entered the priesthood and studied spirituality in ecclesiastical institutions in Andhra Pradesh and Telangana.

=== Andhra Pradesh ===
==== Ramayapatnam ====
Kanaka Prasad first underwent a year of propadeutic studies at the STBC-Ramayapatnam Baptist Theological College in Ramayapatnam in Nellore district during the principalship of Louis F. Knoll where he was also taught by the Old Testament scholar, G. Solomon and the Church historian R. Joseph.

==== Rajamahendravaram ====
After a year of study at Ramayapatnam, Kanaka Prasad moved to the Andhra Christian Theological College then located at Rajamahendravaram where he enrolled for spiritual studies during the principalship of W. D. Coleman and studied under notable faculty including G. Devasahayam, W. P. Peery, G. Solomon, M. Victor Paul, S. Joseph, Victor Premasagar, B. E. Devaraj, Eric J. Lott, Muriel Spurgeon Carder and Waldo Penner.

=== Telangana ===
Kanaka Prasad then studied at the Andhra Christian Theological College, which by then had moved to Hyderabad, during the period of the Old Testament scholars, Victor Premasagar, CSI and G. Babu Rao, CBCNC.

== Bishopric ==
When B. P. Sugandhar retired from the bishopric, T. S. Kanaka Prasad contested the vacant bishopric and was elected as the eighth Bishop in Medak and consecrated on 17 August 2009 at the CSI-Medak Cathedral by then Moderator, The Most Reverend John Wilson Gladstone, the principal consecrator and The Right Reverend Christopher Asir, the co-consecrator in the presence of bishops including S. J. Theodore, Bishop - in - Karimnagar, P. J. Lawrence Bishop - in - Nandyal and others as well as clergy from the Diocese of Medak led by A. C. Solomon Raj, who succeeded Kanaka Prasad to the bishopric of Medak.

Honorary titles
Preceded by B. P. Sugandhar, CSI	Member, Board of Governors, Andhra Christian Theological College, Secunderabad; 2009-2012	Succeeded by A. C. Solomon Raj, CSI
Religious titles
Preceded by B. P. Sugandhar, CSI	CSI-Bishop in Medak, Medak; 2009-2012	Succeeded by A. C. Solomon Raj, CSI
