= St Joseph's Cathedral, Hyderabad =

St. Joseph's Cathedral
- St. Joseph's Cathedral
- 17.393°N 78.473°E
- Country: India
- Denomination: Roman Catholic

History
- Dedication: St. Joseph

Administration
- Province: Hyderabad, India
- Diocese: Roman Catholic Archdiocese of Hyderabad

Clergy
- Archbishop: Anthony Poola
- Priest: Reverend Father Bala Showry

St Joseph's Cathedral is a Roman Catholic Cathedral in Hyderabad, India. It is the cathedral of the Archdiocese of Hyderabad and one of the most beautiful churches of Hyderabad and Secunderabad cities of Telangana, India.

== History ==
Established in 1820 AD, the construction of the present structure began in 1869 when Fr. Antonio Tagliabue of the Pontifical Institute for Foreign Missions (PIME), bought an extensive plot of land near Chaderghat, in what is now called Gunfoundry (so named for the ammunition centre built there by the Nizam of Hyderabad), to build a school, a church and a convent. Msgr. Pietro Caprotti (Pontifical Institute for Foreign Missions), laid its foundation on 18 March 1870, the eve of the Solemnity of Saint Joseph. Fr. Luigi Malberti (Pontifical Institute for Foreign Missions), took charge in 1872 and completed the main building, which was consecrated and opened for divine worship on Christmas Eve of 1875. Hyderabad was made a separate diocese in 1886 AD, and in a consistory held in 1887, Pope Leo XIII declared St. Joseph's as the Cathedral of the diocese. It was elevated as a 'Metropolitan See' archdiocese in 1953.

== Architecture ==
The façade and the bell towers were completed in 1891. The huge bells, imported from Italy, were installed in 1892 AD. The bells are tuned in such a fashion that many hymns can be played on different themes especially hymn of our Lady "Ave Maria" . The centre hall is very big and hence it can accommodate about 500 people at a time for prayers. In the main alcove inside the church, there is an imitation of the famous Pietà by Michelangelo.

Extensive renovation work was performed on the roof and interior of the structure between 2004 and 2008, making it necessary at one point for Mass to be held in the newly constructed multipurpose hall on the cathedral grounds. A beautiful 6-foot-high (1.8 m) granite wainscot has been added to the cathedral sanctuary walls and column bases, and new granite flooring has been added throughout, as well as a new roof, new lighting and electrical fixtures. Much of the artwork, including the beautifully carved marble side altars and marble statues of Mother Mary and St Anthony, an antique European oil painting of the Blessed Mother and Christ Child (Madonna and the Child by Bartolomé Esteban Murillo)which was gifted to the cathedral by one of the Nizams, an antique set of the Stations of the Cross in high bas-relief made by European craftsmen, and various other statues, were cleaned and restored at this time. In December 2007, the cathedral was re-opened for the celebration of Holy Mass during the Christmas celebrations. Extensive construction on the grounds, including the grand entrance stairway from the street to the cathedral, and a large terrace with a multipurpose hall below, was begun in 2001 under the administration of then parish priest, Rev. Fr. T. Lourdu. The renovation was completed during the tenure of Rev. Fr. C Arogyam.

== Location ==
The church is located at Gunfoundry, north of Abids and King Kothi, in Hyderabad, India.

Google map: St Joseph's Cathedral, Hyderabad, India

== Masses offered ==
Daily Mass:

- 6:00 am (English)
- 6:00 pm (English)

Sundays:

- 6:30 am (English)
- 8:00 am (English)
- 9:15 am (Telugu)
- 11:30 am (English)
- 6:00 pm (English)

Christmas and Easter :

- 10:30 pm (Midnight Mass-English)
- 6:30 am (English)
- 8:00 am (English)
- 9:15 am (Telugu)
- Please note there is no evening mass.

== See also ==
- All Saints High School
- List of churches in Secunderabad and Hyderabad
- Most Reverend M. Joji, Archbishop of Hyderabad
- St. George's Church, Hyderabad
