= St. George's Church, Hyderabad =

CSI-St. George's Church
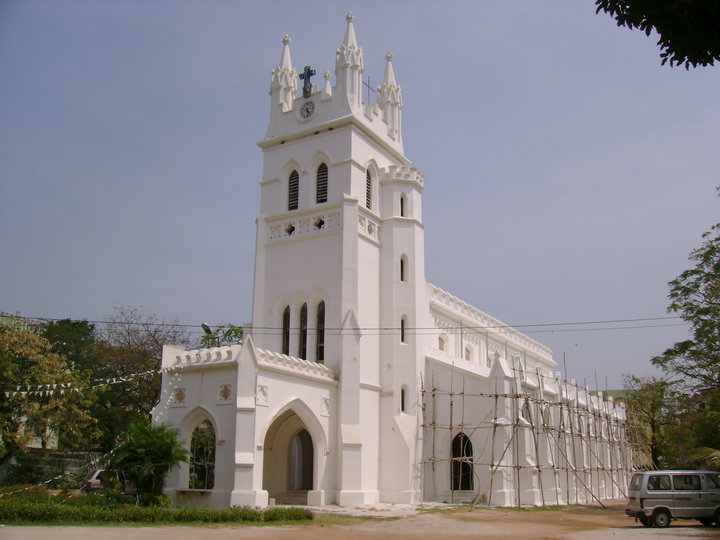
- CSI-St. George's Church, Hyderabad
- CSI-St. George's Church
- Location: Hyderabad
- Country: India
- Denomination: Church of South India (A Uniting church comprising Wesleyan Methodist, Congregational, Lutheran, Calvinist and Anglican missionary societies – SPG, WMMS, LMS, Basel Mission, CMS, and the Church of England)
- Tradition: High Anglican
- Churchmanship: High church

History
- Founded: 1844; 182 years ago
- Founder: Church Missionary Society (CMS)
- Dedication: St. George

Architecture
- Functional status: Active

Administration
- Diocese: Diocese of Medak

Clergy
- Bishop(s): The Right Reverend A. C. Solomon Raj, CSI

CSI-St. George's Church was built in 1844 AD by the Church Missionary Society (CMS) and has been unionized in 1947 into the Church of South India, a uniting Church.

== History ==
The power struggle in the Nizam's State involved both the British and the French and both sides continued to struggle until in 1758, the French forces were recalled to Pondicherry to take part in the attack on Madras. In 1779 a British Resident was installed at the court of the Nizam. Eleven years later under the terms of a fresh treaty, two battalions of Sepoys under British officers were supplied to the Nizam who was responsible for their salaries. A separate clause stipulated that these men were not to be used against the allies of the company. So gradually the British became a force to be reckoned with not only in military terms but also financially.

Through this period numerous families made their mark in Hyderabad Civil and Military Service under the Nizam's Government and their influence not only helped shape the city but also the church, which in this case was firstly Christ Church and then St. George's. It is pertinent that some recognition is given to these families by briefly mentioning them and their achievements in Hyderabad. The increase of families settling and growing in Hyderabad necessitated the need for a Church. It was then through the good grace of Nizam that this was made possible.

About 1836 under a Firman-e-Mubarak the Community through the good offices of the Resident obtained a piece of land from the Nizam with permission to build a Church. Thus a small Church the present Boys' School, was erected in 1844 and built by the congregation. It was known as Christ Church. Rev Frank Penny in his book on the Churches that were constructed in South India says the Chaderghat folk are very proud of their Church.

The Baptism Register of this original Church which is still held in the St. George's Vestry, has as its introduction the following words penned:

The Church near the Residency to which this register belongs was built by voluntary subscriptions for the use of the Protestant inhabitants worshipping according to the form and manner of the Church of England with the sanction of the Supreme Government of India, on a piece of ground granted for the purpose by His Highness the Nizam's Government at the instance of the British Resident at Hyderabad.

The plan of the building was furnished by Mr. T.W.Wray, Postmaster, who was devoted such time to Superintendence of the work.

The foundation stone was laid in February 1844 and the building complete and opened for Divine Service on 19 September 1844.

== Worship Services ==
Sunday:

- Holy Communion Service - 8 30 am

== See also ==
- List of churches in Secunderabad and Hyderabad
- St Joseph's Cathedral, Hyderabad
