= Christ Church, Hyderabad =

CSI-Christ Church
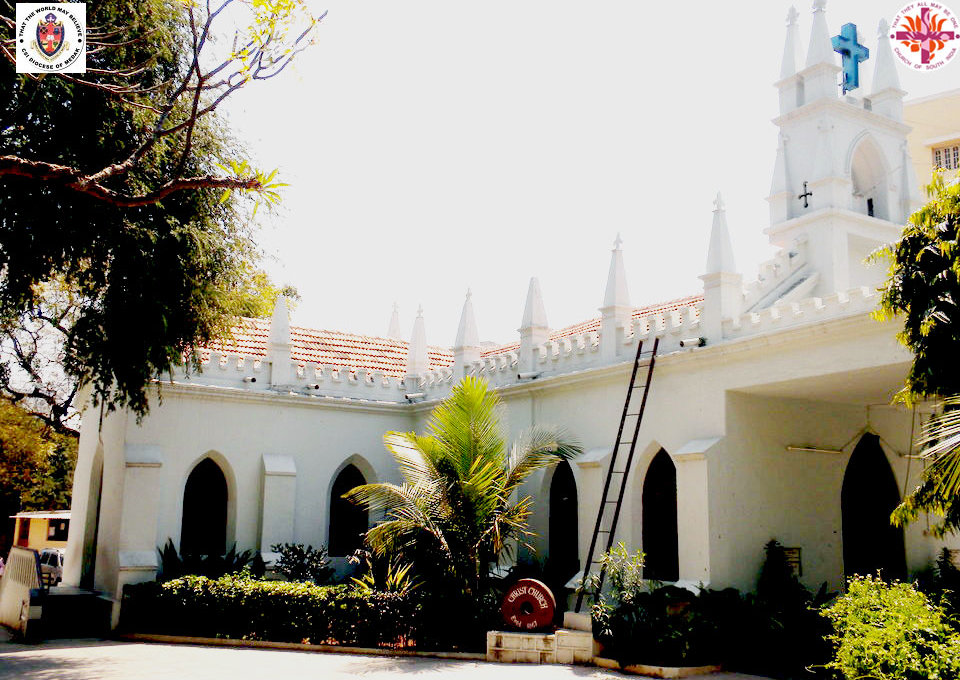
- Location: Hyderabad
- Country: India
- Denomination: Church of South India (A Uniting church comprising Wesleyan Methodist, Congregational, Lutheran, Calvinist and Anglican missionary societies – SPG, WMMS, LMS, Basel Mission, CMS, and the Church of England)
- Previous denomination: Anglican
- Churchmanship: High church

History
- Status: Church
- Founded: 1868
- Founder: Society for the Propagation of the Gospel (SPG)

Architecture
- Functional status: Active
- Heritage designation: INTACH Award
- Designated: 2013
- Architectural type: Chapel
- Style: Gothic

Specifications
- Materials: Lime and mortar

Administration
- Division: Ramkote Pastorate
- District: Town DCC
- Diocese: Diocese of Medak

Clergy
- Bishop(s): The Right Reverend A. C. Solomon Raj, CSI

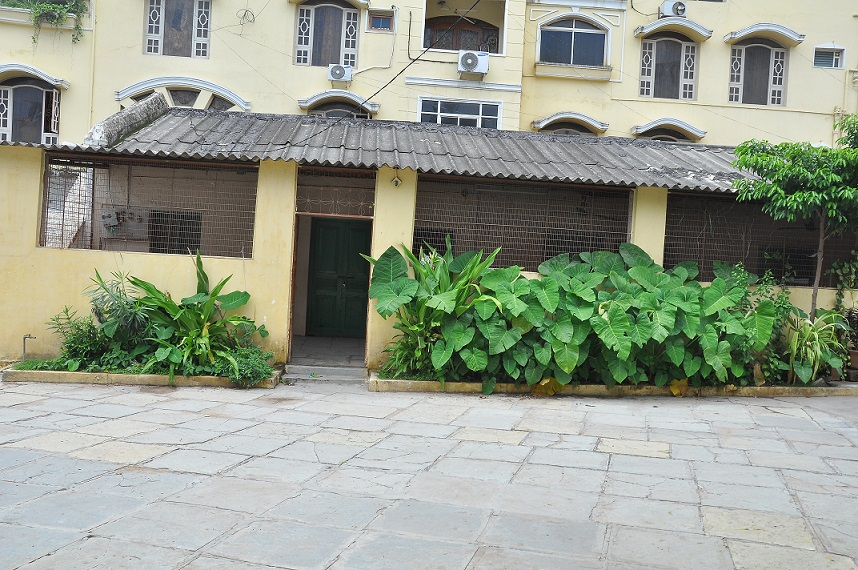
Church Parish Hall

The CSI Christ Church is one of the earliest Churches in Hyderabad, Telangana, India. The church is situated in Ramkote locality of the twin cities Hyderabad and Secunderabad and 24 km away from the Rajiv Gandhi International Airport Shamshabad. For Church administrative purposes, it falls under the ecclesiastical jurisdiction of the Diocese of Medak and caters to a diverse Tamil-speaking congregation of about 500 members. The church was consecrated and dedicated in 1869, and is the oldest Tamil Church in Hyderabad.

== History ==
=== Foundation ===
Prior to 1869, Tamil-speaking Christians from the Hyderabad area travelled all the way to St. Thomas's church in Secunderabad with their families in bullock-carts to worship in Tamil, which proved to be a hardship and inconvenience. In 1867, the Nizams' Government, with Prime Minister Sir Salar Jung, donated a small parcel of land with sufficient donations to construct a church. The foundation stone was laid by the wife of Major General Grant, commanding subsidiary forces of Secunderabad in 1867 after an impressive address by Sir Richard Temple. In two years' time, Christ Church was constructed, and dedicated in 1869 on Christmas Eve by the Rt. Rev. Frederic Gell, Bishop of Madras Diocese.

=== Inauguration of the diocese ===
On 3 October 1947, the churches in South India united to form the "Church of South India (CSI) Medak Diocese". The Rev. Whittaker, chairman of Wesley Church Hyderabad, was consecrated as the first Bishop of the diocese, and in 1950 he ordained Rev. G. D. Samuel to minister to the Christ Church congregation. Since 1947, eight Bishops have contributed to the edification of the church and its activities.

=== 1970 centenary celebration ===
In commemoration of the church's 100-year history (1869–1969) in Hyderabad, the church building was enlarged. Construction was made possible by contributions from church members and a loan from the Diocese.

=== Christ Church High School ===
On 15 June 1979, Christ Church School, located inside the church compound, was inaugurated by founding members Rev. D. Justus Moni (first Manager and Correspondent), Mrs. Enid. David, the late Prof. A. P. Rajaratnam, the late Mr. George Michael, the late Mr. W.A. Deva Das, the late Mr. C. John Rose and the late Mrs. Victoria Robert, Rev. S. M. Jothi Raj (Manager and Correspondent [1984–1987]), and Rev. A. Bennet(Manager and Correspondent [2003 – July 2014]). When inaugurated, the school served 8 students.

Now the school has attained high school status, and has grown to accommodate 500 children. 100% results have been reported in SSC in the last few years. The Rev. S. Sathia Joseph has served as Manager and Correspondent since July 2014, and Mrs. Shirley Solomon, the present Head Mistress, now leads a staff of 15 teachers and 5 support staff.

=== Post-Centenary silver jubilee celebration (1869–1994) ===
This celebration was inaugurated on 2 October 1994 by Bishop B. P. Sugandhar at the confirmation service, and began with various construction projects such as the extension of the wings of the church, repairing of the roof, addition of a choir vestry, etc. Special meetings with Dr. Ken Gnanakan were held on 26 and 27 November 1994.

=== Clergy ===
Nearly 29 clergy have served Christ Church since 1880:

- 1880–1887, Rev. A. Sebastian, CSI
- 1947–1949, Rev. S. Christudoss, CSI
- 1949–1957, Rev. G. D. Samuel, CSI
- 1957–1959, Rev. J. V. Navamani Raj, CSI
- 1960–1960, Rev. T. Krishna Rao, CSI
- 1961–1964, Dr. A. C. Abraham, Laity
- 1964–1965, Rev. P. R. Dharma Raj, CSI
- 1965–1967, Rev. G. D. Samuel, CSI
- 1967–1968, Rev. P. R. Dharma Raj, CSI
- 1968–1978, Dr. A. C. Abraham, Laity
- 1978–1982, Rev. G. D. Samuel, CSI
- 1978–1984, Rev. D. Justus Moni, CSI
- 1984–1987, Rev. S. M. Jothi Raj, CSI
- 1987–1993, Rev. A. Bennet, CSI
- 1993–2003, Rev. D. Justus Moni, CSI
- 2003–2014, Rev. A. Bennet, CSI
- 2014-2023 Rev. S. Sathia Joseph, CSI
- 2023–present Rev. Naveen Kumar, CSI

== Buildings ==
Built in the Gothic Revival style, the main church building was designed with a wing on both sides in the shape of a cross, and can accommodate 300 members. The roof supporting structure was strengthened in the year 2008 from funds donated by the congregation and the Diocese.

The church also has a Parish Hall which can accommodate about 250 people, constructed from contributions received from church members. First proposed by the late Rev. A. Ezekiel, the hall was constructed under the personal supervision of Rev. G. D. Samuel, with foundation and basement work initiated by Dr. E. B. Christian.

The Rev. Dr. A. C. Abraham Hall is also located inside the church compound which is used for conducting committee meetings and other discussions.

== Intach Heritage Award ==
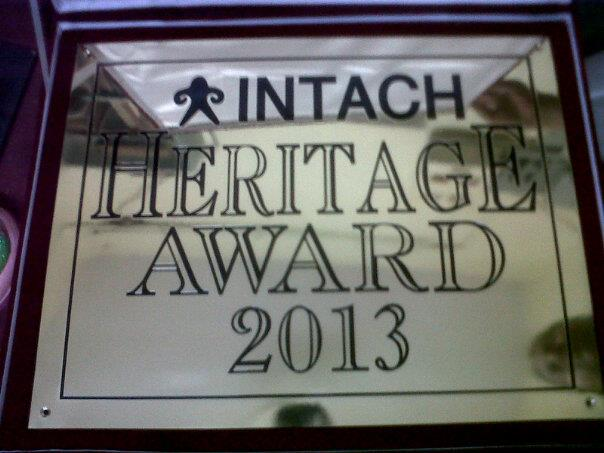
Intach Church Award (2013)

On 18 April 2013, the church was honored with the Intach Heritage Award, presented by the Indian National Trust for Art and Cultural Heritage, for the church's representation of Gothic Revival architecture.
