= Eber Priestley =

Eber Priestley, CSI
- Bishop in Medak
- Church: Church of South India
- See: Medak
- In office: 1 November 1961–1967
- Predecessor: Frank Whittaker
- Successor: H. D. L. Abraham

Orders
- Consecration: 1961

Eber Priestley was the first successor of Frank Whittaker as Bishop in Medak.

== Studies ==
Eber Priestley was a graduate of the University of Birmingham, Birmingham.

== Writings ==
- The Church of South India: Adventure in Union
- The New Pattern of the Church: A Summary of Developments in the Diocese of Medak

Religious titles
Preceded by Frank Whittaker	Bishop in Medak; 1961–1967	Succeeded by H. D. L. Abraham
Honorary titles
Preceded by Frank Whittaker	Member; Board of Governors; Andhra Union Theological College, Dornakal; 1961–1964	Succeeded by Post disbanded
Preceded by Post created	Member; Board of Governors; Andhra Christian Theological College, Rajahmundry; 1964–1967	Succeeded by H. D. L. Abraham
