= A. C. Solomon Raj =

Indian Bishop of Medak

The Right Reverend A. C. Solomon Raj, CSI Ayyagaru
- Bishop in Medak
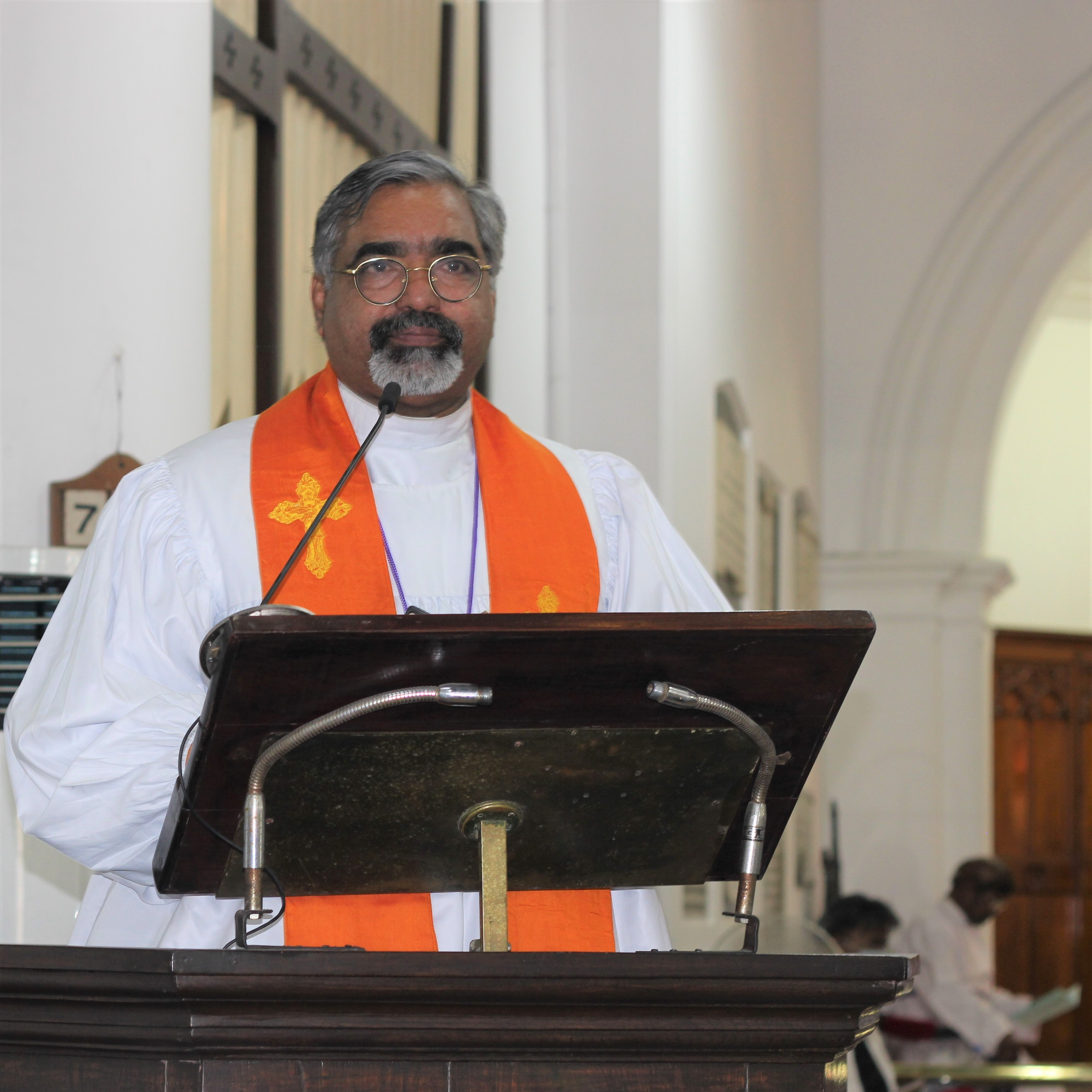
- Bishop Solomon Raj celebrating Good Friday Mass in 2021
- Church: Church of South India
- Diocese: Diocese of Medak
- See: Medak
- Appointed: 12.10.2016
- Predecessor: T. S. Kanaka Prasad
- Successor: Incumbent
- Previous post: Pastor

Orders
- Ordination: As Deacon on 10 October 1992, As Presbyter on 5.4.1994 by Victor Premasagar and B. P. Sugandhar
- Consecration: 13 October 2016 by G. Dyvasirvadam, Moderator (Principal Consecrator); Thomas K Oommen, Deputy Moderator (Co-consecrator)
- Rank: Bishop

Personal details
- Born: Avulamanda Christopher Solomon Raj; March 18, 1961 (age 65) Telangana, India
- Denomination: Christianity
- Residence: Medak
- Spouse: Vajra Solomon
- Children: Daughter (Shilpa); two sons (Finny, Benjamin)
- Occupation: Priesthood
- Education: B.Com. (Osmania), B.D. (Serampore), M.Th. (Serampore)
- Alma mater: Giriraj Government College, Nizamabad (Telangana); United Theological College, Bangalore (Karnataka)

A. C. Solomon Raj (born 18 March 1961) is the seventh successor of Frank Whittaker and eighth Bishop in Medak of the Protestant Church of South India Society and shepherds the Diocese from the Cathedra of the Bishop housed in the CSI-Medak Cathedral in Medak Town, Telangana, India. On 12 October 2016, the Church of South India Synod headquartered in Chennai, appointed Solomon Raj to assume the ecclesiastical Office of the Bishopric of Medak and was consecrated the next day on 13 October 2016 at the CSI-St. George's Cathedral, Chennai, ending four years of sede vacante in the Diocese of Medak which was without a bishop during the intervening period of 2012–2016.

Solomon Raj is an eloquent speaker with near native fluency in Telugu, Hindi, and English. His sermons centre around the eschatologies of the end times focusing on Christ. He spent nearly a decade undergoing spiritual studies under Old Testament Scholars E. C. John, CSI and Gnana Robinson, CSI at the United Theological College, Bangalore, an affiliated seminary of the Senate of Serampore College (University), India's first University {a university under Section 2 (f) of the University Grants Commission Act, 1956} founded by the Baptist Missions led by Joshua Marshman, William Carey, and William Ward.

== Studies and ministerial formation ==
=== Telangana ===
For early schooling and pre-university studies, Solomon Raj enrolled at the educational institutions established by the Christian missions, the Wesleyan Methodist Missionary Society and studied at Bellampalli, Nizamabad and Secunderabad and took a basic degree from a State-run institution in Nizamabad. Solomon Raj first schooled at the CSI-Wesley Boys School on Colonel Prenderghast Road in Secunderabad and later pursued collegiate studies at the Giriraj Government College in Nizamabad leading to B.Com.

=== Karnataka ===
==== Spiritual studies ====
During the Bishopric of the Old Testament Scholar, the Cantabrigian Victor Premasagar, CSI, Solomon Raj was admitted as a ministerial candidate of the Diocese of Medak to discern his avocation towards priesthood and spent a year assisting Presbyters during 1987–1988 in the Diocese of Medak that was predominantly Wesleyan Methodist with a couple of Anglican churches in the urban pastorate.

In the ensuing year, the Diocese of Medak sent Solomon Raj to the fully-ecumenical United Theological College, a Protestant Regional Theologiate, in Bangalore where he pursued propadeutic studies during 1988–1992 during the Principalship of the leading Old Testament Scholar The Rev. E. C. John, CSI, a direct student of Old Testament's Master Specialists, Gerhard von Rad and Claus Westermann at the University of Heidelberg, Germany. During the subsequent convocation of the university held in 1993, Solomon Raj was awarded a Bachelor of Divinity degree by India's first University, the Senate of Serampore College (University), Serampore, West Bengal during the Registrarship of the New Testament Scholar, The Rev. D. S. Satyaranjan, IPC.

Between 1988 and 1992, in addition to the faculty at the seminary in Bangalore which comprised the Religious scholar, The Rev. G. D. Melanchthon, AELC, the New Testament scholar The Rev. K. James Carl, SALC and other notable faculty, Solomon Raj was also benefited by the scholarship of the visiting faculty from the Carmelites of Mary Immaculate-Dharmaram College and the St. Peter's Pontifical Seminary, also in Bangalore. Incidentally, the Homiletics Scholar The Rev. P. Surya Prakash, CSI, also hailing from the Diocese of Medak joined the college faculty in 1991, exactly a year before the final year of studies of Solomon Raj. Seminarians studying during that period included The Rev. Annie Watson, CSI while The Rt. Rev. B. D. Prasada Rao, CSI The Rev. H. R. Cabral, CSI The Rev. Jonadob Nathaniel, CSI and The Rev. Daniel Sadananda, CSI were pursuing postgraduate courses.

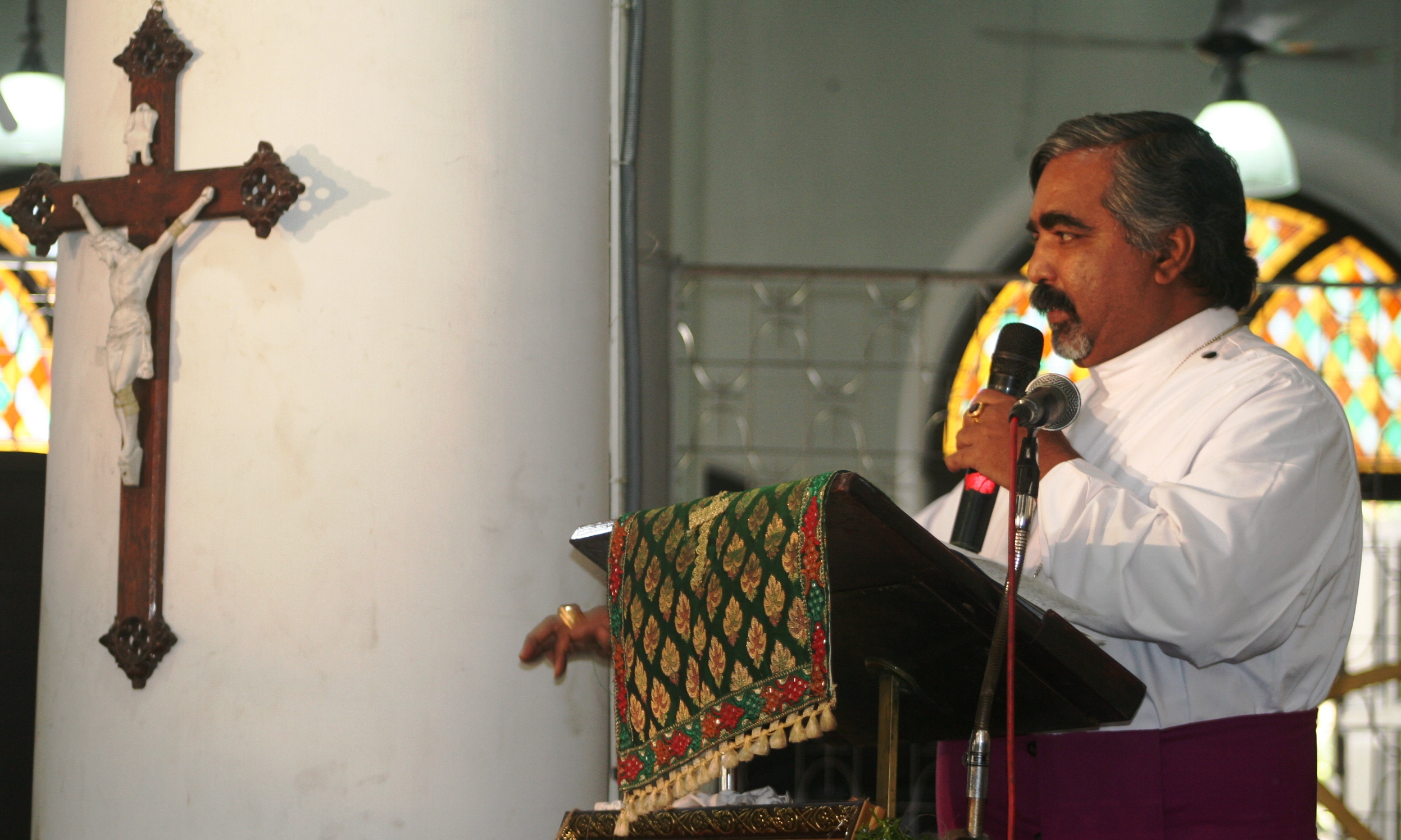
Bishop Solomon at CSI-Church of St. John the Baptist, Secunderabad in 2017.

==== Advanced spiritual studies ====
After a period of pastoral ministry, the Diocese of Medak once again re-sent Solomon Raj to the Protestant Regional Theologiate in Bangalore to upgrade his academics where Solomon Raj pursued a postgraduate course in spirituality specializing in Ethics during 1999 –2001 leading to Master of Theology during the Principalship of the Old Testament Scholar Gnana Robinson, CSI a direct student of Old Testament's Master Specialist, Klaus Koch at the University of Hamburg, Germany. Solomon Raj's postgraduate thesis was entitled Can violence be a means of achieving social justice? An ethical evaluation of the Naxalite Movement in Telangana and was subsequently published in the Bangalore Theological Journal. During the ensuing annual convocation of the Senate of Serampore College (University) held in 2002, Solomon Raj was awarded the postgraduate degree, again during the Registrarship of the New Testament Scholar, The Rev. D. S. Satyaranjan, IPC.

== Ecclesiastical ministry ==
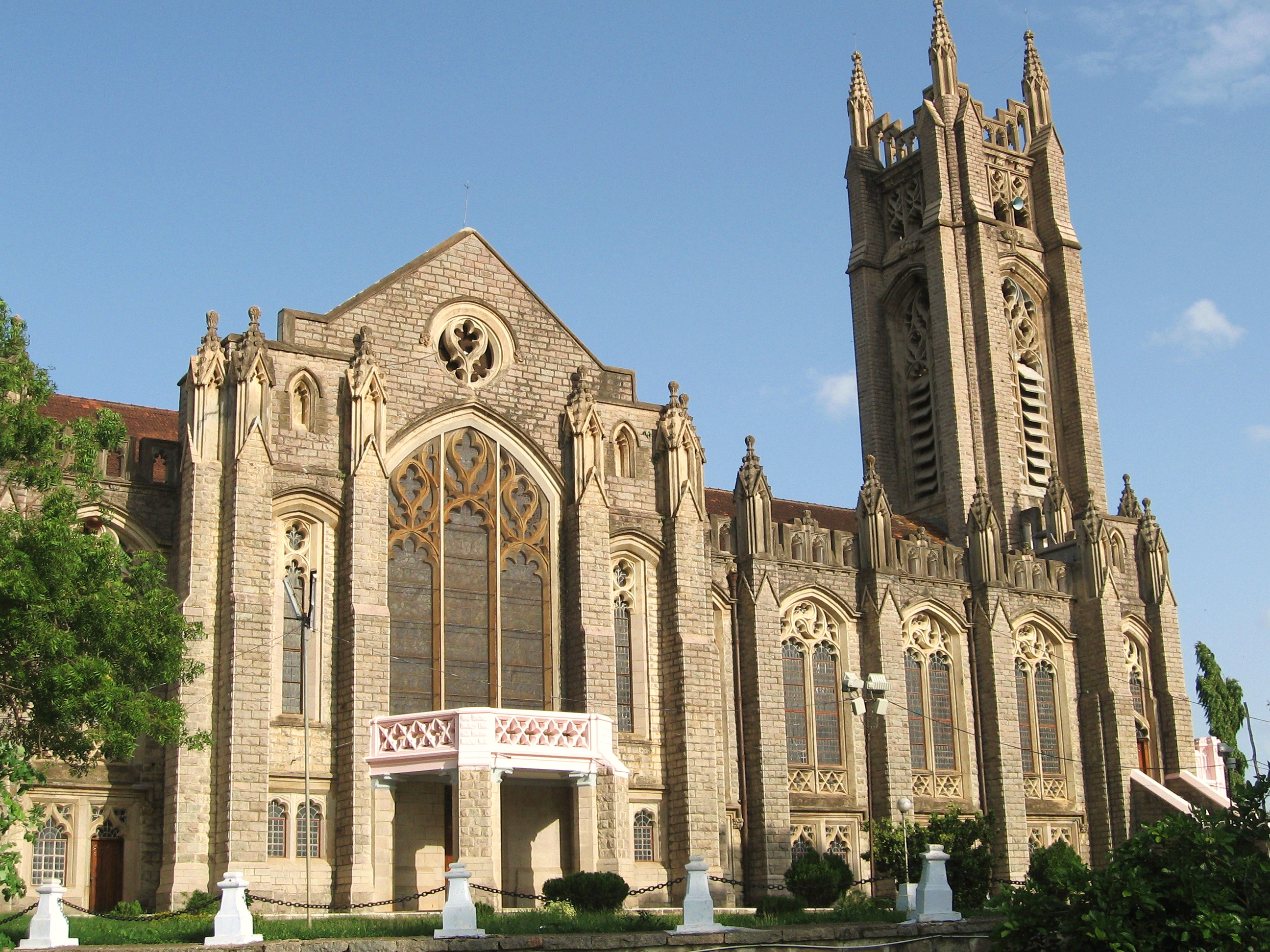
The CSI-Medak Cathedral where the Cathedra of the Bishop is located.

On completing spiritual studies in Karnataka, Solomon Raj was ordained as a Deacon on 6.10.1992 in the Church of South India Society (comprising Wesleyan Methodist, Congregational and Anglican missionary societies – SPG, WMMS, LMS, CMS, and the Church of England) by then Bishop Victor Premasagar, CSI and began his ecclesiastical ministry in the pastorates within the ecclesiastical jurisdiction of the Diocese of Medak. Subsequently, after a two-year ministry, he was ordained as a Presbyter on 5.4.1994 by the successive Bishop B. P. Sugandhar, CSI.

=== Pastoral ===
Solomon Raj as Presbyter served in all the three ecclesiastical District Church Councils of the Diocese of Medak and has been vice-chairperson of the Diocese of Medak for three terms, 2003–2007, 2007-2011 and 2013–2017.

Before assuming the Cathedra in 2016, Solomon Raj was Presbyter – in – charge at the CSI-Holy Trinity Church, Bolarum, Secunderabad and had also led the Diocese of Medak as its Vice-chairperson under the guidance and mentorship of the Systematic theologian, The Most Reverend G. Dyvasirvadam.

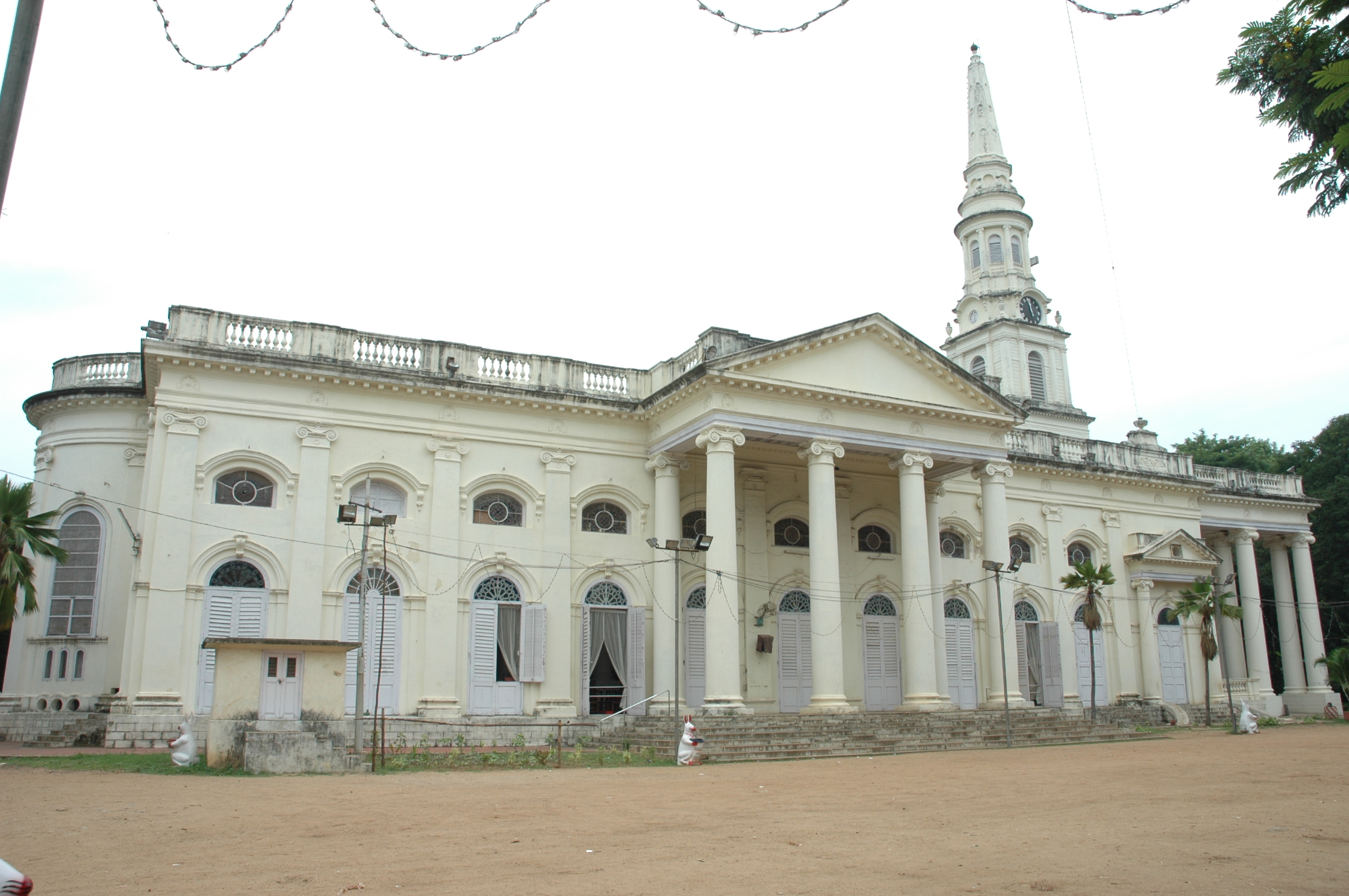
The CSI-St. George's Cathedral, Chennai where Solomon Raj was consecrated on 13.10.2016.

=== Bishopric ===
In 2012, Bishop T. S. Kanaka Prasad, CSI had to relinquish the Cathedra as per an ecclesiastical communique from the Church of South India Synod in Chennai resulting in sede vacante during which time the Medak Diocese was overseen from Chennai by the Church of South India Synod led by then Moderator and Systematic theologian, The Most Reverend G. Dyvasirvadam, CSI.

After nearly five years of ecclesiastical oversight of the Medak Diocese, the Church of South India Synod appointed A. C. Solomon Raj to shepherd the Diocese, consecrating him on Thursday, 13.10.2016 at the CSI-St. George's Cathedral, Chennai where he was principally consecrated by the Systematic theologian, G. Dyvasirvadam, CSI, then Moderator and co-consecrated by Thomas K. Oommen, then Deputy Moderator in the presence of other Bishops including The Right Reverend Sister Eggoni Pushpalalitha, CSI Order of Sisters, Bishop – in – Nandyal and The Right Reverend Daniel Thiagarajah, CSI Bishop – in – Jaffna.

The consecration of Solomon Raj in Chennai makes him the second bishop from the Diocese of Medak after Frank Whittaker, CSI to have been consecrated as Bishop at the St. George's Cathedral, Chennai and the third bishop – in Medak after H. D. L. Abraham, CSI to have been consecrated as Bishop at a Cathedral other than the Cathedral in Medak. After the bifurcation of Andhra Pradesh State in 2014 into Telangana and the residuary Andhra Pradesh, Solomon Raj is the second bishop to have been consecrated in the new Telangana State with the first bishop being The Right Reverend K. Reuben Mark, CSI of the adjoining Diocese of Karimnagar also in the new Telangana State who was consecrated on 4 May 2015 well after the formation of Telangana State.

== Ex-officio endeavours ==
=== Near-Ecumenical ===
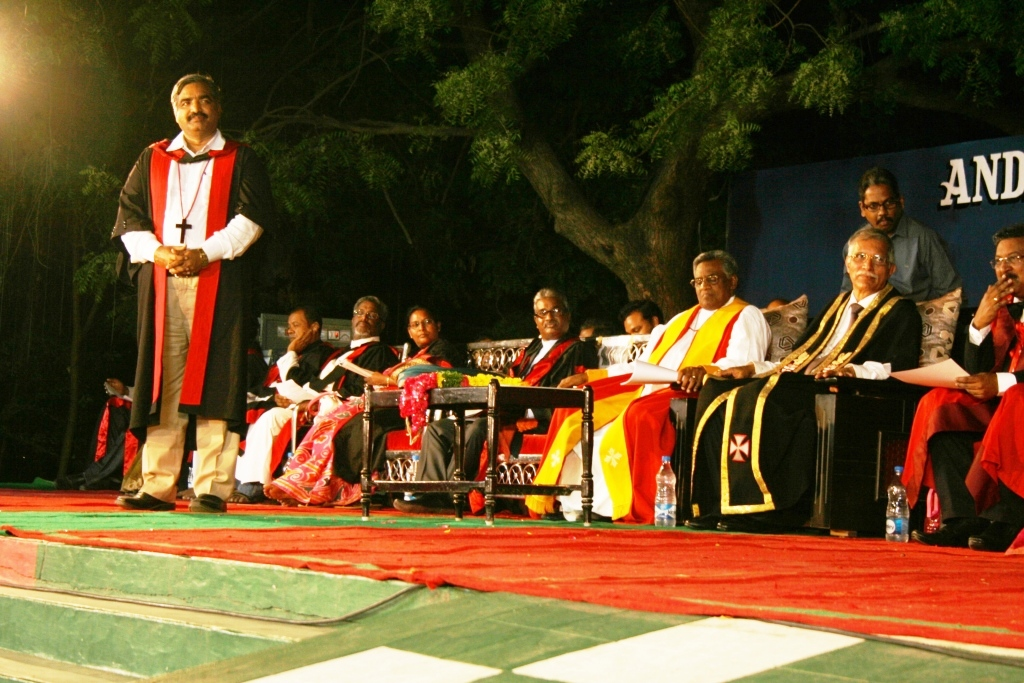
Bishop Solomon Raj in Andhra Christian Theological College

Solomon Raj has been a member of the Board of Governors representing the Diocese of Medak in the near-ecumenical Andhra Christian Theological College, Secunderabad comprising a few Protestant Societies that include the Methodists, the Lutherans, the Baptists and the Church of South India (Anglicans, Congregationalists, Wesleyans), since the present period of the Old Testament Scholars The Rev. T. Matthews Emmanuel, CBCNC and The Rev. Ch. Vasantha Rao, CSI. In early 2016 when the annual convocation of the Senate of Serampore College (University) took place in Secunderabad in the presence of the Old Testament Scholar John Sadananda, CSI the Master of the University, after a gap of nearly three and half decades with the earlier convocation having been held in Secunderabad in 1979 during the period of the Old Testament Scholars, The Rev. Victor Premasagar, CSI and The Rev. G. Babu Rao, CBCNC, the Diocese of Medak through Solomon Raj as vice-chairperson of the diocese and as member of the Board of Governors of the college had substantially contributed to the logistics ensuring the successful holding of the convocation.

=== Fully-Ecumenical ===
==== Church unity ====
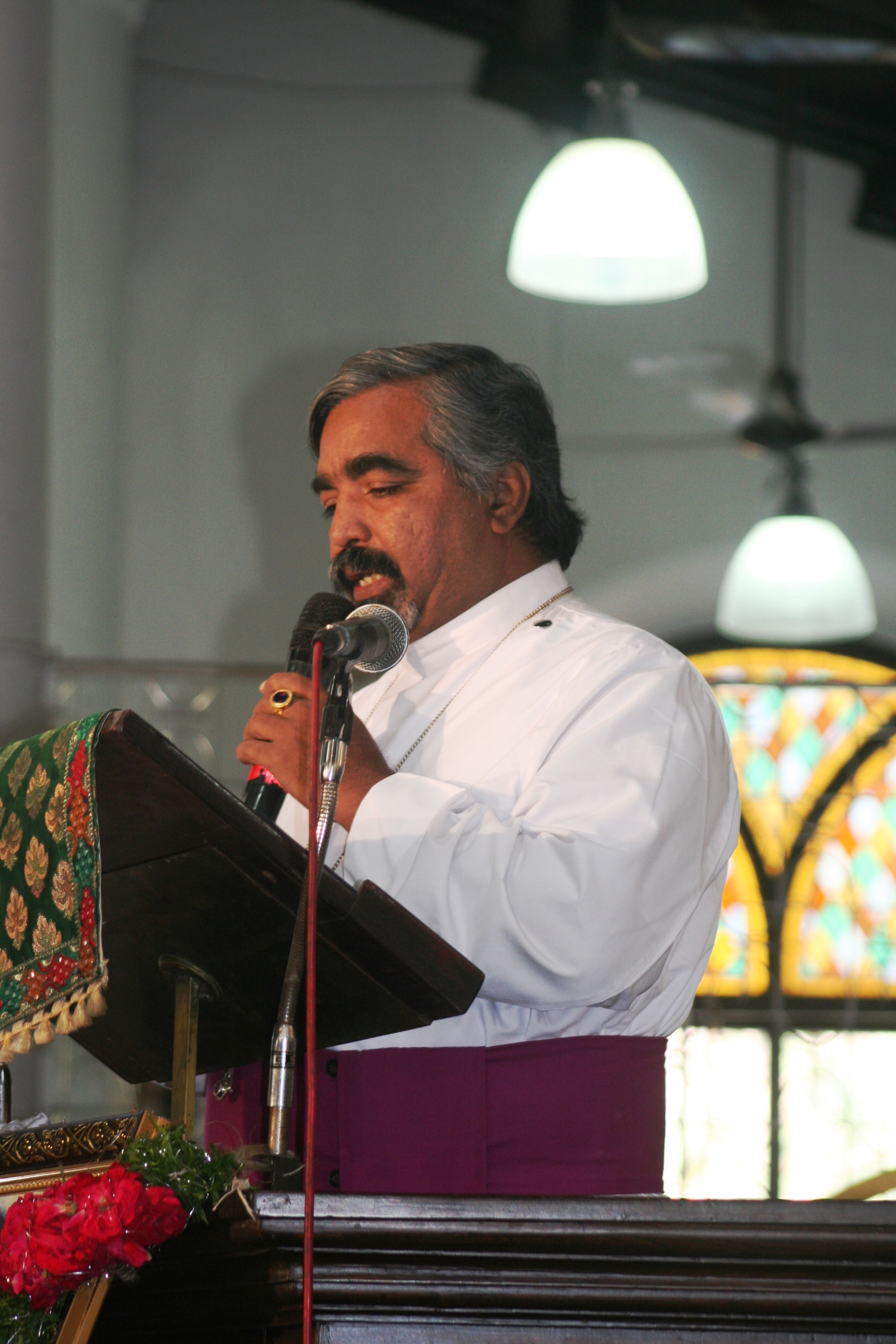
Bishop Solomon leading the faithful in Secunderabad in 2017.

The Diocese of Medak of the Protestant Church of South India Society is represented on the fully-ecumenical Andhra Pradesh and Telangana Federation of Churches where Solomon Raj as vice-chairperson and now Bishop continues to represent the Diocese of Medak in the federation consisting of the Catholic Church (Latin and Syro-Malabar rites), Indian Orthodox Church, Protestant Church, the Charismatic Church and, the small and indigenous Churches. At every periodical meeting of the federation held at the St. John's Regional Seminary (Theologiate), Solomon Raj has been active participant working towards Church unity along with fellow Clergy from the Catholic Church, The Most Reverend Doraboina Moses Prakasam, RCM, The Most Reverend Gallela Prasad, RCM, The Most Reverend Innayya Chinna Addagatla, RCM and from the Assemblies of God and other Churches. Incidentally, Solomon Raj's mentor and guide, the Systematic theologian, The Most Reverend G. Dyvasirvadam, CSI has been the President of the fully-ecumenical Andhra Pradesh and Telangana Federation of Churches.

==== Scriptural ====
The Bible Society of India Telangana Auxiliary was bifurcated from the Bible Society of India Andhra Pradesh Auxiliary and inaugurated on 2 February 2016 and takes forward the work of the Bible Society of India in translating and distributing the scriptures. The Bible Society of India has also published the complete Bible with the Deuterocanonical books making the scriptures available even to the Catholics. On 5 June 2016, Solomon Raj, as vice-chairperson of the Diocese of Medak participated in the installation mass of the new Auxiliary Secretary, The Rev. P. K. Praveen Prabhu Sudheer, CSI held at the CSI-Wesley Centenary Church in Secunderabad in the presence of the Old Testament Scholar and Bible Society of India General Secretary, M. Mani Chacko, CSI.

== Honours ==
On 8 April 2017, Solomon Raj was conferred with an honorary doctorate (D.Min.) by the Protestant Regional Theologiate, the near-Ecumenical Andhra Christian Theological College (ACTC), Secunderabad led by The Right Rev. G. Dyvasirvadam, CSI, the chairperson of the Board of Governors of ACTC and The Rev. T. Matthews Emmanuel, CBCNC, then Principal of ACTC in the presence of Bishop Emeritus John S. Sadananda, CSI, the Master of the Senate of Serampore College (University).

Other offices
Preceded by Archbishop Thumma Bala, RCM	Chairperson, Federation of Telugu Churches; 2021–present	Succeeded by Incumbent
Preceded by Position created	President, Telangana State Federation of Churches; 2021–present	Succeeded by Incumbent
Honorary titles
Preceded by Bishop T. S. Kanaka Prasad, CSI	Member, Board of Governors, Andhra Christian Theological College, Secunderabad; 2012–present	Succeeded by Incumbent
Educational offices
Preceded by Bishop K. F. Paradesi Babu, AELC	Chairperson, Board of Governors, Andhra Christian Theological College, Secunderabad; 24.6.2022–29.11.2022	Succeeded by George Cornelious, CSI
Church of South India Diocese of Medak Ecclesiastical Titles
Preceded by Bishop T. S. Kanaka Prasad, CSI	CSI-Bishop – in – Medak, Medak; 13.10.2016–	Succeeded by Incumbent
Preceded by The Rev. K. Zaccheus, CSI	Presbyter – in – Charge, CSI-Holy Trinity Church, Bolarum, Secunderabad; 2012–2016	Succeeded by The Rev. E. J. David, CSI
Preceded by The Rev. B. D. Premsagar, CSI	Presbyter – in – Charge, CSI-Garrison Wesley Church, Trimulgherry, Secunderabad; 2009–2012	Succeeded by The Rev. S. P. Vidyasagar, CSI
