= Diocese of Medak of the Church of South India =

Diocese of the Church of South India in Telangana, India

Diocese of Medak
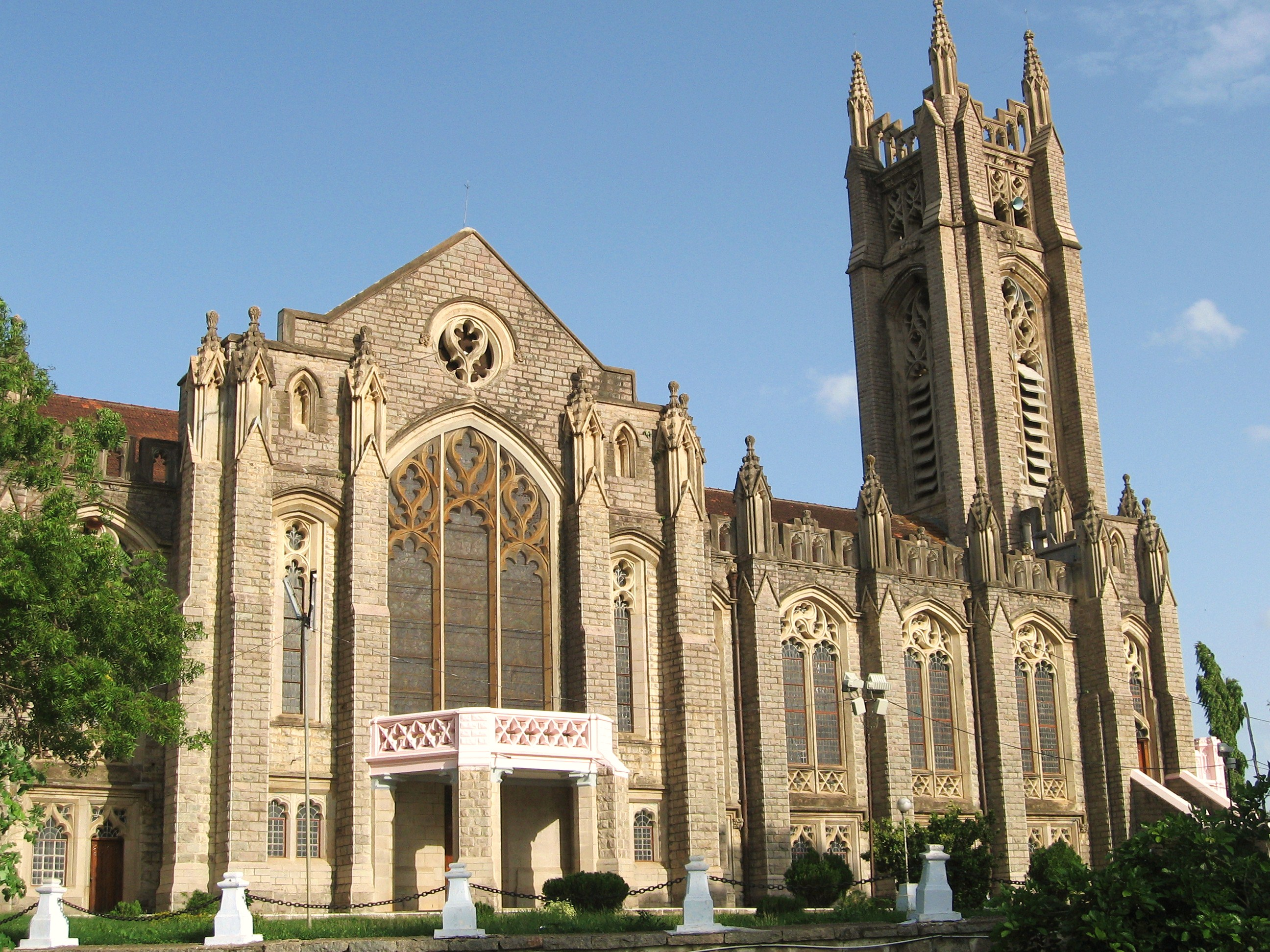

Location
- Country: India
- Territory: Telangana
- Deaneries: 3 District Church Councils (DCC) (Godavari DCC, Medak DCC, and Town DCC)
- Subdivisions: 105 pastorates
- Headquarters: Medak

Statistics
- Members: 1/3rd of a million

Information
- Denomination: Protestant
- Rite: Church of South India (A Uniting church comprising Wesleyan Methodist, Congregational, Lutheran, Calvinist and Anglican missionary societies – SPG, WMMS, LMS, Basel Mission, CMS, and the Church of England)
- Established: 3 October 1947
- Cathedral: Medak Cathedral
- Secular priests: 200
- Language: English, Hindi, Kannada, Urdu, Lambadi, Malayalam, Tamil, Telugu
- Calendar: Church of South India Liturgical calendar
- Music: Contemporary worship music

Current leadership
- Parent church: Church of South India Synod
- Patriarch: A. Dharmaraj Rasalam (Moderator)
- The Right Reverend: Moderator's Commissary (K. Padma Rao)
- Vicar General: The Reverend T. Bhaskar (Vice-Chairperson of the Diocese)
- Archdeacons: The Rev. Velupula Samuel, CSI, Chairperson, Godavari District Church Council (GDCC), The Rev. M. George Ebenezer Raju, CSI, Chairperson, Medak District Church Council (MDCC), The Rev. John Jonathan, CSI, Chairperson, Town District Church Council (TDCC)

Website
- www.csimedakdiocese.org

The Diocese of Medak is one of the prominent dioceses in the Church of South India, a united Protestant church with its headquarters in Medak comprising nearly 200 Presbyters ministering to Telugu, Lambadi, Tamil, Kannada, Malayalam, Hindustani (Hindi and Urdu), English and other linguistic groups numbering nearly 1/3rd> of a million spread over 105 pastorates and administered through 3 District Church Councils (DCC), namely, the Town DCC, the Medak DCC and the Godavari DCC geographically located in the erstwhile civil districts of Adilabad, Nizamabad, Medak, Rangareddy, Hyderabad and Mahboobnagar in Telangana.

== History ==
=== Christianity in India ===
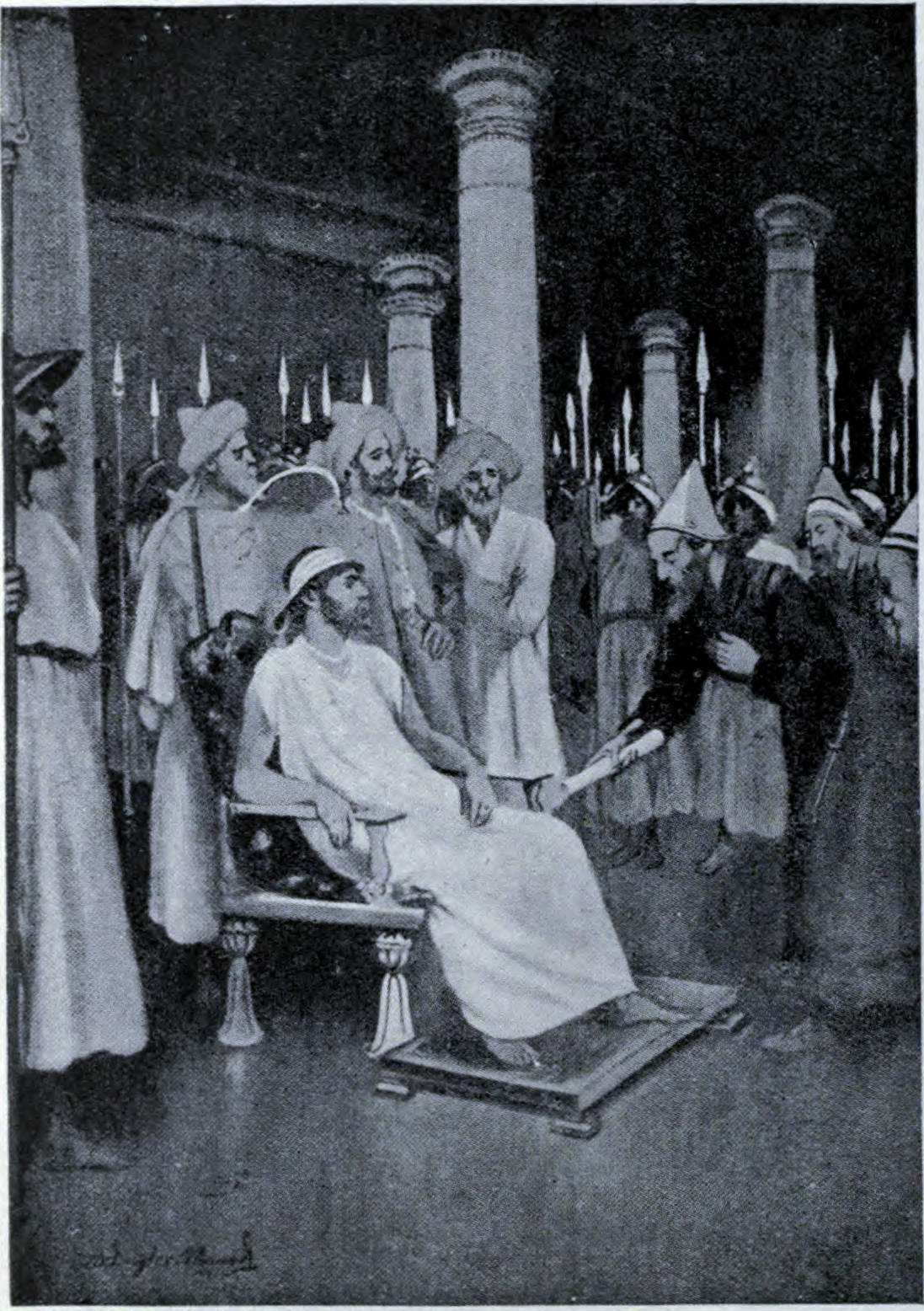
King Gondophares receives a letter from St. Thomas in Gujarat.

Saint Bartholomew, one of the Twelve Apostles landed in Maharashtra and began his mission in Kalyan and was followed by Saint Thomas who landed in Gujarat during the reign of King Gondophares and initiated the Gospel in parts of Bharuch and Taxila before traveling southward to Kerala in 52 A.D. where he won many converts and established many churches, eventually traveling to Tamil Nadu where he was martyred in 72 A.D. After centuries of inactivity, the missions were again revived with the arrival of Saint Francis Xavier in 1542 followed by Robert de Nobili in 1605 who arrived in Goa on the western coast. The first Protestant missionaries arrived in 1706 with Bartholomäus Ziegenbalg and Heinrich Plütschau of the Lutheran Missions who landed at Tranquebar on the eastern coast of Tamil Nadu. However, the modern missions began to take shape only with the arrival of the Baptist Missions in 1793 led by William Carey, the Father of the Modern Missionary Movement.

It was with this background that Jawaharlal Nehru, the first Prime Minister of India remarked in a parliamentary debate in 1955 in the Lok Sabha that,

"Christianity in India is as old as Christianity itself."

=== Christianity in Telangana ===
Catholic missionaries first set foot in the erstwhile Hyderabad State in 1535 during the sixteenth century followed by the American Methodist missions in 1873, the Baptist missions in 1875, the Mennonite Brethren missions then followed by the Wesleyan Methodist missions in 1878 during the nineteenth century.

=== The beginnings of the church ===
Once the Wesleyan Methodist Missionary Society set foot in the erstwhile Hyderabad State in 1878, the missionaries led by Henry Little, William Burgess and the Indian Evangelist Benjamin Wesley who pioneered the spread of the Gospel and helped in establishing of churches in areas northward of Hyderabad City winning of new converts to the fold of Christianity.

Meanwhile, efforts were made by visionary Pastors to form the Church of South India for which missionary societies came forward for negotiations who included Anglicans, Baptists, Congregationalists, Lutherans, and Wesleyan Methodists. However, the talks towards Church Union did not go well with the laymen hailing from the Baptists and the Lutherans in spite of efforts by their Clergy led by Professor Muthyala Theophilus, CBCNC and William Powlas Peery, AELC to join the Church of South India. Meanwhile in 1923, the Wesleyan Methodist Missionary Society participated in the negotiations towards Church union and formally agreed to join the Church of South India in 1947 and Frank Whittaker became the first Bishop of the Diocese of Medak.

=== The CSI and aftermath ===
From 1947 onward, the church came under the Church of South India overseen by a Bishop residing in Medak, the ecclesiastical headquarters of the Diocese of Medak and was overseen by Bishops beginning with Frank Whittaker. The Bishops used to appoint Pastors to lead the congregations in Christian love and faith so that the Christians lead selfless lives and set example for others. The Clergy consisted of Pastors who had theological grounding under able scholars in seminaries either at the Andhra Christian Theological College or at the United Theological College, Bangalore. The church also had visiting preachers from the nearby seminary, the Andhra Christian Theological College as well as other non-CSI churches in the city.

== Ministerial formation ==
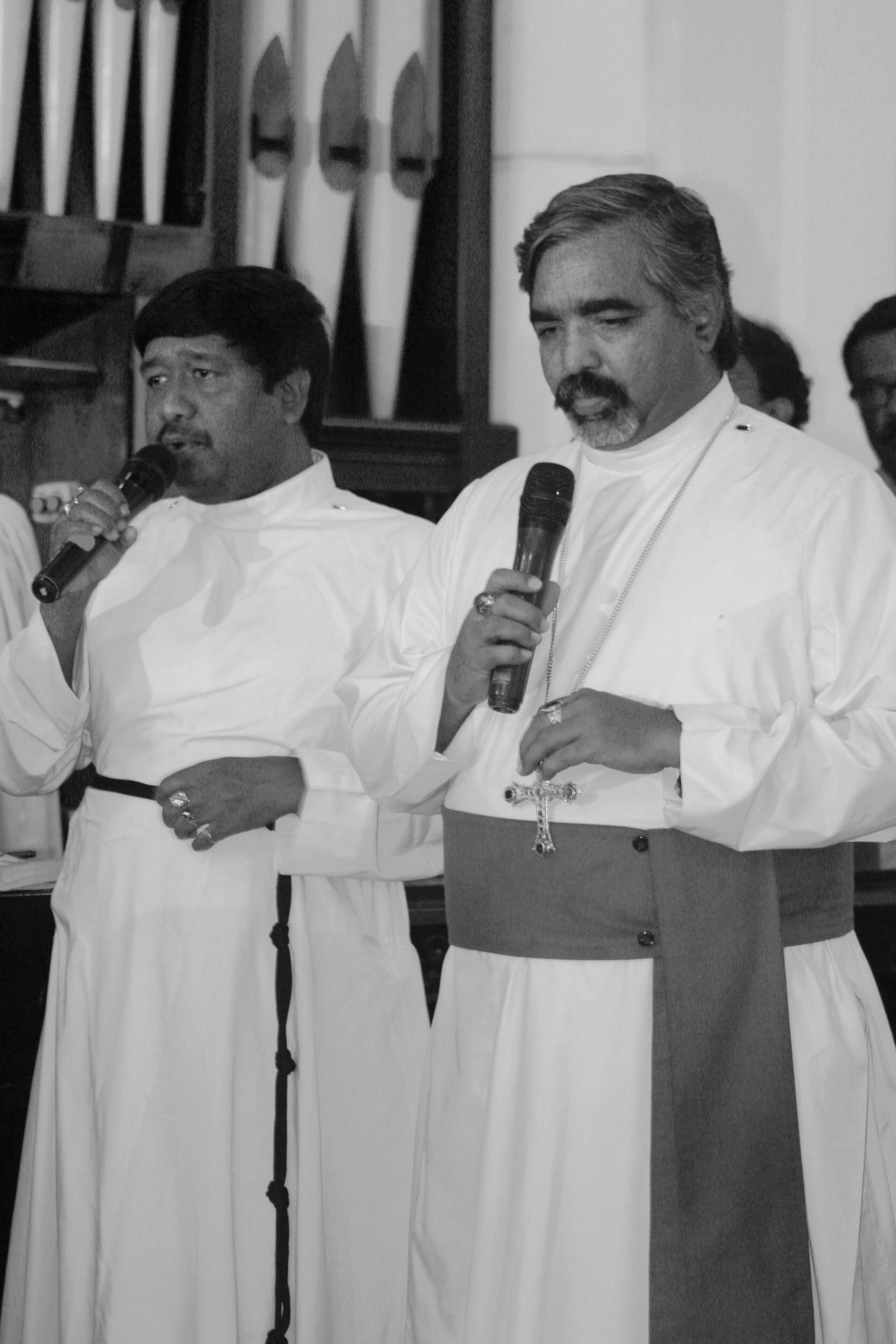
Bishop Solomon Raj (right) and Rev. T. Bhasker (left), Vice-Chairman of the Diocese.

The Ministerial Secretary of the Diocese of Medak acts as the Vocation Promoter and for those discerning their avocation towards priesthood, the Diocese of Medak through its Ministerial Secretary examines candidates to determine their preparedness for the priestly vocation at varying points of time. First, candidates are admitted to the Diocese of Medak and attached with a Priest in congregations and after a year or two they are sent for ministerial formation to a seminary affiliated to the Senate of Serampore College (University). Presently, the Diocese of Medak divides candidates between the Andhra Christian Theological College, Secunderabad and to the United Theological College, Bangalore.

It was in Medak that the first seminary was established prior to 1947. Incidentally, this College moved over to Dornakal and became the Andhra Union Theological College which later in 1964 joined hands with the Anglicans, Baptists, Congregationalists, Lutherans, Methodists and Wesleyan Methodists to form the Andhra Christian Theological College, originally located in Rajahmundry and moved to Secunderabad in 1972. The Diocese is also represented in the United Theological College, Bangalore which was established in 1910.

The Diocese of Medak through its scholarly Clergy who have been involved in ministerial formation both at the Andhra Christian Theological College, Secunderabad and at the United Theological College, Bangalore. Some of its Clergy who have been sent on lien to teach in such spiritual formation centres include,

Spiritual Formators hailing from the Diocese of Medak
Name of the Presbyter	Specialization	Seminary	Year's taught
Frank Whittaker	Theology	Andhra Union Theological College, Dornakal	1960-61
Eric J. Lott	Religions	Andhra Union Theological College, Dornakal, Andhra Christian Theological College, Rajahmundry/Secunderabad and United Theological College, Bangalore	1962-64, 1964–76, 1977–88
M. Vidyanandam	Old Testament	Andhra Christian Theological College, Rajahmundry	1964-66
P. Victor Premasagar	Old Testament	Andhra Union Theological College, Dornakal and Andhra Christian Theological College, Rajahmundry/Secunderabad	1964-66, 1966–80
R. Yesurathnam	Systematic theology	Andhra Christian Theological College, Secunderabad	1973-01
P. Surya Prakash	New Testament and Homiletics	United Theological College, Bangalore	1991-00
Ch. Vasantha Rao	Old Testament	Andhra Christian Theological College, Secunderabad and United Theological College, Bangalore	1994-17, 2017-present
M. Sundar	New Testament	Andhra Christian Theological College, Secunderabad	2007-14
M. Rajeshwar Solomon	Christian ministry	Andhra Christian Theological College, Secunderabad	2019-present
M. Gnanak Gerhardson	Christian theology	Andhra Christian Theological College, Secunderabad	2021-present
B. J. Moses Shanthi Kumar	Christian theology	Andhra Christian Theological College, Secunderabad	2017-present

== Diocese administrators ==
The Bishops that have led the Diocese of Medak were notable and exemplary and having focused on the objective of the Mission and Evangelism as shown through the Gospels. The lives of the Bishops have been documented by Church historians and available in book form include,

- Rajaiah David Paul, The First Decade: An Account of the Church of South India, published by the Christian Literature Society, Chennai, 1958,
- Rajaiah David Paul, Ecumenism in action: a historical survey of the Church of South India, published by the Christian Literature Society, Chennai, 1972,
- K. M. George, Church of South India: Life in Union, 1947-1997, Jointly published by Indian Society for Promoting Christian Knowledge, New Delhi and Christava Sahitya Samithi, Tiruvalla, 1999,

From^{[A]}	Until^{[B]}	Incumbent	Notes (earned theological credentials)
27.9.1947	Mar 1960	Frank Whittaker	M.A. (Cambridge)
Apr 1960	31.10.1960	See vacant (overseen by the Church of South India Synod: H. Sumitra)	
1.11.1960	1967	Eber Priestley	B.A. (Birmingham)
1967	1968	See vacant (overseen by the Church of South India Synod: P. Solomon)	
3.2.1969	1975	H. D. L. Abraham	B.D. (Serampore)
1975	1976	See vacant (overseen by the Church of South India Synod: N. D. Ananda Rao Samuel)	
1976	1981	B. G. Prasada Rao	B.D. (Serampore), M.Th. (Serampore)
1981	1983	See vacant (overseen by the Church of South India Synod: Solomon Doraiswamy and I. Jesudason)	
1983	1992	P. Victor Premasagar	B.D. (Serampore), M.A. (Cambridge), Ph.D. (St Andrews)
1992	Aug 1993	See vacant (overseen by the Church of South India Synod: Ryder Devapriam)	
Sep 1993	Sep 2008	B. P. Sugandhar	B.D. (Serampore)
Sep 2008	16.8.2009	See vacant (overseen by the Church of South India Synod: P. Surya Prakash and J. W. Gladstone)	
17.8.2009	2012	T. S. Kanaka Prasad	B.Th. (Serampore), B.D. (Serampore)
2012	11.10.2016	See vacant (overseen by the Church of South India Synod: G. Dyvasirvadam)	
12.10.2016	29.11.2022	A. C. Solomon Raj	B.D. (Serampore), M.Th. (Serampore)
29.11.2022	Present	See vacant (overseen by the Church of South India Synod: K. Padma Rao)	

- A note on Assistant Bishop - in - Medak (Bishop Bunyan Joseph)

During the 1950s, the Diocese accommodated Bishop Bunyan Joseph of the erstwhile Anantapur-Kurnool Diocese which had since been integrated into Rayalaseema Diocese. He was Assistant Bishop - in - Medak and worked together with Frank Whittaker, Eber Priestley, B. G. Prasada Rao and others. Bunyan Joseph also served as Presbyter - in - Charge at the CSI-Church of St. John the Baptist, Secunderabad during 1956-57 and 1960-61 until he finally retired in October 1963.

== Churches ==
Churches under the ecclesiastical jurisdiction of the Diocese of Medak
Church	Location	Founding Year	Founding Mission
CSI- Church of St. the Baptist	Secunderabad	1813	Church of England (CoE)
CSI-Garrison Wesley Church	Secunderabad	1881	Wesleyan Methodist Missionary Society (WMMS)
CSI-Holy Trinity Church	Secunderabad	1847	Church of England (CoE)
CSI-St. George's Church	Hyderabad	1844	Church Missionary Society (CMS)
CSI-Christ Church	Hyderabad	1868	Society for the Propagation of the Gospel (SPG)
CSI-All Saints Church	Secunderabad	1860	Church of England (CoE)
CSI-Medak Cathedral	Medak	1924	Wesleyan Methodist Missionary Society (WMMS)
CSI- St. Luke's Hindustani Church	Hyderabad	1919	Church Missionary Society (CMS)
CSI - Wesley Tamil Church	Secunderabad	1880	Scottish Presbyterian Mission
