= List of churches in Secunderabad and Hyderabad =

The twin cities of Hyderabad and Secunderabad in India have many churches of architectural value which were primarily built under British colonial rule, during the nineteenth and the early twentieth centuries. Although much smaller in size compared to Hyderabad, Secunderabad has far more churches than its twin, as a result of its being a British Cantonment under direct British rule, from its founding in 1806 to 1947. Most of the prominent churches in the twin cities are concentrated in and around the historic Clock Tower and Abids areas. New and local churches are being established in and around the Twin cities.

Under the discipline of Church history these Churches are classified as,

- Roman Catholic Churches,
- Oriental Orthodox Churches,
- Protestant Churches,
- New and Indigenous Churches

== Roman Catholic Churches ==
Church name	Location	Rite	Address	Website	Built
St. Michael's Catholic Church	Hyderabad	Latin rite	Tolichowki	www.stmichaelsgolconda.in	1978
St. Alphonsa Syro Malabar Cathedral	Hyderabad	Syro-Malabar Rite	Kukatpally	www.stalphonsasyromalabarcathedralhyd.com	2017
St. Jude's Syro Malabar Catholic Church	Hyderabad	Syro-Malabar Rite	Ameenpur, BHEL		2016
St. Mary's Syro Malabar Catholic Church and Bishop House of Shamshabad Diocese	Hyderabad	Syro-Malabar Rite	Balapur		2017
Sacred Heart Church	Secunderabad	Latin rite	South Lallaguda		
Shrine Of Our Lady Of Health	Hyderabad	Latin rite	Khairatabad		
St. Anthony's Church	Secunderabad	Latin rite	Mettuguda		1925
St. Joseph's Church	Secunderabad	Latin rite	Moula-ali		
St. Anthony's Church	Secunderabad	Latin rite	Venkatapuram		1998
Mother Mary Malankara Catholic Church	Secunderabad	Syro-Malankara Rite	West Marredpally		
St. Joseph's Malankara Catholic Church	Secunderabad	Syro-Malankara Rite	Jeedimetla		
St. Mary's Syro Malabar Catholic Church	Hyderabad	Syro-Malabar Rite	Bowenpally		
Infant Jesus Syro Malabar Catholic Church	Secunderabad	Syro-Malabar Rite	Regimental Bazar		
Immaculate Conception Church	Hyderabad	Latin rite	Vivekananda Nagar, KPHB		

== Oriental Orthodox Churches ==
Church name	Location	Division	Address	Website	Built
MOSC-St. Andrew's Syrian Orthodox Valliyapally Church	Secunderabad	Malankara	West Marredpally		
MOSC-St. George Syrian Orthodox Church	Hyderabad	Malankara	Jeedimetla		
MOSC-St. Mary's Syrian Orthodox Church,	Hyderabad	Malankara	Ramachandrapuram		1986
MJSOC-St George's Jacobite Syrian Orthodox Church	Secunderabad	Jacobite	Mettuguda		
MJSOC-St George's Jacobite Syrian Orthodox Church	Hyderabad	Jacobite	Nagaram		
MOSC-St. Gregorios Syrian Orthodox Cathedral	Hyderabad	Malankara	Gandhinagar		
MMTSC-Ascension Mar Thoma Syrian Church	Hyderabad	Mar Thoma	RTC x Roads		
MMTSC-Bethel Mar Thoma Syrian Church	Hyderabad	Mar Thoma	Neredmet		
MMTSC-St. Thomas Mar Thoma Syrian Church	Hyderabad	Mar Thoma	Ramachandrapuram	website	
MMTSC-Gulberga Mar Thoma Congregation	Hyderabad	Mar Thoma	Chandanagar		
MMTSC-Mar Thoma Syrian Church (Under St Andrews Church Society)	Secunderabad	Mar Thoma	West Marredpally		

== Protestant Churches ==
Church name	Location	Denomination	Address	Website	Built
STBC-Centenary Baptist Church	Secunderabad	Baptist	Clock Tower		1875
STBC-Kukatpally Baptist Church	Hyderabad	Baptist	Kukatpally		1985
STBC-Sanathnagar Baptist Church	Hyderabad	Baptist	Czech Colony		
STBC-Narayanaguda Baptist Church	Hyderabad	Baptist	Narayanaguda		1969
STBC-Baptist Church Dilsukhnagar	Hyderabad	Baptist	Dilsukhnagar		1989
STBC-Tarnaka Baptist Church	Secunderabad	Baptist	Vijayapuri		
CBCNC-Toli Chowki Baptist Church	Hyderabad	Baptist	Toli Chowki		
MCI-Centenary Methodist Church and Chapel	Hyderabad	Methodist	Abids		1817
MCI-Millennium Methodist Church	Secunderabad	Methodist	Clock Tower		1882
SPG-St. Thomas S.P.G. Church	Secunderabad	SPG	St. Mary’s Road		1852
CSI-All Saints Church	Secunderabad	Uniting	Trimulgherry		1947
CSI-Christ Church, South Lallaguda	Secunderabad	Uniting	South Lallaguda		
CSI-St. Mark's Church	Secunderabad	Uniting	Mettuguda		
CSI-Garrison Wesley Church	Secunderabad	Uniting	Trimulgherry		1853
CSI-Holy Trinity Church	Secunderabad	Uniting	Bolarum		1847
CSI-Malayalam Church	Secunderabad	Uniting	Sindhi Colony		
CSI-St. George's Church	Hyderabad	Uniting	Abids		1844
CSI-Church of St. John the Baptist	Secunderabad	Uniting	West Marredpally		1813
CSI-Christ Church, Ramkote	Hyderabad	Uniting	Ramkote		1869
CSI-Wesley Church	Secunderabad	Uniting	Clock Tower		1916
CMBCI-Bethel Church	Hyderabad	Mennonite	Golconda x Roads		
CMBCI-Bethlehem Church	Hyderabad	Mennonite	Malakpet		
STECI-St. Thomas Evangelical Church	Secunderabad	STECI	Nacharam		

== New and Indigenous Churches ==
Church name	Location	Category	Address	Website	Built
Adonai Fellowship Center	Hyderabad	Indigenous	Jubilee Hills		
Fusion Church	Hyderabad	Indigenous	Madhapur		2006
GSCI Aradhana Hindi Kalisiya	Secunderabad	Indigenous	Jeedimetla		
Heavenly Feast Church	Secunderabad	Indigenous	Clock Tower		
Hope Unlimited Church India	Hyderabad	New	Jubilee Hills		
Shekinah Christian Assembly	Secunderabad	Indigenous	Alwal		1984
House Church	Secunderabad	Indigenous			
Word of God Church	Hyderabad	Indigenous	Dammaiguda		
Word Power Ministries	Hyderabad	Indigenous	LB Nagar		
AG-New Life Assembly of God Church	Kompally	New	Medchal Road, Kompally		
AG-Trinity Assembly of God Church	Secunderabad	New			
Hebron Fellowship	Hyderabad	Indigenous	Golconda X Roads		
Life Way Church	Secunderabad	Indigenous	Begumpet		
Sharon Church India	Secunderabad	Indigenous	Nacharam		
Agape Full Gospel Church	Hyderabad	Indigenous	Nizampeta		
Resurrection Power of Jesus Christ Ministries Church	Hyderabad	Indigenous	Suraram		
Grace Communion Church	Secunderabad	indigenous	Trimulgherry	www.gcind.org	1968
