= CSI Garrison Wesley Church =

Coordinates: 17.4788°N 78.5149°E

CSI-Garrison Wesley Church
- CSI-Garrison Wesley Church
- Location: Secunderabad
- Country: India
- Denomination: Church of South India (A Uniting church comprising Wesleyan Methodist, Congregational, Lutheran, Calvinist and Anglican missionary societies – SPG, WMMS, LMS, Basel Mission, CMS, and the Church of England)
- Previous denomination: Wesleyan Methodist
- Churchmanship: Low church
- Website: www.csigarrisonwesley.com

History
- Status: Church
- Founded: 1881; 145 years ago
- Founder: British Indian Army troops who later handed over the edifice to the Wesleyan Methodist Missionary Society (WMMS)

Architecture
- Functional status: Active
- Heritage designation: INTACH Award
- Designated: 2015
- Architectural type: Chapel
- Style: Carpenter Gothic
- Years built: 1853
- Completed: 1881
- Construction cost: INR 10 million (1 crore) (cost of renovation)

Specifications
- Materials: Lime and mortar

Administration
- Division: Trumulgherry Pastorate
- District: Town DCC
- Diocese: Diocese of Medak

Clergy
- Bishop(s): The Right Reverend A. C. Solomon Raj, CSI

CSI-Garrison Wesley Church (built in 1853) located in Trimulgherry is among the oldest churches in Secunderabad under the auspices of the Protestant Church of South India (CSI) within the ecclesiastical jurisdiction of the Diocese of Medak. Situated in Lal Bazar civilian area of the Secunderabad Cantonment, the CSI-Garrison Wesley Church is in near vicinity of the Military College of Electronics and Mechanical Engineering (MCEME), and the church has continued to attract not only its regular worshipers but also the new visitors from the nearby military stations of the Indian Army and the Indian Air Force through its regular Sunday Mass as well as its annual Good Friday, Easter and Christmas programmes.

Though the Sunday Mass was begun initially in accordance with the Wesleyan Methodist traditions since the beginnings in 1881, it now follows the Church of South India liturgy as the Wesleyan Methodist Missionary Society (WMMS), the co-founders of the church, had unionized itself into the Church of South India that was formed on 27 September 1947 at CSI–St. George's Cathedral, Chennai. Wesleyan Methodists form a substantial majority of the parishioners of the Diocese of Medak, whereas Anglicans form a very small minority; together they regard Medak Cathedral as theirs and look to their bishop for divine leadership.

== Renovation and rededication ==
=== Renovation ===
Since the edifice had been standing for more than 150 years, efforts were initiated in 2013 during the then Presbyter-in-charge Pastor, The Reverend S. P. Vidyasagar to raise awareness about the aging rafters and garner majority opinion from the members of the church who stood for restoration of the church in lieu of demolition and reconstruction of a new edifice. The Pastorate Secretary Mr. D. Sudesh Kumar, inspired the church to raise contributions in order to restore the edifice and willing members then responded by making significant contributions to take up the restoration works at a cost of Indian Rupees 10 million (1 crore), entrusting the work to a Tamil Nadu restoration architect M/s. APTSORBH, Mr. Rajan Proprietor.

=== Rededication ===
After the efforts put in by the Pastorate Committee for nearly two years, the newly restored edifice was rededicated on 21 December 2014 by The Most Reverend G. Dyvasirvadam who by then had become Moderator of the Church of South India Synod which was directly overseeing the ecclesiastical affairs of the Diocese of Medak. The Congregation recognizes the Initiative by Rev. S.P. Vidyasagar and the pastorate Committee led by Mr. D. Sudesh Kumar. Rev. S.P. Vidyasagar who retired in 2014 and subsequently Rev. Jyothy was posted at CSI Garrison Wesley Church, the Rededication Mass was witnessed by the entire Congregation with a procession in the Lalbazaar area in the presence of then Vice Chairman, Rev. A. C. Solomon Raj, who is now the Bishop in Medak.

=== Recognition ===
In 2015, the Indian National Trust for Art and Cultural Heritage awarded its Heritage Award to six establishments, one of which was the CSI-Garrison Wesley Church, recognizing the efforts put in for renovating and restoring the church.

== History ==
The Wesleyan Methodist Missionary Society set foot in the erstwhile Hyderabad State in 1878, the missionaries led by Henry Little, William Burgess and the Indian Evangelist Benjamin Wesley who pioneered the spread of the Gospel and helped in establishing of churches in areas northward of Hyderabad winning of new converts to the fold of Christianity.

While this was so, the British Indian Army had stationed itself in Secunderabad by 1798 itself and there were already Christians of British origin and among them were Wesleyan Methodists who had already begun worshiping following the Wesleyan Methodists traditions and it was the military troops who were led by a Presbyter had laid a cornerstone of the church in 1853.

== Clergy ==
=== Present ===
The present pastor is Rev. Dr. Prof. M. Rajeshwar Solomon, CSI who has been designated as the Presbyter-in-Charge of the CSI-Garrison Wesley Church.

=== Past (ascending) ===
- Rev. Dr. Prof. M. Rajeshwar Solomon, CSI
- The Reverend Jyothy, CSI
- The Reverend S. P. Vidyasagar, CSI
- The Reverend A. C. Solomon Raj, CSI
- The Reverend B. D. Premsagar, CSI
