= Holy Trinity Church, Bolarum =

Protestant church in Telangana, India

CSI-Holy Trinity Church
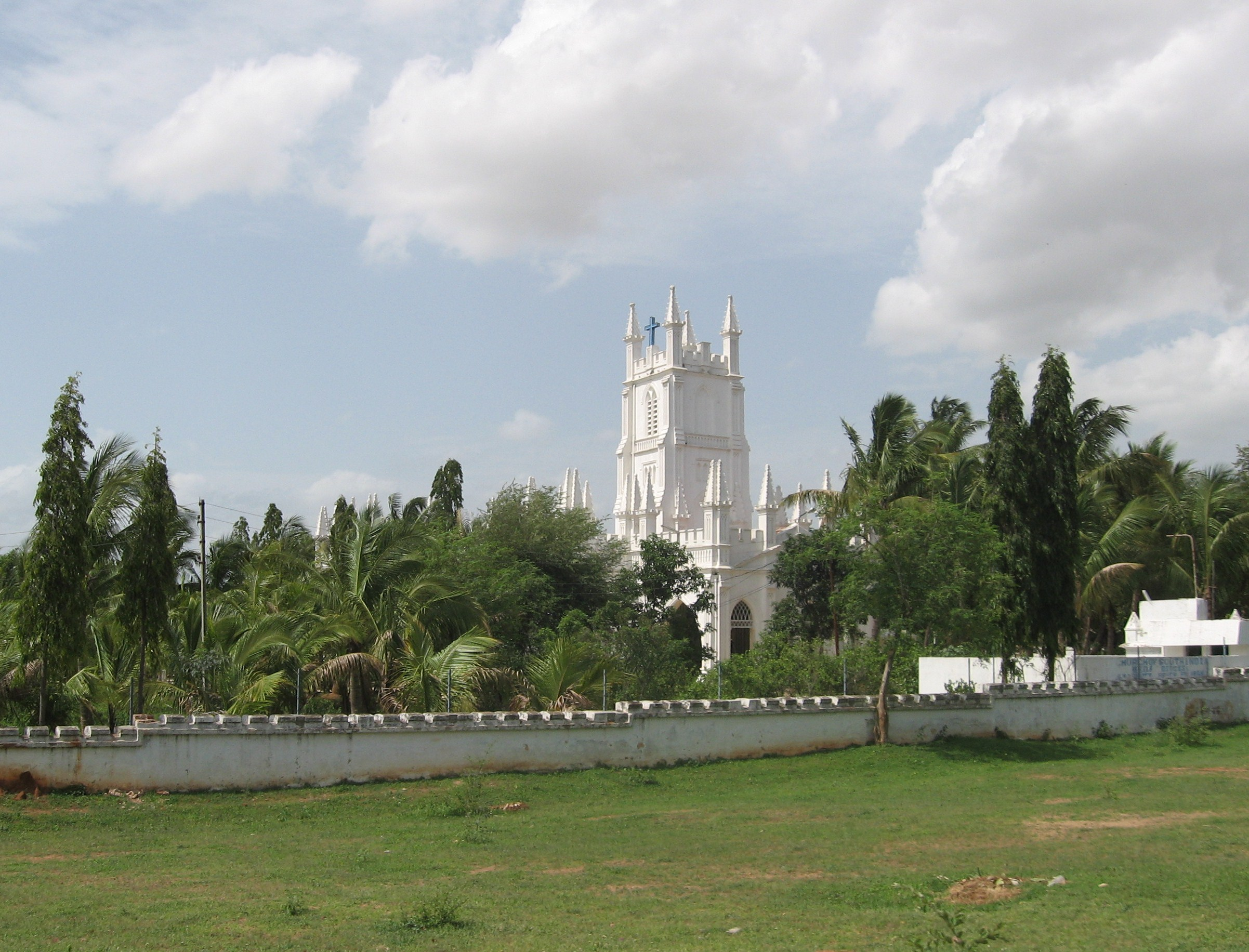
- CSI-Holy Trinity Church, Bolarum was commissioned by Queen Victoria
- CSI-Holy Trinity Church
- 17°31′0.07″N 78°31′24.99″E
- Country: India
- Denomination: Church of South India (A Uniting church comprising Wesleyan Methodist, Congregational, Lutheran, Calvinist and Anglican missionary societies – SPG, WMMS, LMS, Basel Mission, CMS, and the Church of England)
- Churchmanship: Low church

History
- Dedication: Holy Trinity

Administration
- Province: Secunderabad
- Diocese: Diocese of Medak

Clergy
- Bishop: The Right Reverend A. C. Solomon Raj
- Priest: Rev. Charles Wesley

CSI-Holy Trinity Church is a church under the auspices of the Protestant Church of South India, a uniting Church. It is located in the Bolarum locality of Secunderabad Cantonment.

== History ==
Construction of the church, in 1847, was personally funded by Queen Victoria, on land donated by the Nizam of Hyderabad. It was initially an Anglican church, and a place of worship for British army officers and other Indian Christian families. The church was built by Her Majesty Queen Victoria in the year 1847 out of her own purse. Following an Anglican tradition the church was the place of worship for the then lived British army officers and families. The land for this historic church was donated by the Nizam's Govt. when General Frazer was the resident of Hyderabad. The interior of the church is adorned by memorial tablets of British Army officers, erected by their loved ones, who died during their tenure in the Hyderabad contingent. One can still see the original pews, which despite the passage of time have retained their sheen. The stained glass at the altar (erected in 1904), the pulpit, and the bell are all in their original eloquence, reflecting an era gone by. There are 44 tablets adorning the church interior, erected by the loved ones of those who died. According to the records, 21 regiments were stationed at Secunderabad during 1847-1947 and were a part of the worship. The cemetery next door back dates to the 18th century, and reflects the history and the memorial of British Officers and their loved ones. The oldest grave belongs to John Alexander, a British Army Officer of Hyderabad Contingent, who died on 7 April 1851. The cemetery is active and still being used by the congregation to bury their dear ones.

== Formation of the Church of South India ==
The Church of South India is a union of many Protestant Christian churches spread throughout South India. It is the largest Protestant church in India and second largest denomination in terms of size (after the Catholic Church in India). It is one of the four United Churches in the Anglican Communion. The inspiration for this union was born out of ecumenism inspired by the self-pronouncing words of Jesus Christ as found in Gospel of John 17:21. The Church of South India was inaugurated on 27 September 1947 at St. George's Cathedral, Madras (Chennai). It was formed from the union of Anglican, Methodist, Congregational, Presbyterian, and Reformed churches in South India. Later in the 1990s, a small number of Baptist and Pentecostal churches joined the movement. The creation of the Church of South India was a historic event in Christendom where, for the first time, churches with Episcopal and non-Episcopal traditions decided to form a union. The Church of South India was one of the earliest forms of the United and Uniting Church.

== Architecture ==
The church is medium-sized, and in the Victorian Gothic style. The stained glass windows are similar to those of country churches in England. The pews in the church are original, as are the stained glass at the altar, the pulpit and the bell. Tablets on the walls commemorate the deaths of parishioners, especially British Army officers and their families. The adjacent cemetery contains graves dating from 1851. It was built in classic European architecture by a member of British Royal family. Then a place of worship for British Army officers and families, it now serves about 370 families covering roughly more than 15 localities and 6 villages.

== Pipe organ ==
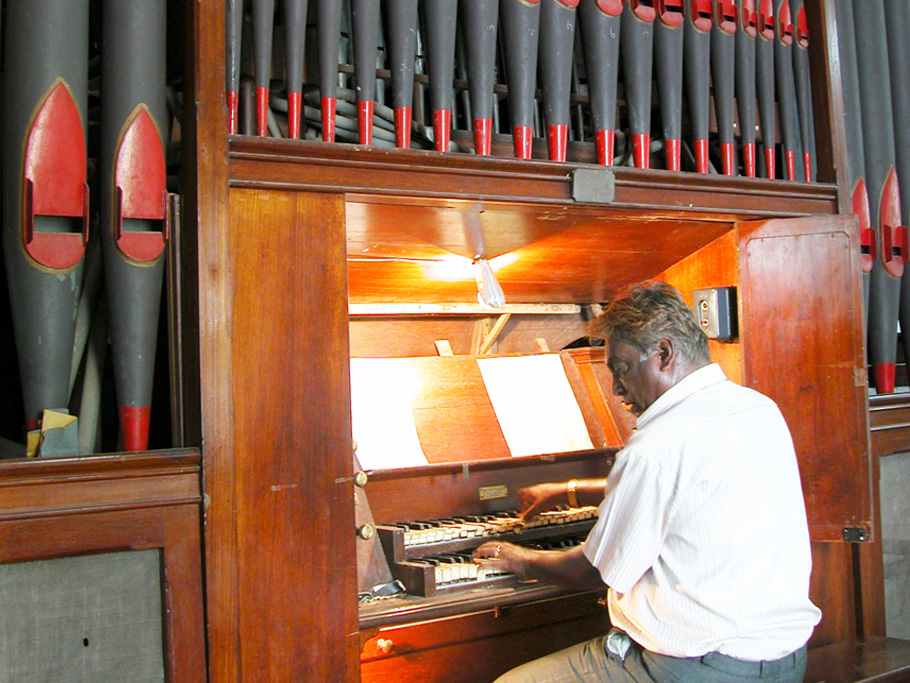

The greatest jewel adorning the church altars, the pipe organ, one can hear the magical sounds of nature every Sunday in the worship service. The pipe organ was built by Misquith & Co. Organ Builders, a company from Madras. Erected by public subscription in May 1903, the pipe organ has retained its original melody and music. Consisting of swell organ, great organ and the pedals, it has a total of 392 pipes, 112 of which are wooden and the remainder are lead. The bellows were originally pumped by hand on the strike of a bell from the organist, and now use a 3HP three-phase electric motor. Mohan Satya Raj has played the pipe organ for about the last 25 years.

== Queen's visit ==
In 1983, on 20 November, Queen Elizabeth II visited the church and celebrated her 36th wedding anniversary there, in a service led by Bishop Victor Premasagar and his ministerial colleagues Rev. B.P. Sugandhar and Rev. G.J. Hamilton, the pastor. Special invitations and passes were printed; every seat was marked and reserved for the guests and the congregation. Her visit to the church was scheduled for almost two hours, during which she unveiled a tablet to mark her visit. This is still intact inside the church. She was seated on the very first bench opposite to the pulpit, while the message was being delivered by Rt. Rev. Dr. Victor Premsagar. Marking the Queen's visit and her grandmother's attachment to this historical church, this church is also called the "Queen's Church".

== Service timings (Aaradhana) ==
- Sunday English Worship Service 07:30 AM
- Sunday Telugu Worship Service (Aaradhana) 09:30 AM
- Sunday School 09:30 AM
- Youth Fellowship (Sunday) 04:30 PM
- Women's Fellowship (Saturday) 05:30 PM
- Fasting Prayers (Second Saturday) 10:00 AM to 03:00 PM

== Pastors ==
- Rev. Lav David 1947-1950
- Rev. S. Stephen 1950-1954
- Rev. Kotilingam 1954-1955
- Rev. W.G.Carblidge 1955-1956
- Rev. Chinnaiah 1956-1964
- Rev. P.R.Dharmaraj 1964-1966
- Rev. P.A Muthaiah 1966-1969
- Rev. T.Ashirvadam 1969-1972
- Rev. B.D. Premsagar 1972-1974
- Rev. E.P. Yesudas 1975
- Rev. Simon 1975
- Rev. P.Seva Prakashan 1976-1977
- Rev. B. Eliezer 1977-1979
- Rev. P.A. Muttaiah 1979-1980
- Rev. P.Y. Luke 1980-1982
- Rev. G.J. Hamilton 1982-1984
- Rev. Ch.D. Sadanand 1984-1986
- Rev. T.B.Prabhakar Rao 1986-1987
- Rev. N.D.Paul Raj 1987-1990
- Rev. Ch.D. Sadanand 1990-1994
- Rev. D.Prasanna Kumar 1994
- Rev. N.D. Paul Raj 1994-1997
- Rev. P. Yesushankar 1997-2002
- Rev. Ch. D. Sadanand 2002-2004
- Rev. T. Danny Subodh 2004-2008
- Rev. D. Prasanna Kumar 2008-2010
- Rev. D. John Jonathan 2010-2012
- Rev. Katta Zacheaqus 2012
- Rev. A. C. Solomon Raj 2012-2016
- Rev. E J David 2016-present
- Rev. Krupakar Badugu 2019-present

== Outreach and prayer hall-cum-parsonage ==
The Holy Trinity Church has taken up the nearby villages under the outreach program and had successfully established a satellite church at Turkapally about 30km away from Bolarum. The extension church which serves the spiritual need of more than 5 villages nearby and more than 30 families, also undertakes the community development programs for the poor and the uneducated. The Turkapally Church stands still over the past 12 years, had been under the care of 5 shepherds. The early 19th century were the fruitful years for Christianity in India, and Bolarum could not remain untouched with the Good News. It is the same era when the Western Methodist Church was active and was working amongst the Indian nearby and surrounding places in Bolarum while the Anglican Holy Trinity Church was a place in worship only for the British Army Officers and their families. In the year 1937 Mr. C.S. David and his wife Mrs. Mercy David the legal owners of the land as measuring 857.05 sq.yards were in possession of the prior built structure situated at H.No. 81 8 82, Dovton Bazar Bolarum, Secunderabad - 500010, donated it to the Wesleyan Methodist Trust Association and was accepted on their behalf by then acting chairman Rev.S.C. Sackett. Since that time it was being in use as a Methodist church-cum-pastor's residence (parsonage).In the year 1947 when the Church of South India was formed and the different denomination churches were amalgamated to a greater unity, the present church at Doveton Bazar was also united and became a part of the Church of South India since then, the property was transferred in the watch of The Church of South India Trust Association. The present Holy Trinity Church during the 1947 was handed over by the British however stands still as a fruit of the efforts of this smaller church (Indian Christians) which took the responsibility of preserving the same and was instrumental in buying it from the British hence saving the heritage. In the year 1950 the smaller church was moved to Holy Trinity church, Medak Diocese while the old premises was still maintained as parsonage and prayer hall. Since then the premises has been outlived and due to climatic conditions, the structure suffered damage and an urgent need to demolish the structure safely was felt. With permission by Medak Diocese and suggestions by engineers in the year 2006, the old and unsafe structure was demolished safely. In the year 2006-2007 with the help and support of Diocese, local congregation and the Pastorate Committee under the able leadership of Rev. T. Danny Subodh took the challenge to build a new building to serve as Prayer Hall-cum-Parsonage successfully. The new prayer Hall-cum-Parsonage was dedicated to the glory of God on Independence day, 15 August 2007.

== See also ==
- List of churches in Secunderabad and Hyderabad
- All Saints Church, Secunderabad
