= Medak Cathedral =

- Medak Cathedral
- 18.0537°N 78.2671°E
- Country: India
- Denomination: Church of South India (A Uniting church comprising Wesleyan Methodist, Congregational, Lutheran, Calvinist and Anglican missionary societies – SPG, WMMS, LMS, Basel Mission, CMS, and the Church of England)
- Churchmanship: Anglican/ Wesleyan

History
- Dedication: St Peter

Specifications
- Capacity: 5000

Administration
- Province: Church Of South India
- Diocese: Diocese of Medak

Clergy
- Bishop: Rev.dr.k.Ruben mark
- Priest: Rev. Dr. T.Shantaiah

Medak Cathedral at Medak in Telangana, India, is one of the largest churches in India and has been the cathedral church of the Diocese of Medak of the Church of South India since 1947. Originally built by Charles Walker Posnett British Wesleyan Methodists, it was consecrated on 25 December 1924.

== History ==
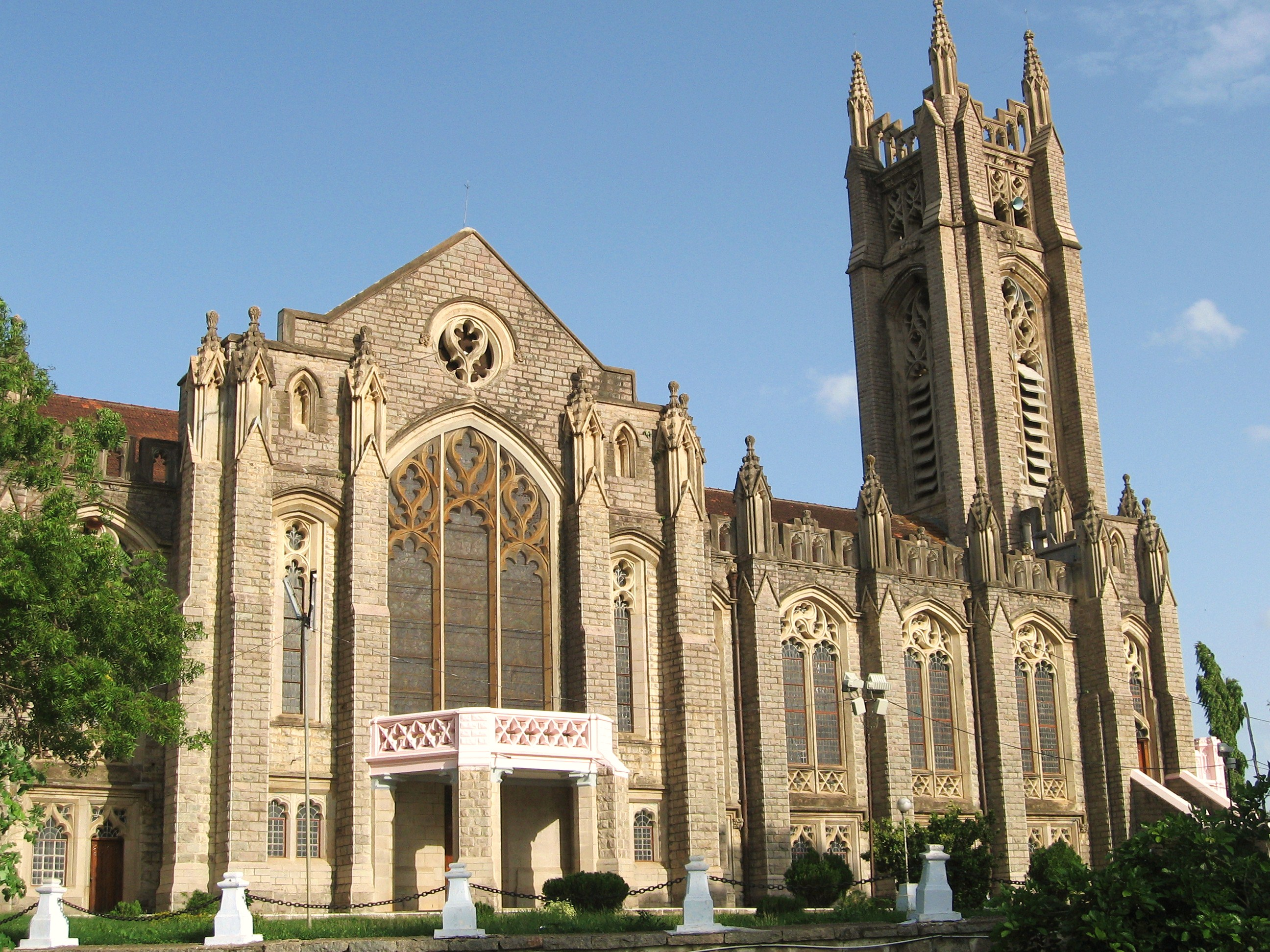
The Church of South India Cathedral at Medak. It is one of the largest churches in Asia

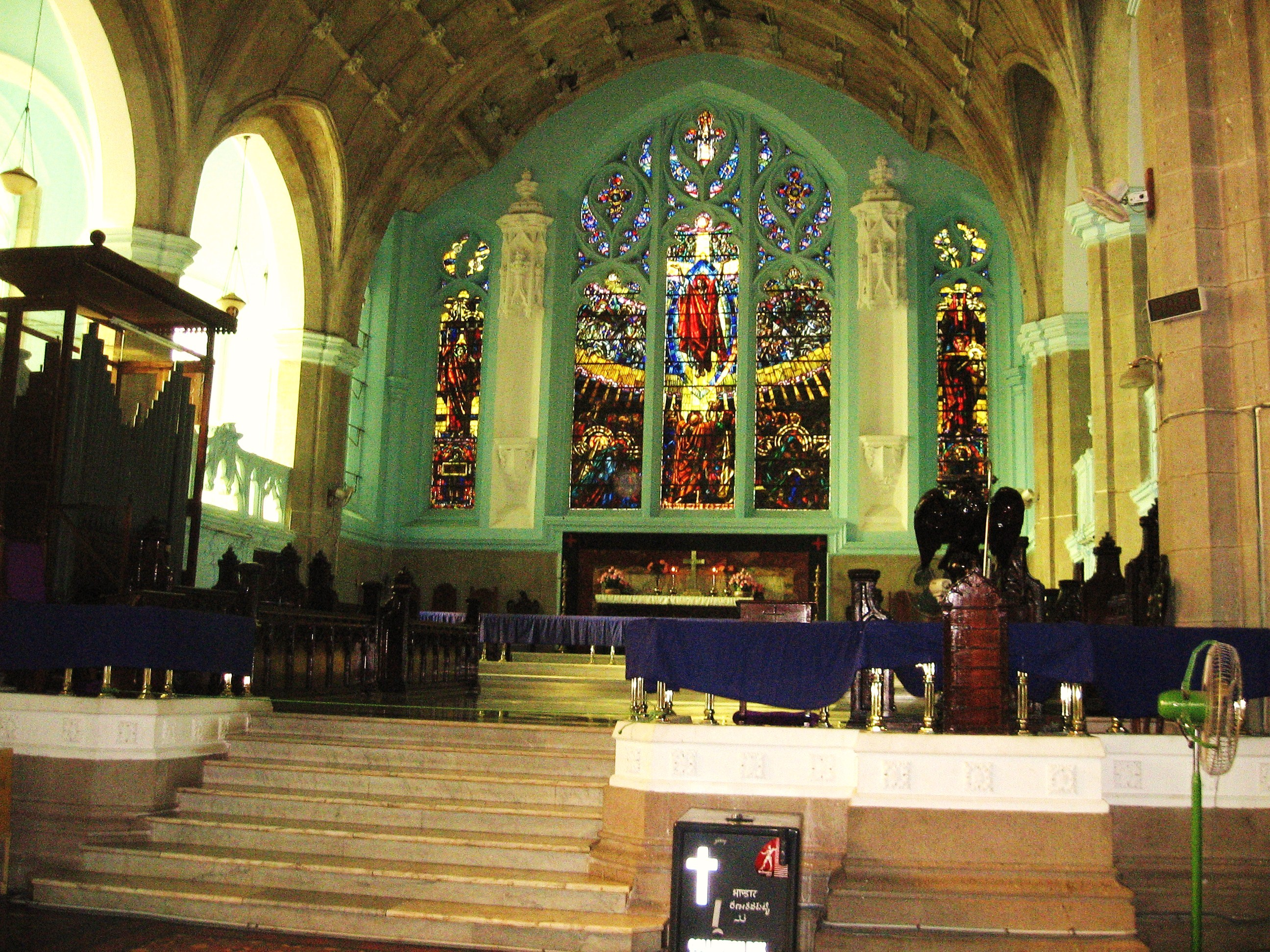
View of the altar in Medak Cathedral

Medak Cathedral is the seat of the Bishop in Medak for the Church of South India (comprising Wesleyan Methodist, Congregational and Anglican missionary societies - SPG, WMMS, LMS, CMS, and the Church of England). The cathedral is the largest of all churches in Telangana. The cathedral also sees over the Diocese of Medak which was consecrated on 25 December 1924. Built by the British Wesleyan Methodists, the cathedral is now under the jurisdiction of the Church of South India.

The cathedral's construction was spearheaded by Reverend Charles Walker Posnett, being funded by his family (devoted methodists that had gathered a large wealth owning tanneries in Runcorn), and the local government. Rev. Posnett arrived in Secunderabad in 1895 as a minister for the British soldiers at Trimullghery. Unsatisfied with the army work, he launched forth into villages. In the following year of 1896, Rev. Charles Walker Posnett visited a village called Medak and built a bungalow there by staying in dock bungalow. There was no railway route to Medak in those days. The journey of 60 miles (97 km) from Hyderabad had to be done on horseback and Rev. Posnett could do it in a day. There were then hardly two hundred Christians in the whole of Medak area. When he came to Medak, there was a small tiled house as the place of worship. As the number of Christians increased, he felt the need for expanding the church building. Rev.Posnett soon raised a moderate structure on that very spot just enough for the Christian community within the Mission Compound in the traditional shape of a church. He thought it was not a worthy place for divine worship. He started building the present Cathedral in 1914 on a sprawling 1,000 acres (4.0 km2) of land in Ghusnabad area. The foundations for the new church were laid in the beginning of the year 1914. During the early part of the 20th century, Medak district was reeling under famine and Rev. Posnett in order to provide succour to the suffering masses gave the masses employment in the construction of the church instead of running a free kitchen. The construction work on the cathedral went on for 10 years. The cathedral was consecrated in 1924 by Rev. Posnett expressing his grateful thanks to God for mitigating the sufferings of the people. When several Christian groups became re-united as the Church of South India, the church became the cathedral church of the diocese of Medak in October 1947.

== Architecture ==
The cathedral is 100 ft (30 m) wide and 200 ft (61 m) long, and conforms to the Gothic Revival style. It can accommodate about 5,000 people at a time. The mosaic tiles were imported from Britain and are of six different colours. Italian masons from Bombay were engaged for laying the decorative flooring. Massive pillars built with fine-hewn and well dressed grey stone support the gallery and the whole edifice. The roof of the church is made sound-proof by means of hollow sponge material, and has an impressive style of vaulting. The surface of the vaulting has the shape of squares. The bell-tower is 175 ft (53 m) high. (It is said that when the nizam of Hyderabad discovered that the church would be higher than the Charminar, he made a vain bid to have its height reduced.)

== Stained glass ==
The biggest attraction of the cathedral are its stained glass windows depicting different scenes from Christ's life – Ascension behind the altar, Nativity in the west transept, and Crucifixion in the east transept. The windows were designed by Sir. O. Salisbury of England. The stained glass windows were installed at different periods. The chancel window depicting the ascension was installed in 1927, two years after the cathedral was built. The stained glass was arranged by the native of the village Mr. Peram Alexander. The nativity window was installed in 1947 and the crucifixion window was installed in 1958 (after taking damage, restored in 1979).

== Architects and engineers ==
The church, along with the seminary, was designed and the construction overseen by John Bradshaw Gass of the firm Bradshaw Gass and Hope, Architects Engineers and Quantity Surveyors (of Bolton, London and Edinburgh at that time). JB Gass was, in fact, a Unitarian by persuasion, but had strong links with Congregationalists and Methodists through his own social involvement as a man of faith (added by M Head, former Senior Partner, retired, of Bradhsaw Gass and Hope LLP, Bolton Street, Lancashire).

== See also ==
- Telugu Christian
- List of churches in Secunderabad and Hyderabad
- Diocese of Medak
