= Bolarum =

Bolarum Bollorum
- Locality
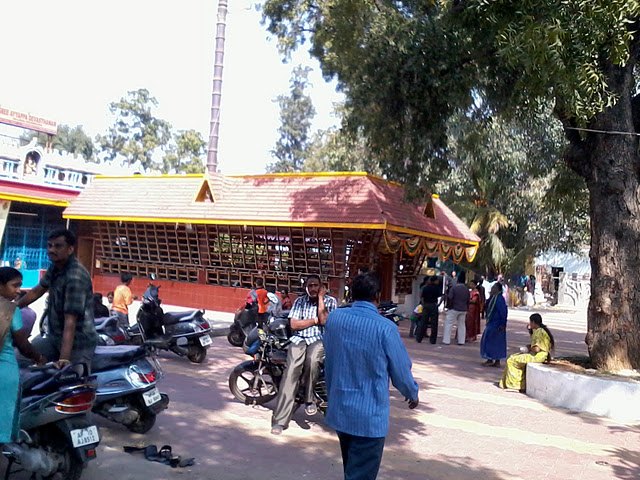
- The famous Ayyappa Temple in Bolarum.

- Location in Hyderabad, India
- Coordinates: 17°30′52″N 78°30′49″E
- Country: India
- State: Telangana
- District: Hyderabad

Area
  - Total: 8.36 km^{2} (3.23 sq mi)

Population (2011)
  - Total: 19,385
  - Density: 2,320/km^{2} (6,010/sq mi)

Languages
  - Official: Telugu, Urdu
- Time zone: UTC+5:30 (IST)
- PIN: 500 010
- Lok Sabha constituency: Malkajgiri
- Vidhan Sabha constituency: Cantonment
- Planning agency: Secunderabad Cantonment Board
- Website: telangana.gov.in

Bolarum is a locality in Secunderabad in Hyderabad, Telangana, India. It is in the Hyderabad Metropolitan Region. The distance from Bolarum to Secunderabad is 10 km.

== Demographics ==
As per the Census 2001, Bolarum had a population of 34,667 (58% males, 42% females) with 15% of the population under the age of six. Bolarum's average literacy rate is 58%, which is lower than the national average of 59.5%. Male and female literacy rates are 68% and 43% respectively.

== About ==
Rashtrapati Nilayam, the official retreat of the President of India, is in Bolarum. Sardar Vallabhbhai Patel planned the police action against the Razakars from Bolarum. It is also famous for the Ayyappa Swamy Temple which is one among the oldest temples in Hyderabad and Secunderabad. Bolarum has a very old Public Garden which is located near St. Ann's High School. Bolarum is located 3 km away from the Alwal bus stop. The City Public High School (later changed to The City High School), Valerian Grammar School, Sadhana Mandir High School and Shastri High School are the oldest and the most popular private schools in the area. Bolarum Railway Station (station code: BMO) was constructed by the British to transport military goods. There was a meeting held in Bolarum on 27 August 1952 with a huge number of students attending the meeting headed by the then mayor Thimma Raju.

== Landmarks ==
Some important landmarks in the area are; Ayyappa Swamy Temple, near Lakdawala Bus-Stop, and the Holy Trinity Church, Bolarum – a church built in European style architecture in 1847 by Queen Victoria, a member of British Royal family. In the 1980s, on her visit to Bolarum, Queen Elizabeth II attended church service for her wedding anniversary. Bolarum Reading Room and Library, close to Lakdawala crossroads is also a very old landmark of Bolarum. After multiple attempts, this library was finally inaugurated by Lieutenant Colonel Kirkwood on 23 July 1892.

== Transport ==
Bolarum Bazar railway station is the local train station located near Bolarum Bazar, which runs local electrified train service to Secunderabad, Kacheguda, Falaknuma, and Hyderabad Deccan (Nampally) railway stations. The state-owned TSRTC runs the city bus service, connecting to all the major parts of the city. It is approximately 10 km from Secunderabad railway station, 12 km from Begumpet Old Airport, and 51 km from Shamshabad International Airport.

== Notable people ==
- Kenneth Anderson (writer)
- K. H. Ara (painter)
