= Frank Whittaker =

Bishop Frank Whittaker, CSI Ayyagaru
- The Right Reverend
- Church: Church of South India (A Uniting church comprising Wesleyan Methodist, Congregational, Presbyterian and Anglican missionary societies – ABCFM, SPG, WMMS, LMS, Basel Mission, CMS, and the Church of England)
- Diocese: Medak
- Appointed: 27 September 1947
- Term ended: March 1960
- Predecessor: Position created
- Successor: Eber Priestley, CSI

Orders
- Ordination: Wesleyan Methodist Missionary Society
- Consecration: 27 September 1947
- Rank: Priest

Personal details
- Born: Frank Whittaker; 14 December 1894 England (United Kingdom)
- Died: 10 December 1961 (aged 66) Dornakal (India)
- Buried: CSI-Epiphany Cathedral Compound, Dornakal
- Denomination: Protestant
- Profession: Priesthood
- Education: Master of Arts (Cantab.)
- Alma mater: Oldham Grammar School, Oldham (England); St John's College, Cambridge (England)

Frank Whittaker (born 1894; died 1961) was the first Bishop of Medak in the Church of South India. Originally a Methodist, Whittaker became a bishop when several protestant denominations in India merged to form the Church of South India on 27 September 1947.

Previously, Whittaker had been the first head of the Normal Training College in Medak.

Rajaiah David Paul writes that in March 1960, Whittaker resigned as bishop, paving way for Eber Priestley who was appointed on 1 November 1960. That same year Whittaker moved to Dornakal to teach at the Andhra Union Theological College. However, nearly a year later, due to ill-health, Whittaker died in Dornakal on 10 December 1961.

Religious titles
| Preceded by New position | Church of South India; Bishop in Medak, Medak; 1947-1960 | Succeeded by Eber Priestley, CSI |
| Preceded by C. K. Jacob, CSI | Deputy Moderator; Church of South India Synod, Royapettah, Madras; 1950-1952 | Succeeded by H. Sumitra, CSI |
Honorary titles
| Preceded by New position | Member; Board of Governors; Andhra Union Theological College, Dornakal; 1947–1960 | Succeeded by Eber Priestley, CSI; 1961–1967 |
