= Graham Basanti =

Indian priest

The Reverend Sister M. G. Basanti, JELC L. Th. (Serampore)
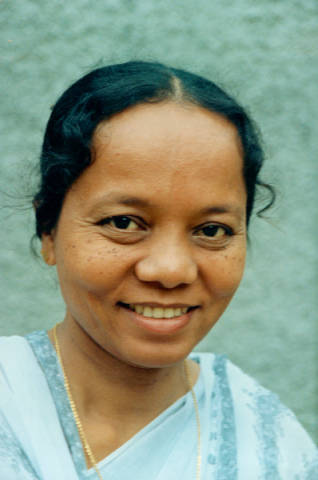
- M. G. Basanti at Chennai in 1993
- Born: M. Graham Basanti; 11 January 1950 (age 76); Shillong (Undivided Assam)
- Education: L. Th. (Serampore)
- Alma mater: JELC-Jensen Theological College, Kotpad, Koraput district (Odisha)
- Occupation: Priesthood
- Years active: 1974 – present (49 years)
- Parent(s): Smt. Krupamani (Mother); Sri M. G. Santisilo (Father)
- Religion: Christianity
- Church: Jeypore Evangelical Lutheran Church Society
- Ordained: 26 January 1992 at Jeypore (Odisha)
- Congregations served: Nabarangpur district, (Odisha) (1992–2009)
- Offices held: Matron, JELC-Girls' Boarding, Kotpad, (Odisha) (1974–1992); Councillor & Member, JELC Council & Synod (1974–1991); Regional Secretary, United Evangelical Lutheran Churches in India; Auxiliary Member, Bible Society of India, Odisha Auxiliary; Regional Secretary, Association of Theologically Trained Women in India; Member, National Council of Churches in India
- Title: The Reverend Sister

Graham Basanti (also known as M. G. Basanti) is a Lutheran pastor and the first ordained woman from the Protestant Jeypore Evangelical Lutheran Church Society (JELC), headquartered in Jeypore, Odisha, India. She was in the forefront of JELC leadership, representing it at United Evangelical Lutheran Churches in India in Chennai, Tamil Nadu. Basanti has been a founding member of the Association of Theologically Trained Women of India (ATTWI), and was also elected to its executive committee for the bienniums 1979–1981 and 2002–2006. Basanti has also been associated with the National Council of Churches in India.

After completion of her ordination in 1974, Basanti became a Matron of the century-old all-girls' JELC-Boarding in Kotpad. The boarding home was development-centric, which provided care for girls from interior areas. Basanti remained in its service for eighteen years until her ordination in 1992. She was then reassigned pastoral duties at Nowrangpur, until her retirement in 2009.

== Early life and spiritual formation ==
Basanti's father used to serve in the Indian Armed Forces. Basanti was born during his father's service in Undivided Assam in Shillong. After her scholastic studies in various schools across India, she discerned her avocation towards spirituality in the 1970s and became an Aspirante studying between 1970 and 1974 at a Spiritual Formation Centre, that is, Jensen Theological College, Kotpad, which was established on 10 April 1877. Notable faculty associated with the college included spiritual formators comprising the Old Testament scholar Subhasito Snehomoyo Patro, Dr. Theol. (Kiel); and the New Testament scholar Kishore Chandra Patra Kosala, Dr. Theol. (Kiel); among others.

Jensen Theological College, Kotpad, was an affiliated seminary of the Senate of Serampore College (University), India's first university (a university under Section 2 (f) of the University Grants Commission Act, 1956) founded by the Baptist Missions led by Joshua Marshman, William Carey, and William Ward. During the university convocation held on 1 February 1975, at Serampore College, Serampore, West Bengal, the university listed out the name of Basanti among those graduates eligible to receive the degree of Licentiate in Theology (L. Th.). Then registrars included Chetti Devasahayam, CBCNC, and J. T. Krogh, NELC. On the convocation day, the commemoration mass was conducted by the Old Testament scholar G. Babu Rao, CBCNC, then a faculty member of Serampore College at CNI-St. Olave's Church, Serampore.

== Legacy ==
Ordination of women in India had not been easy. Male chauvinism and other cultural barriers kept women away from ordination. In spite of these, Elizabeth Paul, CSI Order of Sisters, could be ordained in 1976. Other noteworthy ordinations followed with that of Eggoni Pushpalalitha, CSI (1984); Marathakavalli David, CSI (1989); Rajula Annie Watson, CSI (1991); Mutyala Sarah Grace Lalitha Kumari, CBCNC (1992); Bathineni Venkata Subbamma, AELC (1999); Evangeline Anderson-Rajkumar, ALC (2006); and many others down the line. Similarly, Navamani-Elia Peter, MCI, provided leadership to the Bible Society of India as its president.

In 2015, when Basanti witnessed ordination of women priests in Chhindwara, Madhya Pradesh, she remarked that:

To my surprise, I never had a problem serving the Church or churches. We now have 11 female pastors in our area.
