= Marathakavalli David =

The Reverend Marathakavalli David, CSI Ammagaru
- Born: 1950; Neyyattinkara, Kerala, India
- Died: 2011
- Citizenship: Indian
- Education: Kerala University (B.A.), Kerala United Theological Seminary (B.D.)
- Occupation: Pastor
- Parent(s): Smt. Gnanakristi and Sri M. G. Davy
- Religion: Christianity
- Church: Church of South India (Diocese of South Kerala)
- Ordained: May 28, 1989 by Bishop I. Jesudason at the CSI-Mateer Memorial Church, Trivandrum
- Congregations served: In Kerala: Nediakala, Kollam, Nannamkuzhy, Meppallikonam, Meenara, Poozhikkunnu, Jagathy and Aakkulam. In Telangana: Bhainsa
- Offices held: Presbyter, Diocese of South Kerala
- Title: The Reverend

Marathakavalli David (1950-2011) was the first woman Priest in Kerala hailing from the South Kerala Diocese (headquartered in Trivandrum) of the Church of South India who was ordained in 1989.

Marathakavalli trod her path in difficult streams as the Ordination of women was still being debated in her Church Society. When the issue of Ordination of women came up in the Church of South India Synod in 1970, it was vehemently opposed leading a decade of debate and protracted legal recourse initiated by the opponents but eventually the persistence of the Church of South India Synod led to a majority vote in 1982 favouring the ordination of women in the Church of South India. While Elizabeth Paul became the first ordained woman Priest in India in 1987, Marathakavalli David became the first woman priest in Kerala in 1989.

Since her school days, Marathakavalli nursed an ambition to become a Priest and was influenced by the lives of Florence Nightingale and William Carey who strove to serve mankind braving all odds. She also acknowledges the inspiration from one of the pioneer missionaries, Rev. Harris.

== The issue of women's ordination in the Church ==
It was during the 1970 Church of South India Synod that P. Solomon, then moderator, opened the process for the ordination of women as priests which finally got a two-thirds majority after nearly 12 years in 1982 during the period of I. Jesudason, then moderator. After successive ordinations that followed beginning with Elizabeth Paul in 1987 and others, Marathakavalli was ordained in 1989 by I. Jesudason, then Bishop - in - South Kerala (headquartered in Trivandrum). The year 1989 was eventful as the Church of South India Synod was led by Moderator Victor Premasagar, who all along took the scriptural stance, also echoed by I. Jesudason, that there was nothing standing in the way of women's ordination. Premasagar, an Old Testament Scholar and a member of the Society for Biblical Studies in India comprising the Old Testament and New Testament Scholars hailing from the Protestant, Catholic, Orthodox and Charismatic was regarded for his Scholarship and some of his Catholic counterparts who were members of the Pontifical Biblical Commission that met in 1976 concluded with a majority of 12 in favour and 5 against that the scripture did not bar the ordination of women. However, Cardinal Ratzinger subsequently ensured that a circulars were issued to the effect that anyone raising the issue of women's ordination (see Catholic Church doctrine on the ordination of women) in the Catholic Church was liable for blasphemy and summarily excommunicated with no grounds.

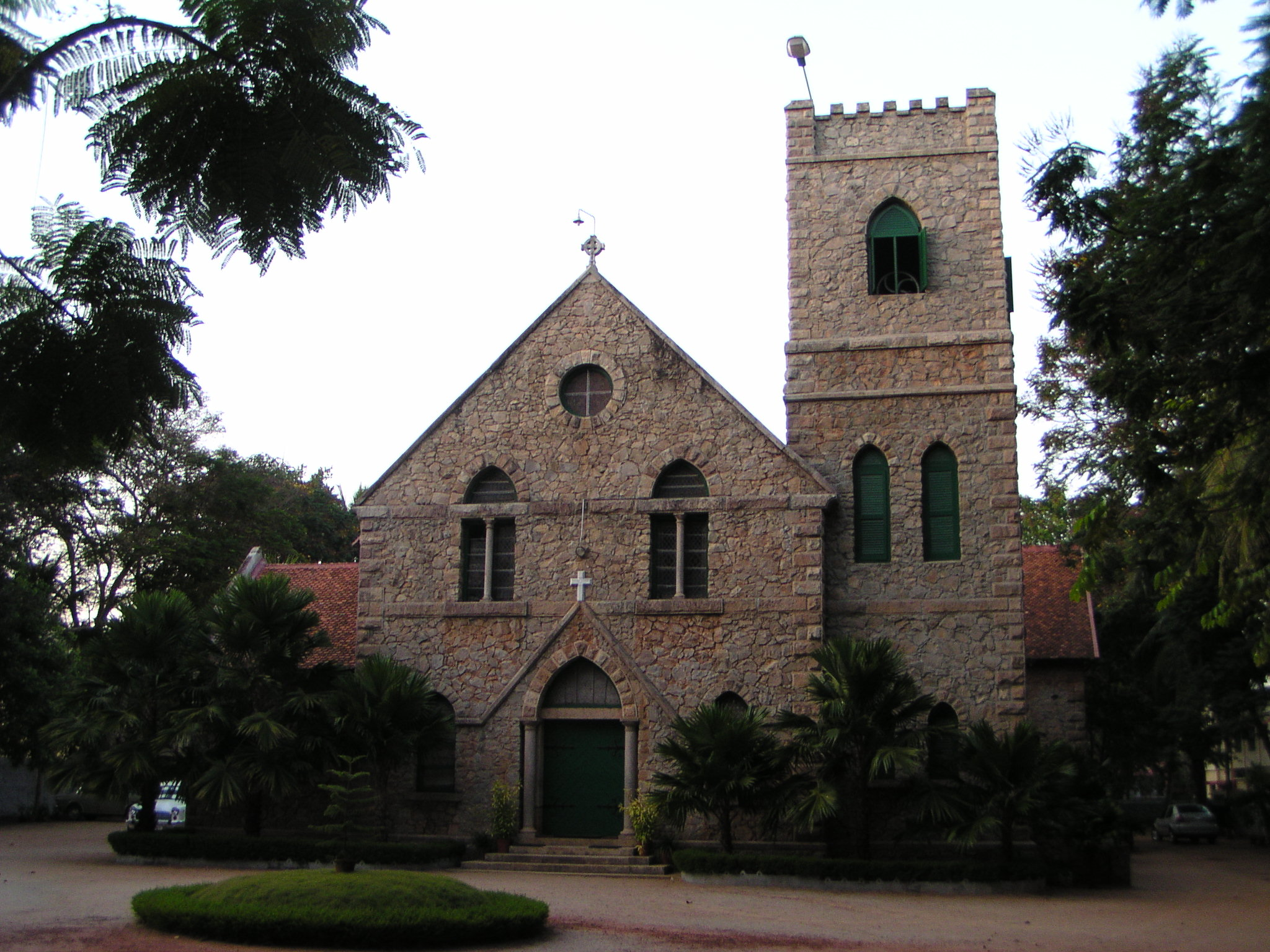
CSI-Mateer Memorial CSI Church, Trivandrum where Marathagavalli was ordained in 1989.

== Studies ==
After graduate studies from the Kerala University, Marathakavalli had her ministerial formation at the Kerala United Theological Seminary, Trivandrum, a seminary founded in 1943 and affiliated to the nation's first University, the Senate of Serampore College (University). Marathakavalli studied during the principalship of Jacob Varghese and other spiritual formators comprising J. W. Gladstone and others.

== Ecclesiastical ministry ==
After Marathakavalli's spiritual formation at the Kerala United Theological Seminary, Trivandrum, she was assigned the role of a Bible woman at Christ Church, Kollam, then Nediakala, Nannamkuzhy, Meppallikonam, Meenara, Poozhikkunnu, Jagathy and Aakkulam. Marathakavalli also went on missionary work to Bhainsa in Adilabad District in Telangana, where the South Kerala Diocese has a few missionary stations.

== Retrospect ==
Though women studying theology has become widely accepted over the decades, their desire to become a priest was being met with widespread criticism and resentment till the late 20th century. Victor Premasagar wrote that B. V. Subbamma, the first woman senator of the Senate of Serampore College (University) and a member of the Andhra Evangelical Lutheran Church could have been ordained long ago, but Church leaders fearing her leadership kept the issue of Ordination of women aside in her Church Society. The Association of Theologically Trained Women in India took up the cause of ordination of women, bringing up the issue with the Churches in India. However, skeptics considered priesthood to be the exclusive domain of men, leading to widespread debate in the Church. Though the Second Vatican Council that concluded in 1965 could not initiate the debate on the ordination of women, the Pontifical Biblical commission took up the debate in 1976. While this was so, the Anglican Communion began ordaining women since 1944, but this was not reciprocated in other parts of the world where the Anglican Communion was present, including the Church of England. As for the other Churches, the ground for ordination gained credence in a gradual manner. When Marathakavalli expressed her desire to become a priest, the Church of South India Synod stood by her, whereas stereotypical menfolk stood firm in retaining their orthodoxy with unfounded claims that women were 'unclean' and 'unfit'.

In 2010, after more than two decades of pastoral ministry ever since her ordination in 1989, Marathakavalli proved her skeptics wrong and bore no ill will against them. Marathakavalli reminiscences,

Though all in the church were not happy with the ordination of a woman, I believe that in course of time I could reverse the opinion of the skeptics through my dedicated work. From by experience, I can say with confidence that women priests are better equipped to console the grief-stricken.

== Eternity ==
Marathakavalli died at the age of 60 in October 2011, and the funeral mass was conducted by The Right Reverend Dharmaraj Rasalam the present bishop - in - South Kerala.
