= Association of Theologically Trained Women of India =

ATTWI
- Association of Theologically Trained Women of India
- Formation: February 20, 1979; 47 years ago
- Founders: Ms. Shanti R. Solomon and Rev. Herbert E. Hoefer, LCMS
- Founded at: Madras (Tamil Nadu)
- Type: Nonprofit
- Legal status: Registered Society
- Purpose: Fostering theological empowerment of women
- Professional title: The Association of Theologically Trained Women of India
- Location: India
- Origins: Ordination of women in Christianity
- Region served: India
- Fields: North India; North India 1; North India 2; Northeast India; North East India 1; North East India 2; South India; Andhra Pradesh; Karnataka; Kerala; Tamil Nadu; Telangana
- Members: 500+ (2024)
- Official language: English
- President: Ms. Jessica Richard
- Vice President: Ms. Dakerlin Mukhim
- Secretary: Rev. Sofia Christabel, CSI
- Treasurer: Dr. Laila Vijayan, CSI
- Affiliations: National Council of Churches in India, Nagpur (Maharashtra); Senate of Serampore College (University), Serampore (West Bengal)
- Website: https://attwi.in/

Presidents
- 1979 - Vanitha Nallathambi
- 1981 - Saroja Moses Sangha
- 1983 - Annamma K. K. George
- 1985 - Annamma K. K. George
- 1987 - Padmasani J. Gallup
- 1990 - Navamani Elia Peter
- 1992 - Navamani Elia Peter
- 1997 - Jessie Nesakumar
- 2002 - Evangeline Anderson Rajkumar
- 2006 - Nirmala Vasantha Kumar
- 2009 - Priscilla Reuben
- 2014 - Syamala Sukumar
- 2020 - Jyothi Sundar
- 2024 - Jessica Richard

The Association of Theologically Trained Women of India (ATTWI) is an association of Indian women theologians which was constituted in 1979 in Chennai.

It is an ecumenical organisation with more than 500 members.

== History ==
In 1977, Shanti Solomon and D. Hoeffer, a German missionary pioneered a conference for theologically trained women in Chennai with a three-fold purpose:

- to help the theologically trained women to explore ways and extend responsible participation in the total life and mission of the Church.
- to focus the attention of Churches on the presence of theologically trained women among them and to recognise their potential.
- to encourage theologically trained women to organise themselves into an all-India association to develop strategies for meeting their needs.

Another conference was organised in 1978 in Chennai. In 1979, an ad hoc committee was constituted to draft a constitution for forming an association. ATTWI became a reality in 1979.

== Sessions, venue and topics ==
Session	Year	Venue	Topic
I	1979 (20–22 February)	Gurukul Lutheran Theological College & Research Institute, Chennai (Tamil Nadu)	Theologically Trained Women in India - Dare, Share and Act
II	1981 (3–6 February)	Jeevan Jyothi Retreat Centre, Hyderabad (Undivided Andhra Pradesh)	Theologically Trained Women of India - Called to Serve
III	1983 (26–30 May)	Queen Victoria Girls Inter College, Agra (Uttar Pradesh)	New Dimensions in the ministry
IV	1985 (17–20 January)	Charal Mount, Charalkunnu (Kerala)	Feminist Theology in the West and Indian Church's Response
V	1987 (26–30 September)	UMT College, Calcutta (West Bengal)	Christian Home - the Nursery for Christian Concepts
VI	1990 (8–11 February)	Animation Centre, Bishop's House, Nagercoil (Tamil Nadu)	New Dawn for Women
VII	1992 (23–26 October)	Mecosabagh Girls Hostel, Nagpur (Maharashtra)	Theology - A Faith Experience
VIII	1997 (21–24 January)	Operation Mobilisation Retreat Centre, Secunderabad (Undivided Andhra Pradesh)	Theology - Praxis
IX	2002 (31 October - 2 November)	Bosco Institute for Research and Development of Youth (BIRDY), Hyderabad (Undivided Andhra Pradesh)	Towards a new community - a violence free society
X	2006 (3–5 May)	Serampore College, Serampore (West Bengal)	Empowered by God - Women transcend barriers
XI	2009 (October)		
XII	2014 (July)	Henry Martyn Institute, Hyderabad (Telangana)	
XIII	2020 (January)	CSI Synod Centre, Chennai (Tamil Nadu)	
XIV	2024 (21-22 May)	CSI LITE Centre, Chennai (Tamil Nadu)	Reimaging our potential

== Membership ==
Membership to ATTWI is presently restricted to those who hold a degree in theology offered by the Senate of Serampore College (University) or such other theological degrees recognised by the Senate.

== Notable people ==
- B. V. Subbamma, AELC (1925-2009)
- Elizabeth Paul, CSI (1927-2001)
- Navamani Elia Peter, MCI (1933-)
- Lalitha Krupa Rao, CBCNC (1942-2013)
- Marathakavalli David, CSI (1950-2011)
- Graham Basanti, JELC (1950-)
- R. L. Hnuni, BCM (1953-)
- Pushpa Lalitha, CSI (1956-)
- Rajula Annie Watson, CSI (1960-)
- Evangeline Anderson Rajkumar, ALC (1963-)

== Appraisal ==
- Wati A. Longchar, Consultant, World Council of Churches:
  ... ATTWI is an inter-denominational organisation which strives to uplift women and girl child, deal with issues pertaining to women and girl child rights, have dialogue with the concerned organisations, and make representation on their behalf and by doing so help the society to develop a healthier community by creating awareness.

== Publications ==
- Feminist Hermeneutics, Lalrinawmi Ralte, Evangeline Anderson Rajkumar, ISPCK, New Delhi, 2002, ISBN 81-7214-710-4.

== Executive Committees ==
The executive committees:

Term	President	Vice-President	Secretary	Treasurer	Executive Committee Members
1979-1981	Vanitha Nallathambi	Nalini Arles	Katakshamma Paul Raj	Annamma K. K. George	Shanti Solanki
1979-1981	Vanitha Nallathambi	Nalini Arles	Katakshamma Paul Raj	Annamma K. K. George	Graham Basanti
1979-1981	Vanitha Nallathambi	Nalini Arles	Katakshamma Paul Raj	Annamma K. K. George	Merian Mary
1979-1981	Vanitha Nallathambi	Nalini Arles	Katakshamma Paul Raj	Annamma K. K. George	Principal UTC
1979-1981	Vanitha Nallathambi	Nalini Arles	Katakshamma Paul Raj	Annamma K. K. George	President of AICCW
1979-1981	Vanitha Nallathambi	Nalini Arles	Katakshamma Paul Raj	Annamma K. K. George	Executive Secretary of Asian Church Women's Conference
1981-1983	Saroja Moses Sangha	Florence Deenadayalan	Sumathi Williams	Susy David	Smitha Pramanik
1981-1983	Saroja Moses Sangha	Florence Deenadayalan	Sumathi Williams	Susy David	Shantha Kumari
1981-1983	Saroja Moses Sangha	Florence Deenadayalan	Sumathi Williams	Susy David	Vatsala Christian
1983-1985	Annamma K. K. George	Christina Lall	Sarojini Prasad Rao	Grace Bai Joseph	Nihar Nalini Chatriya
1983-1985	Annamma K. K. George	Christina Lall	Sarojini Prasad Rao	Grace Bai Joseph	Smitha Rathod
1983-1985	Annamma K. K. George	Christina Lall	Sarojini Prasad Rao	Grace Bai Joseph	Vimala Kantharao
1985-1987	Annamma K. K. George	Christina Lall	Sarojini Prasad Rao	Grace Bai Joseph	Nihar Nalini Chatriya
1985-1987	Annamma K. K. George	Christina Lall	Sarojini Prasad Rao	Grace Bai Joseph	Vimala Kantharao
1985-1987	Annamma K. K. George	Christina Lall	Sarojini Prasad Rao	Grace Bai Joseph	Sumathi Williams
1985-1987	Annamma K. K. George	Christina Lall	Sarojini Prasad Rao	Grace Bai Joseph	Hannah Joseph
1985-1987	Annamma K. K. George	Christina Lall	Sarojini Prasad Rao	Grace Bai Joseph	Sarala David
1985-1987	Annamma K. K. George	Christina Lall	Sarojini Prasad Rao	Grace Bai Joseph	Saroja Sangha
1985-1987	Annamma K. K. George	Christina Lall	Sarojini Prasad Rao	Grace Bai Joseph	Navamani Elia Peter
1985-1987	Annamma K. K. George	Christina Lall	Sarojini Prasad Rao	Grace Bai Joseph	Mathai Zachariah
1987-1990	Padmasani J. Gallup	S. A. Benjamin	E. Joseph	S. Devapalana	Smitha Pramanik
1987-1990	Padmasani J. Gallup	S. A. Benjamin	E. Joseph	S. Devapalana	Jessie Ranjan
1987-1990	Padmasani J. Gallup	S. A. Benjamin	E. Joseph	S. Devapalana	Shanti Kumari
1987-1990	Padmasani J. Gallup	S. A. Benjamin	E. Joseph	S. Devapalana	Annamma K. K. George
1987-1990	Padmasani J. Gallup	S. A. Benjamin	E. Joseph	S. Devapalana	M. Bage
1990-1992	Navamani Elia Peter	Nirmala Vasantha Kumar	Rajakumari Joseph	Ratnavathi Babu Rao	Rachel Matthew
1990-1992	Navamani Elia Peter	Nirmala Vasantha Kumar	Rajakumari Joseph	Ratnavathi Babu Rao	Manoj Manjari Kumari
1990-1992	Navamani Elia Peter	Nirmala Vasantha Kumar	Rajakumari Joseph	Ratnavathi Babu Rao	Grace M. Joseph
1990-1992	Navamani Elia Peter	Nirmala Vasantha Kumar	Rajakumari Joseph	Ratnavathi Babu Rao	Padmasani J. Gallup
1990-1992	Navamani Elia Peter	Nirmala Vasantha Kumar	Rajakumari Joseph	Ratnavathi Babu Rao	Narendra John
1992-1997	Navamani Elia Peter	Vijayamma Prasad	Florence Deenadayalan	Shanta George	Suguna Devasundaram
1992-1997	Navamani Elia Peter	Vijayamma Prasad	Florence Deenadayalan	Shanta George	Manoj Manjari
1992-1997	Navamani Elia Peter	Vijayamma Prasad	Florence Deenadayalan	Shanta George	Awala Longkumer
1992-1997	Navamani Elia Peter	Vijayamma Prasad	Florence Deenadayalan	Shanta George	Sennangshila Benjamin
1992-1997	Navamani Elia Peter	Vijayamma Prasad	Florence Deenadayalan	Shanta George	P. C. Laltlani
1992-1997	Navamani Elia Peter	Vijayamma Prasad	Florence Deenadayalan	Shanta George	Vidya Benjamin
1992-1997	Navamani Elia Peter	Vijayamma Prasad	Florence Deenadayalan	Shanta George	Ratnavathi Babu Rao
1992-1997	Navamani Elia Peter	Vijayamma Prasad	Florence Deenadayalan	Shanta George	Nirmala Susai
1992-1997	Navamani Elia Peter	Vijayamma Prasad	Florence Deenadayalan	Shanta George	Shyamala Baby
1992-1997	Navamani Elia Peter	Vijayamma Prasad	Florence Deenadayalan	Shanta George	Kunjamma Philip
1997-2002	Jessie Nesakumar	B. V. Subbamma	Soumini Jayan	Sabitha Swaraj	Shyamala Sukumar
1997-2002	Jessie Nesakumar	B. V. Subbamma	Soumini Jayan	Sabitha Swaraj	Margaret Prabhu
1997-2002	Jessie Nesakumar	B. V. Subbamma	Soumini Jayan	Sabitha Swaraj	Ida Swamidas
1997-2002	Jessie Nesakumar	B. V. Subbamma	Soumini Jayan	Sabitha Swaraj	Anne Bhosle
1997-2002	Jessie Nesakumar	B. V. Subbamma	Soumini Jayan	Sabitha Swaraj	Sunitha Noronha
1997-2002	Jessie Nesakumar	B. V. Subbamma	Soumini Jayan	Sabitha Swaraj	Ashwathy John
2002-2006	Evangeline Anderson Rajkumar	Annamma Thariyan	Pankaja Manilal	Ratnavathi Babu Rao	B. Subhashini
2002-2006	Evangeline Anderson Rajkumar	Annamma Thariyan	Pankaja Manilal	Ratnavathi Babu Rao	Shanti Tilak
2002-2006	Evangeline Anderson Rajkumar	Annamma Thariyan	Pankaja Manilal	Ratnavathi Babu Rao	Graham Basanti
2002-2006	Evangeline Anderson Rajkumar	Annamma Thariyan	Pankaja Manilal	Ratnavathi Babu Rao	Christina Lall
2002-2006	Evangeline Anderson Rajkumar	Annamma Thariyan	Pankaja Manilal	Ratnavathi Babu Rao	Thankamma Varkey
2002-2006	Evangeline Anderson Rajkumar	Annamma Thariyan	Pankaja Manilal	Ratnavathi Babu Rao	Anna Mary
2006-2009	Nirmala Vasantha Kumar	Susan George Matthew	Limatula Longkumer	Krupaveni Prakasha Rao	Susan Thomas
2006-2009	Nirmala Vasantha Kumar	Susan George Matthew	Limatula Longkumer	Krupaveni Prakasha Rao	Leela Rajanandam
2006-2009	Nirmala Vasantha Kumar	Susan George Matthew	Limatula Longkumer	Krupaveni Prakasha Rao	Ivaleen Ammanna
2006-2009	Nirmala Vasantha Kumar	Susan George Matthew	Limatula Longkumer	Krupaveni Prakasha Rao	Kanthamani Christopher Raj
2006-2009	Nirmala Vasantha Kumar	Susan George Matthew	Limatula Longkumer	Krupaveni Prakasha Rao	Lovely Mukherjee
2006-2009	Nirmala Vasantha Kumar	Susan George Matthew	Limatula Longkumer	Krupaveni Prakasha Rao	Rualzamawii
2006-2009	Nirmala Vasantha Kumar	Susan George Matthew	Limatula Longkumer	Krupaveni Prakasha Rao	Ravi Tiwari
2009-2014	Priscilla Reuben				
2014-2020	Syamala Sukumar				
2020-2024	Jyothi Sundar				
2024-Present	Jessica Richard	Dakerlin Mukhim	Sofia Christabel	Laila Vijayan	Shantha Kumari
2024-Present	Jessica Richard	Dakerlin Mukhim	Sofia Christabel	Laila Vijayan	Minitha
2024-Present	Jessica Richard	Dakerlin Mukhim	Sofia Christabel	Laila Vijayan	Elizabeth Giri
2024-Present	Jessica Richard	Dakerlin Mukhim	Sofia Christabel	Laila Vijayan	Vedakani
2024-Present	Jessica Richard	Dakerlin Mukhim	Sofia Christabel	Laila Vijayan	Elizabeth Aharone
