= Subbamma =

Subbamma is an Indian name of feminine nature.

- B. V. Subbamma was an indigenous scholar, Indian theologian.
- Santha Kumari, birth name Vellaala Subbamma, is an Indian musical artist and film actress.
- Subbamma is a local deity of Punganuru, Andhra Pradesh
