= V. S. Francis =

CSI bishop

The Right Reverend V.S. Francis
- Bishop of East Kerela
- Church: Church of South India
- Diocese: East Kerela
- Installed: 2006
- Predecessor: George Daniel

Personal details
- Spouse: Darly
- Children: Franklin (son); Fechma (daughter)

V. S. Francis is the fourth Bishop of East Kerela: he has served since 2019.

Francis was born in Ellumpuram on 18 May 1961. He was educated at the Union Biblical Seminary, Pune. He served congregations in Chemmannar, Kattappana, Konnathadi and Kaliyar. He was also Chaplain to Bishop George Daniel and Treasurer of the East Kerala Diocese of the Church of South India. He was consecrated of him at the CSI Cathedral Melukavu on 8 July 2019.

== Notes ==
Church of England titles
Preceded by George Daniel	Bishop of East Kerela; 2019 –	Succeeded by Incumbent
