= Saint George CSI Church, Pallikkunnu =

- Saint George CSI Church
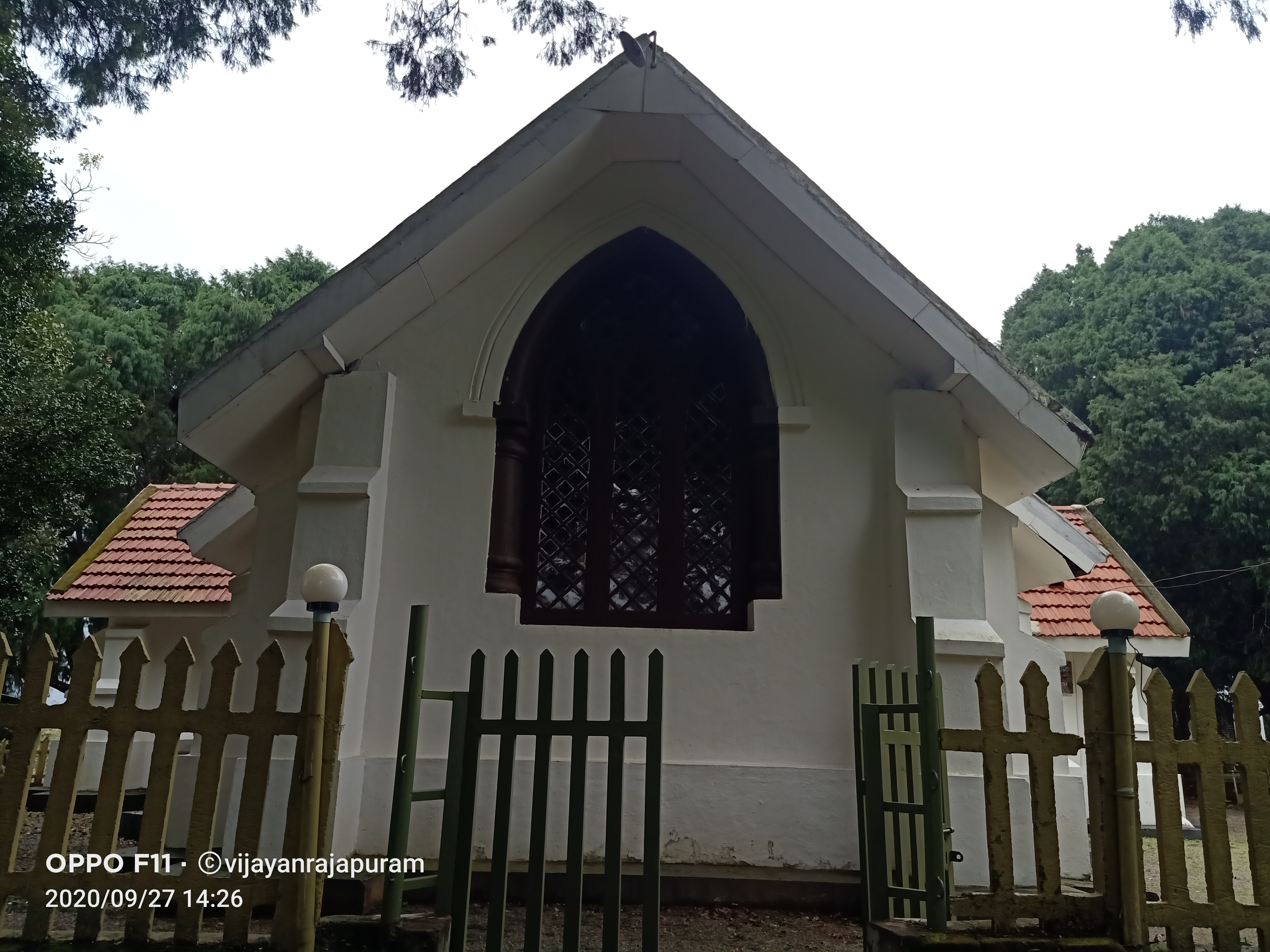
- Location: Pallikkunnu, Idukki
- Country: India

History
- Founded: 1869
- Founder: rev hentry baker junior
- Dedication: Saint George

Administration
- Archdiocese: Diocese of East Kerala of the Church of South India

St. George CSI Church is a church under the Diocese of East Kerala of the Church of South India (CSI), located in Pallikkunnu, Idukki. The church was built in 1869 by the British and Saint George is the patron saint of the church.

== History ==
The land for the church measuring 15 acres and 62 cents was donated by the Travancore Maharani Rani Sethulakshmibai. The construction of the church was completed by Henry Baker Jr. and other plantation owners in 1862. The church was known as Azhutha St. George CSI Church in its early days. Initially, only the British were allowed to worship. Mass and liturgy were conducted in English. After a few years, others were allowed to enter and the rites were arranged in Malayalam and Tamil. The peculiarity of the church is that the corpse of a horse is also buried. J.D. Monroe's white horse named Downey, rests here. There are also the tombstones of 34 foreigners here including John Munro, who was instrumental in planting tea in Munnar.

== Architecture ==
The church is built with European architectural ingenuity, using wild stone, lime, teak, spruce and wood. The construction cost at that time was ₹800. The furniture and articles used for religious ceremonies are of the British era. It also has glass cut windows and antique wooden furniture.
