= Diocese of South Kerala of the Church of South India =

Diocese of the Church of South India in Kerala, India

Diocese of South Kerala Diocese
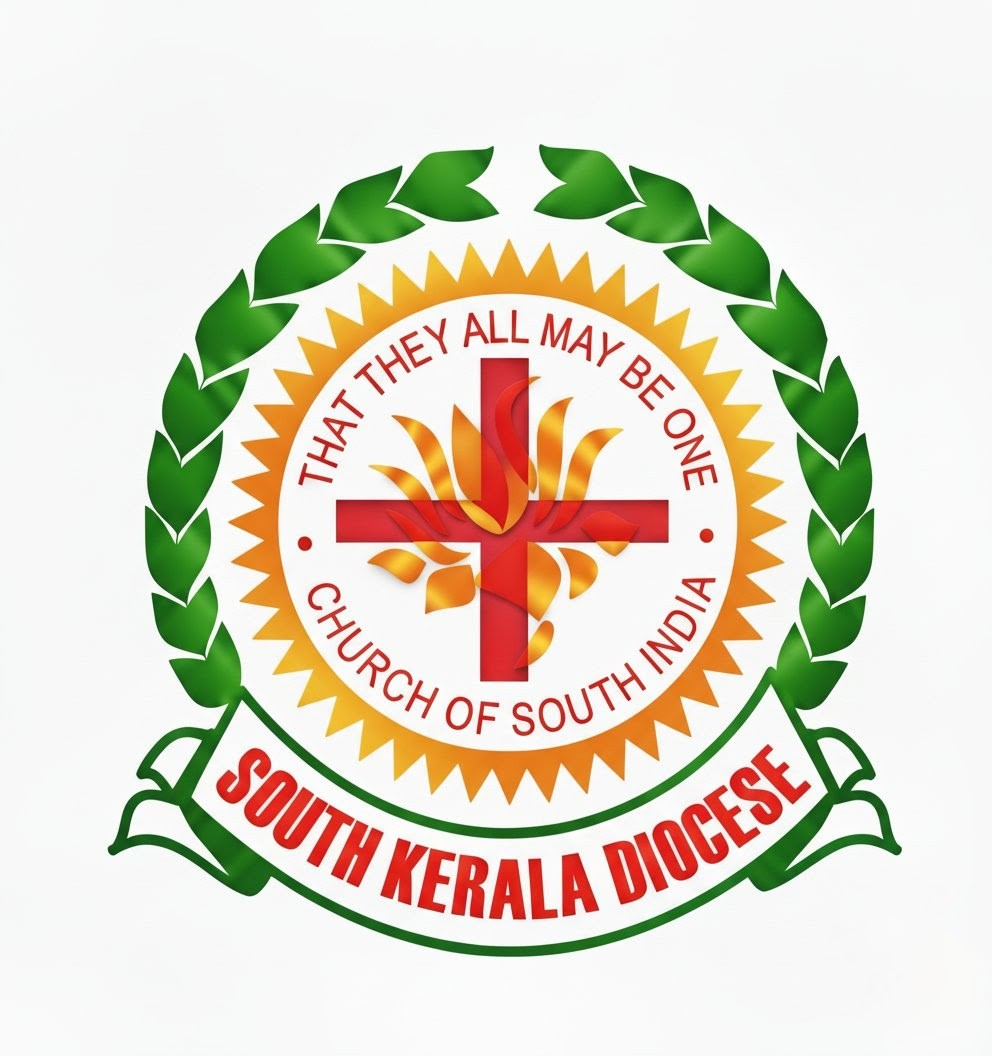

Location
- Country: India
- Headquarters: Thiruvananthapuram
- Coordinates: 8°30′36″N 76°57′09″E

Statistics
- Congregations: 623
- Members: 5,32,000

Information
- Denomination: Church of South India
- Established: 1959
- Cathedral: Mateer Memorial Church

Current leadership
- Bishop: Rt.Rev.Dr.Prinstone Ben

Website
- csiskd.com

South Kerala Diocese(Tamil: தெற்கு கேரளம் மறைமாவட்டம்) is a diocese of the Church of South India which consists of CSI churches in Trivandrum and Kollam districts of Kerala. It is one of the biggest dioceses in the Church of South India, a United Protestant denomination.The diocese was constituted on 2 June 1959. Anglican diocese established in 1879, later becoming part of the Church of South India (CSI). The South Travancore Diocese was bifurcated into the Kanyakumari Diocese and the South Kerala Diocese in 1959, Arnold Legg who was the Bishop of South Travancore Diocese since 1937, continued to serve as the Bishop of South Kerala Diocese. In April 2015, a part of the diocese was removed to form a new diocese, the Kollam-Kottarakkara Diocese. In Kerala, there were, until April 2015, three other CSI Dioceses viz: North Kerala Diocese, Madhya Kerala Diocese, East Kerala Diocese. In 2010, the diocese had 352 ordained pastors, 49 retired pastors and more than 200 church workers. There are 70 districts and 623 churches in this diocese.

== History ==
The history of the Protestant Missions in South Kerala begins with the arrival of William Tobias Ringeltaube on 25 April 1806 at Mylaudy near Cape Comorin(Kanyakumari). As missionary work was already started in Tranquebar, a Danish colony, Ringeltaube travelling in a Danish ship arrived at Tranquebar, invited by Maharasan Vethamonikam desikar the first convert christian from this region. Travancore was then a native state under British protection ruled by its Maharaja. It was with great difficulty and largely through the intervention of the British Resident in Travancore, Colin Macaulay, that Ringeltaube obtained permission to construct Church at Mylaudy. In May 1809 the foundation stone was laid for the Church. The construction of a modest structure was dedicated in September that year. The Mylaudy Church was the first Protestant church built in the erstwhile princely state of Travancore, and it formed the nucleus of the present Kanyakumari and South part of Kerala.

== South Travancore Diocese ==
In the year 1947, union of a number of Protestant denominations in South India that occurred after the independence of India. United Church joined with the Anglican and Methodist Churches to form the Church of South India (CSI).

The last LMS missionary was Rt. Rev. A. H. Legg. After the End of LMS, The Rt. Rev. A. H. Legg was consecrated on 27-09-1947 and installed as the first Bishop of the South Travancore Diocese on 13-10-1947. The present Kanyakumari district was historically part of the erstwhile Travancore State. Kanyakumari district was transferred to Madras State on 1 November 1956. Due to that, The South Travancore Diocese was bifurcated into the Kanyakumari Diocese (Tamil Nadu) and the south Kerala Diocese (Kerala) in 1959.

== Bishops of the South Kerala Diocese ==
=== Travancore Diocese ===
- Arnold Legg (27 September 1947 - until 19 December 1959)

=== South Kerala Diocese ===
1. Arnold Legg (1959-1965)
2. William Paul Vachalan (1967 -1972)
3. Isaiah Jesudason (1973-1990)
4. Samuel Amirtham (1990-1997)
5. J. W. Gladstone (1997-2011)
6. Dharmaraj Rasalam (2011 -2023)
7. Prinstone Ben (from 22-03-2026)

== Notable Churches under South Kerala Diocese ==
- Mateer Memorial Church, LMS, Trivandrum

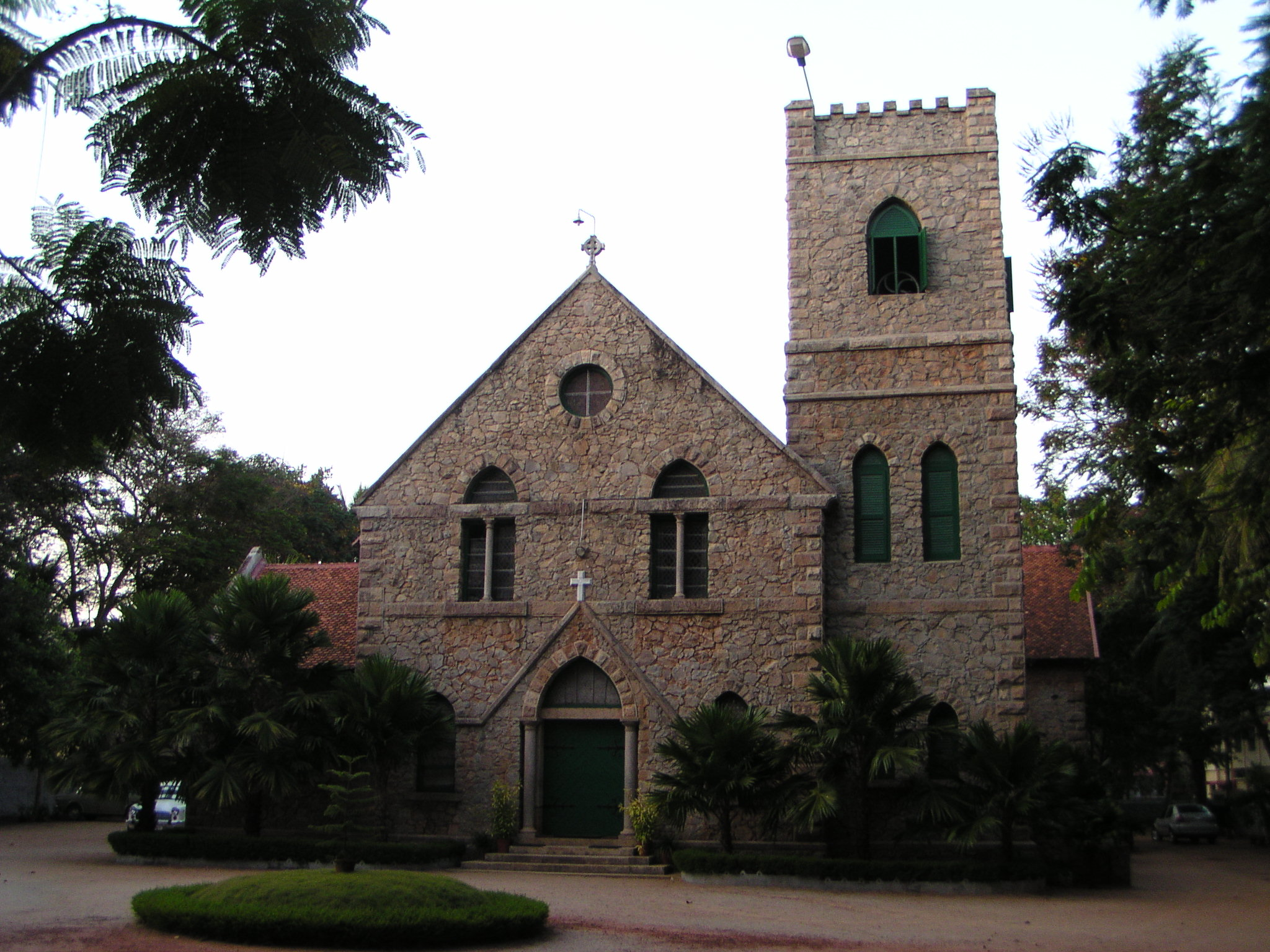
Mateer Memorial Church

The Mateer Memorial Church, situated in the heart of the city of Trivandrum, is one of the oldest of its kind in South India. The origin of the Trivandrum Church dates back to the arrival of the Rev. John Cox, the first LMS missionary in Trivandrum, in 1838 . The new church building for the church was dedicated on the first day of December 1906. The church was dedicated by Rev. R. W. Thompson, the Foreign Secretary of the LMS who was heading a deputation as part of the centenary of the Travancore Mission. The new church building was named Mateer Memorial Church in honour of the second missionary Rev. Samuel Mateer.

== Missionaries ==
- William Tobias Ringeltaube
- Charles Mead
- Dr Theodore Howard Somervel
- Rev John Abbs
- Rev. Samuel Mateer

== London Mission Society ==
The origin of London Missionary Society was associated with the evangelical revival in England in the last quarter of the eighteenth century. Every Christian in England considered it his duty to strive hard for the spreading of the gospel both at home and abroad. The enlightened Christians in England also advocated strongly in favour of allowing missionaries to spread the gospel in India. This dream became a reality with the founding of missionary societies. Among these, the London Missionary Society stood in the vanguard; it came into being in 1795 on a nondenominational basis. Its motto was Isaiah 52:7 "How beautiful upon the mountains are the feet of him that bringeth good tidings that publisheth peace; that bringeth good tidings of good; that publisheth salvation; that saith unto Zion, Thy God reigneth!" The fundamental principle of the society was "not to send Presbyterianism, Independency, Episcopacy or any other form of church order and Government; but the Glorious Gospel of the blessed God". The history of the missionary activities of the Protestant church in Travancore commenced with the arrival of William Tobias Ringeltaube, a missionary of the LMS in CE 1806. The LMS started its work first among the Parayas and it soon spread among the Nadars. Once the Nadars were considered an oppressed class in Travancore, who were not satisfied with their position. The attention of the missionaries of the LMS was also turned to the lower sections of the society like Parayas, Pulaya, Ezhavas etc., who suffered from caste tyranny and oppression. They were considered as the "lower orders." The LMS missionaries took a strong stand against caste distinctions within the churches through education. Their aim was to create "an independent, self supporting, self-governing and self-propagating native church. The result was the formation of the South India United Church (S.I.U.C) in 1908. When SIUC was formed in South India, Travancore Mission of the LMS was the most successful among the missions in the whole of India.

After the Indian Independence, On 27 September 1947 the General Assembly of South India United Church, the General council of Church of India, Pakistan, Burma and Ceylon, and South India Provincial Synod of Methodist Church joined together to form the Church of South India as the largest united national church in India. The continued growth has been further enriched with the joining of the churches of Basel Mission and the Anglican Diocese of Nandyal. A unique church was born out of the blending of the Episcopal and non - Episcopal traditions as a gift of God to the people of India and as a visible sign of the ecclesiastical unity for the universal church.

== South Kerala Diocese Logo ==
The core CSI logo features:

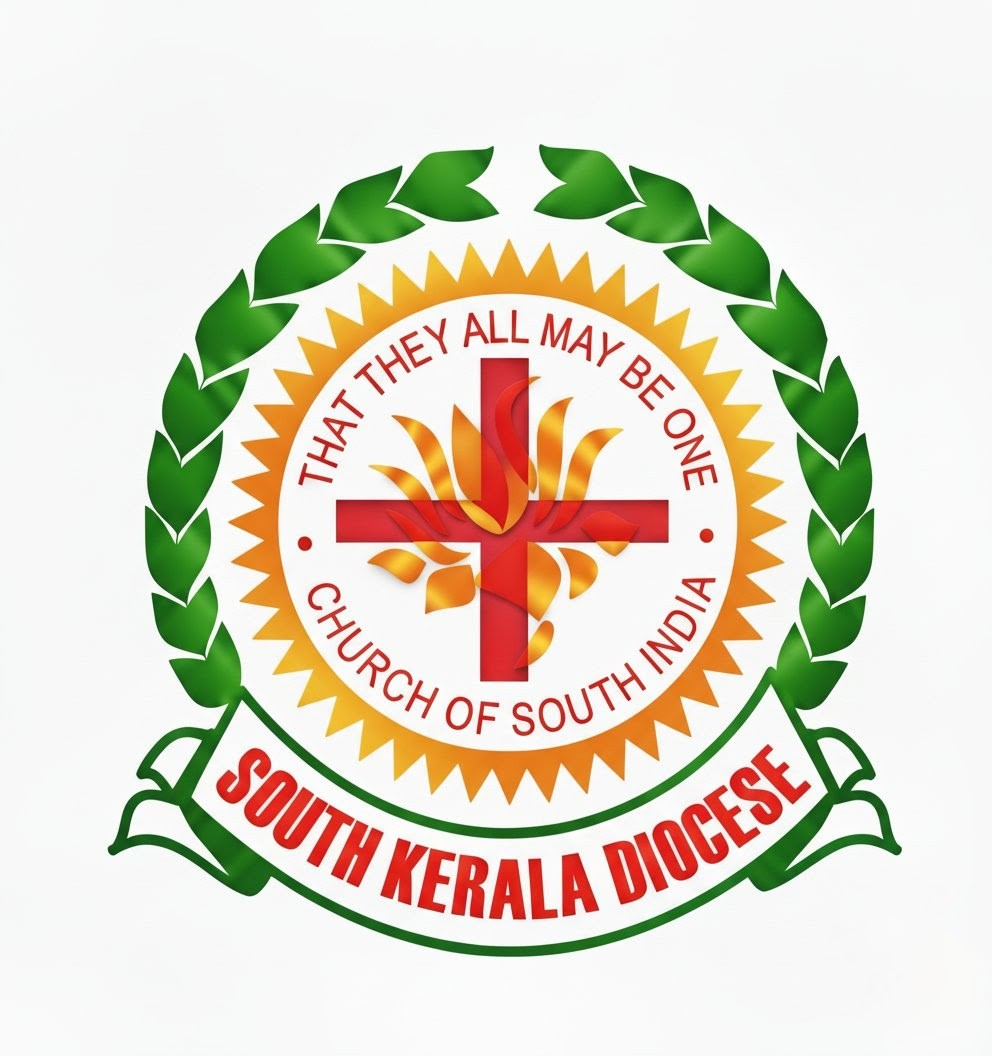
CSI South Kerala Diocese Logo

- A cross at the center, representing the foundation of the Church's faith.
- The cross is superimposed on a stylized lotus flower. The lotus, an important Indian symbol of spiritual significance, signifies the indigenous nature of the Church and its reliance on God's grace.
- The petals of the stylized lotus also represent thefiery, split tongues of the Holy Spirit, as described in the Book of Acts.
- The entire image is usually on a white background, often enclosed within a circle or emblem that bears the Church's name and its motto, an excerpt from John 17:21: "That they all may be one".

== Origin of South Kerala Diocese ==
The Rt. Rev. William Paul Vachalan was consecrated and installed in the South Kerala Diocese on 2-7-1967. He died on 5-11-1972 while in service. The Rt.Rev.Isaiah Jesudason, was consecrated and installed in the South Kerala Diocese on 5 August 1973. He was Deputy Moderator of the Church of South India from 1980–81 and Moderator from 1982–1987. He retired from active service on 14 February 1990 on completion of 65 years of age.

The Rt.Rev.Dr.Samuel Amirtham was consecrated and installed as Bishop of the Diocese on 20-05-1990. He was director of the Programme on Theological Education and Director of the Ecumenical Institute, Bossey of the WCC 1980–1990. He retired from active service on 19the August 1997.

Most.Rev.Dr.J.W.Gladstone, was consecrated and installed as Bishop on 16-9-1997. He was the principal of KUT seminary, Trivandrum and the president of the Senate of Serapore, Culcutta. He is selected as the Moderator of the C.S.I. Synod in 2008. He retired from active service on 25 December 2010 on completion of 65 years of age.

The Rt.Rev. A.Dharmaraj Rasalam was consecrated and installed as Bishop on 23.7.2011.

== List of churches ==
Church of South India / South Kerala Diocese ( CSI / SKD ) List of Churches

There 623 churches in CSI / SKD, Thiruvananthapuram. As a whole the churches are divided in AREA and DISTRICT.

They are as given below.

AREA List

List of AREA is give below

S.no.	AREA
1	BALARAMAPURAM
2	KANJIRAMKULAM
3	KATTAKADA
4	NEDUMANGADU
5	NEYYATTINKARA
6	PARASSALA
7	PEYAD
8	TRIVANDRUM
9	VELLARADA

AREA List along with DISTRICT

S.no.	AREA		DISTRICT
1	BALARAMAPURAM		
		1	Ammanoorkonam
		2	Balaramapuram
		3	Nemom
		4	Peringammala
		5	Venganoor
		6	Vizhinjam
2	KANJIRAMKULAM		
		1	Chani
		2	Kodiyanoorkonam
		3	Nellikkakuzhi
		4	Paraniyam
		5	Sittaram
		6	Thirupuram
3	KATTAKADA		
		1	Anacode
		2	Changa
		3	Irinchal
		4	Kattakada
		5	Kulathummel
		6	Plavoor
		7	Punalal
		8	Uriacode
		9	Veeranakavu
4	NEDUMANGADU		
		1	AruvikKara
		2	Elavattom
		3	Manoorkonam
		4	Nedumangadu
		5	Parandode
		6	Perayam
		7	Puthukulangara
		8	Vithura
		9	Zionkunnu
5	NEYYATTINKARA		
		1	Amaravila
		2	Irumbil
		3	Kariprakonam
		4	Moolakonam
		5	Neyyattinkara
		6	Perumkadavila
		7	Poovathoor
		8	Thozhukkal
6	PARASSALA		
		1	Arayoor
		2	Kakkaravila
		3	Maypuram
		4	Palukal
		5	Parassala
		6	Parasuvaikal
		7	Viraly
7	PEYAD		
		1	Aramada
		2	Erayamcode
		3	Kavalottukonam
		4	Malayam
		5	Malayinkeezhu
		6	Managad
		7	Mulayara
		8	Peyad
8	TRIVANDRUM		
		1	Christumangalam
		2	Kannammoola
		3	Kazhakkoottom
		4	Maruthoor
		5	Mukkola
		6	Muttada
		7	Thiruvananthapuram
		8	Vattappara
9	VELLARADA		
		1	Amboori
		2	Arattukuzhi
		3	Chemboor
		4	Kottukonam
		5	Manivila
		6	Perimbakonam
		7	Thettiyara
		8	Vellarada

AREA List with DISTRICT and churches

S.No.	AREA	DISTRICT		CHURCHES
1	BALARAMAPURAM			
		Ammanoorkonam		
			1	CSI Ammanoorkonam
			2	CSI Kulangarakonam
			3	CSI Mukkampalamoodu
			4	CSI Valiyarathala
			5	CSI Vellappalli
		Balaramapuram		
			1	CSI Aluvila
			2	CSI Aruvacode
			3	CSI Balaramapuram
			4	CSI Eduva
			5	CSI Eruthavoor
			6	CSI Aithiyoor
			7	CSI Muthuvalloorkkonam
		Nemom		
			1	CSI Ayanimoodu
			2	CSI Edacode
			3	CSI JAMM Pakaloor
			4	CSI Kalliyoor
			5	CSI Kudampannoor
			6	CSI Manaluvila
			7	CSI Neeramankara
			8	CSI Nemom
			9	CSI Mottamoodu
		Peringammala		
			1	CSI Bhagavathinada
			2	CSI Koliyoor
			3	CSI Nellivila
			4	CSI Palappoor
			5	CSI Parkerpuram
			6	CSI Peringammala
			7	CSI Poonkulam
			8	CSI Punchakari
			9	CSI Thettivila
			10	CSI Venniyoor
			11	CSI Zenai Vattavila
		Venganoor		
			1	CSI Anthiyoor HMS
			2	CSI Chowara
			3	CSI Kottukalkkonam
			4	CSI Mangalathukonam
			5	CSI Nannamkuzhy
			6	CSI Payattuvila
			7	CSI Punnakkulam
			8	CSI Venganoor
		Vizhinjam		
			1	CSI Chunnakkari
			2	CSI Kovalam
			3	CSI Mulloor
			4	CSI Muttacaud
			5	CSI Vawamoola
			6	CSI Venganoor Town
			7	CSI Vizhinjam
2	KANJIRAMKULAM			
		Chani		
			1	CSI Chani
			2	CSI Kallumala
			3	CSI Karichal
			4	CSI MaruthumKkoottam
			5	CSI Muzhakkolkunnu
			6	CSI Nediyakala
		Kodiyanoorkonam		
			1	CSI Asanvila
			2	CSI Chundavilakam
			3	CSI Kodiyanoorkonam
			4	CSI Kottappuram
			5	CSI Kottukal
			6	CSI Mannakkallu
			7	CSI Nellimoodu
			8	CSI Pappanamkonam Youtube
			9	CSI Ramapuram
			10	CSI Valanvila
		Nellikkakuzhi		
			1	CSI Anamaramvalichathil
			2	CSI Ettukutty
			3	CSI Kanjiramkulam
			4	CSI Kanjiramkulam Town
			5	CSI Kazhivoor
			6	CSI Kuzhivila
			7	CSI Mulluvila
			8	CSI Nellikkakuzhi
			9	CSI Vengapotta
		Paraniyam		
			1	CSI AHLMC Paraniyam
			2	CSI Arumanoor
			3	CSI Kuttaninnathil
			4	CSI Lourdipuram
			5	CSI MRM Karumkulam
			6	CSI Nakapuram
			7	CSI Panchikkala
			8	CSI Paraniyam
		Sittaram		
			1	CSI Chenkal
			2	CSI Kodithookky
			3	CSI Koliyakkonam
			4	CSI Kuntucoil
			5	CSI Poovar
			6	CSI Sittaram
			7	CSI Venkadambu
		Thirupuram		
			1	CSI Kanchampazhinji
			2	CSI Kanchipuram
			3	CSI Kanjiramthottam
			4	CSI Mankulam
			5	CSI Nediyavila
			6	CSI Olathanni
			7	CSI Peracode
			8	CSI Planthottom
			9	CSI Thirupuram
3	KATTAKADA			
		Anacode		
			1	CSI Anacode
			2	CSI Bethelpuram
			3	CSI Edacode (East)
			4	CSI Mankaramala
			5	CSI panniyodu HMS
			6	CSI Paramukal
			7	CSI Zionpuram HMS
		Changa		
			1	CSI Ambilikuzhi
			2	CSI Changa
			3	CSI Kazhakunnu
			4	CSI Kuthirakkulam
			5	CSI MazhuvancodeHMS
			6	CSI Vellanadu
		Irinchal		
			1	CSI Inchapuri
			2	CSI Irinchal
			3	CSI Kanakkuzhi
			4	CSI Kodukkara
			5	CSI Kokkottela
			6	CSI Paruthippally
		Kattakada		
			1	CSI Bethanipuram
			2	CSI Chamavila
			3	CSI Christugiri
			4	CSI Kattakkada
			5	CSI Kuzhalar
			6	CSI Malappanamcode
			7	CSI Nadukani
			8	CSI Paleli H.M.S
			9	CSI Poovachal
			10	CSI Puttumelkonam
		Kulathummel		
			1	CSI Kandala
			2	CSI Kollode
			3	CSI Kottampally
			4	CSI Kripapuri
			5	CSI Kulathummel
			6	CSI Nellikkadu
			7	CSI Puthuvaikal
			8	CSI Thoongampara
			9	CSI Villidumpara
		Plavoor		
			1	CSI Chandramangalam
			2	CSI Chempanakodu
			3	CSI Kunnanad
			4	CSI Palakkal
			5	CSI Plavoor
			6	CSI ThoduvettipparaHMS
			7	CSI Variyakonam
		Punalal		
			1	CSI Aruvikkamoozhi
			2	CSI Kaniyarkonam
			3	CSI Konniyoor
			4	CSI Punalal
			5	CSI Santhipuram
			6	CSI Vazhuthanamukal HMS
		Uriacode		
			1	CSI Kadukkamoodu
			2	CSI MadhalamparaHMS
			3	CSI Paramkuzhi
			4	CSI Ponneduthakuzhi HMS
			5	CSI Salem Mamkuzhi
			6	CSI Saronpuram
			7	CSI Sasthampara
			8	CSI Uriacode
			9	CSI Uriyacode, Village
			10	CSI UCM Vattavila
		Veeranakavu		
			1	CSI Canan Hill
			2	CSI Chettikkunnu
			3	CSI Fosterpuram
			4	CSI Kallamam
			5	CSI Kallikadu
			6	CSI Mampally
			7	CSI Neyyardam
			8	CSI Swarnacode
			9	CSI Veeranakavu
4	NEDUMANGADU			
		AruvikKara		
			1	CSI Alayathazha HMS
			2	CSI Aruvikkara
			3	CSI Edamonmughal HMS
			4	CSI Gothambi HMS
			5	CSI Kadamparakunnu
			6	CSI Kottavila HMS
			7	CSI Mailadumpara
			8	CSI Mulamukku
			9	CSI Mundela
			10	CSI Parakonam
			11	CSI Pulacha HMS
			12	CSI Velloorkonam
			13	CSI Vembannoor
		Elavattom		
			1	CSI Alumkuzhy
			2	CSI Arampally HMS
			3	CSI Attukal
			4	CSI Elavattom
			5	CSI Koraliyode
			6	CSI Mankuzhy
			7	CSI Panavoor
			8	CSI Vanchuvam
		Manoorkonam		
			1	CSI Kuriyathi HMS
			2	CSI Makudagiri
			3	CSI Malayadi
			4	CSI Manalayam
			5	CSI Manoorkonam
			6	CSI Panacode
			7	CSI Thallachira
		Nedumangadu		
			1	CSI Anad
			2	CSI Chellamcode
			3	CSI Karipoor
			4	CSI Mukkolakkal
			5	CSI Nedumangadu
			6	CSI Ottakombu
			7	CSI PoovathoorNorth
			8	CSI Puthenpalam
			9	CSI Salempuri
			10	CSI Thettikunnu
			11	CSI Thiruchittoor
			12	CSI Vengarathala
		Parandode		
			1	CSI Aryanadu Town
			2	CSI Cherappally HMS
			3	CSI Malayantheri
			4	CSI Meenankal HMS
			5	CSI Paramukku
			6	CSI Parandode
			7	CSI Pongodu
		Perayam		
			1	CSI Bharathannoor
			2	CSI Choodal
			3	CSI Kakkanikkara
			4	CSI Kuruvilanchal
			5	CSI Meenmutti HMS
			6	CSI Palode
			7	CSI Perayam New
			8	CSI Perayam
			9	CSI Perayam Town
		Puthukulangara		
			1	CSI Kanjirampara
			2	CSI Nallikuzhi
			3	CSI Pooppuram
			4	CSI Puthukkulangara
			5	CSI Uzhamalakkal
			6	CSI Zionpuram
		Vithura		
			1	CSI Adipparampu HMS
			2	CSI Anappara
			3	CSI Bonacadu
			4	CSI Braimoor
			5	CSI Chayam
			6	CSI Idinjar
			7	CSI Kallar HMS
			8	CSI Mankayam
			9	CSI Maruthamala HMS
			10	CSI Mirchingston
			11	CSI Peringammala
			12	CSI Ponmudi
			13	CSI Ponnamchundu
			14	CSI Vithura
		Zionkunnu		
			1	CSI Elavoorkkarikkakom
			2	CSI Karamcode
			3	CSI Keezhaikonam
			4	CSI Mirhirmala
			5	CSI Muchanoor
			6	CSI Narikkal
			7	CSI Neduveli
			8	CSI Pulimath
			9	CSI Thekkada
			10	CSI Thoppuvila
			11	CSI Zionkunnu
5	NEYYATTINKARA			
		Amaravila		
			1	CSI Amaravila
			2	CSI Ashapuram
			3	CSI Chaikkottukonam
			4	CSI Ismenipuram
			5	CSI Kudumbode
			6	CSI Kurumbal
			7	CSI Palappally
			8	CSI Pasukottukonam
			9	CSI Planchery
			10	CSI St. Luke Church
		Irumbil		
			1	CSI Irumbil
			2	CSI Nediyakala
			3	CSI Pottayil
			4	CSI Thavaravila
			5	CSI Thenguvilakkuzhi
		Kariprakonam		
			1	CSI Elavanikkara
			2	CSI Kariprakonam
			3	CSI Koovode
			4	CSI Mampazhakkara
			5	CSI Melariyode
			6	CSI Muttacadu
		Moolakonam		
			1	CSI Arumaloor
			2	CSI Cheenivila
			3	CSI Govindamangalam
			4	CSI Mannadikkonam
			5	CSI Moolakonam
			6	CSI Palkunnu
			7	CSI Perumalloor
			8	CSI Poovanvila
			9	CSI Pullayil
			10	CSI Punnavoor
		Neyyattinkara		
			1	CSI Aralummoodu
			2	CSI Chittacode
			3	CSI Christupuram
			4	CSI Manaloor
			5	CSI Neyyattinkara Metro
			6	CSI Neyyattinkara
			7	CSI Neyyanttinkara Town
			8	CSI Sharon Muttacaud
		Perumkadavila		
			1	CSI Acqudate
			2	CSI Ancode
			3	CSI Aruvikkara
			4	CSI Christhugiri
			5	CSI Chulliyoor
			6	CSI Manaluvila
			7	CSI Mannarakkonam
			8	CSI Marayamuttam
			9	CSI Melkonam
			10	CSI Myladumpara
			11	CSI Perumkadavila
			12	CSI Thottavaram
		Poovathoor		
			1	CSI Ambainthala
			2	CSI Kaippallikkonam
			3	CSI Kunnathukal Town
			4	CSI Manchavilakom
			5	CSI Mannamcode
			6	CSI Poovathoor
			7	CSI Thathiyoor
		Thozhukkal		
			1	CSI Chemmannuvila
			2	CSI Kalathuvila
			3	CSI Kunnuvila
			4	CSI Malanchani
			5	CSI Neyyattinkara Central
			6	CSI Perumpazhuthoor
			7	CSI Punnacadu
			8	CSI Thozhukal
6	PARASSALA			
		Arayoor		
			1	CSI Arayoor
			2	CSI Choorakkuzhi
			3	CSI Ittichivila
			4	CSI Kottamam
			5	CSI Kuruvikkadu
			6	CSI Kuzhinjamvila
			7	CSI Ponnamkulam
		Kakkaravila		
			1	CSI Kakkaravila
			2	CSI Kodankara
			3	CSI Kulathoor
			4	CSI Maradi
			5	CSI Manikettimavila
			6	CSI Sunago
			7	CSI Venkulam
		Maypuram		
			1	CSI Dhanuvachapuram
			2	CSI Madhavassery
			3	CSI Maypuram
			4	CSI Puliyaravila
			5	CSI Thunduvila
			6	CSI Udiyankulangara
			7	CSI Vandithadam
		Palukal		
			1	CSI Immanuel Parassala
			2	CSI Karumanoor
			3	CSI Kudavilakom
			4	CSI Malayadi
			5	CSI Neduvanvila
			6	CSI Palukal
			7	CSI Paruvila
			8	CSI Salempuri
			9	CSI Samudayapat
		Parassala		
			1	CSI AMC Parassala
			2	CSI Ambilikonam
			3	CSI Ayaimkamam
			4	CSI Ayira East
			5	CSI City Church Parassala
			6	CSI Inchivila
			7	CSI Karode
			8	CSI Kozhivila
			9	CSI Manaluvila
			10	CSI St. Pauls Mundaplavila
			11	CSI Mankuzhy HMS
		Parasuvaikal		
			1	CSI Adumancadu
			2	CSI Alampara
			3	CSI Kannamcode
			4	CSI Kottavila
			5	CSI Malamchuttu
			6	CSI Matrackal
			7	CSI Nediyamcode
			8	CSI Parasuvaikal
		Viraly		
			1	CSI Attupuram
			2	CSI Chalakkara
			3	CSI Heaven Hill Thekkuthai
			4	CSI Kottackakkom
			5	CSI Pattavila
			6	CSI Pozhiyoor
			7	CSI S. H. Karode
			8	CSI Sooryacode
			9	CSI Viraly
7	PEYAD			
		Aramada		
			1	CSI Aramada
			2	CSI Kunnapuzha (Paraikonam)
			3	CSI Kurattoor
			4	CSI Malamelkunnu
			5	CSI Pappanamcode
			6	CSI Peroorkonam
			7	CSI Poozhikkunnu
			8	CSI Punnakkamugal
		Erayamcode		
			1	CSI Chowalloor HMS
			2	CSI Christasramam
			3	CSI Chunnappara
			4	CSI Elacode West
			5	CSI Erayamcode
			6	CSI Kodungannoor
			7	CSI KulasekharamHMS
			8	CSI Malamugal
			9	CSI Olippuram HMS
			10	CSI Oonnanpara HMS
			11	CSI Pappad
			12	CSI Vellaikkadavu
		Kavalottukonam		
			1	CSI Ezhakode
			2	CSI Kavalottukonam
			3	CSI Kurakkonam
			4	CSI Manchadi
			5	CSI Maruthummoodu
			6	CSI Vattavila
		Malayam		
			1	CSI Choozhattukotta
			2	CSI Karattukonam
			3	CSI Malayam
			4	CSI Pamamcode
			5	CSI Plamkottumugal
			6	CSI Pottayil
			7	CSI Vizhavoor East
		Malayinkeezhu		
			1	CSI Anthiyoorkkonam
			2	CSI Kaithamkuzhi
			3	CSI Kannancodu
			4	CSI Karippoore
			5	CSI Kuriyodu
			6	CSI Machel
			7	CSI Malayinkeezhu
			8	CSI CSI Mamkunnu
			9	CSI Mavottukonam
			10	CSI Mullumala
			11	CSI Thimirichal
		Managad		
			1	CSI Karamana
			2	CSI Mangad
			3	CSI Poojappura
			4	CSI Puthumana
			5	CSI Thamarottukonam
			6	CSI Vizhavoor
		Mulayara		
			1	CSI Bethelgiri
			2	CSI Edamala
			3	CSI Gandhi Nagar
			4	CSI Kadampanadu
			5	CSI Mulayara
			6	CSI Nedumkuzhi
			7	CSI Oottukuzhi
			8	CSI Thekkumala
		Peyad		
			1	CSI Aletty
			2	CSI Aruvippuram
			3	CSI Cherucode
			4	CSI Kollamkonam
			5	CSI Kulumala
			6	CSI Kurisumuttam
			7	CSI Myladi
			8	CSI Peyad
			9	CSI Thinavila H.M.S
			10	CSI Vilappilsala
8	TRIVANDRUM			
		Christumangalam		
			1	CSI Alakunnam
			2	CSI Ayanicadu
			3	CSI Christumangalam
			4	CSI Kachani
			5	CSI PTP Nagar
			6	CSI Thombaikonam
		Kannammoola		
			1	CSI Aakkulam
			2	CSI Chavadimukku
			3	CSI Chennilode
			4	CSI Kannammoola
			5	CSI Rekshapuri
			6	CSI Sreekaryam
			7	CSI Valiyathura
		Kazhakkoottom		
			1	CSI Chempazhanthy
			2	CSI Chenkottukonam
			3	CSI Eastaffpuram
			4	CSI Kadinamkulam
			5	CSI Kazhakkoottom
			6	CSI Kulathoor
			7	CSI Mevalloor
			8	CSI Uppachi
			9	CSI Ulloorkonam
		Maruthoor		
			1	CSI Keraladithyapuram
			2	CSI Kulamvettivila
			3	CSI Malapparikkonam
			4	CSI Mangaram HMS
			5	CSI Mannanthala
			6	CSI Maruthoor
			7	CSI Thannipoika
			8	CSI Vettikkonam
		Mukkola		
			1	CSI Kallayam
			2	CSI Kidanguvila
			3	CSI Mukkola
			4	CSI Pezhumoode
			5	CSI Puravoorkonam
			6	CSI Variakonam HMS
			7	CSI Vencode
		Muttada		
			1	CSI Kavadithalakkal
			2	CSI Muttada
			3	CSI Nalanchira
			4	CSI Ulloor (Snehapuri)
		Puthukunnu		
			1	CSI Alathara
			2	CSI Avukulam
			3	CSI Meenara
			4	CSI Moozhicode
			5	CSI Pothencode
			6	CSI Pothencode Town
			7	CSI Puthukunnu
			8	CSI Velavoor
		Thiruvananthapuram		
			1	CSI Barton Hill
			2	CSI Holy Trinity
			3	CSI Jagathy
			4	CSI Kanjirampara
			5	CSI Karakulam
			6	CSI Kuravankonam
			7	CSI Lenin Nagar
			8	CSI Manacaud
			9	CSI M M Church
			10	CSI Nedunkadu
			11	CSI Peroorkkada
			12	CSI Thaliyal
			13	CSI Plamoodu
			14	CSI C.S.I Cathedral
		Vattappara		
			1	CSI Chirakkani HMS
			2	CSI Kazhanadu
			3	CSI Kodikkunnu
			4	CSI Kuttiyani
			5	CSI Mulamkadu HMS
			6	CSI Ozhukupara
			7	CSI Palayam Ketty
			8	CSI RTM Vettinadu
			9	CSI Sun Nagar
			10	CSI Vattappara
			11	CSI Vettinadu
9	VELLARADA			
		Amboori		
			1	CSI Amboori
			2	CSI Aruvippuram Moongodu
			3	CSI Bethel Kathipara
			4	CSI Chakkippara
			5	CSI Edavachal
			6	CSI Kumbachal
			7	CSI Kuttamala HMS
			8	CSI Nedumpully
			9	CSI Pantha
			10	CSI Parathy
			11	CSI Puravimala
			12	CSI Shalom Hills
			13	CSI Vazhichal
			14	CSI Nulliyode
		Arattukuzhi		
			1	CSI Arattukuzhy
			2	CSI Anappara
			3	CSI Churali
			4	CSI Kakkathooki/ Bethelgiri
			5	CSI Kathippara
			6	CSI Manali
			7	CSI Pannimala
			8	CSI Thekkupara
		Chemboor		
			1	CSI Chemboor
			2	CSI Keezharoor
			3	CSI Manakkala
			4	CSI Manchamcode
			5	CSI Plampazhinji
			6	CSI Poozhikkunnu
			7	CSI Valiyarakonam HMS
			8	CSI Valiyavazhy
			9	CSI Valicode
			10	CSI Vattakakkuzhi
		Kottukonam		
			1	CSI Ambalakala
			2	CSI Aruviyodu
			3	CSI Ayanikkala
			4	CSI Elluvilakam
			5	CSI Karakonam New
			6	CSI Kottukkonam
			7	CSI Kudayal
			8	CSI Nilamamoodu
		Manivila		
			1	CSI Bedhanya Kuttikkadu
			2	CSI Panchamoodu
			3	CSI Karikkamancodu
			4	CSI Kollayil
			5	CSI Kottackal
			6	CSI Kunnathukal
			7	CSI Manivila
			8	CSI Manoor
			9	CSI Mundomala
		Perimbakonam		
			1	CSI Chamavila
			2	CSI Kanacode
			3	CSI Kuruvadu
			4	CSI Manavari
			5	CSI Paliyodu
			6	CSI Perimbakonam
		Thettiyara		
			1	CSI Chilavoor
			2	CSI Christupuram
			3	CSI Kallimoodu
			4	CSI Kunthalacodu
			5	CSI Meenamchira
			6	CSI Meethi
			7	CSI Nellikamala
			8	CSI Pandimamoodu
			9	CSI Thettiyara
			10	CSI Thudali
		Vellarada		
			1	CSI Alicodu
			2	CSI Bethelpuram
			3	CSI Manathottam
			4	CSI Mullilavuvila
			5	CSI Muttachal
			6	CSI Nadarkonam
			7	CSI Nainamkonam
			8	CSI Panchankuzhi
			9	CSI Vellarada
			10	CSI Vellarada Town
			11	CSI Immanuel Muttachal

== Institutions under South Kerala Diocese ==
Medical College

- Dr. Somervell Memorial CSI Medical College, Karakonam

Nursing College

- CSI College of Nursing, Karakonam

Engineering College

- John Cox Memorial CSI Institute of Technology, Kannammola

Arts & Science College

- Christian College, Kattakada

Legal Studies

CSI Institute of Legal Studies Cheruvarakonam

The Institute at present is offering Three Year LLB Degree Course with an intake of 60 students and two streams of Five Year LLB course as BA LLB, BCom, LLB and BBA LLB with the intake of 60 students each

Higher Secondary Schools

- LMSHSS Amaravila
- LMSHSS Chemboor
- LMSHSS Vattappara Vattappara
- V.H.S.S for the Deaf Valakam
- Higher Secondary School Parassala (Unaided)
- C.S.I. Vocational High School for the Deaf Valakom
- Light to the Blind Varkala

High Schools

- Amaravila B.H.S.
- Chemboor H.S.
- Kollam Craven H.S.
- Parassala Samuel H.S.
- Parassala Tamil H.S.
- Vattappara H.S.

Upper Primary Schools

- Cantonment Trivandrum
- Kottukonam
- Parasuvaikal
- Perimbakonam
- Uriacode

Lower Primary Schools

- Anchumaramkala
- Amaravila
- Arayoor
- Arumaloor
- Attingal
- Boothemcode
- Cantonment Kollam
- Chathannoor
- Chemboor
- Chenkulam
- Chittumala
- Embilikonam
- Kakkaravila
- Kalayapuram
- Karacode
- Karumanoor
- Karichal
- Kilikolloor
- Kodankara
- Kottaikal
- Kollavamvila
- Kudumbannoor
- Kuttaninnathil
- Kureeppally
- Mangalathukonam
- Manoor
- Mannoor
- Maranad
- Maypuram
- Mayyanad
- Mulayara
- Muttakad
- Neyyatlinkara
- Nellikkunnam
- Odanavattam
- Palukal
- Panachamoodu
- Pattathanam
- Perinad
- Ponnamkulam
- Poovathoor
- Samuel L.P.S.Parassala
- Thirupuram
- Thozhukkal
- Uthiyamkulam
- Vakkom
- Varkala
- Vayakkal
- Venganoor
- Vilangara
- Villoor
- Viraly
- Divya Jyothi English Medium School, LMS Compound Thiruvananthapuram 4

Hostels

- LMS Wills Hostel for Men
- LMS Women's Hostel

== Administration ==
- Bishop - Rev. Dr. Prinstone Ben
- Diocese Secretary - T. T. Praveen
- Diocese Treasurer - Rev. Dr. Christal Jayaraj

== See also ==
- Madhya Kerala Diocese
- East Kerala Diocese
- North Kerala Diocese
- Kanyakumari Diocese
- Church of South India
- Christianity in Kerala
