= Michael John (bishop) =

Michael John (1925-2013) was the inaugural Bishop of East Kerala of the Church of South India:

John was born in 1925 at Valakom. He was educated at Serampore University and Union Presbyterian Seminary. John was ordained in 1953.He served in Cherthala, Ranni, Alappuzha, Olassa and Kottayam. He also served in Kuwait and Canada. He died in 2013.

== Notes ==
Church of England titles
Preceded by Inaugural incumbent	Bishop of East Kerela; 1984 –1989	Succeeded by Joseph Samuel
