= William Paul Vachalan =

CSI bishop

The Right Reverend William Paul Vachalan
- Bishop of South Kerela
- Church: Church of South India
- Diocese: South Kerela
- Installed: 1967

Personal details
- Died: 1972
- Buried: M M Church Cemetery
- Residence: Trivandrum
- Children: Daughter - Prema Frederick

William Paul Vachalan was a bishop in the Church of South India, the second Bishop of South Kerela.

Vachalan served with the Basel Mission. He was later Principal of the Kerala United Theological Seminary at Trivandrum.
