= Prinstone Ben =

CSI bishop

The Right Reverend Prinstone Ben
- Bishop of South Kerala
- Church: Christian
- Archdiocese: CSI
- Diocese: South Kerala
- Installed: 2025
- Previous post: District chairman

Personal details
- Born: Ben
- Denomination: christian
- Occupation: Bishop
- Profession: CSI

Prinstone Ben is a bishop in the Church of South India. Ben has been the seventh Bishop of South Kerala since March 2026.
