= George Daniel (bishop) =

George Daniel was the third Bishop of East Kerala of the Church of South India:

== Notes ==
Church of England titles
Preceded by Joseph Samuel	Bishop of East Kerela; 2007 –2019	Succeeded by V. S. Francis
