= Diocese of East Kerala of the Church of South India =

Diocese of the Church of South India in Kerala, India

Diocese of East Kerala
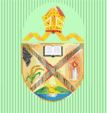

Location
- Country: India
- Ecclesiastical province: Church of South India

Statistics
- Congregations: 237
- Members: 65,000

Information
- Cathedral: Christ Cathedral Church, Melukavu

Current leadership
- Bishop: Rt.Rev.V. S. Francis

The East Kerala Diocese is one of the twenty-four dioceses of the Church of South India covering the eastern part of Kerala.The diocese headquarters is at Melukavu, Kottayam. The Church of South India is a United Protestant denomination.

== History of the Diocese ==
The Church Missionary Society began work in this area in 1848 and Rev. Henry Baker Junior came as the first missionary. He is now remembered as "The Apostle of the Hills". He taught Christian faith, doctrines to the community and helped them to liberate the clutches of exploitation of others communities. He began baptizing elders in the year 1848 and started the first church at Erumapara. Rev. Michael John was one of the pastors from Melukavu area, was appointed as the special officer for the formation of a new Diocese. He traveled far and wide and made consensus among the people and prepared them to form the Diocese. The 18th, session of the C.S.I. Synod decided to bifurcate the Diocese of Madhya Kerala and to form a new Diocese under the name 'The East Kerala Diocese', East Kerala Diocese was formed on Easter Sunday, 3 April 1983. Melukavu Christ Church became the Cathedral of the newly formed Diocese. The new Diocesan office was also inaugurated on the same day. Rev. K. Michael John was selected for the Bishopric and he was consecrated on 5 January 1984 as the first Bishop of the East Kerala Diocese. The works of the Holy Spirit benefitted a lot of people and elevated them to various fields of education, administration, medicine, etc. However the Malai Arayan community restrained itself from doing business and other activities such as money lending, liquor manufacturing and hospitality business, which was not allowed for Christians who lived by the word of God. Yehovah was kind to this community and elevated them to ranks so high that envied other communities. Sri. Joseph IAS, who comes from Kurinjiplavu near Moonilavu area went on to be the Chief Election Commissioner of Kerala State.

== Bishops of the Diocese ==
- 1984–1989: Michael John
- 1990– 2007: Kunnumpurathu Samuel
- 2007–2019: George Daniel
- 2019–present: V. S. Francis (consecrated 8 July 2019, by Thomas K. Oommen (Moderator) at Melukavu cathedral)

== Important Churches under East Kerala Diocese ==
- St Peters CSI Church, Erumapra

The St.Peters CSI church in Erumapra is the first csi Church in east Kerala.This church founded on 1849 by Rev.Henry Baker jr.

• CSI Christ Cathedral Church. Melukavu

The CSI Christ church, Melukavu became the cathedral church in 1983. When the east Kerala diocese was formed

- St Mathias CSI Church, Ellumpuram

The St Mathias CSI Church was founded on 1887 by Rt. Rev J M Speechly who was the Anglican Bishop of Travancore -Cochin Diocese during that period.

- St Lukes CSI Church, Koottickal

This church founded on 1852 by Henry Baker jr. The church was rebuilt on 2002.

- St. Marks CSI Church, Mukkulum, Elamkadu
- "St Pauls CSI Church, Meloram"

The church is located near the beautiful river.

- CSI Christ Church Toronto

The CSI Christ Church Toronto became the 2nd CSI Church in Canada and is known for its prestigious choir.

- St George csi church pallikkunnu

== Educational Institutions ==
CSI EAST KERALA DIOCESE give much importance to the basic education, higher education and technical education.

- Henry Baker College, Melukavu

Henry Baker College Melukavu, is a Christian Minority Educational Institution established, owned and administered by C.S.I East Kerala Diocese . The college was founded in 1981, providing two year Pre-Degree course of Kerala University. The college became a first grade college in 1999.

- CMS Higher Secondary School, Melukavu

The school was established at Melukavu in the year 1910 . The school was upgraded to Upper Primary in 1949 and as High School in 1968. Higher secondary courses were started in 1998.

- CMS High School Melukavu
- MDCMS High School Erumapramattom
- CMS High School Koovappally
- CMS High School Mechal
- CMS UP School Erumapra
- CMS UP School Edamala
- CMS UP School Elappally
- CMS UP School Mankompu
- CMS LP School Erumapra
- CMS LP School Chovoor
- CMS LP School Walakom
- CMS LP School Mechal
- CMS LP School Ellumpuram
- CMS LP School Adoormala
- CMS LP School Kannickal
- CMS LP School Koottickal

== List of District Councils under the Diocese ==
- Chelachuvadu
- Erumapra
- Kattappana
- Konnathady
- Melukavu
- Muvattupuzha
- Peermade
- Upputhara
- Vandiperiyar

== See also ==
- Church of South India
- Madhya Kerala Diocese
- South Kerala Diocese
- North Kerala Diocese
- Church of North India
- Christianity in Kerala
