= Chemmannar =

- Village
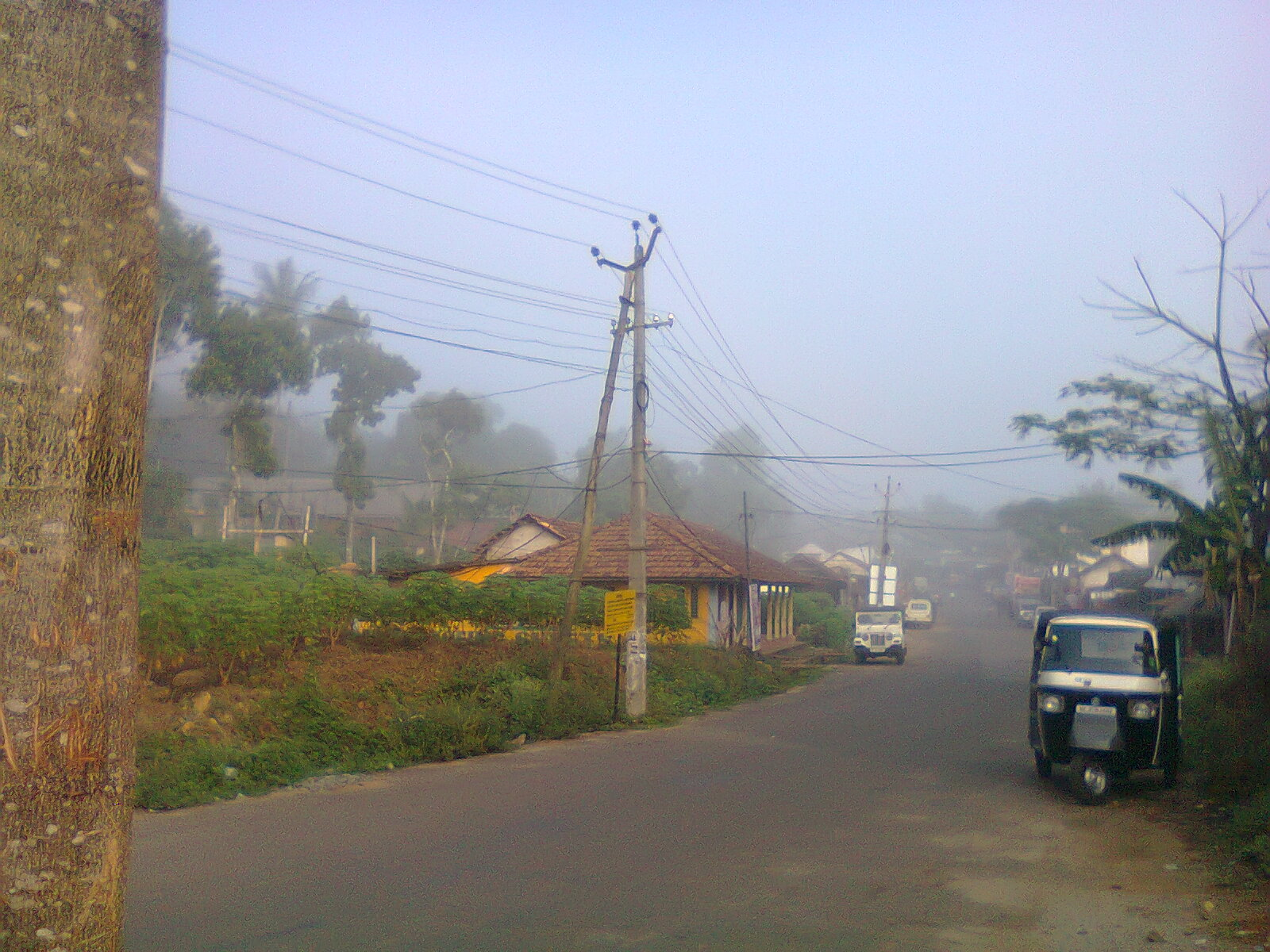

- Location in Kerala, India Chemmannar (India)
- Coordinates: 9.843°N 77.1519°E
- Country: India
- State: Kerala
- District: Idukki

Government
  - Type: Panchayath
  - Body: Udumbanchola grama panchayath

Area
  - Total: 51.95 km^{2} (20.06 sq mi)

Population (2011)
  - Total: 9,969
  - Density: 160/km^{2} (410/sq mi)

Languages
  - Official: Malayalam, English
- Time zone: UTC+5:30 (IST)
- PIN: 685554, 685566
- Telephone code: 04868
- Vehicle registration: KL-69, KL-37
- Nearest cities: Kattappana, Nedumkandam, Adimaly, Rajakad Kumily
- Climate: cold climate which may come down to 5c (Köppen)
- Website: www.lsgkerala.in/nedumkandamblock

Chemmannar is a village in the High ranges of Idukki district, Kerala, India.

== Geography ==
- Latitude:9.87858
- Longitude:77.193
- Pin Code:685554
- STD Code:04868
- District:Idukki
- State:Kerala
