= Choozhattukotta =

- village
- Location in Kerala, India Choozhattukotta (India)
- Coordinates: 8°26′36″N 77°0′28″E
- Country: India
- State: Kerala
- District: Thiruvananthapuram

Government
  - Body: Gram panchayat

Languages
  - Official: Malayalam, English
- Time zone: UTC+5:30 (IST)
- Postal code: 695571

Choozhattukotta is a village situated on the perimeter of Thiruvananthapuram, Kerala, India. It is located 9 km from Trivandrum Central.

The postcode of Choozhattukotta, Kerala is 695571.
