= Evangeline Anderson-Rajkumar =

Indian theologian

- Born: 19 March 1963; Bangalore, Karnataka, India
- Education: Mount Carmel College, Bangalore (BSc, 1983); United Theological College (BD); Tamil Nadu Theological Seminary (ThM); Serampore University (DTh); South Asia Theological Research Institute
- Church: Arcot Lutheran Church
- Ordained: September 3, 2006
- Offices held: Professor of Theology and Ethics, Serampore College. Professor, Theology & Women's Studies* United Theological College, Bengaluru
- Title: Reverend Doctor

Evangeline Anderson-Rajkumar (born 19 March 1963) is an Indian feminist theologian, Lutheran Pastor, and Dalit scholar.

She has taught at Serampore College, Serampore (1990-1994) and the United Theological College, Bangalore, (1999-2014). Evangeline Anderson-Rajkumar was the first permanent woman faculty to serve as faculty in the Theology Department of Serampore College.

She was the first Lutheran Woman to serve as first Vice President of the United Evangelical Lutheran Churches in India in 2006. She also served as President of the Association of Theologically Trained Women of India (ATTWI).

== Early life and education ==
Evangeline Anderson-Rajkumar was born on 19 March 1963 in Bangalore. She is the third daughter in a family of eight siblings, (six sisters + two brothers) and all eight siblings completed their theological education and entered various forms of ministry.

She went to Goodwill's Girls School and later joined Mount Carmel College, Bangalore where she obtained a BSc degree in 1983.

In 1984, Anderson-Rajkumar joined the United Theological College, Bengaluru and enrolled herself for pursuing the degree of Bachelor of Divinity (BD). She later left for Sweden in 1987 and pursued a one-year programme of the Church of Sweden in Gothenburg.

Anderson-Rajkumar returned to India in 1988 and pursued a Master of Theology in the discipline of theology in the Tamil Nadu Theological Seminary, Madurai, completing it by 1990. Later, Anderson-Rajkumar enrolled as a doctoral candidate at the South Asia Theological Research Institute (SATHRI) in Bengaluru and earned the doctoral degree of Doctor of Theology (ThD) in the discipline of Feminist Theology.

== Career ==
Serampore College, the constituent college of the Senate of Serampore College, Serampore, West Bengal invited her to be on its faculty. Accepting the offer, Anderson-Rajkumar left for Serampore in the year 1990 and taught Theology and Ethics. She later left for doctoral studies to Bengaluru in 1994.

Anderson-Rajkumar's alma mater, the United Theological College, Bengaluru, invited her to join as a member of its faculty. Since then, Anderson-Rajkumar had taught theology there.

== Resource person ==
=== The Institute of the Blessed Virgin Mary ===
Sisters of Loreto was founded by Mary Ward who have their Indian provincialate in Kolkata. They descended in India in the year 1842 and have their presence entirely in North India. Anderson-Rajkumar was invited in the years 2002 and 2003 to take up talks on re-reading the Bible.

=== Dharmararam Vidya Kshetram ===
Dharmaram Vidya Kshetram, Bengaluru is a pontifical atheneum with degree-granting authority validated by the Vatican. Anderson-Rajkumar also taught gender issues to the students there.

=== Federation of Asian Bishops Conference ===
In 2004, Anderson-Rajkumar delivered talks on Asian Feminist Christology at the Federation of Asian Bishop's Conferences in Bangkok, Thailand.

== Memberships ==
- Association of Theologically Trained Women of India (ATTWI); Anderson-Rajkumar is a member of ATTWI and was President of the association from 2002 to 2006.
- The Women's Institute for New Awakening (WINA); Anderson-Rajkumar has served as vice-president of WINA since 2000.
- Indian Theological Association (ITA)
- Globethics.net; Anderson-Rajkumar was a board member of Globethics.net Association from 2004 to 2008

== Senate of Serampore College ==
The Senate of Serampore College (University) (India's first University with degree-granting authority) took note of Anderson-Rajkumar's activism and made her a member on its Academic Council in 2005. She earlier served as a member on the Board of Studies for Theology and Ethics under the Board of Theological Education of the Senate of Serampore College (BTESSC), the regulatory body for theological education in India, from 2000 to 2003.

Anderson-Rajkumar is also the present Convenor of Board of Women's Studies of the BTESSC.

== Writings ==
=== Chapters ===
- Dear God, Reveal Your Name!, The God of All Grace: Essays in Honour of O. V. Jathanna, Edited by Joseph George, Asian Trading Corporation, Bangalore, 2005. ISBN 81-7086-360-0, ISBN 978-81-7086-360-1
- Christoph Stückelberger; J.N.K. Mugambi, eds. (2005). "Engendering Leadership: A Christian feminist Perspective from India". Responsible Leadership. Nairobi: Action Publishers. p. 168.
- Women's Movements in Mission: Some lessons for the Church Today, Re-routing Mission: Towards A People's Concept of Mission, Chraistava Sahitya Samithi, Tiruvalla, April 2004, pp. 39–60.
- Lalrinawmi Ralte; Evangeline Anderson-Rajkumar, eds. (2002). "New Eyes, New Reading, New Woman...". Feminist Hermeneutics. New Delhi: IWIT/ISPCK. pp. 102–114. ISBN 978-81-7214-710-5.
- Mission from a Dalit Perspective, Mission Paradigm in the New Millennium, Edited by W. S. Milton Jeganathan, Indian Society for the Promotion of Christian Knowledge, New Delhi, 2000, pp. 296–304.
- Rini Ralte, ed. (1999). "Gender and Identity". Envisioning a New Heaven and a New Earth. New Delhi: Indian Society for the Promotion of Christian Knowledge.
- William Carey's Mission of Compassion and Justice, Carey's Obligation and India's Renaissance, Edited by J.T.K. Daniel and Roger E. Hedlund, Council of Serampore College, Serampore, First published 1993 and reprinted in 2005, pp. 323–333.
- Sathianathan Clarke, Philip Peacock and Deenabandhu Manchala, ed. (2010). "Turning the Body inside out". Dalit Theology of the 21st century. Delhi: Oxford Publications.
- Snoek, Hans, ed. (2015). "Engaging the dis-ease of silence and passivity in church and society: New energy from rereading the Bible through a gender lens". In love with the Bible and its ordinary readers: Hans de Wit and the intercultural Bible reading project. Elkhart, IN: Institute of Mennonite Studies.
- "Womb: Is it inside or Outside? Reflections on the issue of Women renting their wombs" in The Yobel Spring. Vol 1 eds. Praveen PS Perumalla, et al., ACTC &ISPCK, Delhi, 2013, pp. 239–248.

=== Articles ===
- "Politicising the Body: A Feminist Christology". Asia Journal of Theology. 18 (1): 82. 2004.
- "Practicing Gender Justice as a Faith Mandate in India". Studies in World Christianity. 13 (1): 33–52. April 2007. doi:10.3366/swc.2007.13.1.33. ISSN 1354-9901.
- "Engaged Solidarity for Embodied Justice!". Dialog. 62 (1): 3–5. March 2023. doi:10.1111/dial.12772. ISSN 0012-2033.
- "The Violence of Silence: Reviewing the Church's stance on the issue of Domestic Violence". Asian Christian Review.
