= Charalkunnu =

Charalkunnu is a popular hill station in Thiruvalla Taluk, Pathanamthitta District of Kerala, India. The Pampa River flows in the low-lying areas. Pathanamthitta, the district headquarters, is situated 17 km to the south-east. Kozhencherry is located 5 km away.

It is around 10 km from Ranni and around 20 km from Tiruvalla.
