= Navamani Elia Peter =

Indian theologian and evangelist (1933–2025)

Deaconess Navamani-Elia Peter, MCI D.D. Honoris causa (Serampore) (2000)
- Born: Govada Navamani Kamalaratnam; 6 April 1933; Machilipatnam, Northern Circars, Madras Presidency, British India
- Died: 29 June 2025 (aged 92); Nadiad, Gujarat, India
- Burial place: Indian Christian Cemetery (Gate 1), Hosur Road, Bangalore
- Education: BSc (Andhra); BEd (Andhra); B. D. (Serampore)
- Alma mater: Lady Amphtill Government School, Machilipatnam; Hindu College, Machilipatnam; St. Joseph's College of Education for Women, Guntur; United Theological College, Bangalore
- Occupation: Priesthood
- Years active: 1980–2025
- Known for: Espousing women's leadership and mentoring youth
- Religion: Christianity
- Church: Methodist Church in India (MCI)
- Ordained: 12 January 1986
- Writings: 1989, Bible study: Practical exhortation: Hebrews 3:7–15; 1996, A Christian View of the Family; 1998, Biblical Paradigms for Women's Ministry in Asia; 1999, Woman! Reclaim your image!
- Congregations served: MCI-Indiranagar Methodist Church, Bangalore
- Title: Deaconess

Navamani Elia Peter (6 April 1933 – 29 June 2025) was an Indian deaconess, who espoused women's leadership in the church, focusing on Ordination of women in Christianity. She was in the forefront of the movement for gender equality since the eighties. Navamani held key positions of leadership globally. Peter was at the helm of leadership in multifaced Church-based organisations, notably the National Council of Churches in India, World Methodist Council, World Day of Prayer International Committee and Christian Conference of Asia.

In 2007 she was elected as President of The India Bible Society Trust Association, the first woman to hold the position since the inception of the trust in 1811. She held the position in Bangalore from 2007 through 2013. Navamani has been member of the Association of Theologically Trained Women of India and held the elected post of President for two bienniums.

From 2020, she spent her time writing motivational articles for the young generation to lead meaningful and better lives through The Upper Room.

== Early life and education ==
Peter was born in the port town of Machilipatnam in Northern Circars (Madras Presidency) in Colonial India on 6 April 1944. She did her schooling from Lady Ampthill Government School, Machilipatnam. For Undergraduate education, she studied at The Hindu College, taking a BSc degree, also in Machilipatnam. She also did her specialization in education from JMJ-St. Joseph's College of Education for Women in Guntur leading to BEd.

During the 1980s, she enrolled at United Theological College, Bangalore for spiritual studies leading to B.D. It was here that she was exposed to learned faculty comprising Joshua Russell Chandran, CSI, E. C. John, CSI, G. D. Melanchthon, AELC, Theodore N. Swanson, ELCA. The Cultural diversity at the campus enriched her learning experience. The presence of Carmelite Church Fathers among the college faculty, also provided her with an ecumenical exposure. After completion of her studies, The Senate of Serampore College (University), led by Registrar D. S. Satyaranjan, IPC, awarded her a B. D. degree.

== Career ==
Peter began her career as a Teacher in MCI–Stanley Girls High School, Hyderabad, beginning in the 1950s. Since the 1980s, her leadership in the Church made her take up greater assignments both nationally and globally.

Peter participated in a number of local and international institutional leadership and management meetings, notably the Ecumenical Association of Third World Theologians sponsored national consultation on women's perspectives held in India in 1984, the World Council of Churches Assembly held in Australia in 1991 and the World Methodist Conference held in Brazil in 1996. She was also at the United Nations Commission on Human Rights (Sub-Commission on Prevention of Discrimination and Protection of Minorities) at its forty-ninth session held in Switzerland in 1997.

=== Offices held ===
During the course of participation in international institutional meetings, Peter had been elected to the leadership of many global organisations worldwide.

- President/Chairperson
  - All India Women's Society of Christian Service (1980–1984)
  - All India Council of Christian Women (1982–1986)
  - World Family Life Committee of World Methodist Council (1986–1991)
  - Association of Theologically Trained Women of India (1990–1997)
  - World Day of Prayer International Committee (1990–1999)
  - The India Bible Society Trust Association (2007–2013)
- Vice-president
  - World Federation of Methodist Women (1986–1991)
  - Asian Church Women's Conference (1990–1994)
- Executive committee member
  - Evangelism Committee of Christian Conference of Asia (1982–1986)
  - The Fellowship of the Least Coin (1990–1999)

== Writings ==
The writings of Peter have been acknowledged by both Theologians and other Scholars. Paul Arasu Selvanathan as a 2017 doctoral student at the Comillas Pontifical University in Spain defines an Indian Family on the basis of Navamani's article. Pushpa Samuel of Fuller Theological Seminary, United States espouses ordination of women in the Mar Thoma Syrian Church through a 2020 article, citing the work of Navamani. Praisy David, a 2020 student of Indian Institute of Technology, Gandhinagar takes a cue from Navamani on espousing Gender equality, she quotes,

As Navamani E. Peter, in the introduction of the book Jesus Talks to Women writes that, Jesus saw women as intelligent, thinking humans, equal with men. His attitude with women was remarkable in a day when men thought women were a lower grade than themselves.

In theological matters, Sirirat Pusurinkham of the Presbyterian Church of Thailand was critical of Navamani's observation of a love story in the episode of Levite's concubine. Navamani's writings appeared in the public domain since the 1980s. She continued to write articles through The Upper Room.

- E. Peter, Navamani (October 1989). "Bible study: Practical exhortation: Hebrews 3:7–15". Asian Journal of Theology. 3 (2): 576–581.
- E. Peter, Navamani (September 1996). "A Christian View of the Family" (PDF). National Council of Churches Review: 258–ff.
- E. Peter, Navamani (June 1998). "Biblical Paradigms for Women's Ministry in Asia". Theology of Our Times (5): 99–101.
- E. Peter, Navamani (1999). "Woman! Reclaim your image!". In Kumari, Prasanna (ed.). Women in Church and Society: Essays in Honour of Florence Robinson. GLTC, Chennai. pp. 155–'ff.'.

== Death ==
Peter died on 29 June 2025, at the age of 92.

== Honours ==
In 2000, in recognition of women's leadership, the nation's first University, the Senate of Serampore College (University) conferred upon Navamani an honorary Doctor of Divinity.

Honorary titles
Preceded by K. J. Samuel; 2000–2006	President, Bible Society of India; 2007–2013	Succeeded by P. N. S. Chandra Bose; 2014–2019
Preceded by Padmasani Gallup; 1987–1990	President, Association of Theologically Trained Women of India; 1990–1997	Succeeded by Jessie Nesakumar; 1997–2002
