= Elizabeth Paul =

The Reverend Sister Elizabeth Paul
- Born: 28 February 1927; British India (now India)
- Died: 17 January 2001 (aged 73); Bengaluru
- Education: B.D. (Serampore)
- Alma mater: Selly Oak Colleges, Birmingham; United Theological College, Bangalore (External Candidate)
- Religion: Christianity
- Church: Church of South India Society
- Ordained: 25 April 1976, as deaconess by Bishop-in-Madras, Sundar Clarke, CSI; 24 March 1987, as parish priest by Assistant Bishop-in-Madras, H. S. Thanaraj, CSI
- Writings: Paul, Betty (October 1973). "Women and Church Administration". South India Churchman: 11–12. ISBN 9780664246013.
- Congregations served: CSI-St. Mary's Church, Chennai; CSI-St Andrew's Church, Chennai
- Offices held: Teacher, CSI-Monahan Girls Higher Secondary School, Chennai; Director, Christa Seva Vidhyalaya, Chennai; Member, Theological Education Fund Committee, World Council of Churches (1974); Visiting Lecturer, United Theological College, Bengaluru; In-charge, CSI-Vishranti Nilayam, Bengaluru
- Title: The Reverend Sister

Elizabeth Paul (28 February 1927 – 17 January 2001) was the first ordained woman in India. She was a sister of the CSI Order of Sisters in the Church of South India (CSI) who also taught at the United Theological College, Bengaluru.

== Beginnings ==
Elizabeth Paul was born on 28 February 1927 in India. She first taught at the CSI Monahan Girls Higher Secondary school in Royapettah, Chennai. Paul also oversaw the Gnanodaya Teacher Training Institute in St. Thomas Mount, Chennai.

Paul was sent for studies to the Selly Oak Colleges in Birmingham during the academic year 1961–1962, after which she became a tutor at Carey Hall at Selly Oak Colleges.

In 1964–65 she returned to Chennai and was made the director of Christa Seva Vidhyalaya, a missionary training centre founded in 1945 in the Women's Christian College, Chennai.

== Divinity ==
=== Studies ===
While Paul served as director of Christa Seva Vidhyalaya in Chennai, she registered as an external candidate to pursue the graduate course of Bachelor of Divinity (B.D.) with the Senate of Serampore College (University).

=== Sisterhood and ordination ===
The CSI Order of Sisters in the Church of South India was founded in 1952 Bishop Kenneth E. Gill remarks that it was a religious order for women missionaries, teachers and nurses from many traditions who wished to live by a simple rule. In 1966, Paul joined the CSI Order of Sisters in the Church of South India. Sundar Clarke, then Bishop – in – Madras of the Church of South India ordained Paul as a deacon on 6 May 1976.

Bishop Kenneth Gill writes that the Synod of 1970 of the Church of South India took up the question of ordination of women. The issue of ordination was debated in all the subsequent synods of the CSI of 1972, 1974, 1976 and 1978 and some even went to courts. It was not until 1982 that the Synod of the Church of South India voted with a two-thirds majority in favour of the ordination of women. It was in 1987 that Paul was ordained as a presbyter of the Church of South India and became a presbyter in the CSI Diocese of Madras serving as assistant pastor in Georgetown Church, Chennai.

=== Participation in debates ===
Paul participated in Diakonia World Federation Assemblies in 1963 and 1966 held at Berlin and Edinburgh and in 1976 became its vice-president.

In 1980, she participated in a conference of the World Council of Churches in Geneva.

== Death ==
Paul was looking after Vishranti Nilayam, the headquarters of the CSI Order of Sisters in the Church of South India when she died on 17 January 2001 due to a prolonged illness caused by a broken tooth.

== See also ==
- Muriel Carder
- Association of Theologically Trained Women of India
