= Mateer Memorial Church =

Building in India

Coordinates: 8.5091°N 76.9522°E

CSI Mateer Memorial Cathedral is a granite Hallenkirche-style Protestant cathedral located in Thiruvananthapuram, India. The present church building was dedicated on 1 December 1906 by the London Missionary Society (LMS) in memory of Rev. Samuel Mateer. It was constructed before the formation of the South India United Church (SIUC) in 1908.

Following the formation of the Church of South India (CSI) on 27 September 1947, through the union of the SIUC with the Anglican and Methodist Churches in South India, the church became part of the CSI.

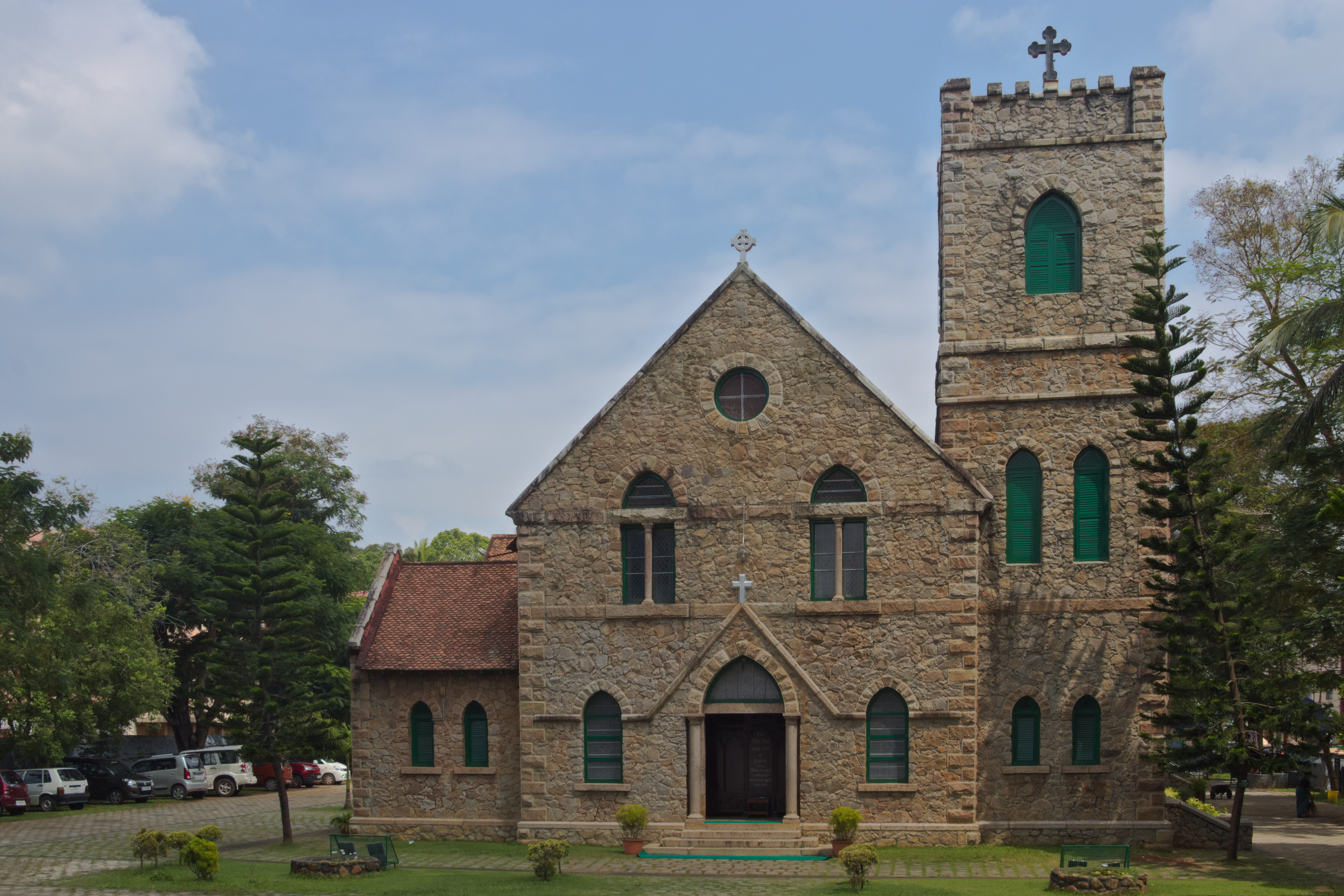
C.S.I. Mateer Memorial Cathedral,Thiruvananthapuram, Kerala

== Early history ==
The church's history started with the arrival of the Rev John Cox, the first London Missionary Society missionary in Thiruvananthapuram, in 1838. At this time local Protestants in Thiruvananthapuram worshipped in a church constructed by the Protestant Evangelical Trust in the 1830s.

=== Rev. Samuel Mateer ===
Rev. Samuel Mateer, after whom the church was named, was born near Boardmills in County Down. He was the first missionary who endeavored to grow an indigenous church. He prepared local people for church ministry and tried to transfer administrative responsibilities to them. It was during his tenure that a number of local people were ordained as ministers.

Rev. Mateer is seen as a pioneer of indigenization of the church. When he arrived there were 25 congregations, 3000 Christians and an annual income of Rs. 800/-. However, when he retired after 33 years, the number of congregations had increased to 56, Christians to 10,060 and annual income to Rs. 3000/-.

He wrote two books about his time in Travancore, Native Life in Travancore and The Land of Charity.

In 1890, Mrs. Mateer had to return to England owing to ill health. Rev. Samuel Mateer went to England in 1891 on leave, and died in Hastings on 24 December 1893. His five children were with him when he died. He is buried at Hastings Cemetery and Crematorium. It was in the same year that the Thiruvananthapuram Church was promoted to the position of a pastorate. The church building constructed in the LMS compound and dedicated to the memory of Mateer was opened for worship on 1 December 1906.

== Later history ==
Rev. Samuel Sumanam from Paraniyam worked in the church as an evangelist from 1878 onwards.

Rev.Mathew Kesari was the first Indian to be ordained as the pastor of that church in 1895. He retired in 1904 and his son John M. Kesari was the first pastor of the newly constructed Mateer Memorial Church, serving there from April 1905 to March 1913.

The last missionary of the London Missionary Society (LMS) in South Travancore was Rt. Rev. A. H. Legg. Following the inauguration of the Church of South India (CSI) on 27 September 1947, he was consecrated and installed as the first Bishop of the South Travancore Diocese. When the diocese was reorganized in 1959, he became the first Bishop of the South Kerala Diocese.

The Church of South India (CSI) was formed through the union of the South India United Church (SIUC), the southern dioceses of the Anglican Church, and the Methodist Church in South India, bringing together the Anglican, Congregational, Presbyterian, and Methodist traditions into one united church. .

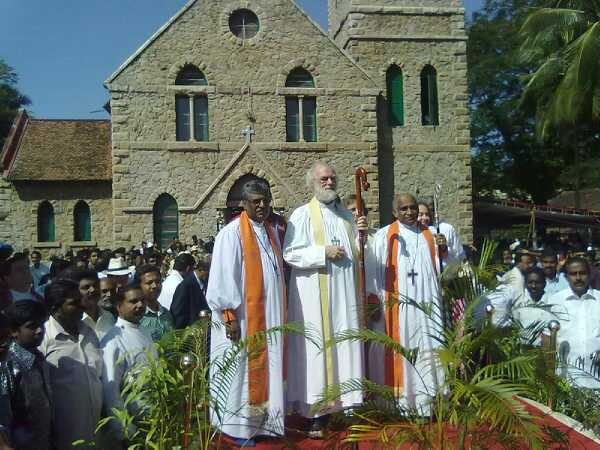
Then-Archbishop of Canterbury, Rowan Williams, visiting the church on his 2010 visit to India.

== Architecture ==
The architectural style used in constructing the church was Hallenkirche (hall church) style. The church building was made in granite, with a square bell tower with a vestibule beneath and a roof supported by gothic arches. The Celtic cross on the bell tower is made of cut stone, and commemorates Mateer's Irish background.

== Current activities ==
The church has several activities, including Youth fellowship, Young Family Fellowship, Sunday school, Senior fellowship and choirs in 3 languages. (Malayalam, English, Tamil)
