= B. V. Subbamma =

Indian theologian

The Reverend Sister B. V. Subbamma, AELC D. D. Honoris Causa (Serampore)
- Born: Bathineni Venkata Subbamma; 1 July 1925; Bodipalem in Guntur district (Madras Presidency) India
- Died: 12 January 2009 (aged 83); Guntur, Guntur district (Andhra Pradesh) India
- Education: B. A. (Andhra); B. Ed. (Andhra); M. A. (New York); B. D. (Serampore); M. A. (Fuller); Ph. D. (Wittenberg)
- Occupation: Missiologist
- Years active: 1950-2005 (55 years)
- Parent: Smt. Bathineni Seshamma (Mother)

Ecclesiastical career
- Religion: Christianity
- Church: Andhra Evangelical Lutheran Church Society
- Ordained: 20 February 1999
- Congregations: Rajahmundry
- Offices held: Senator, Senate of Serampore College (University), Serampore, Trustee, LWF-Institute for Ecumenical Research, Strasbourg
- Title: The Reverend Doctor

B. V. Subbamma also known as Bathineni Venkata Subbamma (1 July 1925 – 12 January 2009) was an Indian theologian and scholar. Noted for founding Christian ashrams, she was widely recognized for her analysis of Christianity from a cultural perspective. She was one of the first women in India to attain theological training and was one of the inaugural women pastors ordained by the Andhra Evangelical Lutheran Church (AELC) in 1999 at AELC-St. Matthews West Parish, Guntur.

== Biography ==
Venkata Subbamma Bathineni was born on 1 July 1925 in Bodipalem in the Guntur district of Andhra Pradesh, India to a family of traditional Hindus. After studying at a missionary school in Bodipalem, she went to the Government High School of Pedanadipadu. During her education, she resisted converting to Christianity because she believed that the Christian faith was only for outcastes. She believed that "Jesus was the lowest of all the gods". However, Rajagopal Ayyangar, her Brahmin high school teacher, encouraged her to read the bible instead of taking a stand against it. After reading the bible and reflecting on it, in 1942, despite the staunch opposition from her Hindu family, she converted to Christianity.

Continuing her studies, Subbamma entered the Andhra-Christian College graduating with a BA in 1947. She also earned a Bachelor of Education from St. Joseph's College of Education in Guntur and began teaching school. After nearly a decade of teaching, she enrolled in a master's program through the New York State University and graduated with her M.A. in Education in 1958. She returned to India and served as principal for Charlotte Swenson Memorial Bible Training School for another decade before deciding to pursue theological training, but continued to serve as principal at the school with 27 years of service. She entered the Andhra Christian Theological College in Rajahmundry, an affiliate of the Senate of Serampore College earning a Bachelor of Divinity in 1968. That same year in June, she founded a Christian ashram at Rajahmundry with the goal of helping women attain an education and become nurses, social activists and leaders. In 1969, she returned to the United States, completing a master's degree at the Fuller Theological Seminary in Pasadena, California in 1970 and then began studying for a PhD at the Hamma School of Theology at Wittenberg University in Springfield, Ohio. While she was in the U.S., she spoke at several Lutheran conferences.

After obtaining her theological training, Subbamma wrote extensively on colonialism, culturalism, Christianity and women's opportunity. She was recognized as "one of the most influential women leaders in the Third World Christian church", for her mission work and ministry. She focused on introducing Christianity to Hindu women, believing that an indigenous approach brought understanding and integration of cultures. From 1977-1984, Subbamma served on the Executive Committee of the Lutheran World Federation (LWF) in Geneva and was an honored guest as a pioneer in missions at the LWF's 50th anniversary convention held in Hong Kong in 1997. She served on the board of trustees of the Institute for Ecumenical Research in Strasbourg and was a member of the Senate of Serampore University, the first woman to hold a post on the university senate. In 1994, Serampore University granted her an honorary Doctor of Divinity degree.

Subbamma retired in 1985 but continued volunteering with the United Evangelical Lutheran Churches in India (UELCI) of Chennai. On 20 February 1999, she was finally ordained into the ministry, when the Andhra Evangelical Lutheran Church (AELC) allowed 17 women ordination. Of the 32 men and 17 women who were ordained, Subbamma was the oldest and was acknowledged to have been one of the first women who earned theological training in India.

She died on 12 January 2009 in Guntur.

== Selected works ==
- Subbamma, Bathineni Venkata (1970). Open Doors: New Patterns of Church Growth Among Hindus in Andhra Pradesh. Passadena, California: Fuller Theological Seminary.
- Subbamma, B V (1970). Daughters of the Church: Women and ministry from New Testament times to the present. South Pasadena, California: William Carey Library. ISBN 978-0-878-08306-0.
- Subbamma, B V (1973). Christ confronts India: indigenous expression of Christianity in India. Madras, India: Diocesan Press. OCLC 2001815.
- Subbamma, B V (1993). Christian ashrams: Years (1968-1993). India: Navashakthi Press. ISBN 978-0-889-46854-2.
- Subbamma, B V (2000). Vision and fulfillment. Tamil Nadu, India: Christian Ashrams. OCLC 608534564.

== Bibliography ==
- Bennema, Cornelis; Bhakiaraj, Paul Joshua (2011). Indian and Christian: Changing Identities in Modern India. Oxford, England: SAIACS Press & Oxford House Research. ISBN 978-81-87712-26-8.
- Hedlund, Roger E; Athyal, Jesudas M; Kalapati, Joshua; Richard, Jessica (2011). The Oxford Encyclopaedia of South Asian Christianity. Oxford, England: Oxford University Press. ISBN 978-0-198-07385-7.
- Joy, David; Duggan, Joseph F. (2012). Decolonizing the Body of Christ: Theology and Theory After Empire?. New York, New York: Palgrave Macmillan. ISBN 978-1-137-02103-8.
- Subbamma, B. V. (1975). "Evangelization Among Women". In Douglas, J. D. (ed.). Let the Earth Hear His Voice: International Congress on World Evangelization, Lausanne, Switzerland; Official Reference Volume; Papers and Responses (PDF). Lausanne, Switzerland: World Wide Publishing. pp. 765–773. Archived from the original (PDF) on 4 March 2016.
- Tucker, Ruth A.; Liefeld, Walter L. (2010). Daughters of the Church: Women and ministry from New Testament times to the present. Grand Rapids, Michigan: Zondervan. ISBN 978-0-310-87746-2.
