= Balarampur =

Balarampur or Balrampur may refer to the following places:

== India ==
- Balrampur, a city in Uttar Pradesh
  - Balrampur district, Uttar Pradesh
  - Balrampur Lok Sabha constituency
  - Balrampur, Uttar Pradesh Assembly constituency
- Balrampur, Ambedkar Nagar, a town in Uttar Pradesh
- Balrampur, Chhattisgarh, a town
- Balrampur district, Chhattisgarh
- Balarampur, Purulia, a town in West Bengal
  - Balarampur, West Bengal Assembly constituency
  - Balarampur, Purulia (community development block)
- Balarampur, Budge Budge, a town in West Bengal
- Balarampur, Koch Bihar, a village in West Bengal
- Balrampur, Mainpuri, a village in Uttar Pradesh
- Balrampur, Bihar Assembly constituency in Katihar district, Bihar

== Nepal ==
- Balarampur, Kapilvastu
- Balarampur, Rupandehi

== See also ==
- Balaramapuram, Kerala, India
- Balarampuram (Rowthulapudi Mandal), Andhra Pradesh, India
