= Lalitha Kumari (pastor) =

The Reverend M. S. G. Lalitha Kumari, CBCNC Ammagaru
- Born: Mutyala Sarah Grace Lalitha Kumari; 1 June 1942; Gunnanapudi, Krishna district, Andhra Pradesh
- Died: 25 September 2013 (aged 71); Secunderabad, Hyderabad district, Telangana
- Other names: Lalitha Krupa Rao
- Citizenship: India
- Education: Pre-university course, B. Th. (Serampore), B. D. (Serampore)
- Alma mater: Women's Christian College, Chennai (Tamil Nadu), Andhra Christian Theological College, Secunderabad (Telangana)
- Occupations: Pastor and Seminary Teacher
- Years active: 1964-2011 (47 years)
- Religion: Christianity
- Church: Protestant Convention of Baptist Churches of Northern Circars Society
- Ordained: 1992
- Writings: Fellow-Workers with God / దేవునితో జత పనివారు (1997), Acts of the Apostles / అపొస్తలుల కార్యములు (1999)
- Congregations served: Kakinada (Andhra Pradesh)
- Offices held: Teacher/Principal, Eva Rose York Bible Training and Technical School for Women, Tuni (1964-1968/1993-2011), Seminary Teacher, Baptist Theological Seminary, Kakinada (1975-1993)
- Title: The Reverend

M. S. G. Lalitha Kumari a.k.a. Lalitha Krupa Rao (1 June 1942 – 25 September 2013) was the eighth Principal of Eva Rose York Bible Training and Technical School for Women, Tuni. She held the term from 1993 through 2011. Lalitha was a theologically trained woman who also used to pastor a Church. With her ordination in 1992, she became the first Woman priest in the Protestant Convention of Baptist Churches of Northern Circars.

== Studies ==
After scholastic studies in schools established by Canadian Baptist Ministries in Gudlavalleru and Kakinada, she pursued collegiate studies at Women's Christian College, Chennai. She later enrolled at Eva Rose York Bible Training and Technical School for Women in Tuni, where she underwent propadeutic courses. Between 1971 and 1974, she again pursued theological studies at the Andhra Christian Theological College under faculty comprising Ryder Devapriam, CSI, B. E. Devaraj, CSI, Eric J. Lott, CSI, W. P. Peery, AELC, G. Devasahayam, AELC, R. R. Sundara Rao, AELC, Ravela Joseph, STBC, Suppogu Joseph, STBC, Muriel Spurgeon Carder, CBCNC, Waldo Penner, CBCNC among others.

This was the time when the Seminary was under transition from Rajahmundry to Secunderabad. Then Principals included the Old Testament Scholars', W. D. Coleman, AELC followed by Victor Premasagar, CSI. The Senate of Serampore College (University) awarded the degree of B.Th. by then Registrars Chetti Devasahayam, CBCNC and J. T. Krogh, NELC at its Convocation held on February 1, 1975 at Serampore College, Serampore where the Commemoration Mass was conducted by the Old Testament Scholar, G. Babu Rao, CBCNC, then Faculty Member of Serampore College at the CNI-St. Olave's Church, Serampore. She later upgraded herself from B. Th. to B. D. at her Alma mater.

== Career ==
She became a Bible Teacher at the School in 1964 teaching there between 1964 and 1968. The School was led by Ruth Fletcher who was succeeded by Winnifred Paskall. In 1975, she moved to Kakinada teaching wives of Seminarians at the Baptist Theological Seminary up to 1993,. She was ordained in 1992 becoming the first such Woman priest in the Convention of Baptist Churches of Northern Circars.

In 1993, with the sudden death of then Principal of Eva Rose York Bible Training and Technical School for Women, S. E. Krupa Rao, the Council of the Baptist Theological Seminary in the presence of LaVerne Louise and Ray Waldock, then India representatives of Canadian Baptist Ministries and G. Babu Rao, then Faculty Member of Andhra Christian Theological College, proceeded to announce the name of Lalitha Kumari as 8th Principal of Eva Rose York Bible Training and Technical School for Women, Tuni solely on merits of her being an Alumna of the school during the 1960s coupled with her theological education.

== Death and reminisce ==
Lalitha Kumari died on September 25, 2013 due to natural causes while on vacation at her Alumna, the Andhra Christian Theological College in Secunderabad. The same day, she was taken by road to Kakinada. The next day, on September 26, 2013, her Funeral mass was held at the CBM Cemetery in Jagannaickpur locality, where she was buried with ecclesiastical honours.

Educational offices
Preceded by S. E. Krupa Rao, CBCNC; 1989-1993	Principal, Eva Rose York Bible Training and Technical School for Women, Tuni, Andhra Pradesh; 1993-2011	Succeeded by D. J. Jeremiah, CBCNC
