= Tetagunta =

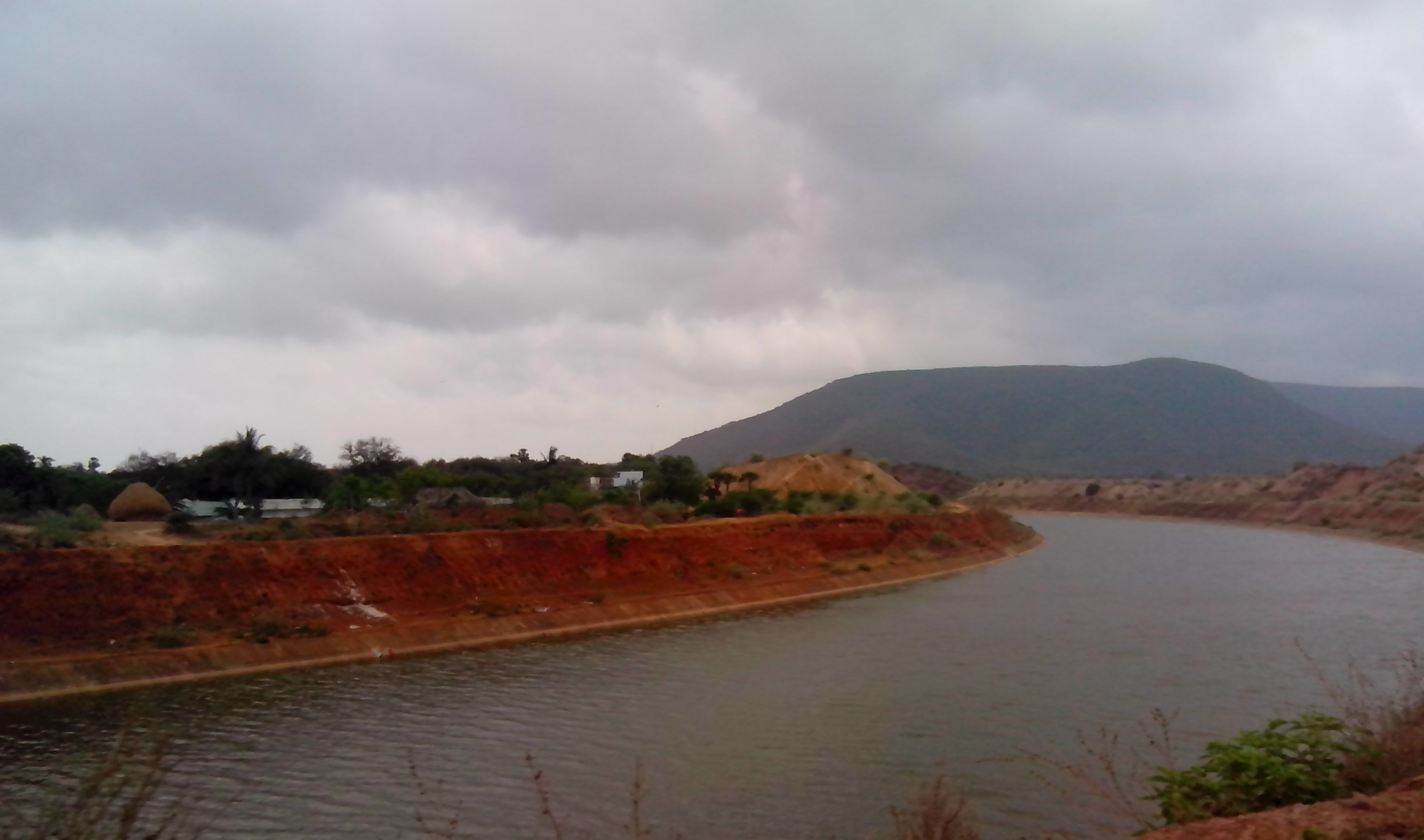
- Canal near Tetagunta-Lova Road
- Interactive map of Tetagunta
- Location in Andhra Pradesh, India Tetagunta (India)
- Coordinates: 17.314°N 82.443°E
- Country: India
- State: Andhra Pradesh
- District: Kakinada
- Elevation: 14 m (46 ft)

Population (2011)
  - Total: 11,967

Languages
  - Official: Telugu
- Time zone: UTC+5:30 (IST)
- PIN: 533406

Tetagunta is one of the villages in Tuni mandal in Kakinada district in Andhra Pradesh State and is located 14.1 km from its Mandal main city Tuni. It is 44.3 km from its district main city Kakinada. It has a population of 11,967 and people mostly depend on farming. Tetagunta village of Tuni Mandal is having the largest area of 4,033 hectares in the East Godavari District. It is located at a distance of 120 km from the state main city Visakhapatnam. Pincode:533406

== History ==
Tetagunta surrounded by the Eastern Ghats has some prehistorical evidences along with some traces of Early Jain rock beds.

== Localities near Tetagunta ==
Nearby villages of this village with distance are Srungadhara Agraharam (3.6 km.), R.B.Kothuru (4.3 km.), Chepuru (5.1 km.), Parupaka (5.5 km.), Gidajam (6 km.). The nearest towns are Thondangi (7 km.), Sankhavaram (7.4 km.), Routhulapudi (9.4 km.), Tuni (14.1 km.),

D.Polavaram, Dondavaka, K.O.Mallavaram, Kolimeru, Kothuru, and Kummarilova are the villages along with this village in the same Tuni Mandal.

== Transport ==
There are regular buses towards Kakinada, Rajamundry, Routulapudi, Janrdhanapatnam which are run buy the A.P.S.R.T.C a government owned organization. NH5 passes through this village serves nearby villages to sell their goods by Roadway. The nearest railway station is Timmapuram railway station where there are regular passenger trains towards, Visakhapatnam, Rajamundry, Kakinada, Vijayawada. For longer distances, the nearest railway station is Tuni which has Express services.

== Education ==
Schools nearby Tetagunta:-

1. ZP HIGH SCHOOL, Tetagunta

2. S.C.S.R.MPL.HIGH SCHOOL, 21st WARD, Tetagunta

Colleges nearby Tetagunta:-

1. Spaces Degree College Address : pl puram; NH—5; tuni—533401; e.g.dist..

2. Siddhartha Degree College Address : durgadas street; tuni—533401; e.g.dist..

3. GOVT JUNIOR COLLEGE (GIRLS) TUNI

4. Sri Satya Sai Vidya Vihar, Annavaram

== Local Temples ==
1. Lord Shiva Temple

2. Lord Nukalamma Temple (Grama Devata)

3. Lord Kanaka Durga Temple

4. Lord Vinayaka Temple

5. Lord Sri Rama Temple

6. Lord Krishna Temple

7. Lord Adavi Rajulu Temple

8. Lord Sai Baba Temple

== Tourism ==
Nearby Tourist Places:-

Tetagunta Lord Shiva "UMAMAHESHWARA TEMPLE" it is famous temple

Kakinada 45 km near

Rajamundry 86 km near

Konaseema 97 km near

Visakhapatnam 119 km near

Papi Kondalu 112 km near

Annavaram 5 km near

Talupulamma Lova 15.8 km near

== Districts ==
Nearby Districts:-

East Godavari district 50 km near

Visakhapatnam district 107 km near

Vizianagaram district 154 km near

== Banks ==
1)CANARA BANK

IFSC Code: CNRB0003750

Address: CANARA BANK, AT TETAGUNTA JUNCTION NH-16, TUNI MANDAL, TETAGUNTA, 533406, KAKINADA district, ANDHRA PRADESH.
