= Eva Rose York Bible Training and Technical School for Women =

- Latin: EVA ROSE YORK DISCIPLINA BIBLIA ET TECHNICA SCHOLA ENIM FEMINA
- Motto: The entrance of thy words giveth light..
- Founder: Canadian Baptist Ministries
- Established: 1922; 104 years ago
- Mission: Women's development
- Focus: Life skill training
- Chair: Rev. K. J. Emmanuel, CBCNC (chairperson of the Seminary Council)
- Principal: Rev. D. J. Jeremiah, CBCNC
- Faculty: Rev. S. Prema Kumari, CBCNC, Rev. B. Kumari, CBCNC; Smt. B. Bhogam
- Address: Tuni, Kakinada district, Andhra Pradesh, India
- Location: Tuni, India
- Coordinates: 17°21′45″N 82°32′38″E
- Interactive map of Eva Rose York Bible Training and Technical School for Women

Eva Rose York Bible Training and Technical School for Women was founded in 1922 by the Canadian Baptist Mission (CBM). The school is in Tuni in Andhra Pradesh, India.

== Background ==
Missionaries of the Canadian Baptist Mission were involved in spreading awareness about the Bible in northern circars of Andhra Pradesh. The missionaries began arriving in India as early as 1868.

Early missionaries involved women to initiate the Gospel.

Winfred Eaton, a missionary of the Canadian Baptist Mission began classes in Palakonda in 1922 with a few girls. In 1925, the school was relocated to Tuni.

=== Name ===
Eva Rose (née Fitch) York (1858–1938) was an early Canadian composer and teacher who lent support for the buildings on the campus in Tuni.

Eva Rose Fitch was born in Norwich, Ontario, where she attended college and married Dr. Winford York in 1879. She studied music and, after her husband died in 1880, took up the study of the organ and became a born-again Christian. She founded choirs in Belleville and Toronto before she decided in 1899 to devote her time to establishing a home, Redemption House, for unwed mothers in Toronto. York founded a home for the women that she ran until 1914 before she left to spend 15 years as an itinerant preacher. Her efforts have caused her name to be immortalised here, and her talents as a poet have also kept her memory.

The school is partly supported by funds raised in Canada by Baptist women.

In 1987 technical courses were begun when Jessie Rosser was principal.

== Administration ==
Principals of CBM-Eva Rose York Bible Training and Technical School for Women, Tuni, A.P. (India)
- 1922–1941 Sr. Winnifred Eaton, CBM
- 1941–1961 Sr. Mattie E. Curry, CBM
- 1962–1967 Sr. Ruth Fletcher, CBM
- 1968–1974 Sr. Winnifred Paskall, CBM
- 1974–1987 Sr. Jessie Rosser, CBM
- 1987–1989 Sr. Mildred H. Law, CBM
- 1989–1993 Rev. S. E. Krupa Rao, CBCNC
- 1993–2011 Rev. M. S. G. Lalitha Kumari, CBCNC
- 2011–2015 Rev. D. J. Jeremiah, CBCNC

Since the missionary days, the school was run independently. However, since 1989, the school fell under the purview of the Seminary Council of the Baptist Theological Seminary, Kakinada. Rev. K.J. Emmanuel heads the Seminary Council. Rev. D.J. Jeremiah is the present principal of the school.

The Canadian Baptist Ministries past overseers in India, Rev. G. Babu Rao and M. David K. Sarma, were also responsible for the functioning of the school.

== Courses offered ==
- Diploma in Evangelism and Mission (2 years)
- Tailoring (1 year)
- Typing (6 months)
