= Santha Pydipala =

- village
- Interactive map of Santha Pydipala
- Location in Andhra Pradesh, India Santha Pydipala (India)
- Coordinates: 17.4063°N 82.3521°E
- Country: India
- State: Andhra Pradesh
- District: Kakinada

Population (2011)
  - Total: 2,196

Languages
  - Official: Telugu
- Time zone: UTC+5:30 (IST)
- Postal code: 533 446
- PIN code: 533446

Santha Pydipala is a village in Rowthulapudi Mandal in Kakinada district of Andhra Pradesh, India. It is close to the towns of Tuni and Annavaram. Its PIN code is 533446. The main occupation of the people is agriculture and stone crushers.

== Demographics ==
As of the 2011 India census, Santha Pydipala had a population of 2,196, out of which 1080 were male and 1116 were female. The population of children below 6 years of age was 237. The literacy rate of the village is 51.15%.

== Gallery ==
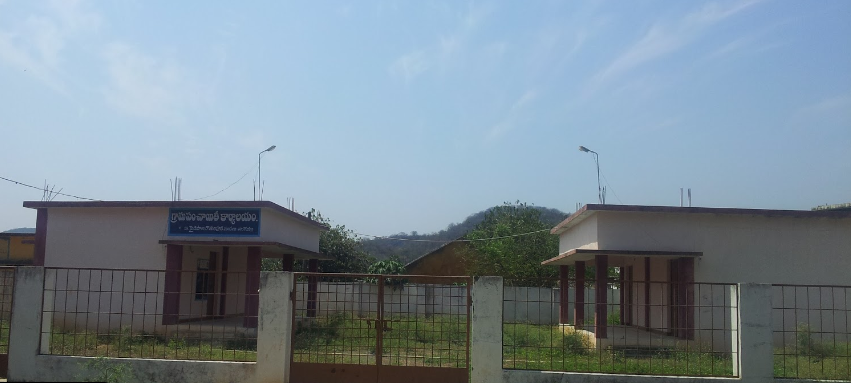
Panchayathi Building

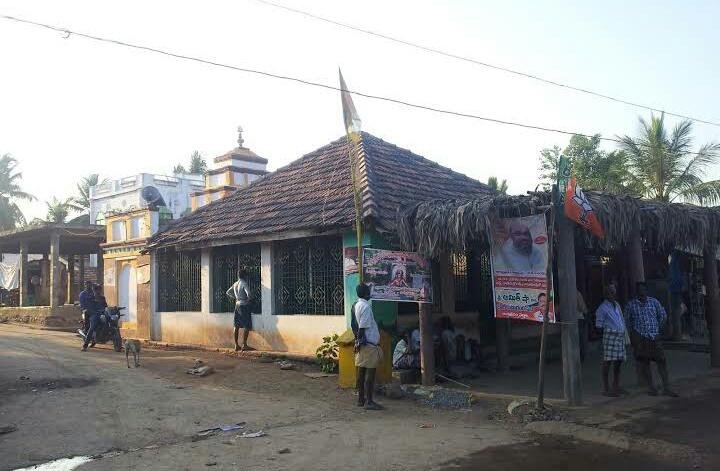
Ramalayam Temple
