= Jessie Rosser =

Canadian missionary

Sr. Jessie Rosser, CBM Ammagaru
- Born: Jessie Rosser; November 2, 1921; St. Thomas, Ontario
- Died: May 7, 2013 (aged 91); St. Thomas, Ontario
- Education: B.A. (McMaster), M.A. (Crozer)
- Alma mater: McMaster University, Hamilton, Canada; Crozer Theological Seminary, Upland, Pennsylvania, United States
- Occupations: Missionary, Canadian Baptist Ministries
- Years active: 1948 to 1987 in India (40 years)
- Known for: Her work at the C.B.M. Jubilee Secondary and Training School for Women, Kakinada and the Eva Rose York Bible Training and Technical School for Women in Tuni
- Parent: J. M. Rosser
- Religion: Christianity
- Church: Canadian Baptist Ministries
- Offices held: Principal, CBM-Eva Rose York Bible Training and Technical School for Women, Kakinada, (1974-1987)
- Title: Sister

Jessie Rosser (born 1921;died 2013) was a Missionary of the Canadian Baptist Ministries who served in India for over 40 years and was Principal of the Eva Rose York Bible Training and Technical School for Women in Tuni, Andhra Pradesh.

Jessie worked as a school teacher at St. Thomas, Ontario for some time and then studied social sciences at the McMaster University from where she graduated in 1947 with a B.A. and decided to serve the cause of people in difficult circumstances overseas. She came to India in 1947 and served as a Missionary in Kakinada, Vuyyuru, and Tuni.

In 1987, the Canadian Baptist Ministries recognised the services of Jessie Rosser as a missionary to India by then General Secretary of the Canadian Baptist Ministries, Robert C. Berry who presented Jessie with a pin acknowledging her 40-year service.

When Jessie Rosser came to India during 1947/1948, the members of the Centre Street Baptist Church in St. Thomas, Ontario formed a Jessie Rosser Mission Circle in honour of her. In 2009, the circle members comprising 10 ladies visited India to see the places where Jessie Rosser served, especially the Eva Rose York Bible Training and Technical School for Women in Tuni.

Educational offices
Preceded by Winnifred Paskall; 1968-1974	Principal, Eva Rose York Bible Training and Technical School for Women, Tuni, Andhra Pradesh, India; 1974-1987	Succeeded by Mildred H. Law, 1987-1989
