= Mildred Law =

Canadian missionary (1924–2014)

Sr. Mildred Hazel Law, CBM Ammagaru
- Born: 1924; Glenvale, New Brunswick, Canada
- Died: November 18, 2014 (aged 89–90); Sussex, New Brunswick, Canada
- Other name: Mildred Ammagaru
- Education: B. Th. (Tyndale); B. A (Acadia)
- Alma mater: Hampton Consolidated School, Hampton (New Brunswick); Toronto Bible School, Toronto (Ontario); Acadia University, Wolfville (Nova Scotia)
- Occupations: Missionary, Canadian Baptist Ministries
- Years active: 1953-1989 (36 years)
- Known for: Social work through Eva Rose York Bible Training and Technical School for Women in Tuni
- Parent(s): Laura Mae (nee Patterson) and William Ira Law
- Religion: Christianity
- Church: Canadian Baptist Ministries
- Offices held: Principal, CBM-Eva Rose York Bible Training and Technical School for Women, Kakinada, (1987-1989)
- Title: Sister

Mildred Hazel Law (1924 – November 18, 2014) was a missionary of the Canadian Baptist Ministries. Mildred came to India in 1953 and served in the northern coastal districts of Andhra Pradesh, especially at the Eva Rose York Bible Training and Technical School for Women in Tuni.

After early schooling at the Hampton Consolidated School, Mildred discerned her avocation and moved to the Toronto Bible School. She later studied at the Acadia University from where she graduated in 1953 and then came to India as a Missionary of the Canadian Baptist Ministries.

Mildred served in diverse ministries in India. She was in charge of Sunday School work of the Convention of Baptist Churches of Northern Circars and last served as Principal of the Eva Rose York Bible Training and Technical School for Women in Tuni succeeding Jessie Rosser in 1987 until 1989, the year in which she returned to her homeland in New Brunswick. The work and the name of Mildred has remained in the areas where she served.

Educational offices
Preceded by Jessie Rosser; 1974-1987	Principal, Eva Rose York Bible Training and Technical School for Women, Tuni, Andhra Pradesh, India; 1987-1989	Succeeded by S. E. Krupa Rao, 1989-1993
