= Mattie Curry =

Mattie E. Curry
- Born: Canada
- Other names: Curry-Amma
- Occupations: Missionary, Canadian Baptist Ministries
- Years active: 1924-1964
- Known for: Her work at the Eva Rose York Bible Training and Technical School for Women in Tuni

Mattie E. Curry was the second Principal of the Eva Rose York Bible Training and Technical School for Women in Tuni.

After graduate studies at the Acadia University where she took a B.A., Curry moved to the Gordon–Conwell Theological Seminary studying for a B. Th.

Educational offices
Preceded by Winnifred Eaton; 1922-1941	Principal, Eva Rose York Bible Training and Technical School for Women, Tuni, Andhra Pradesh, India; 1941-1961	Succeeded by Ruth Fletcher, 1962-1967
