= Pedduru, Kakinada District =

Pedduru
- village
- Interactive map of Pedduru
- Location in Andhra Pradesh, India Pedduru (India)
- Coordinates: 17.2735°N 82.5562°E
- Country: India
- State: Andhra Pradesh
- District: Kakinada

Area
  - Total: 0.85 km^{2} (0.33 sq mi)

Population (2011)
  - Total: 156
  - Density: 184/km^{2} (480/sq mi)

Languages
  - Official: Telugu
- Time zone: UTC+5:30 (IST)
- Postal code: 533 446

Pedduru is a village in Rowthulapudi Mandal, Kakinada district in the state of Andhra Pradesh in India.

== Geography ==
Pedduru is located at 17.2735°N 82.5562°E.

== Demographics ==
As of 2011 India census, Pedduru had a population of 156, out of which 77 were male and 79 were female. Population of children below 6 years of age were 23. The literacy rate of the village is 25.56%.
