= Winnifred Eaton =

Winnifred Eaton may refer to:

- Winnifred Eaton (writer) (1875–1954), Canadian author. Although she was of Chinese-British ancestry, she published under the Japanese pseudonym Onoto Watanna
- Winnifred Eaton (missionary), the first Principal of the Eva Rose York Bible Training and Technical School for Women in Tuni
