= Tuni mandal =

- Mandal
- Interactive Map Outlining mandal
- Country: India
- State: Andhra Pradesh
- District: Kakinada
- Time zone: UTC+5:30 (IST)

Tuni mandal is one of the 21 mandals in Kakinada District of Andhra Pradesh. As per census 2011, there are 1 town and 20 villages.

== Demographics ==
Tuni Mandal has total population of 138,079 as per the Census 2011 out of which 67,734 are males while 70,345 are females and the Average Sex Ratio of Tuni Mandal is 1,039. The total literacy rate of Tuni Mandal is 64.64%. The male literacy rate is 61.72% and the female literacy rate is 53.62%.

== Towns and villages ==
=== Towns ===
1. Tuni (Municipality)

=== Villages ===
1. Chamavaram
2. Chepuru
3. Tetagunta
4. Velama Kothuru
5. Suravaram
6. Kathipudi
