= Ginnelaram =

- village
- Interactive map of Ginnelaram
- Location in Andhra Pradesh, India Ginnelaram (India)
- Coordinates: 17.4542°N 82.2998°E
- Country: India
- State: Andhra Pradesh
- District: Kakinada

Area
  - Total: 0.5 km^{2} (0.19 sq mi)

Population (2011)
  - Total: 136
  - Density: 272/km^{2} (700/sq mi)

Languages
  - Official: Telugu
- Time zone: UTC+5:30 (IST)
- Postal code: 533 446

Ginnelaram is a village in Rowthulapudi Mandal, Kakinada district in the state of Andhra Pradesh in India.

== Geography ==
Ginnelaram is located at 17.4542°N 82.2998°E.

== Demographics ==
As of 2011 India census, Ginnelaram had a population of 136, out of which 64 were male and 72 were female. Population of children below 6 years of age were 6. The literacy rate of the village is 33.08%.
