= Diguvadarapalle =

- village
- Interactive map of Diguvadarapalle
- Location in Andhra Pradesh, India Diguvadarapalle (India)
- Coordinates: 17.3512°N 82.3796°E
- Country: India
- State: Andhra Pradesh
- District: Kakinada

Area
  - Total: 2.4 km^{2} (0.93 sq mi)

Population (2011)
  - Total: 130
  - Density: 54/km^{2} (140/sq mi)

Languages
  - Official: Telugu
- Time zone: UTC+5:30 (IST)
- Postal code: 533 446

Diguvadarapalle is a village in Rowthulapudi Mandal, Kakinada district in the state of Andhra Pradesh in India.

== Geography ==
Diguvadarapalle is located at 17.3512°N 82.3796°E.

== Demographics ==
As of 2011 India census, Diguvadarapalle had a population of 130, out of which 66 were male and 64 were female. The population of children below 6 years of age was 16. The literacy rate of the village was 32.46%.
