= Billavaka =

- village
- Interactive map of Billavaka
- Location in Andhra Pradesh, India Billavaka (India)
- Coordinates: 17.3253°N 82.4087°E
- Country: India
- State: Andhra Pradesh
- District: Kakinada

Area
  - Total: 6.18 km^{2} (2.39 sq mi)

Population (2011)
  - Total: 50
  - Density: 8/km^{2} (21/sq mi)

Languages
  - Official: Telugu
- Time zone: UTC+5:30 (IST)
- Postal code: 533 446

Billavaka is a village in Rowthulapudi Mandal, Kakinada district in the state of Andhra Pradesh in India.

== Geography ==
Billavaka is located at 17.3253°N 82.4087°E.

== Demographics ==
As of 2011 India census, Billavaka had a population of 50, out of which 34 were male and 16 were female. Population of children below 6 years of age were 2. The literacy rate of the village is 49.92%.
