= Rajavaram (Rowthulapudi mandal) =

- village
- Interactive map of Rajavaram
- Location in Andhra Pradesh, India Rajavaram (India)
- Coordinates: 17.0401°N 81.3718°E
- Country: India
- State: Andhra Pradesh
- District: Kakinada district

Area
  - Total: 9.29 km^{2} (3.59 sq mi)

Population (2011)
  - Total: 1,199
  - Density: 1,800/km^{2} (4,700/sq mi)

Languages
  - Official: Telugu
- Time zone: UTC+5:30 (IST)
- Postal code: 533407

Rajavaram is a village in Rowthulapudi mandal, Kakinada district in the state of Andhra Pradesh in India.

== Geography ==
Rajavaram is located at 17°26′49″N 82°24′18.2″E.

== Demographics ==
As of 2011 India census, Rajavaram had a population of 1,199.
