= Gidajam =

- village
- Interactive map of Gidajam
- Location in Andhra Pradesh, India Gidajam (India)
- Coordinates: 17.3479°N 82.3903°E
- Country: India
- State: Andhra Pradesh
- District: Kakinada

Area
  - Total: 7.75 km^{2} (2.99 sq mi)

Population (2011)
  - Total: 2,853
  - Density: 368/km^{2} (950/sq mi)

Languages
  - Official: Telugu
- Time zone: UTC+5:30 (IST)
- Postal code: 533 446

Gidajam is a village in Rowthulapudi Mandal, Kakinada district in the state of Andhra Pradesh in India.

== Geography ==
Gidajam is located at 17.3479°N 82.3903°E.

== Demographics ==
As of 2011 India census, Gidajam Village had a population of 2,853, out of which 1394 were male and 1459 were female. Population of children below 6 years of age were 343. The literacy rate of the village is 54.69%.
