= Raghavapatnam =

- village
- Interactive map of Raghavapatnam
- Location in Andhra Pradesh, India Raghavapatnam (India)
- Coordinates: 17.4623°N 82.3361°E
- Country: India
- State: Andhra Pradesh
- District: Kakinada

Area
  - Total: 8.2 km^{2} (3.2 sq mi)

Population (2011)
  - Total: 1,211
  - Density: 148/km^{2} (380/sq mi)

Languages
  - Official: Telugu
- Time zone: UTC+5:30 (IST)
- Postal code: 533 446

Raghavapatnam is a village in Rowthulapudi Mandal, Kakinada district in the state of Andhra Pradesh in India.

== Geography ==
Raghavapatnam is located at 17.4623°N 82.3361°E.

== Demographics ==
Raghavapatnam village has a population of 1211, of which 647 are male and 564 are female. The population of children below 6 years of age is 112. The literacy rate of the village is 48.41%.
