= Ramakrishnapuram (Rowthulapudi Mandal) =

- village
- Interactive map of Ramakrishnapuram
- Location in Andhra Pradesh, India Ramakrishnapuram (India)
- Coordinates: 17.4379°N 82.3959°E
- Country: India
- State: Andhra Pradesh
- District: Kakinada

Area
  - Total: 1.27 km^{2} (0.49 sq mi)

Population (2011)
  - Total: 489
  - Density: 385/km^{2} (1,000/sq mi)

Languages
  - Official: Telugu
- Time zone: UTC+5:30 (IST)
- Postal code: 533 446

Ramakrishnapuram is a village in Rowthulapudi Mandal, Kakinada district in the state of Andhra Pradesh in India.

== Geography ==
Ramakrishnapuram is located at 17.4379°N 82.3959°E.

== Demographics ==
As of 2011 India census, Ramakrishnapuram had a population of 489, out of which 248 were male and 241 were female. The population of children below 6 years of age was 47. The literacy rate of the village was 74.89%.
