= Srungavaram =

- village
- Interactive map of Srungavaram
- Location in Andhra Pradesh, India Srungavaram (India)
- Coordinates: 17.3388°N 82.3598°E
- Country: India
- State: Andhra Pradesh
- District: Kakinada

Area
  - Total: 8.9 km^{2} (3.4 sq mi)

Population (2011)
  - Total: 3,774
  - Density: 423/km^{2} (1,100/sq mi)

Languages
  - Official: Telugu
- Time zone: UTC+5:30 (IST)

Srungavaram is a village in Rowthulapudi Mandal, Kakinada district in the state of Andhra Pradesh in India.

== Geography ==
Srungavaram is located at 17.3388°N 82.3598°E.

== Demographics ==
Srungavaram Village has a population of 3,774, out of which 1886 are male and 1888 are female. Population of children below 6 years of age are 462. The literacy rate of the village is 48.52%.
