= D.Pydipala =

- village
- Interactive map of D.Pydipala
- Location in Andhra Pradesh, India D.Pydipala (India)
- Coordinates: 17.4210°N 82.3096°E
- Country: India
- State: Andhra Pradesh
- District: Kakinada

Area
  - Total: 8.21 km^{2} (3.17 sq mi)

Population (2011)
  - Total: 201
  - Density: 24/km^{2} (62/sq mi)

Languages
  - Official: Telugu
- Time zone: UTC+5:30 (IST)
- Postal code: 533 446

D.Pydipala is a village in Rowthulapudi Mandal, Kakinada district in the state of Andhra Pradesh in India.

== Geography ==
D.Pydipala is located at 17.4210°N 82.3096°E.

== Demographics ==
As of 2011 India census, D.Pydipala had a population of 201, out of which 100 were male and 101 were female. The population of children below 6 years of age was 15. The literacy rate of the village was 37.63%.
