= Sarlanka =

Village in Andhra Pradesh, India

- village
- Interactive map of Sarlanka
- Location in Andhra Pradesh, India Sarlanka (India)
- Coordinates: 17.4910°N 82.3366°E
- Country: India
- State: Andhra Pradesh
- District: Kakinada

Area
  - Total: 0.57 km^{2} (0.22 sq mi)

Population (2011)
  - Total: 163
  - Density: 286/km^{2} (740/sq mi)

Languages
  - Official: Telugu
- Time zone: UTC+5:30 (IST)
- Postal code: 533 446

Sarlanka is a village in Rowthulapudi Mandal, Kakinada district in the state of Andhra Pradesh in India.

== Geography ==
Sarlanka is located at 17.4910°N 82.3366°E.

== Demographics ==
As of 2011 India census, Sarlanka had a population of 163, out of which 81 were male and 82 were female. Population of children below 6 years of age were 25. The literacy rate of the village is 31.16%.
