= Venkatanagaram (Rowthulapudi Mandal) =

- village
- Interactive map of Venkatanagaram
- Location in Andhra Pradesh, India Venkatanagaram (India)
- Coordinates: 17.3614°N 82.3289°E
- Country: India
- State: Andhra Pradesh
- District: Kakinada

Area
  - Total: 0.8 km^{2} (0.31 sq mi)

Population (2011)
  - Total: 124
  - Density: 155/km^{2} (400/sq mi)

Languages
  - Official: Telugu
- Time zone: UTC+5:30 (IST)
- Postal code: 533 446

Venkatanagaram is a village in Rowthulapudi Mandal, Kakinada district in the state of Andhra Pradesh in India.

== Geography ==
Venkatanagaram is located at 17.3614°N 82.3289°E.

== Demographics ==
As of 2011 India census, Venkatanagaram had a population of 124, out of which 67 were male and 57 were female. Population of children below 6 years of age were 16. The literacy rate of the village is 43.52%.
