= Uppampalem =

- village
- Interactive map of Uppampalem
- Location in Andhra Pradesh, India Uppampalem (India)
- Coordinates: 17.3745°N 82.3199°E
- Country: India
- State: Andhra Pradesh
- District: Kakinada

Area
  - Total: 4.63 km^{2} (1.79 sq mi)

Population (2011)
  - Total: 505
  - Density: 109/km^{2} (280/sq mi)

Languages
  - Official: Telugu
- Time zone: UTC+5:30 (IST)
- Postal code: 533 446

Uppampalem is a village in Rowthulapudi Mandal, Kakinada district in the state of Andhra Pradesh in India.

== Geography ==
Uppampalem is located at 17.3745°N 82.3199°E.

== Demographics ==
As of 2011 India census, Uppampalem had a population of 505, out of which 259 were male and 246 were female. The population of children below 6 years of age was 57. The literacy rate of the village was 51.12%.
