= Gummaregula =

Village in Andhra Pradesh, India

- village
- Interactive map of Gummaregula
- Location in Andhra Pradesh, India Gummaregula (India)
- Coordinates: 17.3708°N 82.408°E
- Country: India
- State: Andhra Pradesh
- District: Kakinada

Area
  - Total: 4.2 km^{2} (1.6 sq mi)

Population (2011)
  - Total: 1,435
  - Density: 324/km^{2} (840/sq mi)

Languages
  - Official: Telugu
- Time zone: UTC+5:30 (IST)
- Postal code: 533 446

Gummaregula is a village in Rowthulapudi Mandal, Kakinada district in the state of Andhra Pradesh in India.

== Geography ==
Gummaregula is located at 17.3708°N 82.408°E.

== Demographics ==
As of 2011 India census, Gummaregula had a population of 1435, out of which 740 were male and 695 were female. Population of children below 6 years of age were 155. The literacy rate of the village is 60.08%.
