= Kothuru, Kakinada District =

Kothuru
- Village
- Interactive map of Kothuru
- Location in Andhra Pradesh, India Kothuru (India)
- Coordinates: 17.2958°N 82.4764°E
- Country: India
- State: Andhra Pradesh
- District: Kakinada

Area
  - Total: 8.44 km^{2} (3.26 sq mi)

Population (2011)
  - Total: 271
  - Density: 32/km^{2} (83/sq mi)

Languages
  - Official: Telugu
- Time zone: UTC+5:30 (IST)
- Postal code: 533 446

Kothuru is a village in Rowthulapudi Mandal, Kakinada district in the state of Andhra Pradesh in India.

== Geography ==
Kothuru is located at 17.2958°N 82.4764°E.

== Demographics ==
As of 2011 India census, Kothuru had a population of 271, out of which 127 were male and 144 were female. The population of children below 6 years of age was 16. The literacy rate of the village was 62.35%.
