= Jaldam =

- village
- Interactive map of Jaldam
- Location in Andhra Pradesh, India Jaldam (India)
- Coordinates: 17.4325°N 82.3070°E
- Country: India
- State: Andhra Pradesh
- District: Kakinada

Area
  - Total: 1.91 km^{2} (0.74 sq mi)

Population (2011)
  - Total: 223
  - Density: 117/km^{2} (300/sq mi)

Languages
  - Official: Telugu
- Time zone: UTC+5:30 (IST)
- Postal code: 533 446

Jaldam is a village in Rowthulapudi Mandal, Kakinada district in the state of Andhra Pradesh in India.

== Geography ==
Jaldam is located at 17.4325°N 82.3070°E.

== Demographics ==
As of 2011 India census, Jaldam had a population of 223, out of which 106 were male and 117 were female. The population of children below 6 years of age was 27. The literacy rate of the village was 40.82%.
