= Koduru, Kakinada District =

Koduru
- village
- Interactive map of Koduru
- Location in Andhra Pradesh, India Koduru (India)
- Coordinates: 17.3375°N 82.3967°E
- Country: India
- State: Andhra Pradesh
- District: Kakinada

Area
  - Total: 5.67 km^{2} (2.19 sq mi)

Population (2011)
  - Total: 479
  - Density: 84/km^{2} (220/sq mi)

Languages
  - Official: Telugu
- Time zone: UTC+5:30 (IST)
- Postal code: 533 446

Koduru is a village in Rowthulapudi Mandal, Kakinada district in the state of Andhra Pradesh in India.

== Geography ==
Koduru is located at 17.3375°N 82.3967°E.

== Demographics ==
As of 2011 India census, Koduru had a population of 479, out of which 234 were male and 245 were female. The population of children below 6 years of age was 43. The literacy rate of the village was 70.18%.
