= Bapabhupalapatnam =

- village
- Interactive map of Bapabhupalapatnam
- Location in Andhra Pradesh, India Bapabhupalapatnam (India)
- Coordinates: 17.3590°N 82.3796°E
- Country: India
- State: Andhra Pradesh
- District: Kakinada

Area
  - Total: 5.1 km^{2} (2.0 sq mi)

Population (2011)
  - Total: 830
  - Density: 163/km^{2} (420/sq mi)

Languages
  - Official: Telugu
- Time zone: UTC+5:30 (IST)
- Postal code: 533 446

Bapabhupalapatnam is a village in Rowthulapudi Mandal, Kakinada district in the state of Andhra Pradesh in India.

== Geography ==
Bapabhupalapatnam is located at 17.3590°N 82.3796°E.

== Demographics ==
As of 2011 India census, Bapabhupalapatnam had a population of 830, out of which 430 were male and 400 were female. The population of children below 6 years of age was 95. The literacy rate of the village was 55.92%.
