= Namagiri Narendrapatnam =

- village
- Interactive map of Namagiri Narendrapatnam
- Location in Andhra Pradesh, India Namagiri Narendrapatnam (India)
- Coordinates: 17.3912°N 82.4622°E
- Country: India
- State: Andhra Pradesh
- District: Kakinada

Area
  - Total: 11.09 km^{2} (4.28 sq mi)

Population (2011)
  - Total: 3,107
  - Density: 280/km^{2} (730/sq mi)

Languages
  - Official: Telugu
- Time zone: UTC+5:30 (IST)

Namagiri Narendrapatnam is a village in Rowthulapudi Mandal, Kakinada district in the state of Andhra Pradesh in India.

== Demographics ==
As of 2011 India census, Namagiri Narendrapatnam Village had a population of 3,107, out of which 1542 were male and 1565 were female. Population of children below 6 years of age were 315. The literacy rate of the village is 47.82%.
