= Parupaka =

- village
- Interactive map of Parupaka
- Location in Andhra Pradesh, India Parupaka (India)
- Coordinates: 17.3432°N 82.3968°E
- Country: India
- State: Andhra Pradesh
- District: Kakinada

Area
  - Total: 2.93 km^{2} (1.13 sq mi)

Population (2011)
  - Total: 2,336
  - Density: 797/km^{2} (2,060/sq mi)

Languages
  - Official: Telugu
- Time zone: UTC+5:30 (IST)
- Postal code: 533 446

Parupaka is a village in Rowthulapudi Mandal, Kakinada district in the state of Andhra Pradesh in India.

== Geography ==
Parupaka is located at 17.3432°N 82.3968°E.

== Demographics ==
As of 2011 India census, Parupaka had a population of 2,336, out of which 1175 were male and 1161 were female. Population of children below 6 years of age were 269. The literacy rate of the village is 43.59%.
