= Winnifred Paskall =

Winnifred May Paskall
- Born: Canada
- Other names: Paskall Aamma
- Occupations: Missionary, Canadian Baptist Ministries
- Years active: 1946-1979, 34 years in India
- Known for: Her work at the C.B.M. Jubilee Secondary and Training School for Women, Kakinada and the Eva Rose York Bible Training and Technical School for Women in Tuni

Winnifred May Paskall was a Missionary who came to India in 1946 through the Canadian Baptist Ministries.

Winnifred Paskall studied at the McMaster University from where she took a graduate degree in arts (B.A.) in 1935. Winnifred came to India in 1946 and served in women's development ministries and also became Principal of the Eva Rose York Bible Training and Technical School for Women in Tuni, Andhra Pradesh.

One of the support groups for Winnifred Paskall included the First Baptist Church, Leamington which used to raise money for work in India.

In 1978, the Canadian Baptist Ministries presented Paskall with a Service Pin in recognition of her 34 years' of missionary service in India.

Educational offices
Preceded by Ruth Fletcher; 1962-1967	Principal, Eva Rose York Bible Training and Technical School for Women, Tuni, Andhra Pradesh, India; 1968-1974	Succeeded by Jessie Rosser, 1974-1987
