= Dhara Jagannadhapuram =

- village
- Interactive map of Dhara Jagannadhapuram
- Location in Andhra Pradesh, India Dhara Jagannadhapuram (India)
- Coordinates: 17.3536°N 82.4429°E
- Country: India
- State: Andhra Pradesh
- District: Kakinada

Area
  - Total: 2.29 km^{2} (0.88 sq mi)

Population (2011)
  - Total: 740
  - Density: 323/km^{2} (840/sq mi)

Languages
  - Official: Telugu
- Time zone: UTC+5:30 (IST)
- Postal code: 533 446

Dhara Jagannadhapuram is a village in Rowthulapudi Mandal, Kakinada district in the state of Andhra Pradesh in India.

== Geography ==
Dhara Jagannadhapuram is located at 17.3536°N 82.4429°E.

== Demographics ==
As of 2011 India census, Dhara Jagannadhapuram had a population of 740, out of which 389 were male and 1359 were female. The population of children below 6 years of age was 115. The literacy rate of the village was 49.12%.
