= Pallapu Chamavaram =

- village
- Interactive map of Pallapu Chamavaram
- Location in Andhra Pradesh, India Pallapu Chamavaram (India)
- Coordinates: 17.2947°N 82.4815°E
- Country: India
- State: Andhra Pradesh
- District: Kakinada

Area
  - Total: 2.36 km^{2} (0.91 sq mi)

Population (2011)
  - Total: 1,510
  - Density: 640/km^{2} (1,700/sq mi)

Languages
  - Official: Telugu
- Time zone: UTC+5:30 (IST)
- Postal code: 533 446

Pallapu Chamavaram is a village in Rowthulapudi Mandal, Kakinada district in the state of Andhra Pradesh in India.

== Geography ==
Pallapu Chamavaram is located at 17.2947°N 82.4815°E.

== Demographics ==
As of 2011 India census, Pallapu Chamavaram had a population of 1,510, out of which 767 were male and 743 were female. Population of children below 6 years of age were 142. The literacy rate of the village is 57.75%.
