= Gangavaram, Kakinada district =

Gangavaram
- village
- Interactive map of Gangavaram
- Location in Andhra Pradesh, India Gangavaram (India)
- Coordinates: 17.4367°N 82.3572°E
- Country: India
- State: Andhra Pradesh
- District: Kakinada

Area
  - Total: 5 km^{2} (1.9 sq mi)

Population (2011)
  - Total: 1,253
  - Density: 251/km^{2} (650/sq mi)

Languages
  - Official: Telugu
- Time zone: UTC+5:30 (IST)
- Postal code: 533 446

Gangavaram is a village in Rowthulapudi Mandal, Kakinada district in the state of Andhra Pradesh in India.

== Geography ==
Gangavaram is located at 17.4367°N 82.3572°E.

== Demographics ==
As of 2011 India census, Gangavaram Village had a population of 1,253, out of which 624 were male and 629 were female. Population of children below 6 years of age were 139. The literacy rate of the village is 43.54%.
