= Tuni bus station =

Bus station in Tuni City, India

Annavaram bus station
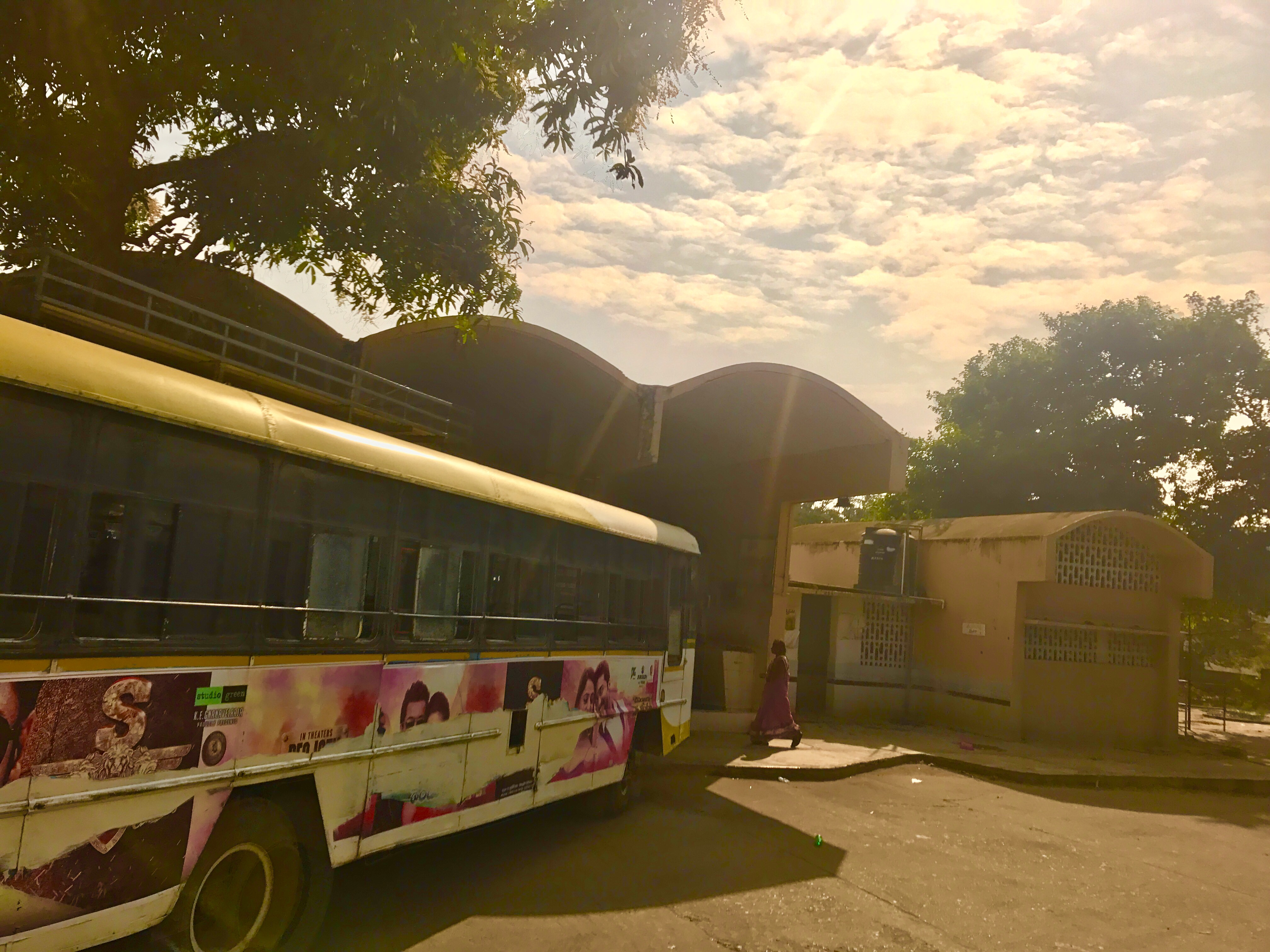
- Tuni bus station

General information
- Location: Tuni, Kakinada district, Andhra Pradesh; India
- Owner: APSRTC
- Operator: APSRTC
- Platforms: 10

Construction
- Parking: Yes

Other information
- Station code: Tuni

Tuni bus station is a bus station located in Tuni City of the Indian state of Andhra Pradesh. It is owned by Andhra Pradesh State Road Transport Corporation. This is one of the major bus stations in the state, with services to all the cities and Towns and villages in the district and also to nearby cities and to other states like Karnataka, Tamil Nadu and Telangana.
