= Dabbadi =

- village
- Interactive map of Dabbadi
- Location in Andhra Pradesh, India Dabbadi (India)
- Coordinates: 17.4756°N 82.3188°E
- Country: India
- State: Andhra Pradesh
- District: Kakinada

Area
  - Total: 0.94 km^{2} (0.36 sq mi)

Population (2011)
  - Total: 183
  - Density: 195/km^{2} (510/sq mi)

Languages
  - Official: Telugu
- Time zone: UTC+5:30 (IST)
- Postal code: 533 446

Dabbadi is a village in Rowthulapudi Mandal, Kakinada district in the state of Andhra Pradesh in India.

== Geography ==
Dabbadi is located at 17.4756°N 82.3188°E.

== Demographics ==
As of 2011 India census, Dabbadi had a population of 183, out of which 94 were male and 89 were female. Population of children below 6 years of age were 27. The literacy rate of the village is 23.08%.
