= Chamavaram =

- Village
- Interactive map of Chamavaram
- Location in Andhra Pradesh, India
- Coordinates: 17.294945°N 82.481325°E
- Country: India
- State: Andhra Pradesh
- District: Kakinada

Population (2011)
  - Total: 2,539

Languages
  - Official: Telugu
- Time zone: UTC+5:30 (IST)
- Postal code: 533401

Chamavaram is a village in Kakinada district of the Indian state of Andhra Pradesh. It is administered under Tuni mandal.

== Geography ==
Chamavaram is located at a distance of 12 km West of Tuni.

== Demographics ==
As of 2011 Census of India, the village had a population of 2,539. The total population constitute, 1,271 males, 1,268 females and 277 children, in the age group of 0–6 years. The average literacy rate stands at 54.82%, significantly lower than the national average of 73.00%.
