= Meraka Chamavaram =

- village
- Interactive map of Meraka Chamavaram
- Location in Andhra Pradesh, India Meraka Chamavaram (India)
- Coordinates: 17.2943°N 82.4824°E
- Country: India
- State: Andhra Pradesh
- District: Kakinada

Area
  - Total: 3.4 km^{2} (1.3 sq mi)

Population (2011)
  - Total: 1,675
  - Density: 494/km^{2} (1,280/sq mi)

Languages
  - Official: Telugu
- Time zone: UTC+5:30 (IST)
- Postal code: 533 446

Meraka Chamavaram is a village in Rowthulapudi Mandal, Kakinada district in the state of Andhra Pradesh in India.

== Geography ==
Meraka Chamavaram is located at 17.2943°N 82.4824°E.

== Demographics ==
As of 2011 India census, Meraka Chamavaram had a population of 1,675, out of which 826 were male and 849 were female. Population of children below 6 years of age were 196. The literacy rate of the village is 56.86%.
