= Satyavaram (Rowthulapudi Mandal) =

- village
- Interactive map of Satyavaram
- Location in Andhra Pradesh, India Satyavaram (India)
- Coordinates: 17.3250°N 82.5869°E
- Country: India
- State: Andhra Pradesh
- District: Kakinada

Area
  - Total: 0.75 km^{2} (0.29 sq mi)

Population (2011)
  - Total: 103
  - Density: 137/km^{2} (350/sq mi)

Languages
  - Official: Telugu
- Time zone: UTC+5:30 (IST)
- Postal code: 533 446

Satyavaram is a village in Rowthulapudi Mandal, Kakinada district in the state of Andhra Pradesh in India.

== Geography ==
Satyavaram is located at 17.3250°N 82.5869°E.

== Demographics ==
As of 2011 India census, Satyavaram had a population of 103, out of which 54 were male and 49 were female. Population of children below 6 years of age were 12. The literacy rate of the village is 27.47%.
