= Tirupatammapeta =

- village
- Interactive map of Tirupatammapeta
- Location in Andhra Pradesh, India Tirupatammapeta (India)
- Coordinates: 17.4034°N 82.3412°E
- Country: India
- State: Andhra Pradesh
- District: Kakinada

Area
  - Total: 1.61 km^{2} (0.62 sq mi)

Population (2011)
  - Total: 756
  - Density: 470/km^{2} (1,200/sq mi)

Languages
  - Official: Telugu
- Time zone: UTC+5:30 (IST)
- Postal code: 533 446

Tirupatammapeta is a village in Rowthulapudi Mandal, Kakinada district in the state of Andhra Pradesh in India.

== Geography ==
Tirupatammapeta is located at 17.4034°N 82.3412°E.

== Demographics ==
As of 2011 India census, Tirupatammapeta had a population of 756, out of which 367 were male and 389 were female. The population of children below 6 years of age was 94. The literacy rate of the village was 52.57%.
