= R.Venkatapuram (Rowthulapudi Mandal) =

- village
- Interactive map of R.Venkatapuram
- Location in Andhra Pradesh, India R.Venkatapuram (India)
- Coordinates: 17.4537°N 82.3722°E
- Country: India
- State: Andhra Pradesh
- District: Kakinada

Area
  - Total: 1.11 km^{2} (0.43 sq mi)

Population (2011)
  - Total: 301
  - Density: 271/km^{2} (700/sq mi)

Languages
  - Official: Telugu
- Time zone: UTC+5:30 (IST)
- Postal code: 533 446

R.Venkatapuram is a village in Rowthulapudi Mandal, Kakinada district in the state of Andhra Pradesh in India.

== Geography ==
R.Venkatapuram is located at 17.4537°N 82.3722°E.

== Demographics ==
As of 2011 India census, R.Venkatapuram had a population of 301, out of which 160 were male and 141 were female. The population of children below 6 years of age was 30. The literacy rate of the village was 49.82%.
