= Winnifred Eaton (missionary) =

- Born: Canada
- Other name: Eaton Amma
- Occupations: Missionary, Canadian Baptist Ministries
- Known for: Her work at the Eva Rose York Bible Training and Technical School for Women

Winnifred Eaton was a Canadian educator and missionary. She was the first principal of the Eva Rose York Bible Training and Technical School for Women in Tuni, Andhra Pradesh, India. Eaton used to participate in the joint conferences of the overseas missionaries comprising the Americans and the Canadians. She was a member of the Asiatic Society of Bengal.

The Eva Rose York Bible Training and Technical School for Women was first located in Palakonda, and was later moved to its present location in Tuni. Winnifred first served in Palakonda and was a pioneer in developing methods of education for the care of the women of India.

Educational offices
Preceded by Post created	Principal, Eva Rose York Bible Training and Technical School for Women, Tuni, Andhra Pradesh, India; 1922-1941	Succeeded by Mattie Curry, 1941-1961
