= Diguva Sivada =

- village
- Interactive map of Diguva Sivada
- Location in Andhra Pradesh, India Diguva Sivada (India)
- Coordinates: 17.4676°N 82.3678°E
- Country: India
- State: Andhra Pradesh
- District: Kakinada

Area
  - Total: 2.01 km^{2} (0.78 sq mi)

Population (2011)
  - Total: 677
  - Density: 337/km^{2} (870/sq mi)

Languages
  - Official: Telugu
- Time zone: UTC+5:30 (IST)
- Postal code: 533 446

Diguva Sivada is a village in Rowthulapudi Mandal, Kakinada district in the state of Andhra Pradesh in India.

== Geography ==
Diguva Sivada is located at 17.4676°N 82.3678°E.

== Demographics ==
As of 2011 India census, Diguva Sivada had a population of 677, out of which 359 were male and 318 were female. The population of children below 6 years of age was 65. The literacy rate of the village was 45.42%.
