= Challeru =

- village
- Interactive map of Challeru
- Location in Andhra Pradesh, India Challeru (India)
- Coordinates: 17.4403°N 82.3216°E
- Country: India
- State: Andhra Pradesh
- District: Kakinada

Area
  - Total: 0.4 km^{2} (0.15 sq mi)

Population (2011)
  - Total: 52
  - Density: 130/km^{2} (340/sq mi)

Languages
  - Official: Telugu
- Time zone: UTC+5:30 (IST)
- Postal code: 533 446

Challeru is a village in Rowthulapudi Mandal, Kakinada district in the state of Andhra Pradesh in India.

== Geography ==
Challeru is located at 17.4403°N 82.3216°E.

== Demographics ==
As of 2011 India census, Challeru had a population of 52, out of which 29 were male and 23 were female. Population of children below 6 years of age were 7. The literacy rate of the village is 20.00%.
