= Chepuru =

- Village
- Interactive map of Chepuru
- Location in Andhra Pradesh, India
- Coordinates: 17.291079°N 82.471023°E
- Country: India
- State: Andhra Pradesh
- District: Kakinada

Population (2011)
  - Total: 1,893

Languages
  - Official: Telugu
- Time zone: UTC+5:30 (IST)
- Postal code: 533401

Chepuru is a village in Kakinada district of the Indian state of Andhra Pradesh. It is administered under Tuni mandal.

== Geography ==
Chepuru is located at a distance of 13 km South-West of its Mandal Headquarters Tuni.

== Demographics ==
As of 2011 Census of India, the village had a population of 1,893. The total population constitute, 964 males, 929 females and 244 children, in the age group of 0–6 years. The average literacy rate stands at 61.73%, significantly lower than the national average of 73.00%.
