= Srungadhara Agraharam =

- village
- Interactive map of Srungadhara Agraharam
- Location in Andhra Pradesh, India Srungadhara Agraharam (India)
- Coordinates: 17.3592°N 82.4216°E
- Country: India
- State: Andhra Pradesh
- District: Kakinada

Area
  - Total: 2.18 km^{2} (0.84 sq mi)

Population (2011)
  - Total: 2,618
  - Rank: 1201

Languages
  - Official: Telugu
- Time zone: UTC+5:30 (IST)
- Postal code: 533 446

Srungadhara Agraharam is a village in Rowthulapudi Mandal, Kakinada district in the state of Andhra Pradesh in India.

== Geography ==
Srungadhara Agraharam is located at 17.3592°N 82.4216°E.

== Demographics ==
Srungadhara Agraharam Village has a population of 2,618, out of which 1358 are male and 1260 are female. Population of children below 6 years of age are 376. The literacy rate of the village is 47.90%.
