= Mulagapudi =

- village
- Interactive map of Mulagapudi
- Location in Andhra Pradesh, India Mulagapudi (India)
- Coordinates: 17.2335°N 82.2154°E
- Country: India
- State: Andhra Pradesh
- District: Kakinada

Area
  - Total: 15.55 km^{2} (6.00 sq mi)

Population (2011)
  - Total: 4,600
  - Density: 296/km^{2} (770/sq mi)

Languages
  - Official: Telugu
- Time zone: UTC+5:30 (IST)

Mulagapudi is a village in Rowthulapudi Mandal, Kakinada district in the state of Andhra Pradesh in India.

== Geography ==
Mualagapudi is located at 17.2335°N 82.2154°E, in the East Godavari District, Andhra Pradesh, India.

== Demographics ==
Mulagapudi Village has a population of 4600, out of which 2371 are male and 2229 are female. Population of children below 6 years of age are 456. The literacy rate of the village is 51.64%.
