= Latchireddipalem =

- village
- Interactive map of Latchireddipalem
- Location in Andhra Pradesh, India Latchireddipalem (India)
- Coordinates: 17.3852°N 82.4272°E
- Country: India
- State: Andhra Pradesh
- District: Kakinada
- Mandal: Rowthulapudi

Area
  - Total: 7.4 km^{2} (2.9 sq mi)

Population (2011)
  - Total: 3,078
  - Density: 414/km^{2} (1,070/sq mi)

Languages
  - Official: Telugu
- Time zone: UTC+5:30 (IST)
- Postal code: 533 446

Latchireddipalem is a village in Rowthulapudi mandal, Kakinada district in the state of Andhra Pradesh in India.

== Geography ==
Latchireddipalem is located at 17.4215°N 81.9801°E.

== Demographics ==
Latchireddipalem village has a population of 3,078, out of which 1549 are male and 1529 are female. Population of children below 6 years of age are 424. The literacy rate of the village is 52.07%.
