= Chakirevulapalem =

- village
- Interactive map of Chakirevulapalem
- Location in Andhra Pradesh, India Chakirevulapalem (India)
- Coordinates: 17.4128°N 82.3209°E
- Country: India
- State: Andhra Pradesh
- District: Kakinada

Area
  - Total: 1.15 km^{2} (0.44 sq mi)

Population (2011)
  - Total: 155
  - Density: 135/km^{2} (350/sq mi)

Languages
  - Official: Telugu
- Time zone: UTC+5:30 (IST)
- Postal code: 533 446

Chakirevulapalem is a village in Rowthulapudi Mandal, Kakinada district in the state of Andhra Pradesh in India.

== Geography ==
Chakirevulapalem is located at 17.4128°N 82.3209°E.

== Demographics ==
As of 2011 India census, Chakirevulapalem had a population of 155, out of which 64 were male and 91 were female. Population of children below 6 years of age were 16. The literacy rate of the village is 45.32%.
