= Avasarala Ramakrishna Rao =

Indian writer

- Born: 21 December 1931; Tuni, East Godavari, Madras Presidency, British India
- Died: 28 October 2011 (aged 79); Hyderabad, Andhra Pradesh

Avasarala Ramakrishna Rao was a Telugu short story writer. His works include Sampengalu-Sannajajulu i.e., Michelia Champaca and Jasmine flowers), Ketu-Dupliketu (i.e., The mischievous and his duplicate), Pekamukkalu (i.e., The playing cards) and Astipanjaram i.e., The skeleton), Rasavadgita, a pun on Bhagavad Gita), Kadilinche katha (i.e., A moving story).

== Early life ==
Ramakrishna was born in Tuni in East Godavari district. He worked as a Mathematics and Science teacher there before he did M.A. in English. He had a Ph.D. on George Orwell from Andhra University.

== Literary career ==
Ramakrishna began his literary career at the age of 17. He authored more than 600 short stories, 15 novels and 4 children's novels. He was known for his wit and humor.

Apart from his short stories, he wrote a number of one-act plays, songs and poems for All India Radio and literary magazines, essays on mathematics and science. Avasarala's feature 'Mathe-me-tricks' (మేథ-में-Tricks i.e., tricks to solve Mathematical problems easily) was carried regularly in the children's magazine, Bala Jyothi (Telugu: బాలజ్యోతి i.e., Light for kids), with a silver jubilee run. This feature posed interesting logical, analytical or mathematical problems every month and the readers would send their answers to win the prize.

At the time of his death, he was writing a column called 'Angrezi-Made-Easy' (i.e., English made easy) for a leading Telugu daily. He contributed regularly to book reviews and a feature called Sebhashitaalu (Telugu: శభాషితాలు, a pun on Subhashitalu) in the Telugu edition of India Today.

According to him, his most satisfying work is Pekamukkalu, a compilation of the short stories published in various magazines over the past 52 years.

== Personality ==
He described himself in the following four lines.

In teaching? Non-stop fun!
In writing? Evergreen pun!
Even at seventy-one
I enjoy being two-in-one!

Although he taught English, his writings were in Telugu. His writings reflected his critical views of society and he chose harsh words to describe it according to himself. He was an atheist and wanted people to move from 'foolish faith to pragmatism'. His favorite writers were Ranganayakamma and Volga, both Telugu female writers.

== Awards ==
He won the Andhra Pradesh Sahitya Academy award for his anthology of short stories Ardhamunna Kadhalu (Telugu: అర్థమున్న కథలు i.e., Stories with a meaning) in 1969. He was the recipient of "Best Writer in Humour" award of Sri Potti Sriramulutu Telugu University in 1994 and Delhi Telugu Academy's Ugadi Puraskar in 2000. He was felicitated by the Andhra Sanskriti Sangham, Chandigarh in 2000.

== Death ==
He underwent a bypass surgery at NIMS, after which he developed complications leading to death. As he wished, his body was donated to the Osmania Medical College for research. He is survived by wife and son.
