= Ruth Fletcher =

- Born: Canada
- Other name: Ruth-Amma
- Occupations: Missionary, Canadian Baptist Ministries
- Years active: 1954-1968 in India
- Known for: Her work at the Eva Rose York Bible Training and Technical School for Women in Tuni

Ruth Fletcher was the third Principal of the Eva Rose York Bible Training and Technical School for Women in Tuni. Ruth was the great granddaughter of A. V. Timpany, one of the pioneer missionaries of the Canadian Baptist Ministries. Ruth's cousin, Dorothy Timpany was a Medical Doctor at the Bethel Hospital, Vuyyuru.

Ruth studied at the Toronto Bible School between 1952-1953 and later pursued graduate studies at the McMaster University which awarded her a B.A.

Some of the correspondence of Ruth Fletcher is kept at Wheaton College, Illinois.

Educational offices
Preceded by Mattie E. Curry; 1941-1961	Principal, Eva Rose York Bible Training and Technical School for Women, Tuni, Andhra Pradesh, India; 1962-1967	Succeeded by Winnifred Paskall, 1968-1974
