= Balarampur, Rupandehi =

Balarampur बलरामपुर
- Village Development Committee
- Country: Nepal
- Province: Lumbini Province
- District: Rupandehi District

Population (1991)
  - Total: 4,533
- Time zone: UTC+5:45 (Nepal Time)

Balarampur is a Village Development Committee in Rupandehi District in Lumbini Province of southern Nepal. At the time of the 1991 Nepal census it had a population of 4533 people residing in 686 individual households.
