= Balarampuram (Rowthulapudi Mandal) =

- village
- Interactive map of Balarampuram
- Location in Andhra Pradesh, India Balarampuram (India)
- Coordinates: 17.3943°N 82.3803°E
- Country: India
- State: Andhra Pradesh
- District: Kakinada

Area
  - Total: 2.15 km^{2} (0.83 sq mi)

Population (2011)
  - Total: 2,050
  - Density: 953/km^{2} (2,470/sq mi)

Languages
  - Official: Telugu
- Time zone: UTC+5:30 (IST)
- Postal code: 533 446

Balarampuram is a village in Rowthulapudi Mandal, Kakinada district in the state of Andhra Pradesh in India.

== Geography ==
Balarampuram is located at 17.3943°N 82.3803°E.

== Demographics ==
As of 2011 India census, Balarampuram had a population of 2,050, out of which 1065 were male and 985 were female. Population of children below 6 years of age were 204. The literacy rate of the village is 54.77%.
