= Rowthulapudi mandal =

- Mandal
- Interactive Map Outlining mandal
- Country: India
- State: Andhra Pradesh
- District: Kakinada
- Time zone: UTC+5:30 (IST)
- Vehicle Registration: AP05 (Former); AP39 (from 30 January 2019)

Rowthulapudi Mandal is one of the 21 mandals in Kakinada District of Andhra Pradesh. As per census 2011, there are 38 villages.

== Demographics ==
Rowthulapudi mandal has total population of 55,236 as per the Census 2011 out of which 28,050 are males while 27,186 are females. The average Sex Ratio of Rowthulapudi Mandal is 969. The total literacy rate of Rowthulapudi Mandal is 51.11%. The male literacy rate is 50.2% and the female literacy rate is 40.4%.

== Towns and villages ==
=== Villages ===
1. A. Mallavaram
2. Balarampuram
3. Bapabhupalapatnam
4. Billavaka
5. Chakirevulapalem
6. Challeru
7. D.Pydipala
8. Dabbadi
9. Dhara Jagannadhapuram
10. Diguva Sivada
11. Diguvadarapalle
12. Gangavaram
13. Gidajam
14. Ginnelaram
15. Gummaregula
16. Jaldam
17. Koduru
18. Kothuru
19. Latchireddipalem
20. Meraka Chamavaram
21. Mulagapudi
22. Namagiri Narendrapatnam
23. Pallapu Chamavaram
24. Parupaka
25. Pedduru
26. R.Venkatapuram
27. Raghavapatnam
28. Rajavaram
29. Ramakrishnapuram
30. Rowthulapudi
31. Santha Pydipala
32. Sarlanka
33. Satyavaram
34. Srungadhara Agraharam
35. Srungavaram
36. Tirupatammapeta
37. Uppampalem
38. Venakatanagaram

== See also ==
- List of mandals in Andhra Pradesh
