= Balarampur, Kapilvastu =

Balarampur बलरामपुर
- Village development committee
- Interactive map of Balarampur
- Country: Nepal
- Zone: Lumbini Zone
- District: Kapilvastu District

Population (1991)
  - Total: 4,590
- Time zone: UTC+5:45 (Nepal Time)

Balarampur is a village development committee in Kapilvastu District in the Lumbini Zone of southern Nepal. Maharajgunj is the biggest and the nearest market area in the VDC.
