= Routhulapudi =

Rowthulapudi
- Village
- Interactive map of Rowthulapudi
- Location in Andhra Pradesh, India
- Coordinates: 17°22′31″N 82°22′05″E
- Country: India
- State: Andhra Pradesh
- District: Kakinada
- Mandal: Rowthulapudi

Area
  - Total: 250 km^{2} (97 sq mi)

Languages
  - Official: Telugu
- Time zone: UTC+5:30 (IST)

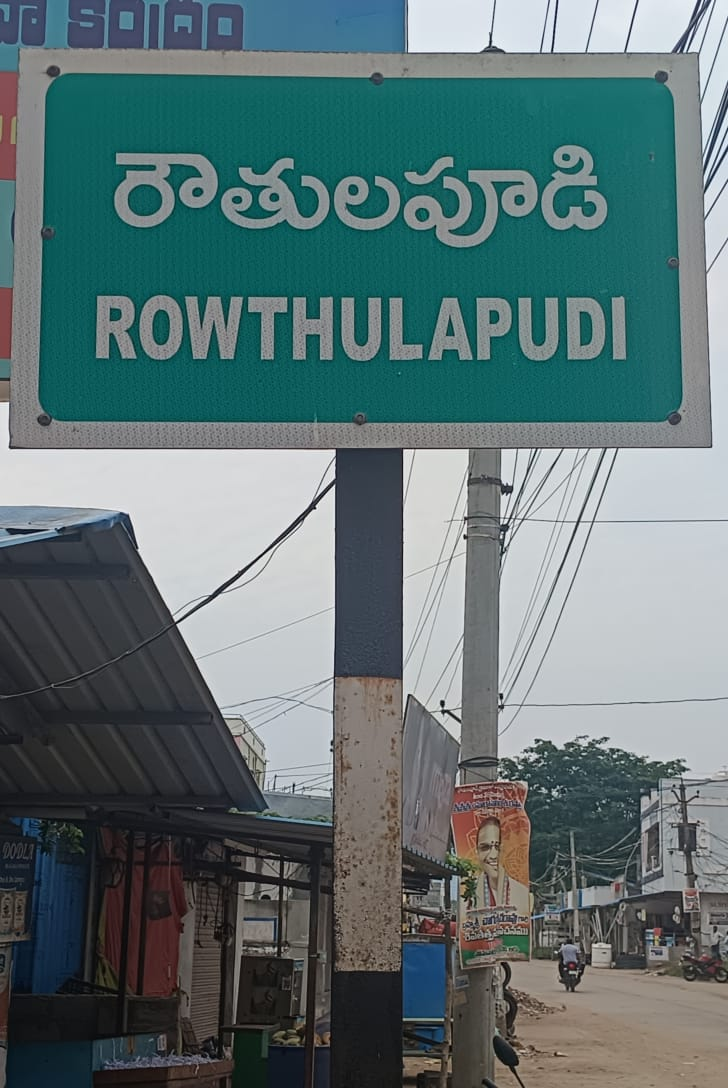
Name board of Routhulapudi

Rowthulapudi is a village in Kakinada district of the Indian state of Andhra Pradesh. It is located in Rowthulapudi Mandal.

== Geography ==
Rowthulapudi is located in the east part of India. It has an average elevation of 150 metres (1067 ft).

== Demographics ==
Rowthulapudi's total population is 91,400; 61.6% male and 38.4% female. About 13.48% of the population is under age six.

== Government Buildings in Rowthulapudi ==
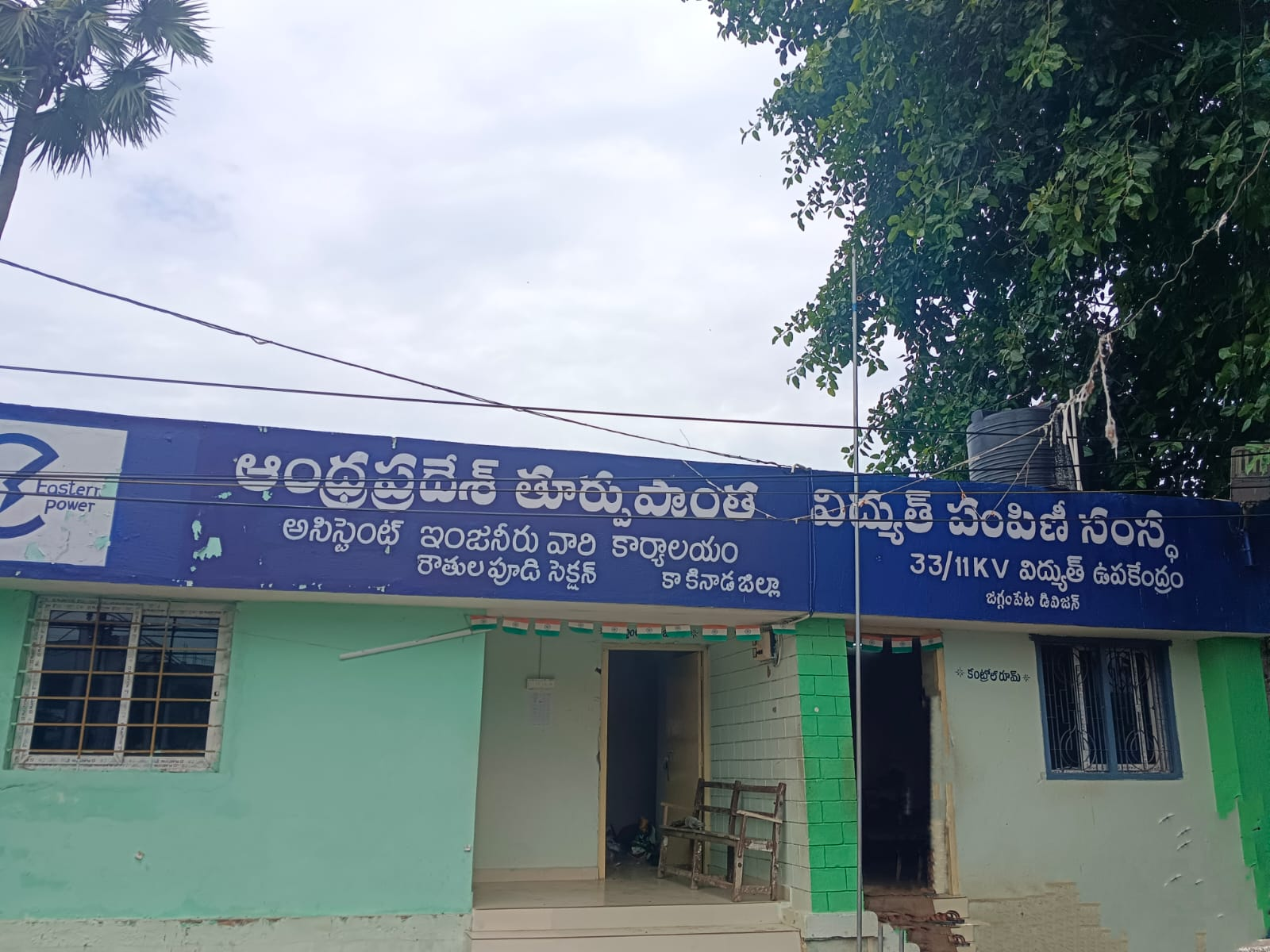
Current Office

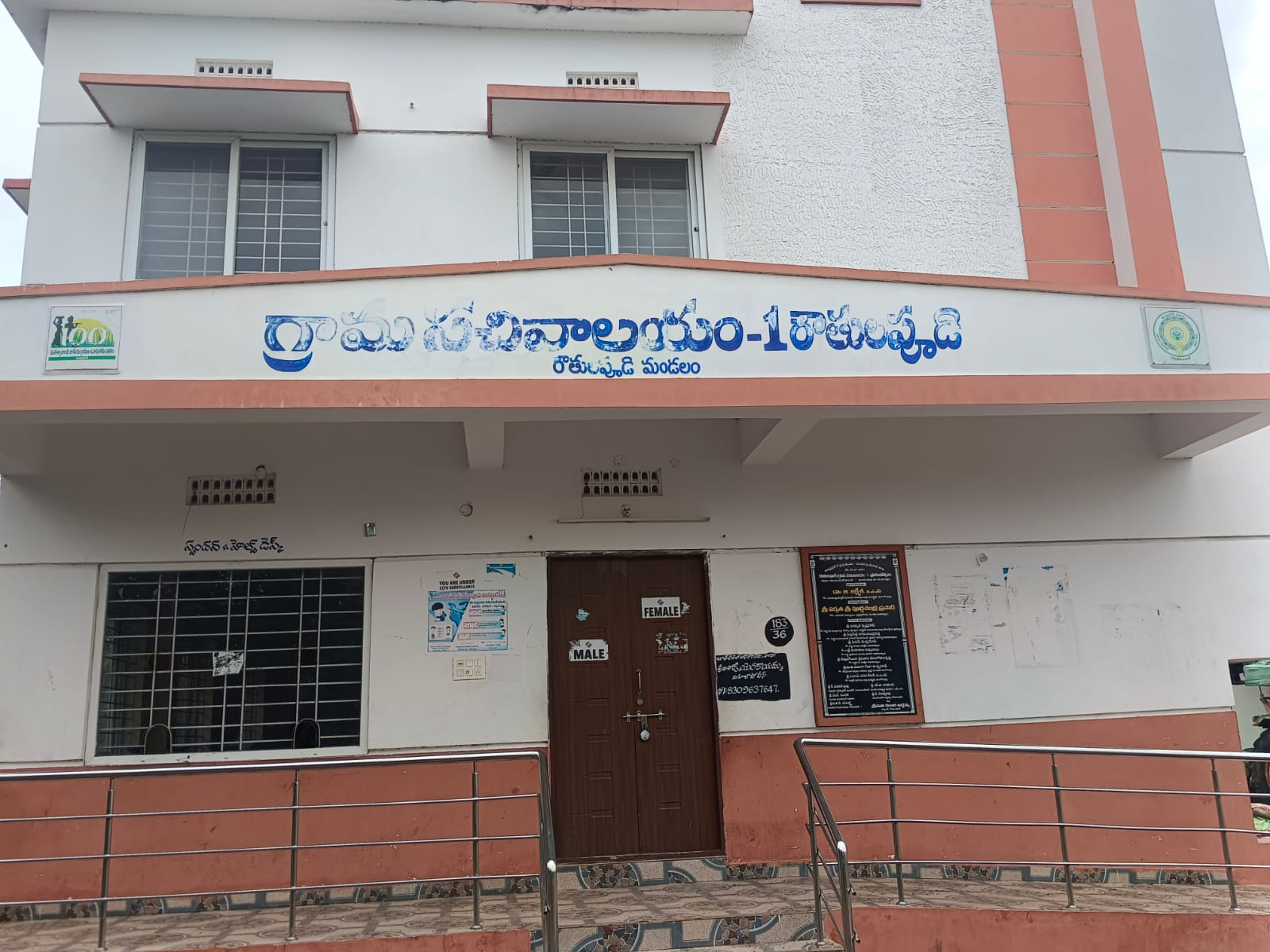
Grama Sachivalayam1

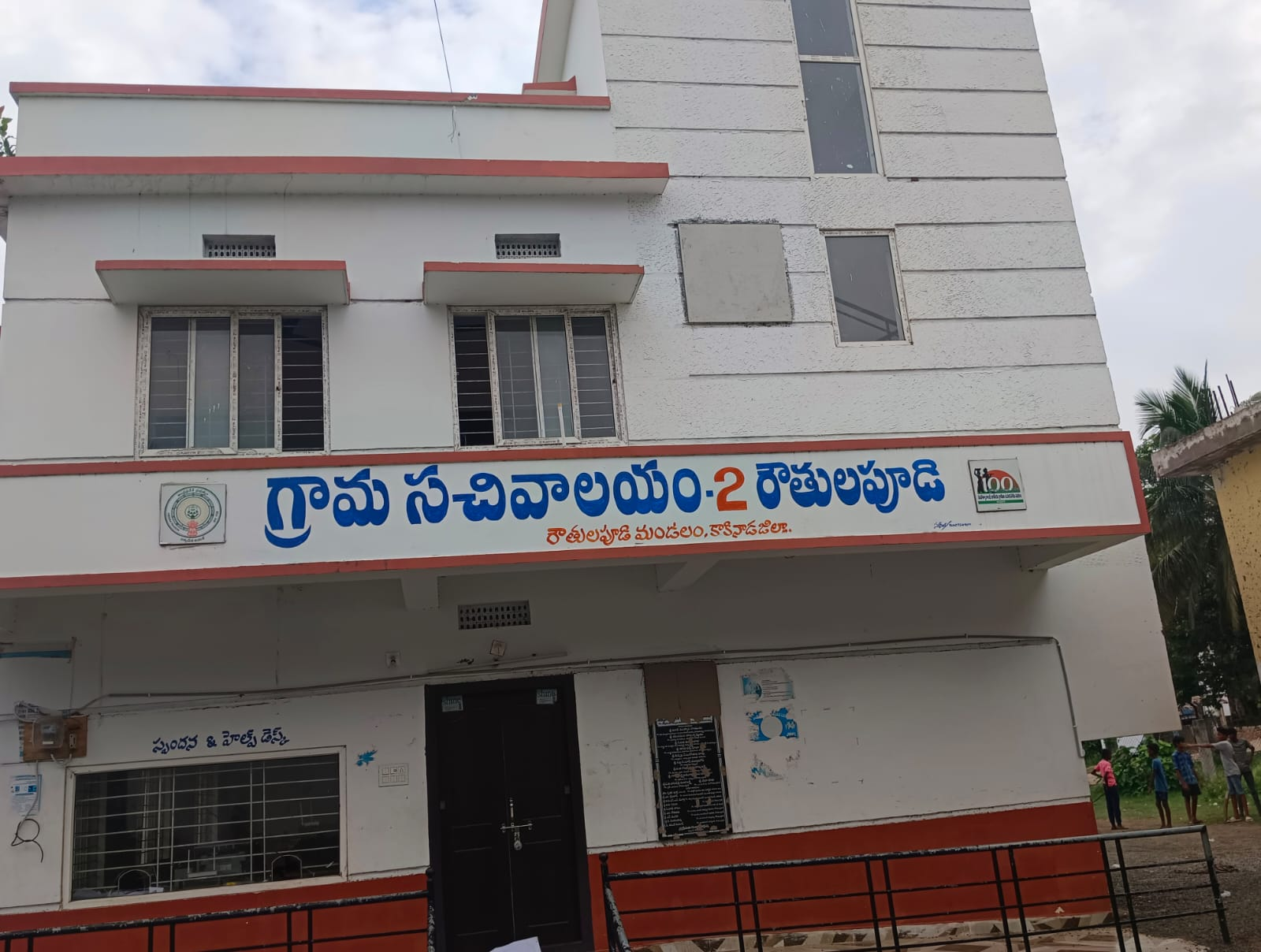
Grama Sachivalyam2

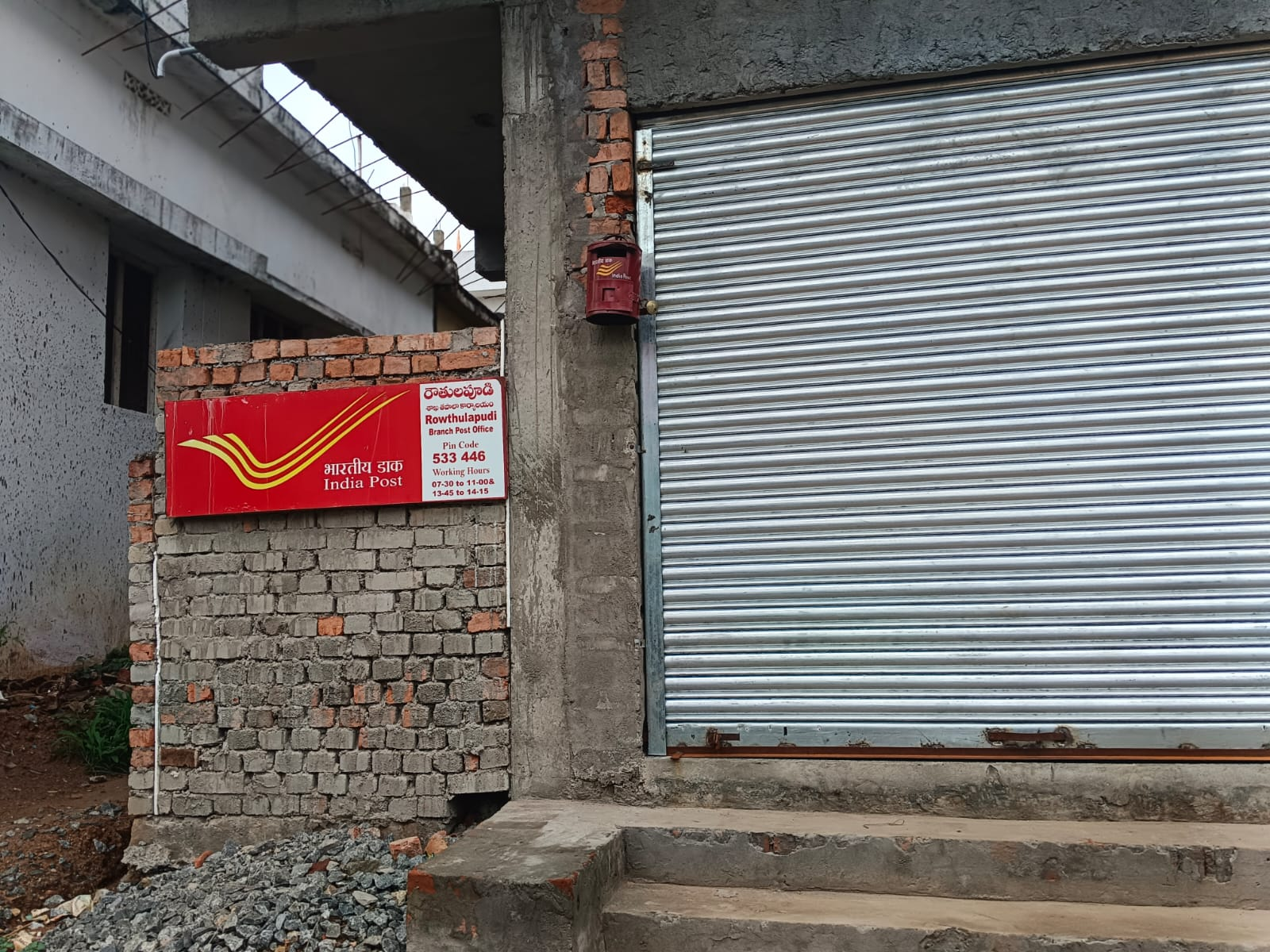
Post Office

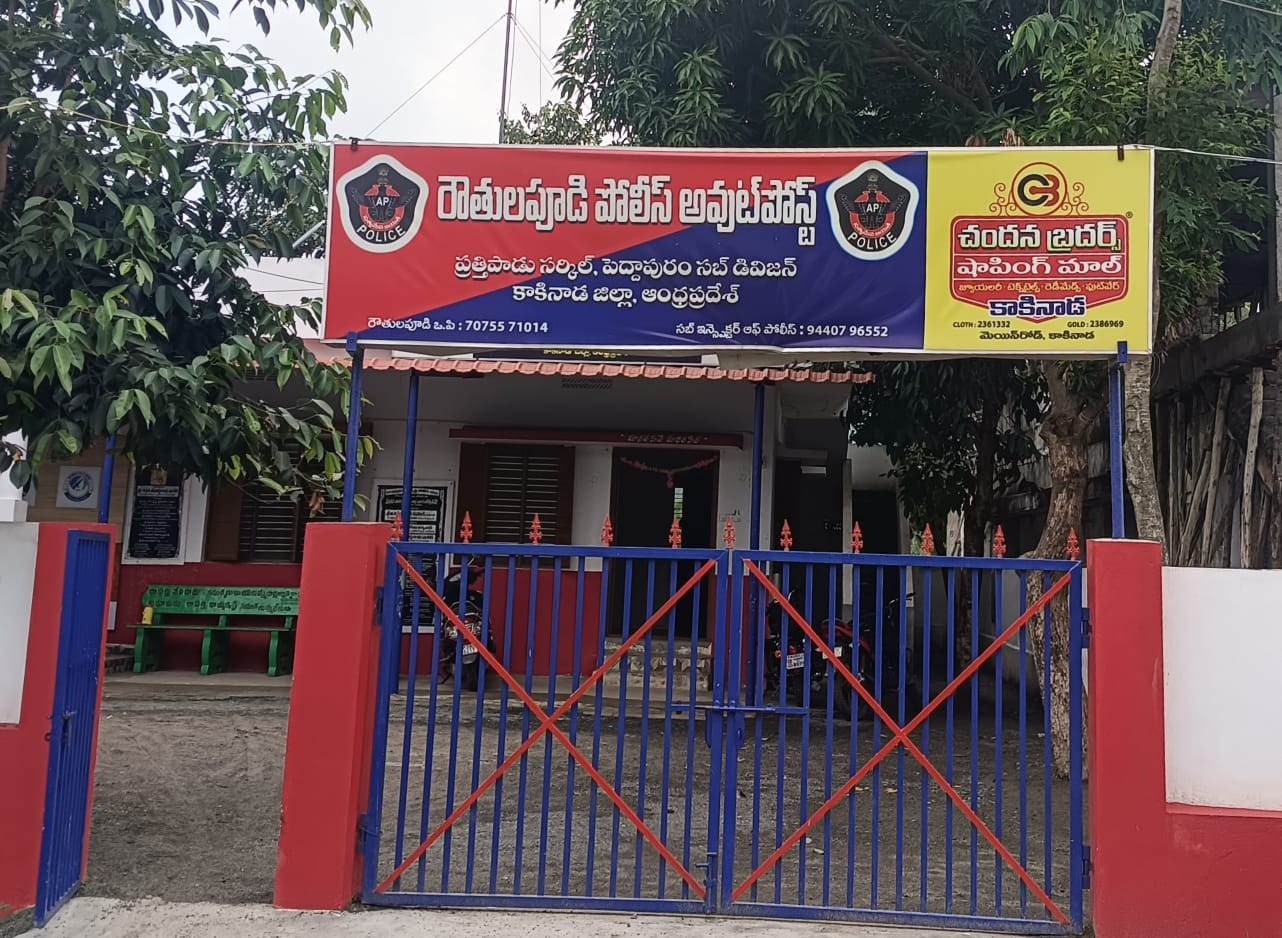
Police Station

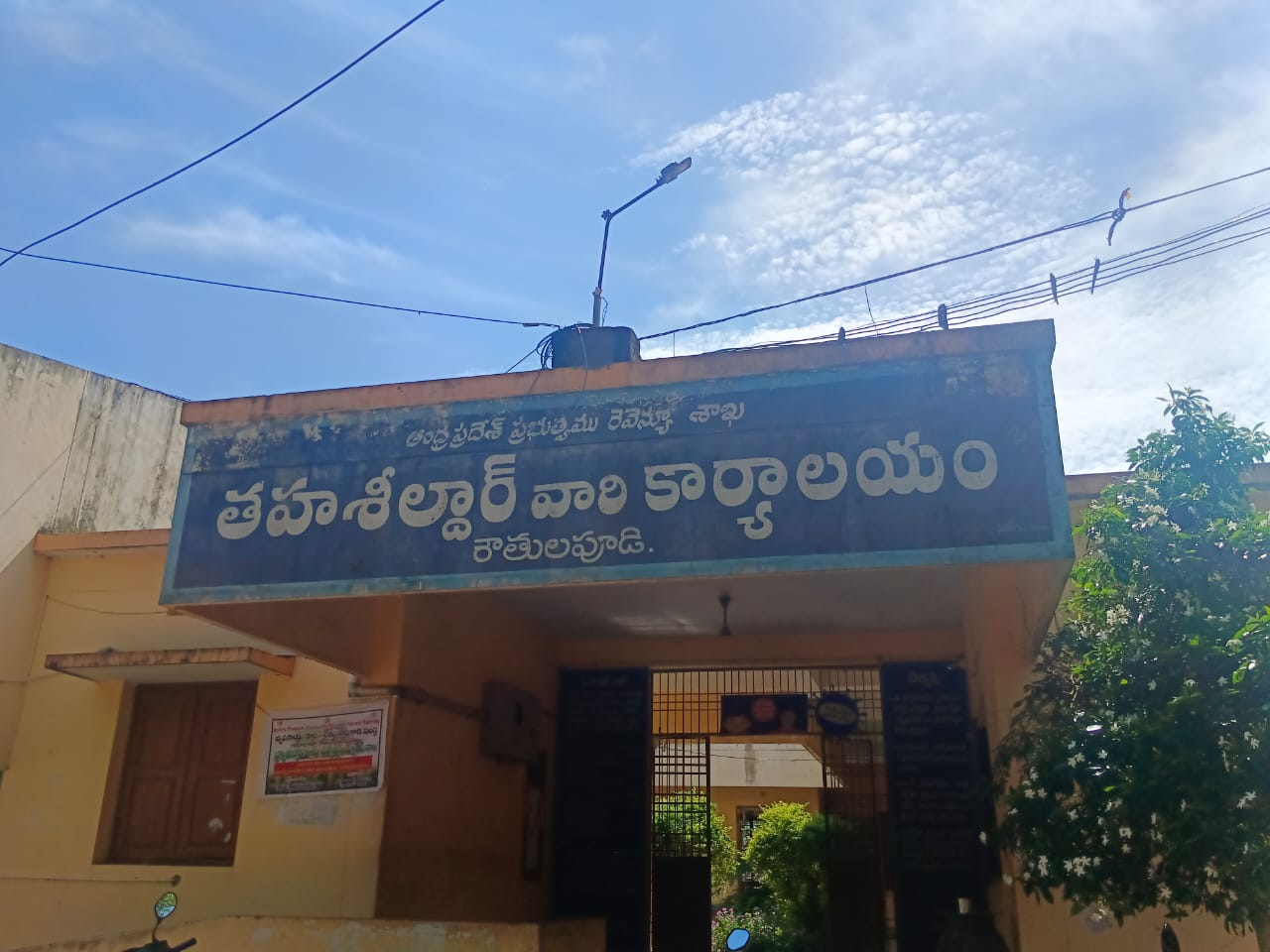
Thasildar Office

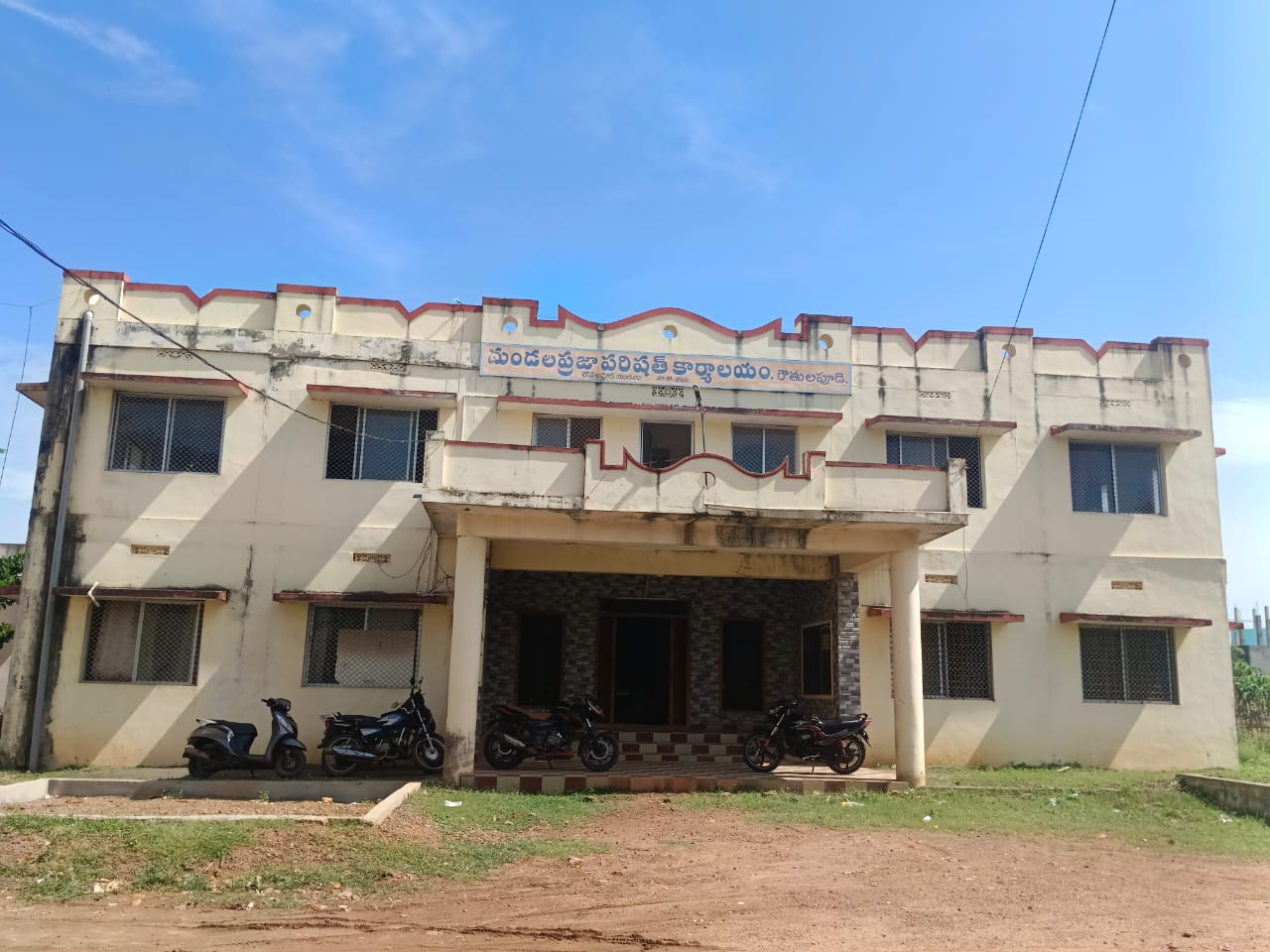
Mandal Praja Parishath Office

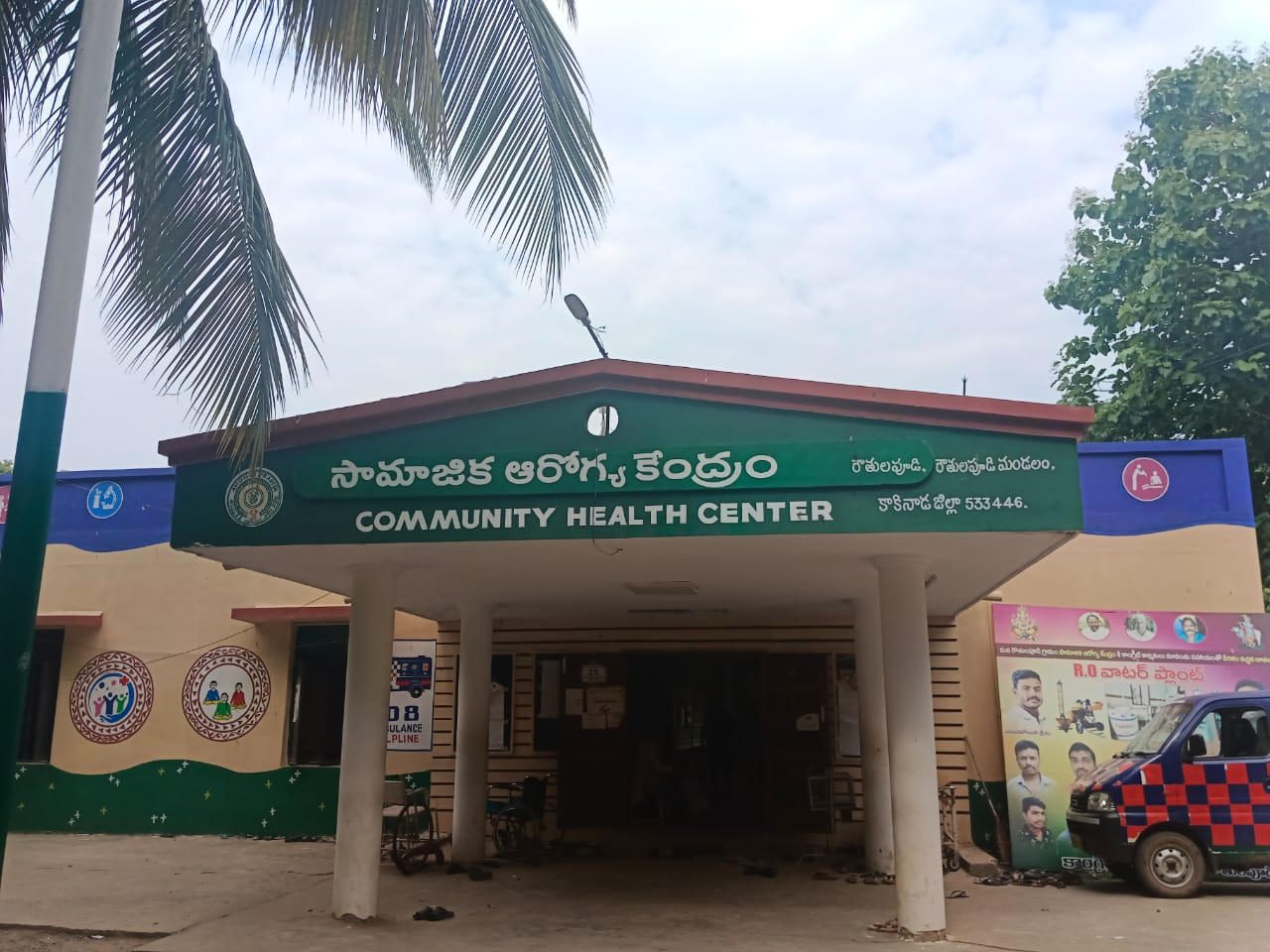
Government Hospital

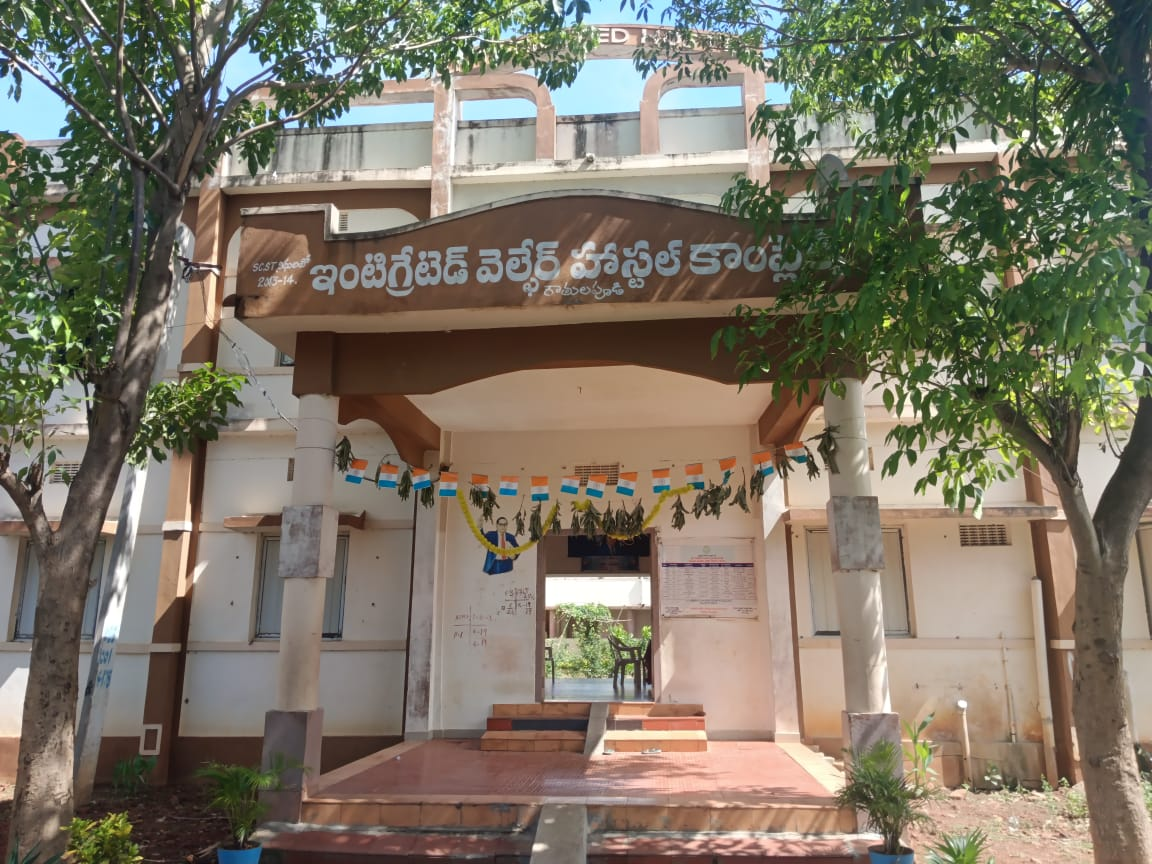
Integrated Welfare Hostel

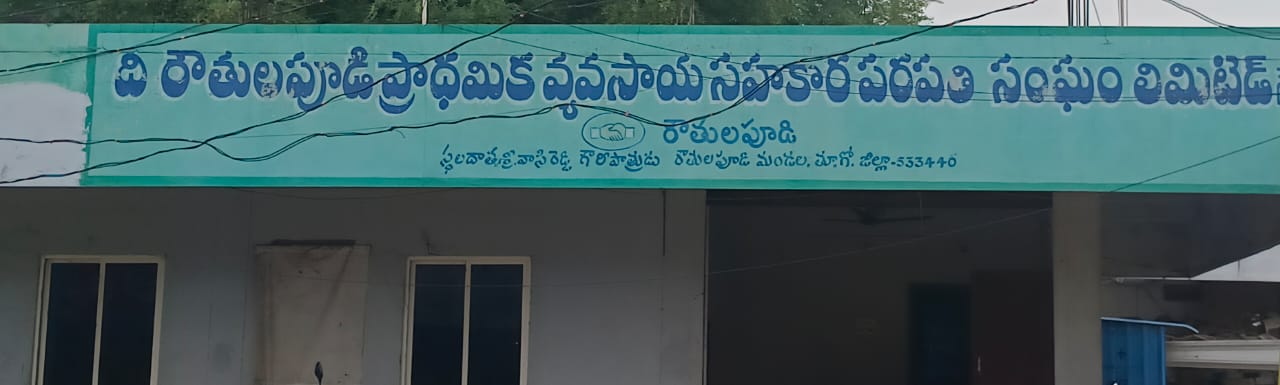
Raithu Barosa Kendram

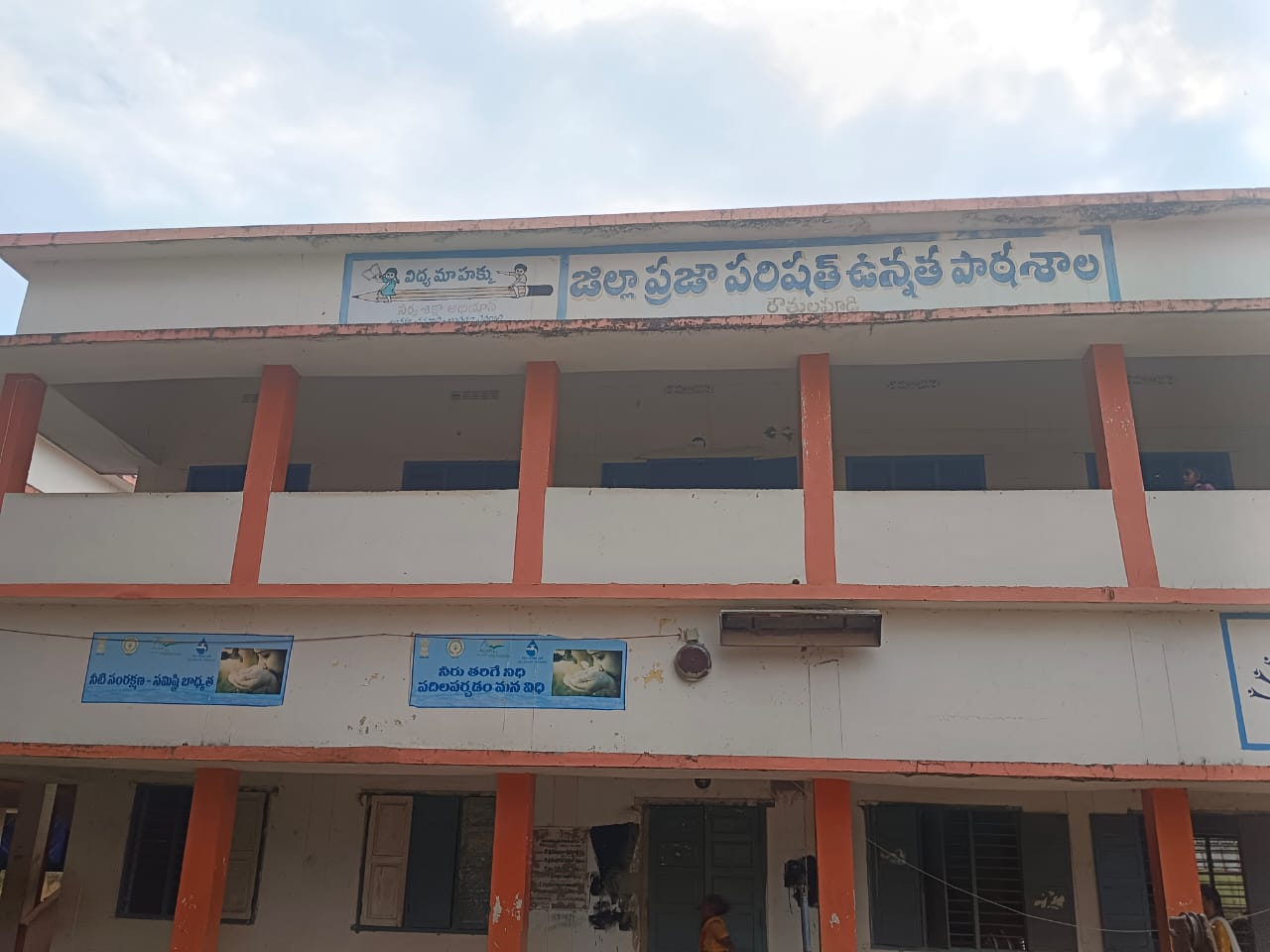
ZP High School

== Temples in Rowthulapudi ==
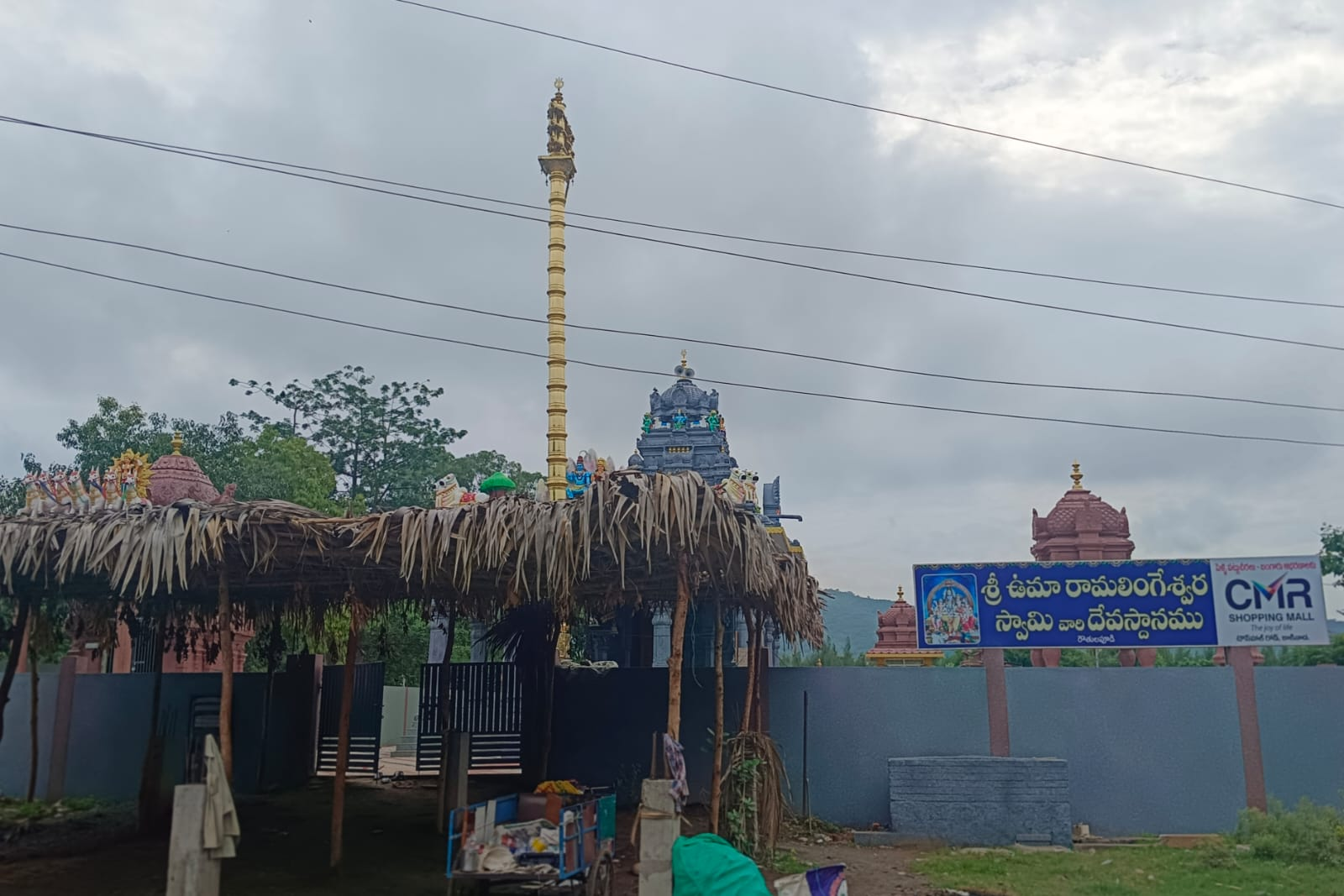
Shree Uma Ramalingeswara Swamy Temple

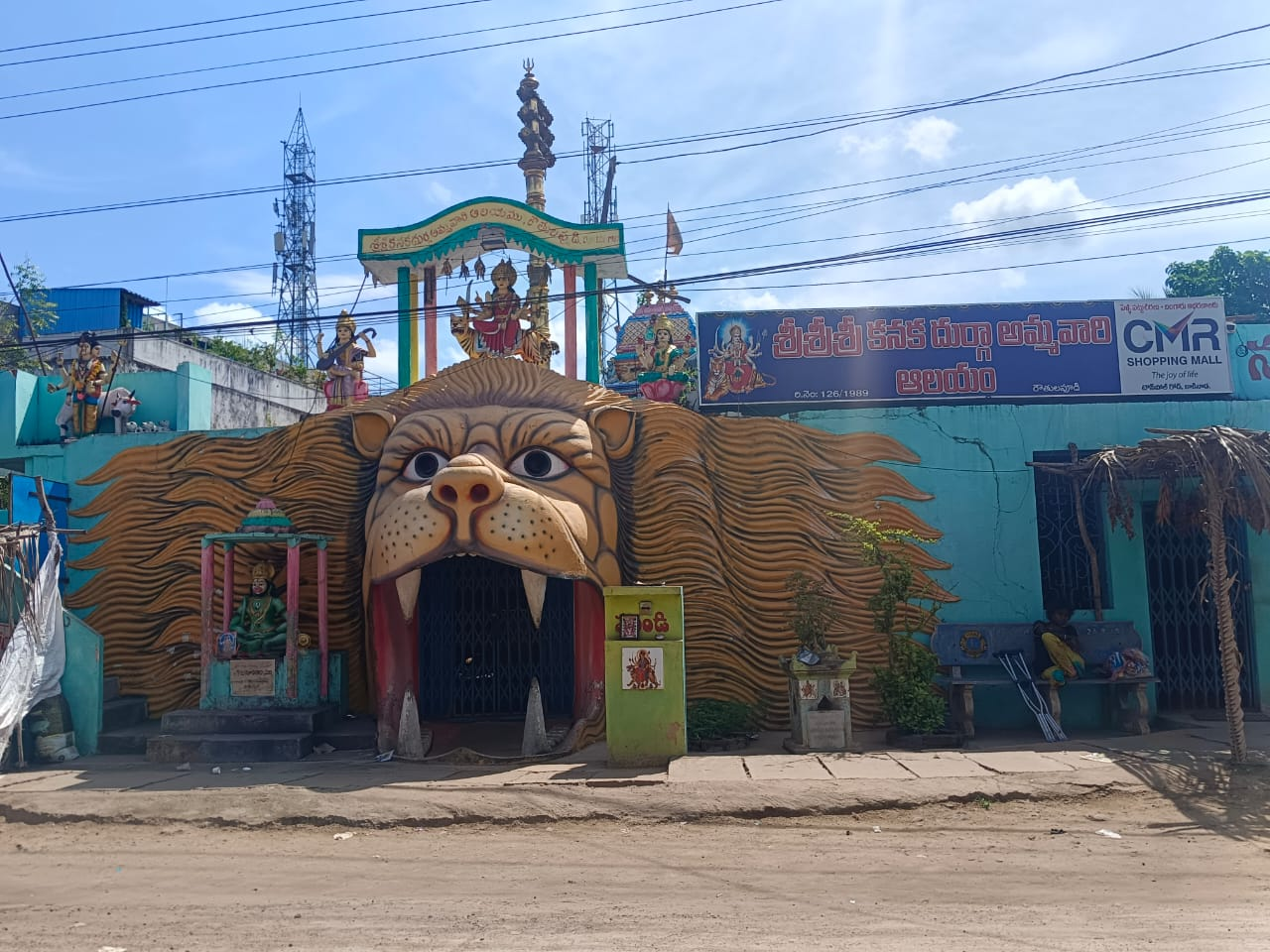
Kanaka Durga Bhavani Temple

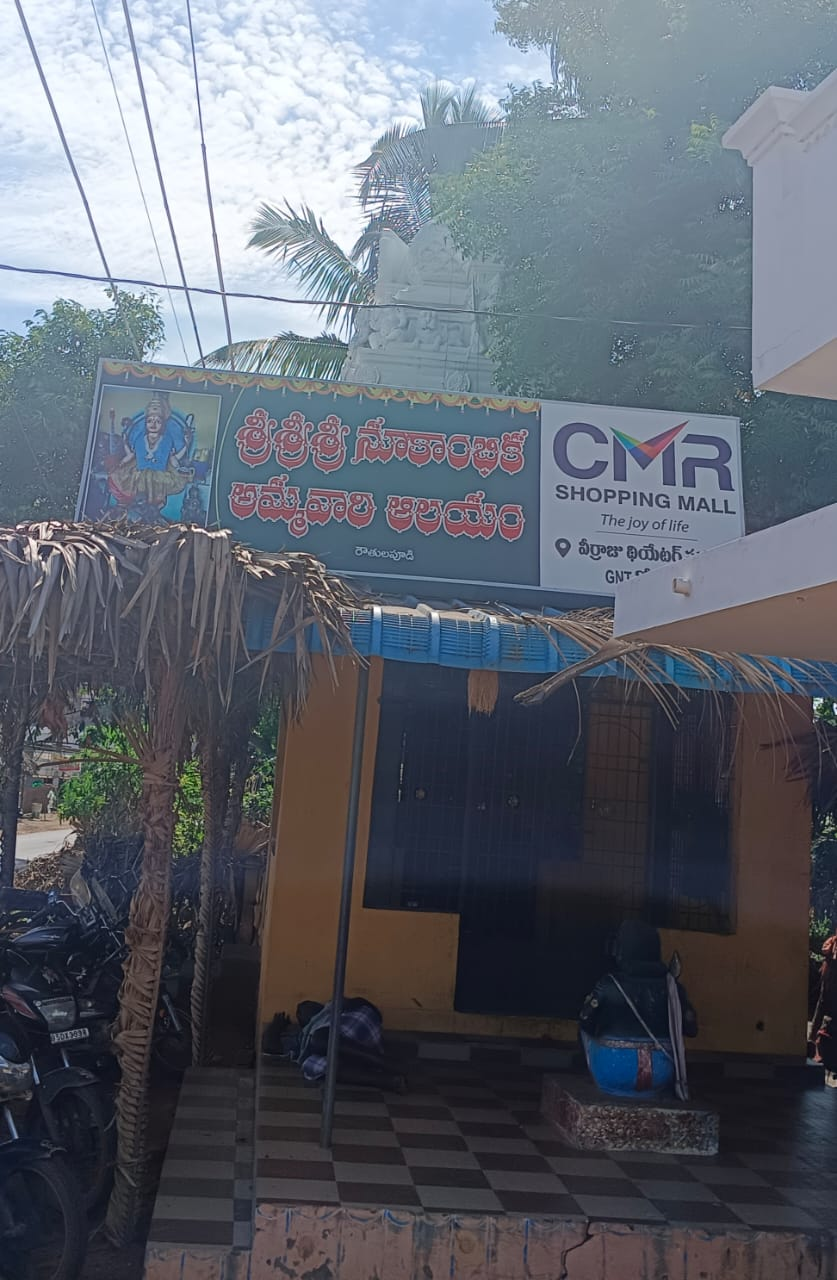
Devi Nookambika Temple

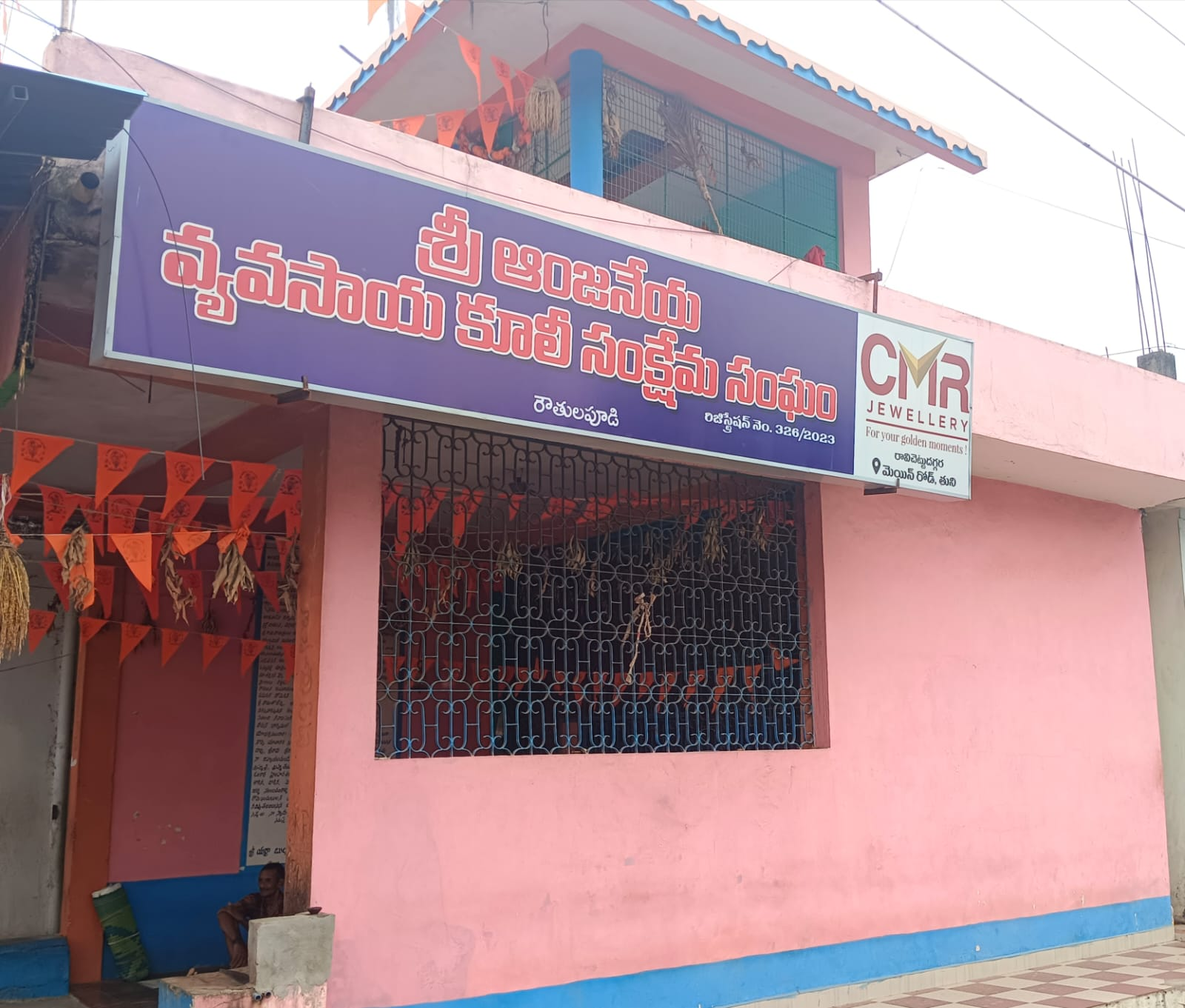
Hanuman Temple
