= Balrampur, Ambedkar Nagar =

Balrampur
- Town
- Location in Uttar Pradesh, India Balrampur (India)
- Coordinates: 26°18′17″N 83°03′47″E
- Country: India
- State: Uttar Pradesh
- Founder: Shree Balram Pandit
- Named for: Balram Pandit

Government
  - Type: Nagar Panchayat
- Elevation: 1,349 m (4,426 ft)

Population (2011)
  - Total: 19,996
  - Rank: 2

Languages
  - Official: Hindi, Awadhi, English
- Time zone: UTC+5:30 (IST)
- PIN: 224176
- Vehicle registration: UP 45
- Sex ratio: 1000/980 ♂/♀

Balrampur is a town in Ambedkar Nagar district in the Indian state of Uttar Pradesh and is Subpost Office of Rajesultanpur.

== Demographics ==
As of 2011 India census, Balrampur had a population of 19,997. Males constitute 51% of the population and females 49%. Balrampur has an average literacy rate of 62%, higher than the national average of 59.5%: male literacy is 71%, and female literacy is 52%. In balrampur, 17% of the population is under 6 years of age.

Religions in Balrampur
Religion	Percent
Hindus	80%
Muslims	15%
Jains	3%
Others†	2%
Distribution of religions †Includes Sikhs (0%), Buddhists (<0%).

== Nearby Cities ==
- Rajesultanpur 0.9 km
- Tanda 53 km
- Azamgarh 27 km
- Gorakhpur 62 km
- Faizabad 124 km
