= Thondangi =

- village
- Interactive map of Thondangi
- Location in Andhra Pradesh, India Thondangi (India)
- Coordinates: 17.2500°N 82.4667°E
- Country: India
- State: Andhra Pradesh
- District: Kakinada
- Talukas: Thondangi
- Elevation: 11 m (36 ft)

Languages
  - Official: Telugu
- Time zone: UTC+5:30 (IST)
- PIN: 533408
- Vehicle Registration: AP05 (Former); AP39 (from 30 January 2019)

Thond-angi or Tond-angi is a village and a mandal in Kakinada district in the state of Andhra Pradesh in India.

== Geography ==
Tondangi is located at 17.2500°N 82.4667°E. It has an average elevation of 11 meters (39 feet).
