= Tuni =

- City
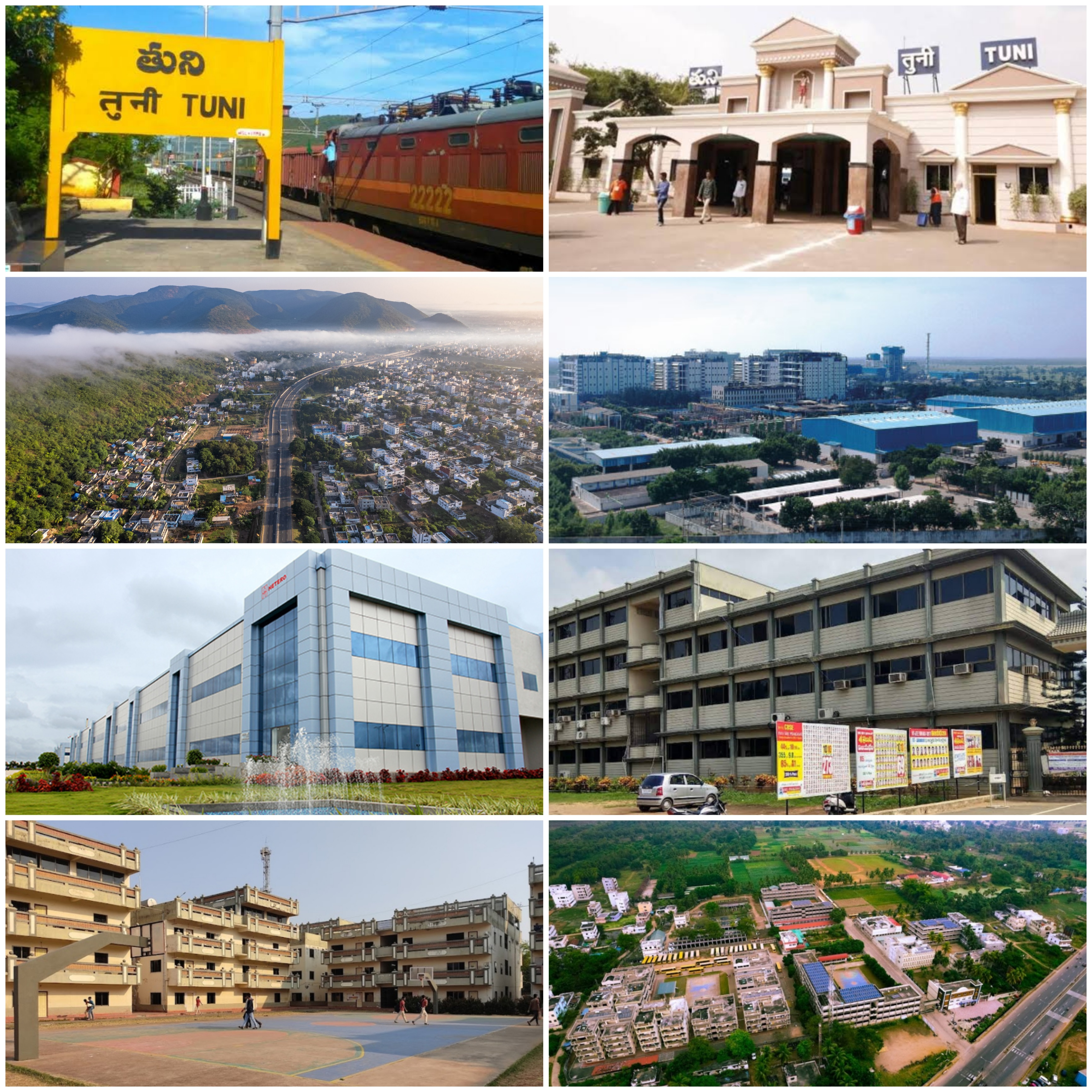
- Nickname: Mango City
- Location in Andhra Pradesh, India
- Coordinates: 17.35°N 82.55°E
- Country: India
- State: Andhra Pradesh
- Region: Coastal Andhra
- District: Kakinada

Government
  - MLA: Yanamala Divya (TDP)

Area
  - Total: 64.02 km^{2} (24.72 sq mi)
- Elevation: 14 m (46 ft)

Population (2011)
  - Total: 254,448
  - Density: 3,975/km^{2} (10,290/sq mi)

Languages
  - Official: Telugu
- Time zone: UTC+5:30 (IST)
- PIN: 533401
- Telephone code: 91–08854
- Vehicle Registration: AP05 (Former); AP39 (from 30 January 2019)
- Currency: Indian Rupee, INR
- Railway Station: Tuni railway station
- Police: Andhra Pradesh Police

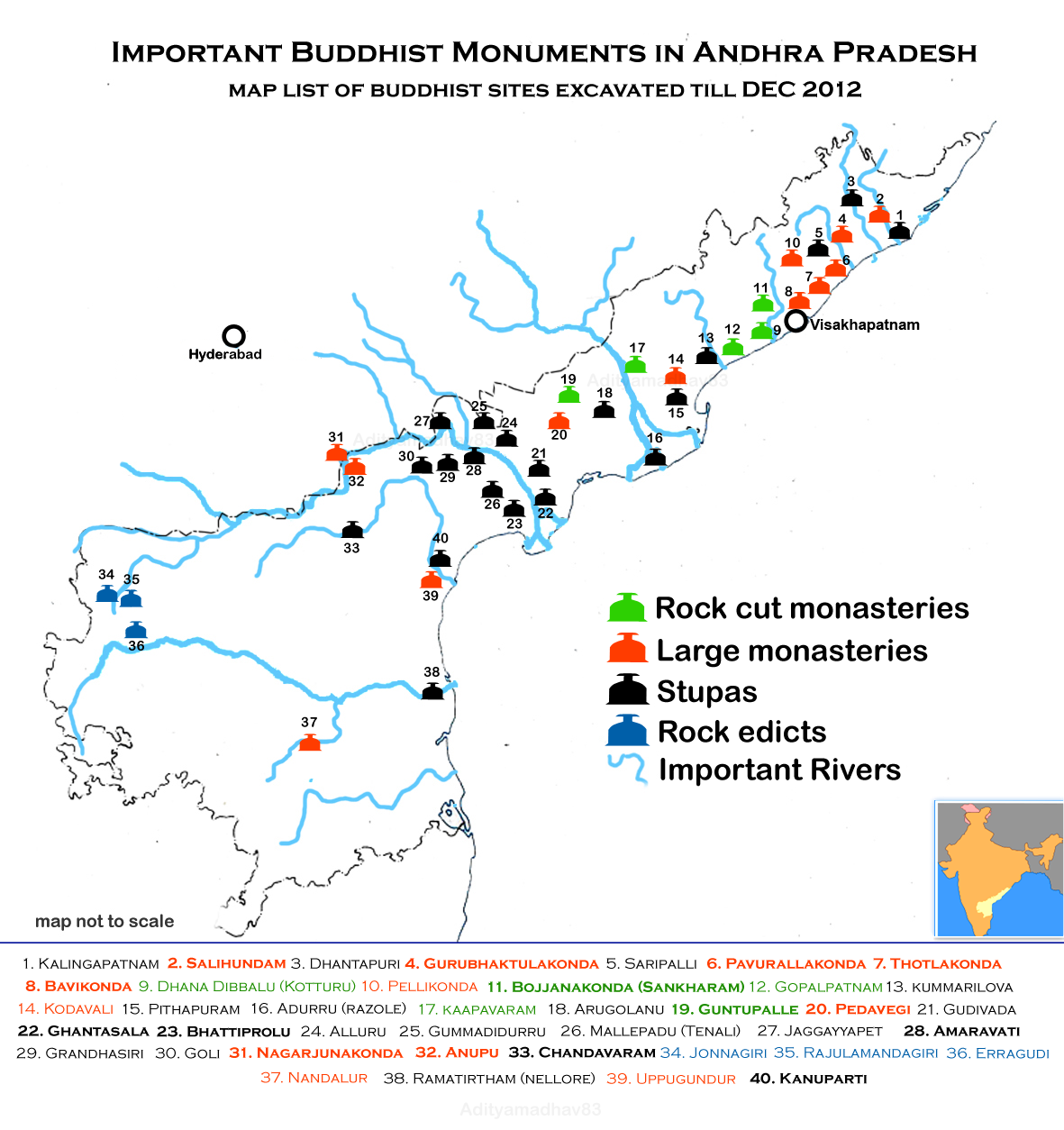
'KummariLova,' near Tuni on the banks of Thandava River, is an important Buddhist site in Andhra Pradesh

Tuni is a city in Kakinada district of the Indian state of Andhra Pradesh. It is the second biggest city in Kakinada district. Freedom fighter Alluri Sitaramaraju studied here. It is a commercial marketing centre for more than 200 surrounding villages in the district. Tuni is a border point for the district of Kakinada. It is known for mango production, with nearly 250 varieties being exported from the area; Tuni City is known as "Mango City". Tuni is also known for the production of betel leaves and jute bags. A variety of cashew nuts are produced in Tuni.

== History ==
Before starting to be known as Tuni, it was called Tundi during the Vishnukundina dynasty period. Tuni as a historical site may date back to the 1st century CE in connection with Buddhism, which flourished in the nearby hillocks and villages such as Gopalapatnam, Satyavaram and Kummarilova, near the city of Tuni on the banks of the Thandava River. The Buddhist monks would have resided in Kummarilova village (Kummararam) from the 2nd century CE to 6th century CE and propagated Buddhism. The Buddhist aramas and stupas found in the village are testimony for their presence, they said. This village is called "Panchasheela Buddhist Centre" as five Buddhist stupas have been found here. Archaeologists found a Buddhist site at Kummarilova during a general survey carried out recently in the area.

Under the Kshatriyas of Vatsavai Dynasty, it was a Pargana (a sub-division in 15th century) in Keemarseema. After the division it became the capital of Kottam Estate. Tuni has been a marketplace since the 19th century CE.

The Tuni Railway station was important for the Howrah-Madras railway line during the time of British India and after Independence.

Raja Kalasala is one of the oldest schools in Tuni with a history of more than 100 years. A guerrilla war fighter during the Indian independence movement, Alluri Sitarama Raju, studied here. A statue of him was built at a junction.

== Demographics ==
As per the census of India 2021, Tuni had population of 254,448 of which 123,442 were males while 131,006 were females. The literacy rate within Tuni was 77.40%, higher than the state average of 67.02%. The male literacy rate was 82.79%, while the female literacy rate was 72.38%.

== Geography ==
Tuni is at 17.35°N 82.55°E. It has an average elevation of 16 metres (46 ft)

=== Climate ===
Climate data for Tuni (Machilipatnam) 1991–2020, extremes 1995–2020
Month	Jan	Feb	Mar	Apr	May	Jun	Jul	Aug	Sep	Oct	Nov	Dec	Year
Record high °C (°F)	35.3 (95.5)	38.8 (101.8)	41.6 (106.9)	43.0 (109.4)	47.5 (117.5)	47.5 (117.5)	41.4 (106.5)	39.5 (103.1)	39.0 (102.2)	38.8 (101.8)	37.0 (98.6)	34.3 (93.7)	47.5 (117.5)
Mean daily maximum °C (°F)	30.1 (86.2)	32.2 (90.0)	34.9 (94.8)	36.3 (97.3)	37.8 (100.0)	35.8 (96.4)	33.6 (92.5)	33.4 (92.1)	33.5 (92.3)	32.9 (91.2)	31.8 (89.2)	30.4 (86.7)	33.5 (92.3)
Mean daily minimum °C (°F)	19.3 (66.7)	20.8 (69.4)	23.6 (74.5)	25.9 (78.6)	27.5 (81.5)	27.0 (80.6)	26.1 (79.0)	26.0 (78.8)	25.7 (78.3)	24.5 (76.1)	22.0 (71.6)	19.6 (67.3)	24.0 (75.2)
Record low °C (°F)	12.6 (54.7)	14.1 (57.4)	17.2 (63.0)	19.5 (67.1)	18.4 (65.1)	22.9 (73.2)	22.1 (71.8)	21.4 (70.5)	22.8 (73.0)	19.8 (67.6)	16.0 (60.8)	14.6 (58.3)	12.6 (54.7)
Average rainfall mm (inches)	5.7 (0.22)	11.4 (0.45)	11.7 (0.46)	41.3 (1.63)	56.8 (2.24)	158.3 (6.23)	174.3 (6.86)	169.3 (6.67)	227.5 (8.96)	199.3 (7.85)	61.2 (2.41)	17.3 (0.68)	1,134.1 (44.65)
Average rainy days	0.5	0.6	0.8	2.3	3.4	8.1	11.2	10.7	11.0	8.4	2.3	0.7	59.8
Average relative humidity (%) (at 17:30 IST)	64	62	64	67	65	65	69	71	75	73	66	62	67
Source: India Meteorological Department

== Economy ==
Tuni is a commercial hub for Kakinada and Anakapalli Districts. One of the oldest sugar factories of Andhra Pradesh, "Tandava Sugars", is here. A large number of handloom industries, about 20 cashew nut industries, hetero industries, Deccan finechemicals pvt ltd (Major Chemical factory) and 10 other chemical industries are in and around Tuni.

== Assembly constituency ==
Tuni is an assembly constituency (consisting of mandals: Kotananduru, Tuni and Thondangi) in Andhra Pradesh. As of 2024, there are a total of 2,24,702 electors in the constituency.

== Transport ==
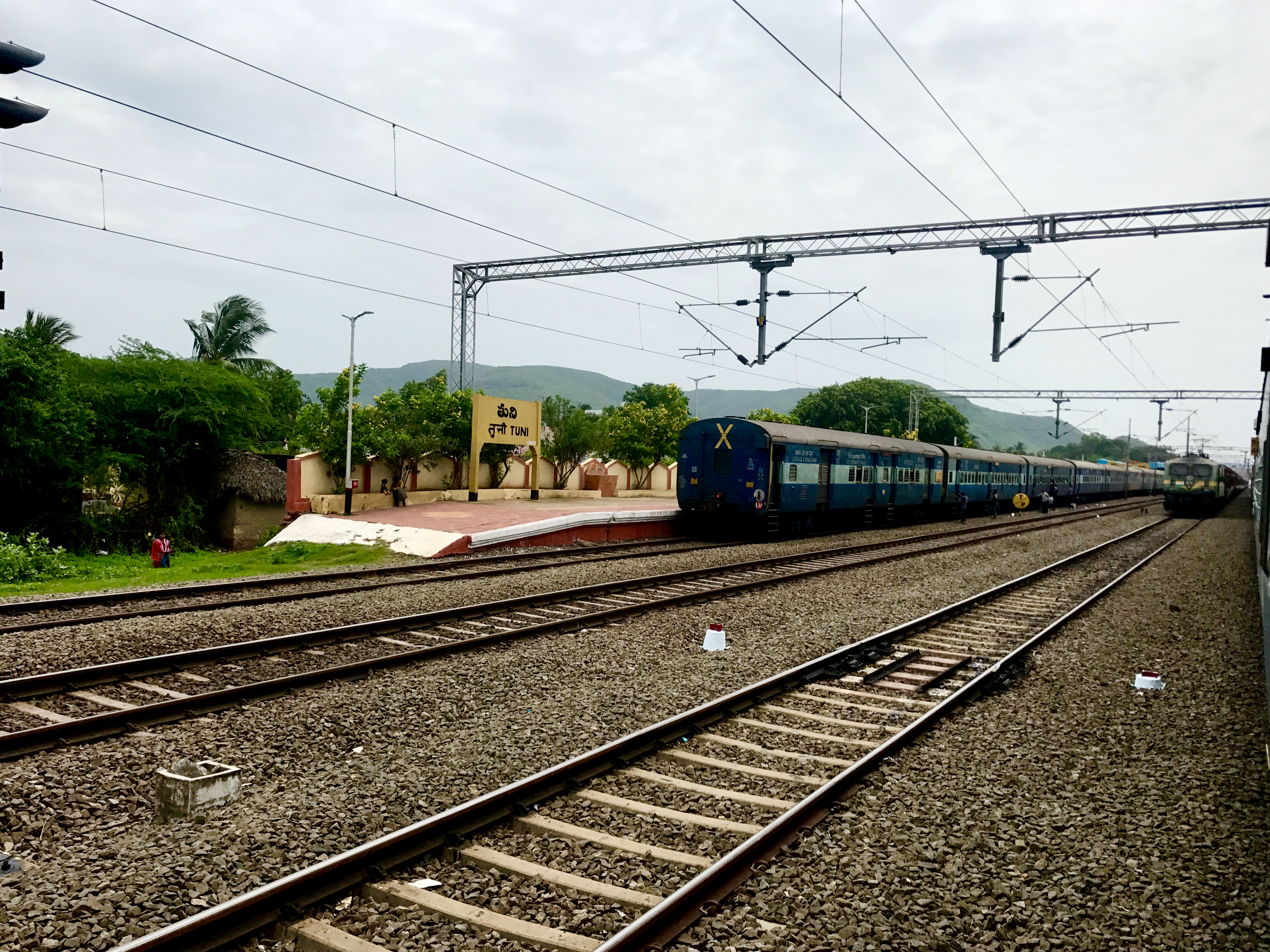
Tuni railway station

=== Railways ===
Tuni railway station is classified as an NSG-3 category station, it is managed by vijayawada railway division in south coast railway zone of indian railways. It is the 214th busiest station in the country. Recently Tuni Railway station underwent major overhaul under Amrit Bharat Station Scheme (ABSS) which significantly improved amenities in the rail way station.

=== Roads ===
Tuni is well connected to the state and the rest of India with a network of state and national highways. NH 16 passes through the Tuni City. National Highway 16, a part of Golden Quadrilateral highway network, bypasses the City. The Andhra Pradesh State Road Transport Corporation operates bus services from Tuni bus station. Tuni is located on Howrah-Chennai main line. Rajahmundry Airport is located 95 km (59 mi) west-southwest of Tuni. Alluri Sita Ramaraju International Airport is situated approximately 140 km distance northeast of Tuni.

== Education ==
Tuni plays a major role in education for urban and rural students from nearby villages. Primary and secondary school education is provided by government, aided and private schools, under the School Education Department of the state. Instruction is available in both English and Telugu.

== Schools ==
- Anjana E.M School
- Arka E.M School
- Bashyam school
- Connossa E.M School
- Dream India School
- EuroKids Pre-School (AC campus)
- Tirumala school
- Gayathri Public School
- Gowtham Model School
- Government girls High school
- Government Raja High school
- Loyola School
- Manna Public School
- Shemford School
- Ravinadra bharathi school
- Sri Prakash vidyaniketan
- Siddhartha High school
- Siddartha Public School
- Sri Matha EM school
- Sri Chaitanya
- Sri chaitanya E.M School
- Sunflower Em School
- Samayamanthula Reddy Government High School
- Shemford Little Stars School
- Vivekavardhani English Medium School
- Vijaya Public School
- Narayana e techno school
- Tagore Convent School

== Colleges ==
- Aditya Degree College
- Aditya ITI college
- Tirumala junior College
- Gayatri junior college
- Gayatri Degree college
- Raja Government Junior College
- Government Degree college
- Government Women's Collage
- Government I.T.I College
- Narayana Junior College
- Noble ITI
- Sri Prakash Junior College
- Sri Prakash Engineering College
- Sri Prakash degree College
- Sri Prakash PG College
- Siddhartha Junior College
- Siddhartha Degree College
- viveka Junior college
- viveka Degree college
- Vinanda Junior College
- Vinanda Degree College
- vaishnavi Junior College
- Sri karthikeya Junior College
- SV Junior College
- SV Degree college
- Vision ITI College

== Notable people ==
- Alluri Sita Rama Raju, a freedom fighter
- Avasarala Ramakrishna Rao, a Telugu short story writer
- Vempati Sadasiva Brahmam, a Telugu writer of film stories, dialogues and lyrics, in the early period of Telugu cinema
- Chandra Sekhar Yeleti, Telugu film director
