= Telugu Christians =

Ethnic Telugus who follow Christianity

Telugu Christians తెలుగు క్రైస్తవులు
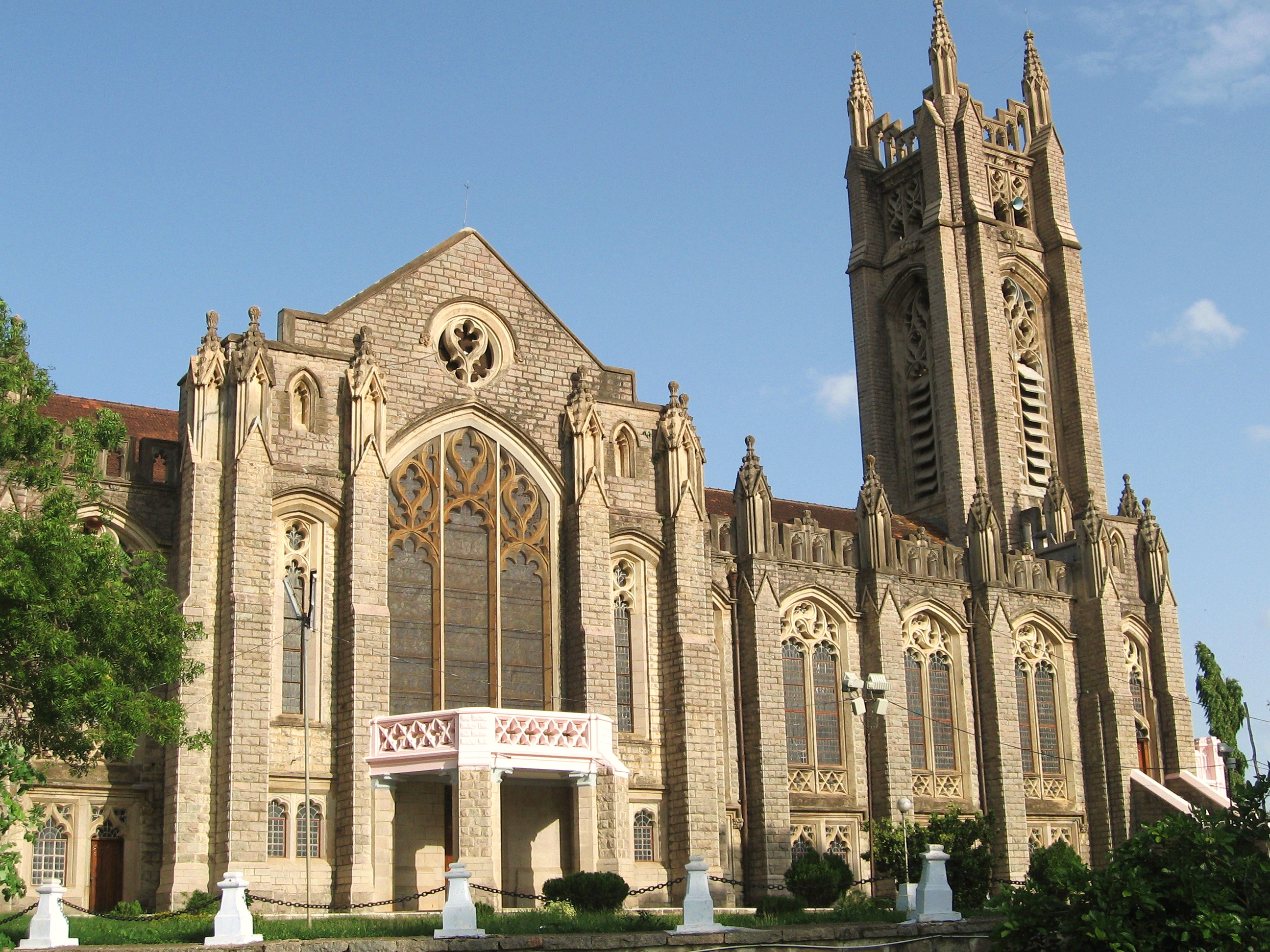
- Medak Cathedral in Medak, Telangana, India

Total population
- 1,567,784 (2011)

Regions with significant populations
- Predominantly in Hyderabad, Coastal Andhra, Secunderabad, the Northern Circars and Medak, also found among Non-Resident Indian and Person of Indian Origin diaspora populations nationwide in the major cities such as New Delhi, Bangalore, Mumbai, Calcutta, Chennai, Mangalore and also overseas countries

Religions
- Predominantly United Protestant (Church of South India), India Pentecostal Church of God, Assemblies of God in India, Lutheran, Methodist, Baptist but also significant number of Roman Catholics and Evangelicals

Languages
- Telugu

Telugu Christians or Telugu Kraistava (Telugu: తెలుగు క్రైస్తవులు, romanized: Telugu Kraistavulu) are ethnic-Telugus who follow Christianity. They form the third largest religious minority in the Indian states of Andhra Pradesh and Telangana. According to the 2001 Census of India, there are over a million Christians in Andhra Pradesh, constituting around 1.51% of the state's population.

Most Telugu Christians are Protestant, belonging to major Indian Protestant denominations such as the predominant United Protestant Church of South India, Pentecostals such as Assemblies of God in India, India Pentecostal Church of God, The Pentecostal Mission, the Andhra Evangelical Lutheran Church, the Samavesam of Telugu Baptist Churches, the Salvation Army and several others. There also are significant numbers of Roman Catholics and Evangelicals. The Franciscans of the Roman Catholic Church brought Christianity to the Deccan area in 1535, and after 1759 AD, when the Northern Circars came under the rule of the East India Company, the region opened up to greater Christian influence.

The first Protestant missionaries in Andhra Pradesh were two clergymen named Cran and Des Granges who were sent by the London Missionary Society and set up their station at Visakhapatnam in 1805 AD. Regions with significant populations of Telugu Christians include the erstwhile Northern Circars, the coastal belt and the cities of Hyderabad and Secunderabad. Telugu Christians have one of the highest literacy and work participation figures and most even male-to-female ratio figures among the various religious communities in the state.

== History and spread ==
=== Northern Circars and Coastal Belt regions ===
The first convert to Christianity in Andhra Pradesh was Thumma Hanumantha Reddy, also known as Manda Reddy. Manda Reddy, along with thirty Reddy families of Muddiguba and some other Reddy families in Alamuru, embraced Christianity in 1715. In the Rayalaseema region, many Reddys began visiting churches and converted to Christianity (Catholics). By 1735, in South Andhra, there were thousands of Christians, most of whom belonged to the Reddy and other traditional weaver communities. Many reddys in Guntur district have converted in to Roman Catholisim, Reddy who converted to Roman Catholics still kept some the Hindu traditions like thali, bottu, some the Catholic reddys have migrated Telangana via krishna river in Telangana they named their village names has Guntur pally, Reddypuram or Reddypallem. By 1750, Christianity further spread to the Circar Districts due to the migration of Christian Reddys into those areas. In the early 18th century many Catholic Reddys had migrated from Rayalaseema to some parts of Tamil Nadu, Andhra and Telangana. They started Catholic churches to support Christian missionaries.

Beginning in the nineteenth century, missionaries from most major denominations started arriving in the Andhra region. Established in 1805, the London Missionary Society was the first Protestant mission in Andhra Pradesh which had its station at Visakhapatnam. The London Missionary Society was a non-denominational missionary society formed in England in 1795 by evangelical Anglicans and Nonconformists who were largely Congregationalist in outlook. George Crann and Augustus Des Granges were the first batch of missionaries that was sent out by the London Missionary Society to Andhra Pradesh in 1804. They arrived in Visakhapatnam on 18 July 1805 and began learning the Telugu language. They mastered it in a short time and began translating parts of the New Testament. In the next three years, the four Gospels were published. Their work was halted with the deaths of George Crann in 1809 and of Des Granges in 1810. A new batch of missionaries, Revs. Lee, Gordon and Pritchett took over the work done by their predecessors. The first complete New Testament in Telugu was printed in Madras.

==== Baptist missions ====
The American Baptist Mission and Godavari Delta Mission established their stations in 1836. They were followed by Church Missionary Society in 1841 and the then American Lutheran Mission in 1842. British colonial officers, Eurasians, and the likely presence of a few native Christian families has made missionary activity a possibility in these early years. Telugu Baptist pastors like Puroshottam Choudhary and Das Anthervedy from the Telugu-speaking districts of Madras Presidency.

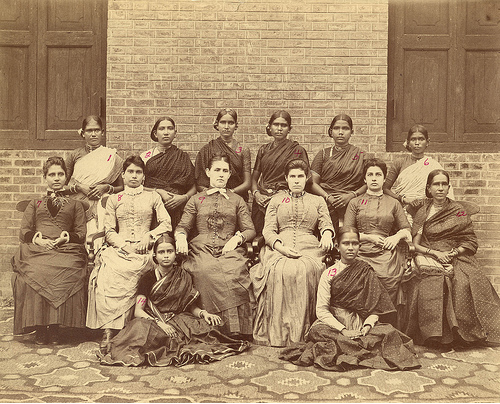
Telugu Christian women with missionaries c. 1879

Amos Sutton was the first British Baptist missionary to preach in the region. He was sent by the Serampore Mission. He preached in the northernmost parts of Andhra in 1805 but failed to achieve his objectives, and he did not venture again into the region, confining his ministry instead to the Oriya-speaking districts. Sutton, however, persisted in his vision for the Telugus. Later, Sutton's marriage to an American Baptist missionary widow connected him with the American Baptists. While visiting his relatives in the United States in 1835, he urged the Baptist convention in Virginia to take over the "abandoned" work among the Telugus. Responding to his plea, the American Baptist Foreign Mission Board sent Samuel S. Day, a Canadian-born American, as their missionary in 1835. He arrived in Visakhapatnam in 1836 and searched for four years for a suitable place to start a mission station before finally finding one in Nellore. This lay the foundations of the Canadian Baptist Mission.

The Canadian Baptist Mission (CBM) was established in 1850. Lyman Jewett in 1848 and John E. Clough in 1865 joined the mission stations at Nellore, Ongole and south Kanigiri. Canadian Baptist Missionaries quickly identified the possibility of holistic transformation of the Telugu society through education, and they found women to be potential agents of change. Missionary Mary McLaurin, in 1875, founded a school for boys and the next year founded one for girls. Missionaries of the Canadian Baptist Mission founded the Convention of Baptist Churches of Northern Circars (CBCNC) as the mission's successor in Andhra Pradesh.

==== Lutheran missions ====
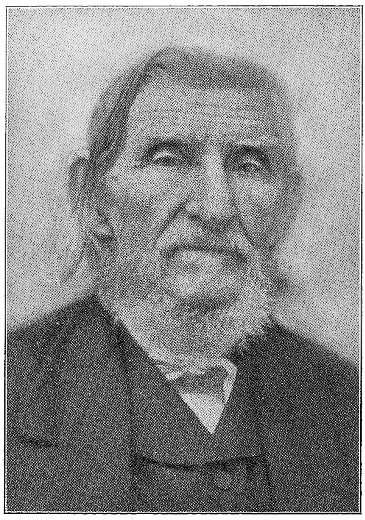
John Christian Frederick Heyer, the first Lutheran missionary to Andhra Pradesh in 1842

The first Lutheran missionary in Andhra was John Christian Frederick Heyer who arrived in the year 1842 AD. His wife and children remained in Friedens, Somerset County, Pennsylvania where Mrs. Mary Heyer died in 1839. The following year, Heyer was asked to enter the foreign missions. He studied Sanskrit and medicine in Baltimore, and set sail for India from Boston in 1841 with three other missionary couples on the ship Brenda. Returning to the United States in 1845, he continued his missionary work and established St. John's Church in Baltimore. At the same time, he studied medicine, and obtained his M.D. from the University of Maryland School of Medicine in 1847.

He travelled to India a second time in 1847, spending a decade, mainly in the Guntur district of Andhra Pradesh state, in southern India, where he ministered and performed yeoman service to the people there. Supported initially by the Pennsylvania Ministerium, and later by the Foreign Mission Board of the General Synod, Heyer was also encouraged and assisted by British government officials. He established a number of hospitals and a network of schools throughout the Guntur region. The two prominent Lutheran missions in Coastal Andhra were the Guntur Mission pioneered by John Christian Frederick Heyer of the Pennsylvania Synod Society and the Rajahmundry Mission established by Rev. Luis P. Manno Valett of North German Missionary Society in July 1845. In 1927 the Andhra Evangelical Lutheran Church was constituted with the merger of both these missions.

The history of the South Andhra Lutheran Church can be dated back to the year 1865 when Rev. August Mylius of the Hermaunsburg Evangelical Lutheran Mission (HELM), Germany began his evangelistic work in the southern part of Andhra i.e. the present districts of Nellore, Prakasham and Chittoor. World War I forced the German missionaries to leave India in 1915. In 1920, after a period of five years, the American missionaries from Ohio Lutheran Evangelical Mission (OLEM) took charge of the abruptly ended work of the German missionaries. Later in 1929 the church governance was taken over by the American Lutheran Church. The year of Indian Independence (1947) was also the birth year of the South Andhra Lutheran Church.

The famous British officer Arthur Cotton worked alongside missionaries like Rev. Henry Fox of the Church Mission Society, Mr. Bowden (SPG) of the Godavari Delta Mission, the Lutherans and Baptists. On Sundays the labour camps where Arthur Cotton supervised resounded with the singing of Christian hymns, songs in various languages such as Telugu, Tamil, and Tribal dialects. Major Cotton himself spoke in many such meetings. He and his staff worked to set a personal example of service and Christian living to the new converts. Therefore, the spread of Christianity in the coastal Andhra area could be attributed to the efforts of Arthur Cotton.

=== Telangana regions ===
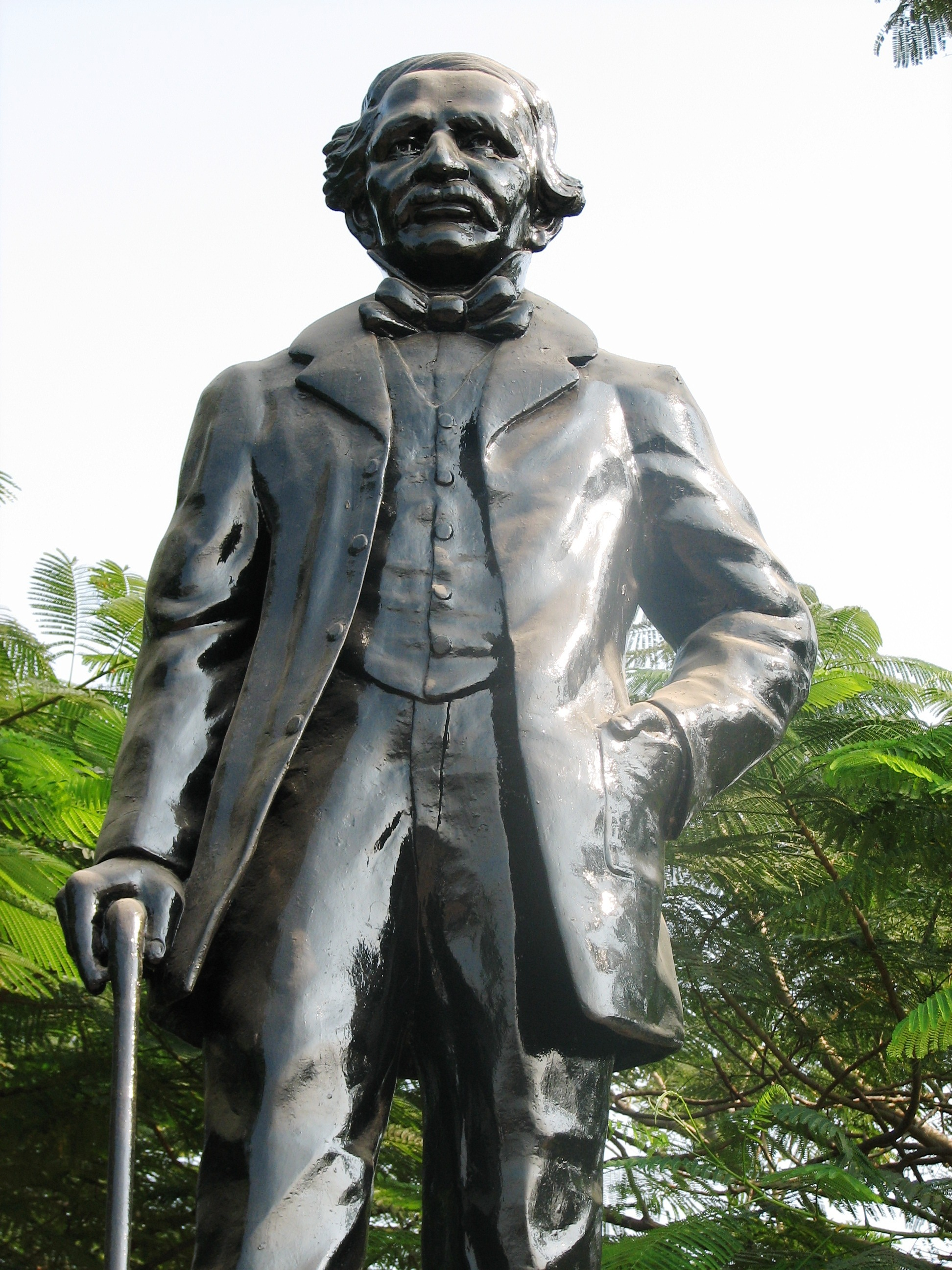
British officer Arthur Cotton played a significant role in the spread of Christianity in Andhra Pradesh

==== Wesleyan Methodist missions ====
Sir Arthur Cotton, a British engineer with the help of two missionaries E.E Jenkins & George Fryar travelled in the Telangana regions. They were responsible for starting work in Sironcha in 1863. The Church Missionary Society started its work in Aurangabad in 1860, which was then part of the Nizam's dominions. Later on William Taylor, a missionary of the Methodist Episcopal Church triggered a great revival in Hyderabad during the years 1872–1874. The work began in Hyderabad as "Hindustani Mission". Meanwhile, the Methodist Missionary Society began its work as "Godavari Mission" which is named after the river. After fifteen years of thorough survey, in 1879 missionaries Henry Little and William Burgess came to Secunderabad from Madras.

William S. Burgess was the founder of the Wesleyan Mission in Hyderabad. The Tamil congregation of the Church of Scotland Mission was handed over to them in 1880 and it became the first native Indian Wesleyan Congregation in Secunderabad, which later moved into its new building in Clock Tower. He laid the foundations of missionary work by organising the migrant Telugu Christians as well as new converts in centres like Chilkalguda, Musheerabad, Market Street as part of the main church in Clock tower as Wesley Church pastorate, Secunderabad. The first congregation in Secunderabad being of Tamil origin, the Church of Scotland Mission, Madras continued to provide Pastors to serve in the Clock Tower Church for a couple of decades. In Hyderabad the Missionaries appointed a Telugu Christian by name Joseph Cornelius in whose house in Boggulagunta, Ramkote Telugu service was held with the help of the Indian Evangelist Benjamin Wesley December 1879. The present Wesley Girls School in Secunderabad with its attached missionary bungalow was purchased in 1884.

William S. Burgess stayed with his family in a dak bungalow as there was no house ready for accommodation. There were no churches to receive him. He began his work first with British soldiers. He was assisted in his work by his Indian counterpart Mr. Joseph Cornelius. The first baptism was administered by Burgess on 25 January 1880. His first convert was Andrew, son of Chakkariah, who is one of the forerunners of many Christians in the Medak Diocese. Burgess rode on horse-back, much like John Wesley, preaching in the Telangana regions. As the Telugu congregation was growing a church was constructed in the Sultan Bazaar area in 1910. Later in 1927 a foundation stone was laid to construct a large church in Ramkote which is the existing Wesley Church, Ramkote which was dedicated by Rev. Charles Walker Posnett in 1931.

The Madras Synod sent Rev. Benjamin P. Wesley to help the Burgesses. He came from Cuddapah and was a well-educated man. Benjamin P. Wesley was ordained as a Wesleyan Minister in 1882. Rev. Benjamin P. Wesley along with Mrs. Burgess set about establishing educational institutions in and around Hyderabad and Secunderabad. In 1882, Burgess bought some shops which he used to set up side rooms for a school. Another missionary Rev. Benjamin Pratt also arrived in 1880. These trio Burgess, Pratt and Benjamin Wesley used to travel on cart, and bullock bandies to preach in the surrounding areas. Pratt surveyed Karimnagar area, following which he established the Wesleyan headquarters there. This laid the foundations of the current Karimnagar diocese of the Church of South India. During those days the district headquarters was located near Ellagandala, which was eight miles away from Karimnagar. Around the same time, Benjamin Wesley made Siddipet his headquarters, laying the foundations for the diocese of Medak, where later the cathedral at Medak was built. The regions of Hyderabad and Secunderabad were ministered by the Burgesses.

==== Anglican missions ====
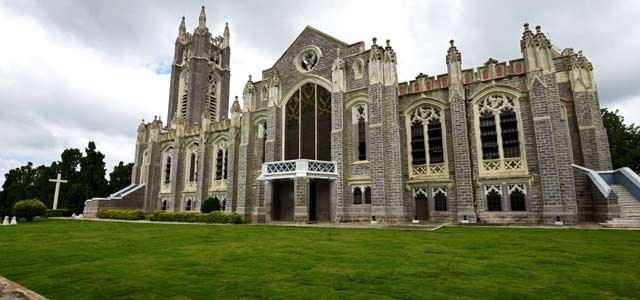
The Church of South India Cathedral at Medak. It is considered to be one of the largest churches in Asia

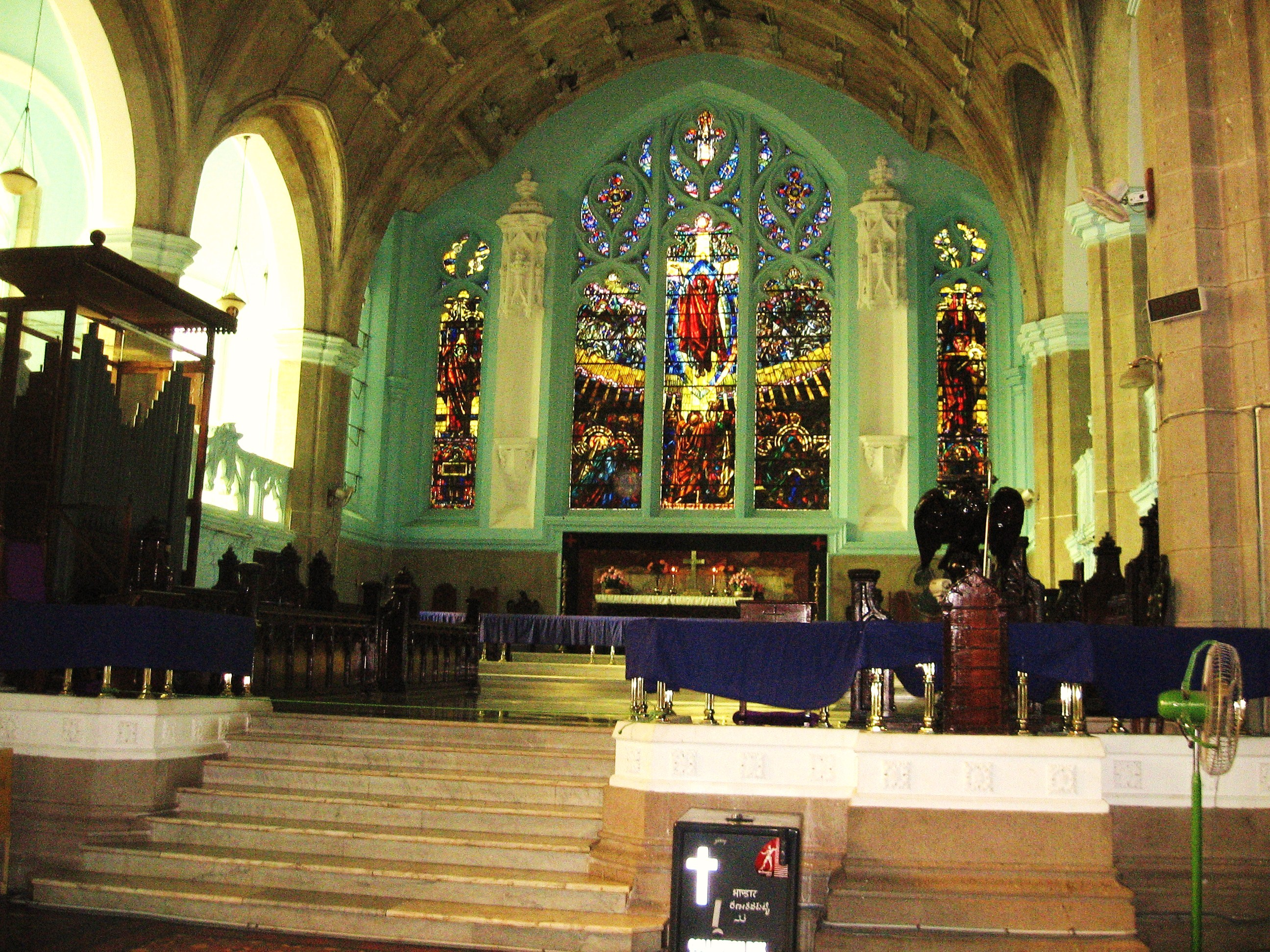
View of the altar in Medak Cathedral

Rev. Charles Walker Posnett (the builder of the great Cathedral at Medak) arrived in Secunderabad in 1895. He first ministered among the British soldiers at Trimulgherry. Unsatisfied with the army work, he launched forth into villages. In the year 1896, Rev. Charles Walker Posnett visited a village called Medak and built a bungalow there by staying in a dock bungalow. There were then hardly two hundred Christians in the whole of Medak area. There was no railway route to Medak in those days. The journey of 60 miles (97 km) from Hyderabad had to be done on horseback and Rev. Posnett usually did it in a day. When he came to Medak, there was a small tiled house as the place of worship. Rev.Posnett soon raised a moderate structure on that very spot just enough for the Christian community within the Mission Compound in the traditional shape of a church. He thought it was not a worthy place for worshiping his Lord Jesus Christ. He began building the present Medak Cathedral in 1914 on a sprawling 1,000 acres (4.0 km^{2}) of land in the Ghusnabad area. He built the cathedral during a famine. The starving villagers were provided food in return for their services towards building the cathedral.

The Diocese of Dornakal was founded on 29 December 1912, when the Rev. Vedanaygam Samuel Azariah was consecrated its first Bishop in St. Paul's Cathedral, Calcutta. The real significance of the ceremony lay in the fact that Bishop Azariah was the first Indian to be consecrated a Bishop of the Anglican Communion. When it was first formed in 1912, the Diocese of Dornakal was quite a small diocese in the south-east corner of the Nizam's Dominions. A few years later it was enlarged by the addition of the District of Dummagudem, in which the Church Mission Society was working. Then came a Resolution of the Episcopal Synod in the year 1920, which transformed this comparatively small diocese into a diocese which has now probably as large, if not a larger number of Anglican Indian Christians than any other in India. By this resolution all the Mission Districts of both the Church Missionary Society and the Society for the Propagation of the Gospel in the Telugu country, were placed under the Episcopal jurisdiction of the Bishop of Dornakal. This means that the present Diocese of Dornakal includes a large portion of the Krishna district, together with the part of the Godavari district named Dummagudem; parts of the Kurnool and Cuddapah districts to the south occupied by the Society for the Propagation of the Gospel; also the areas in the Hyderabad State occupied by the Indian Missionary Society of Tinnevelly, the Singareni Mission, the Khammamett Mission (formerly under the Church Missionary Society), and the then recently formed Dornakal Diocesan Mission.

=== Catholicism ===
The Franciscans of the Catholic Church brought Catholicism to the Deccan Area in 1535. The Roman Catholic Diocese of Hyderabad was only formed in 1886. A study of the social background of the Telugu Christians of the 18th century reveals that the majority of Telugu Roman Catholics came from two great communities of farmers. According to the French Jesuits, the Telugu Christians were fervent Christians. Christians and Hindus got along fairly peacefully.

The Christian sanyasis of Andhra worked with the permission of the local authorities, which enabled them to spread the gospel with the greatest possible freedom. The relations between the French and the Nizam and his nawabs were on the whole cordial enough.

The Muslim authorities tended to favour and protect the 'Roman Fakirs' and their disciples. The Christian contribution to culture and scientific studies was considerable. Apart from preaching the gospel, the French priests evinced keen interest in scientific study, especially in the field of mathematics and astronomy. Most of them were trained mathematicians, and some even in astronomy. They knew Telugu well, and some even knew Tamil, Telugu, Kannada, Marathi and Hindustani. A fairly large number of Christian writings in Telugu belonging to the 18th century have survived. In c. 1735, one of the priests gave a text of the Gospel of St John to the Palayakar of Kottakotta. A history of the Old Testament called Purva Vedam, Rajula Charitra, Amrutham Bhavan, and a life of Christ were among the writings that were revered by the Telugu Roman Catholics. There were some apologetic, catechetical and theological writings such as Nistara Ratnakaramu (Ocean of Salvation), Anitya Nitya Vivastam (Difference between the Temporal and the Eternal) and Vedanta Saramu (Essence of Theology). Sanskrit prayers were translated into Telugu; so also many popular poems were produced. There were many writings on linguistics. Fr G L Coeurdoux (died 1799) is the author of a Telugu-Sanskrit-French dictionary, and of a French-Telugu and Telugu-French dictionary. Fr Pierre de la Lane (died 1746) wrote a Telugu grammar in c. 1729, and also a Telugu dictionary entitled Amara Sinham. A number of Jesuit missionaries studied Sanskrit as it contained all the philosophical writings of Hinduism. A number of Jesuit missionaries were keen on observations and experiments in astronomy, among whom the names of Le Gac, Ducros, Duchamp, Gargam and Calmette stand out. Geography and Geology were included in their field of scientific interest. The description of Gargan's journey of September- November 1730 through the southern districts of Andhra and information on geology, such as the quarries of Cambam and the diamond mines of the eastern side of Terramula, were of special interest.

=== Post independence ===
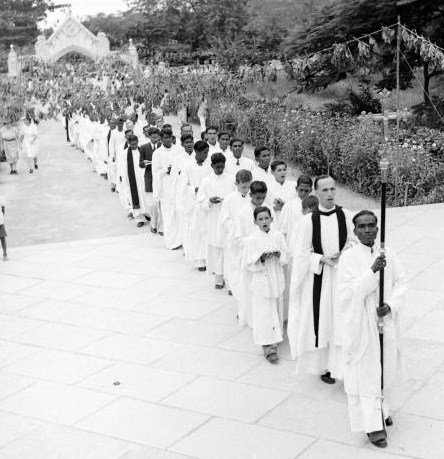
Inauguration of the Church of South India at Medak Cathedral on 27 September 1947

Following the Indian Independence in 1947, all properties that belonged to the erstwhile missions and churches that were part of British cantonments in the region of Andhra Pradesh were bequeathed to Telugu Christians. Several major denominations were also formed during this period.

The Church of South India, the result of the union of churches of varying traditions Anglican, Methodist, Congregational, Presbyterian, and Reformed was inaugurated in September 1947, after protracted negotiation among the churches concerned. In the Telugu regions, the London Missionary Society, the Society of Propagation of the Gospel, the Church Mission Society, the Church of Scotland Mission, and the Wesleyan Methodists along with several other denominations and missions came together to form part of the Church of South India. Medak Diocese was formed during the same period. It is one of the biggest dioceses in the Church of South India, comprising 1100 congregations in 71 pastorates and spread over five revenue districts of Telangana region of Andhra Pradesh state namely Adilabad, Medak, Nizamabad, Rangareddy and the cities of Hyderabad and Secunderabad. The first Bishop of Medak Diocese was Rt. Rev. Frank Whittaker.

The existing Church of South India dioceses in the state of Andhra Pradesh are as follows:

- Dornakal Diocese
- Karimnagar Diocese
- Krishna-Godavari Diocese
- Medak Diocese
- Nandyal Diocese
- Rayalaseema Diocese

The Andhra Evangelical Lutheran Church was formed in 1927. At present it spreads over 500 miles (800 km) of the Coromandel Coast (east coast of India) covering the important cities and districts in Andhra Pradesh and having a congregational membership of around 3 million in 400 parishes. It is the third largest Lutheran church in Asia.

The year of Indian independence, 1947, was also the birth year of South Andhra Lutheran Church. Since 1949 the church became independent and got all the properties and institutions from foreign missionary societies. In the present day scenario the church has 90,000 members in 44 parishes. The church runs five secondary schools, five boarding homes and hostels, couple of technical schools and institutes and a hospital.

The Convention of Baptist Churches of Northern Circars (CBCNC) is a Christian denomination in north coastal Andhra Pradesh. Missionaries of the Canadian Baptist Mission founded this denomination as its successor in Andhra Pradesh. Canadian Baptist Mission (CBM) was established by the Baptist Missionaries of Canada c. 1850. One of the well known Telugu Christian leaders, Rev. Dr. A. B. Masilamani served as the president of the CBCNC for several years.

The Samavesam of Telugu Baptist Churches, formed in 1962, is a registered organisation consisting of 1,214 independent Baptist churches. American Baptists started missionary work in South India among Telugu-speaking people in 1836. In 1887 the existing churches were organised into the Convention of Telugu Baptist Churches. In 1962 the convention became the Samavesam of Telugu Baptist Churches, with a unanimously adopted constitution. The organisation was registered in 1963. The Samavesam of Telugu Baptist Churches runs educational institutions, hospitals, health centres and one theological seminary, in Ramapatnam. There are five-degree colleges, eight junior colleges, 14 high schools and 14 primary schools. The interdenominational theological college at Hyderabad is affiliated with the Serampore University, Kolkata. The Samavesam has 4,500 Sunday schools with an enrolment of some 72,000 children. They claim to have a congregation of around 840,000.

Andhra Christian Theological College is a special purpose entity – an ecumenical enterprise of some of the church societies in Andhra Pradesh. It was founded in 1964 and is affiliated to the Senate of Serampore College, Serampore, West Bengal. Andhra Christian Theological College came into being as a result of the Kretzmann's Commission which suggested carving out a unified seminary out of existing century-old seminaries catering to the various Church societies in Andhra Pradesh. It was also as a result of ecumenism where a greater need for unity among the Protestant churches was felt worldwide.

== Art and architecture ==
Sacred art does not hold much significance among Telugu Christian communities because the majority of Telugu Christians are Protestant and therefore do not approve of statues or other religious objects of such nature. Church architecture in Andhra Pradesh is rich and diverse. Most churches and cathedrals in the region conform to the Gothic Revival style because the missions which had the greatest influence in the area were either from England or the United States. Unlike in other parts of India such as Goa and Mangalore, the Portuguese played little part in the spread of Christianity in Andhra Pradesh and therefore Andhra Pradesh has very little Baroque architecture. Churches of much architectural value can be found across the length and breadth of Andhra Pradesh even in smaller towns and villages that have been influenced by missionary activity. Christ Lutheran Church in Narsapur, West Godavari is an example of such a church in rural areas. With a red brick exterior, this church is an example of the Gothic Revival style that was greatly used under British patronage. Indian motifs have been delicately incorporated into the architecture of several religious buildings.

In Andhra Pradesh the Church of South India's Medak Cathedral was consecrated on 25 December 1924. Built by the British Wesleyan Methodists, the cathedral is now under the jurisdiction of the Church of South India (CSI) diocese of Medak. It took ten years to complete the cathedral. Its dimensions are 100 ft (30 m) wide and 200 ft (61 m) long and the church can accommodate about 5,000 people at a time. The vaulted roof of the church is sound-proofed with hollow sponge material. When the Nizam of Hyderabad learned that the height of this cathedral would be far more than that of Charminar, he made a vain bid to order that its height should be brought down. The floor of the cathedral is laid with tiles brought in from Italy. The bell-tower of the cathedral is 175 ft (53 m) high. There are three stained-glass windows depicting the Nativity, Crucifixion and Ascension of Jesus Christ, which are a major tourist attraction.

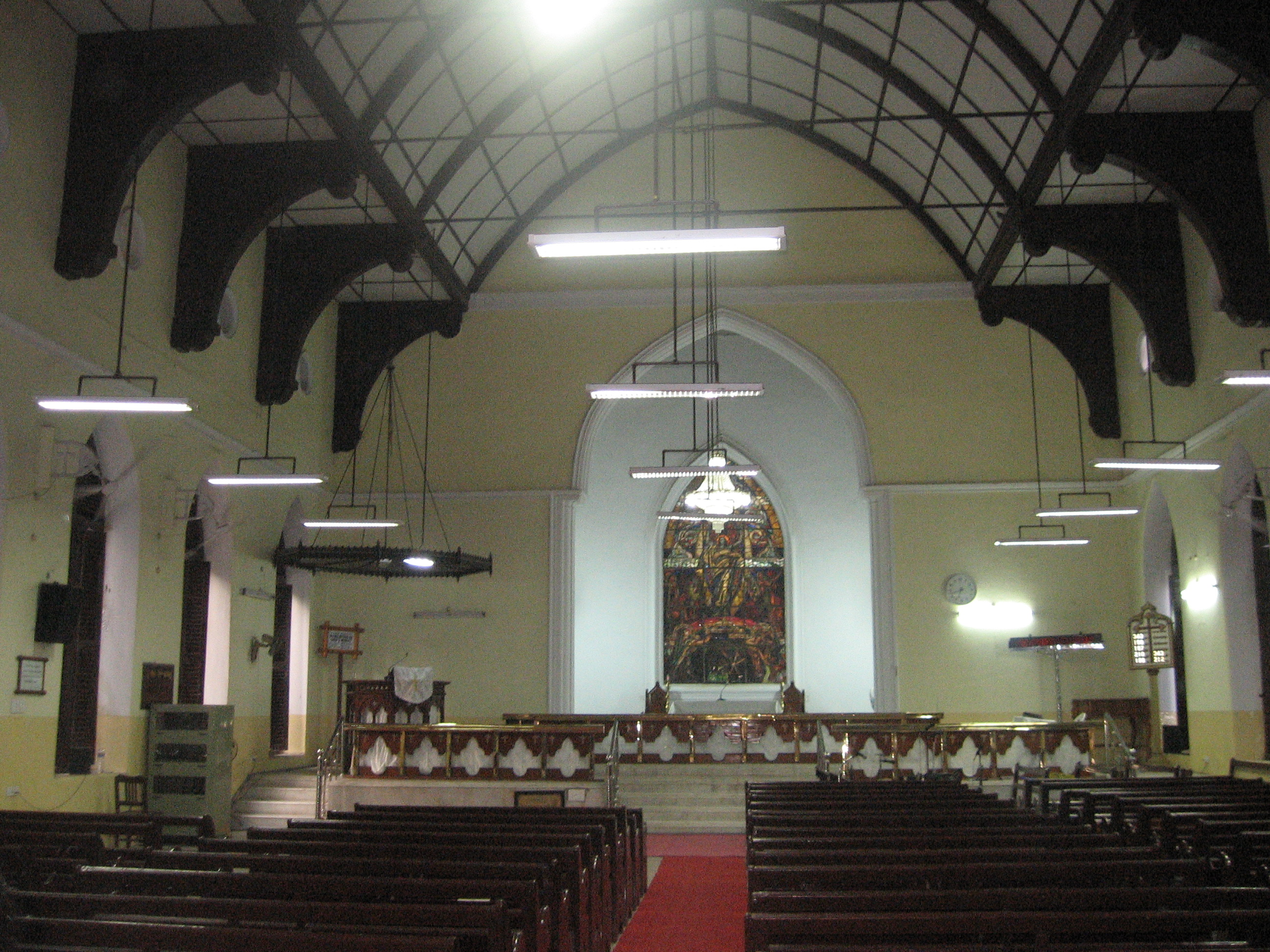
The nave of Wesley Church, Secunderabad.

The cities of Hyderabad and Secunderabad have a greater variety in Church architecture as a result of the cosmopolitan nature of the cities. St Joseph's Cathedral, Hyderabad is one of the few examples of Baroque architecture in Andhra Pradesh. The Catholic character of the church is clearly visible in the architectural style of the church. St. George's Church, Hyderabad in Abids had Gothic architecture and has become a prototype for many churches in city and the region.

Built in 1813, St. John's Church Secunderabad is the oldest church in the city. The church was built according to the Tuscan order, which is a simplified version of the Doric order. Once the cathedral of the Roman Catholic Archdiocese of Hyderabad, St. Mary's Church, Secunderabad is an inspiring piece of architecture. It was built in 1847, incidentally a century before the Indian Independence. The church, although much smaller in size, bears much resemblance to the Cathedral at Medak with both adhering the Gothic Revival architectural style. The All Saints Church, Secunderabad which was constructed in 1860 has received the INTACH award from the government of Andhra Pradesh. It is an example of the Gothic style, with a spires and turrets and a belfry. It was the first permanent structure of the Trimulgherry entrenchment. There are sixteen memorial tablets along the wall and a medium-sized organ. The most historically significant church in the city is the Church of South India's Holy Trinity Church, Bolarum. Commissioned by Queen Victoria of the United Kingdom in 1847, the church's stained glass altar piece, the pulpit and the bell are all in their original state. In the year 1983, Queen Elizabeth II, of the United Kingdom celebrated her 36th wedding anniversary in the Holy Trinity church during her tour of India. The Church service was officiated by the late Bishop Victor Premasagar.

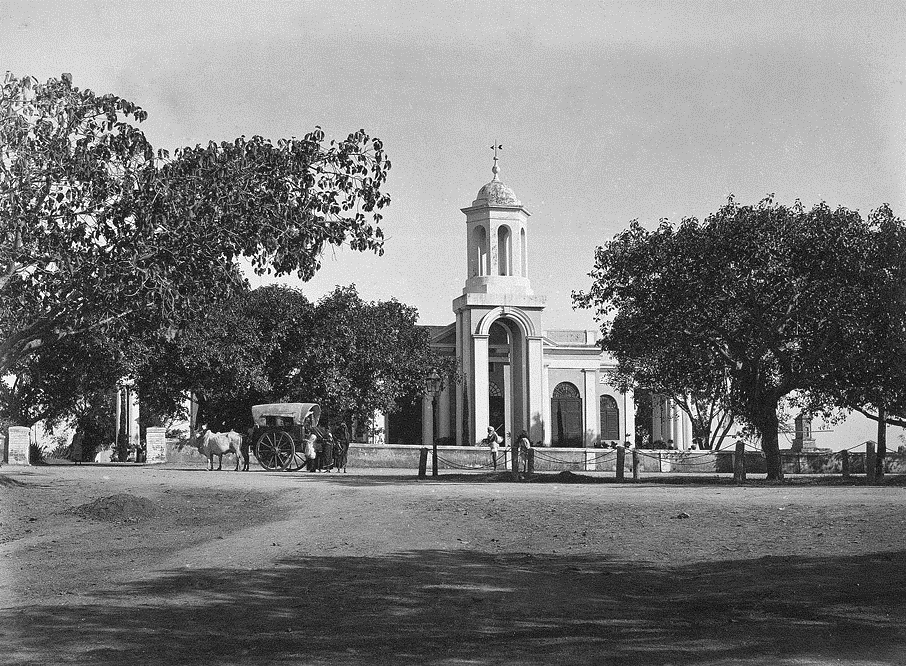
St. John's Church, Secunderabad c. 1890 It is the oldest church in Secunderabad

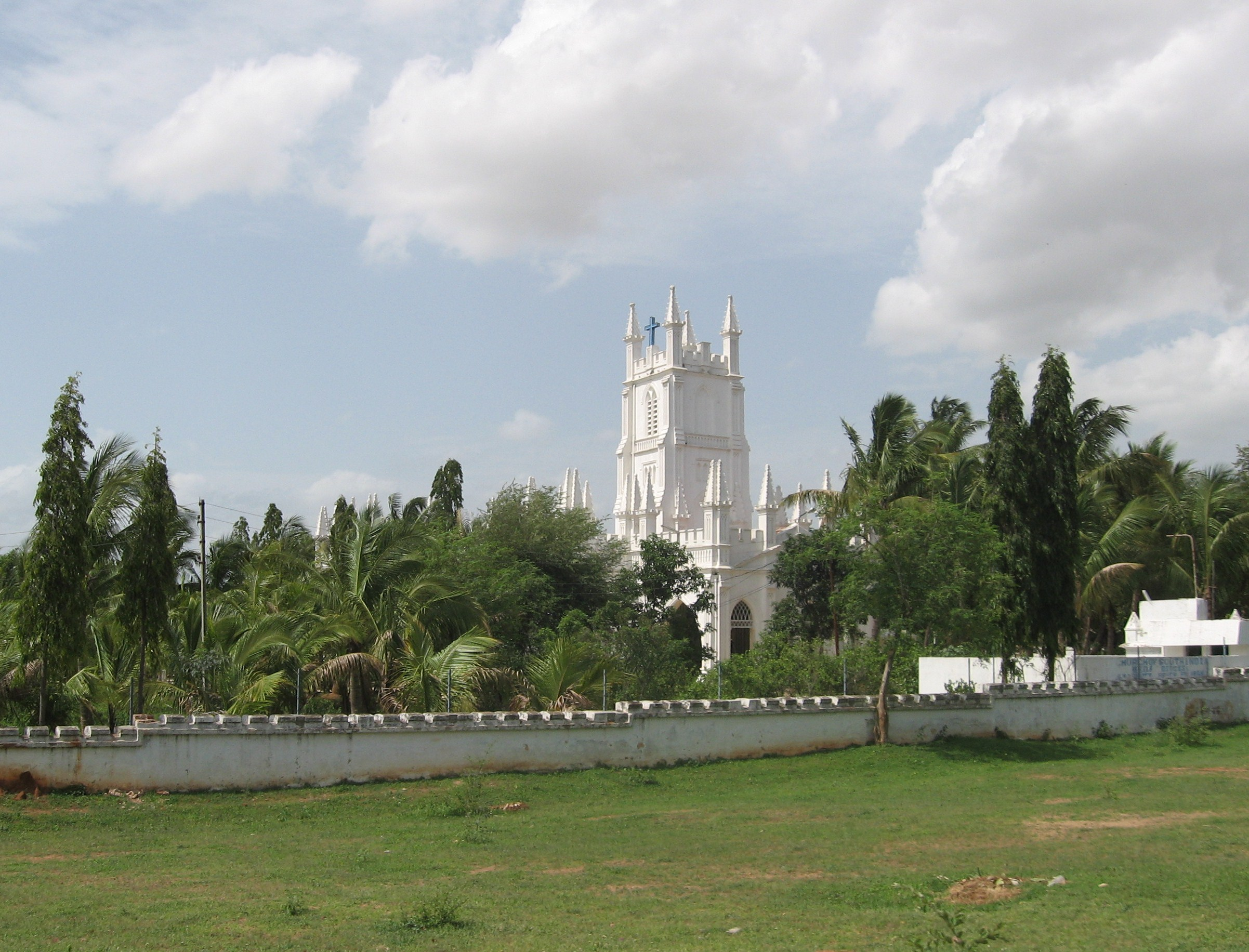
Holy Trinity Church, Bolarum It was commissioned by Queen Victoria of United Kingdom

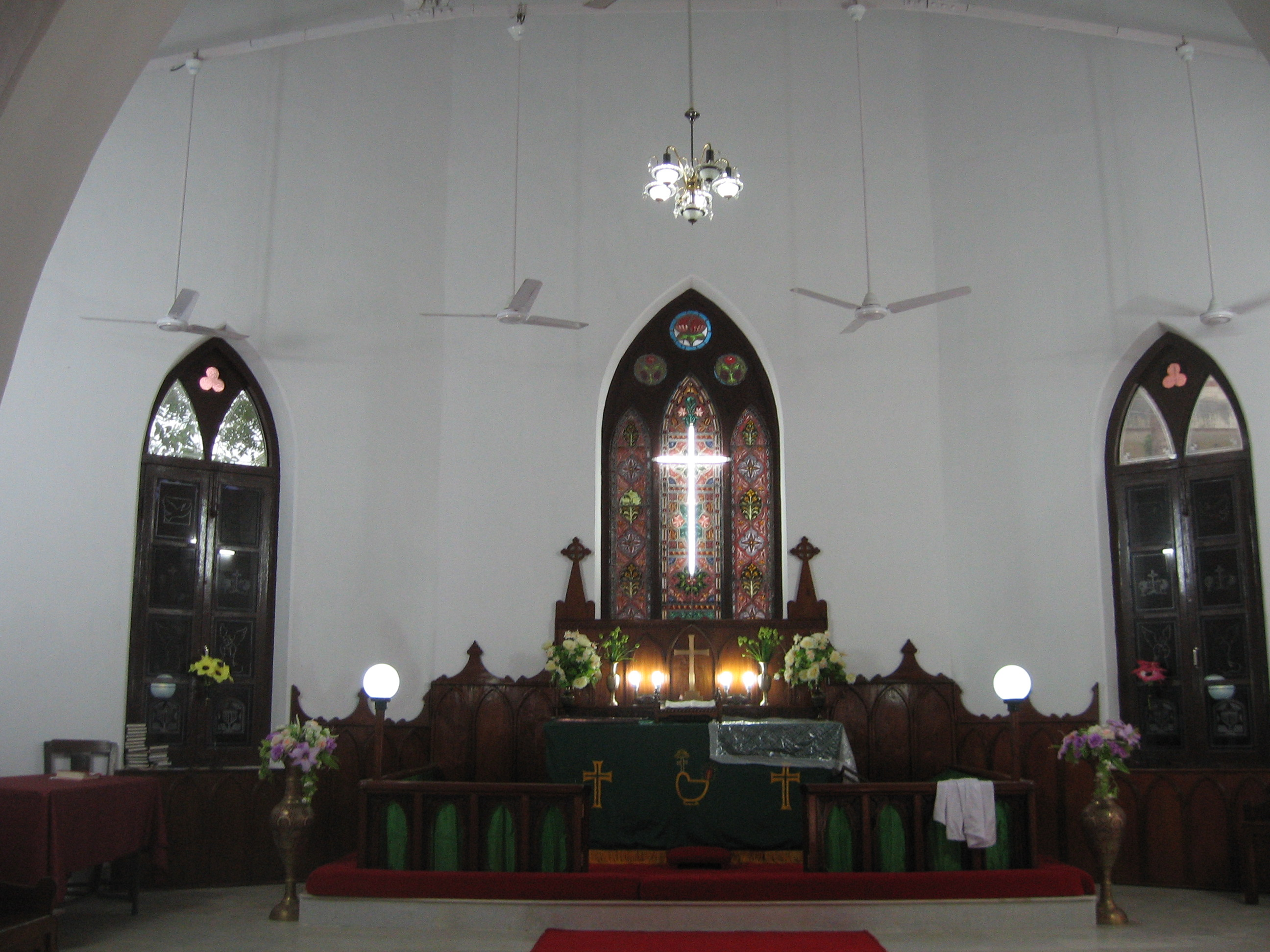
Altar of Christ Lutheran Church, Narsapur

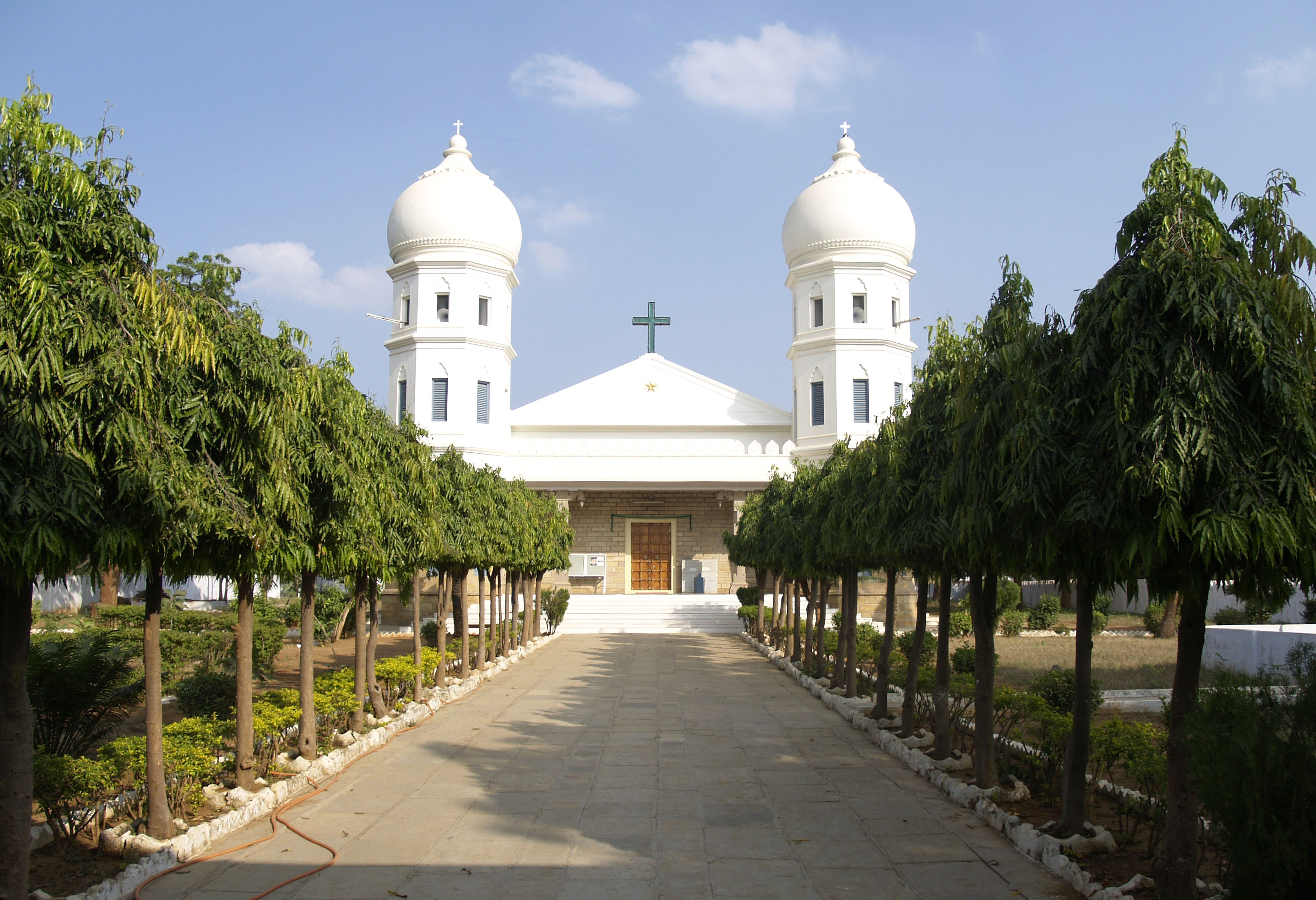
Ephiphany Cathedral, Dornakal Diocese

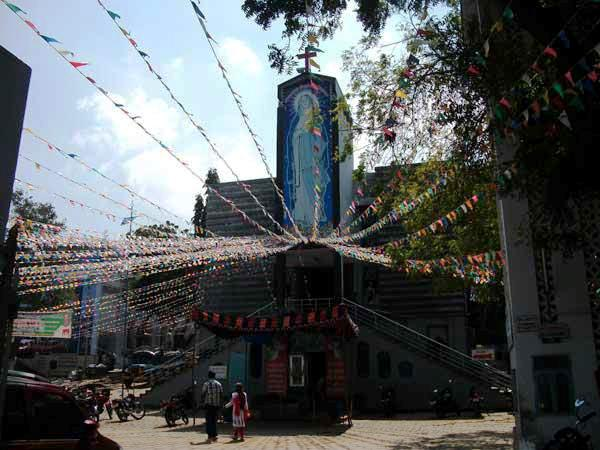
Gunadala Matha Shrine, Diocese of Vijayawada

== Culture ==
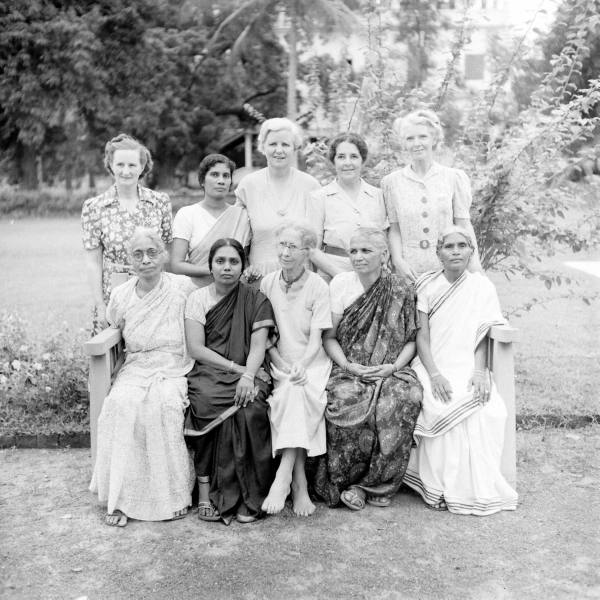
Telugu Christian women photographed with missionary women

The Indo-Christian culture and traditions of Telugu Christians in urban areas can best be described as an increasingly westernised. Telugu Christians today are considered to be one of the most progressive communities in the state. They have one of the highest literacy, work participation and sex ratio figures among the various religious communities in the state.

The mother tongue of Telugu Christians is Telugu, the most widely spoken Dravidian language in India. However, with mission schools being the first to teach using English as the primary medium, English is widely used among Telugu Christian communities for both religious and secular purposes. Most major churches offer religious services in both Telugu and English. Some churches such as St. John's Church, Secunderabad and St. George's Church, Hyderabad offer services exclusively in English. English is also the preferred lingua franca of urban Christian youth.

Mission Compounds and interaction with Christian missionaries played a major role in the development of Telugu Christian Culture. As the result of interaction with missionaries, Telugu Christians were the first people in the region to accept and even adopt Western thought and principles such as the education of the girl child, widow remarriage, and other such reforms. Missionaries such as Ruth Brouwer Crompton identified the factors responsible for shaping the intellectual climate among Telugu Christians: (1) increased leisure (2) higher education; study beyond the level of secondary education. Institutions of higher education include not only colleges and universities but also professional schools in such fields as law, theology, medicine, business, music, and art (3) access to the teaching profession.

Telugu Christian women do not wear the bindi or bottu (red dot on the forehead) and can therefore be easily distinguished from their Hindu counterparts. Culture among Telugu Christian women has been greatly influenced by missionary activity. Both feminine assertion and missionary zeal bound the missionary women with their Telugu sisters. The arrival of single women missionaries in India resulted in a war against the Telugu culture of woman's dependence and male domination. The sight of such missionaries living without any kind of dependence on a man proved to be a subversive culture and "a deviation from rule". Missionary M. L. Orchard called the presence of single women missionaries a "puzzle" to the Hindu society. This "puzzle" fanned the self-confidence of native women to cross their village boundaries on preaching tours, which was unimaginable to the Telugu culture. Many native women became known as Bible women, a label that implied that they had determined to start an independent life and were ready to jeopardise their eligibility to be married because potential in-laws would prefer a girl who had not ventured outside her family's village. Bible women deviated from the cultural propriety and challenged family restrictions. As a result of which, Telugu Christian women were among the first women to work outside the home alongside their husbands. Christian women were the first female teachers in the schools of Andhra Pradesh.

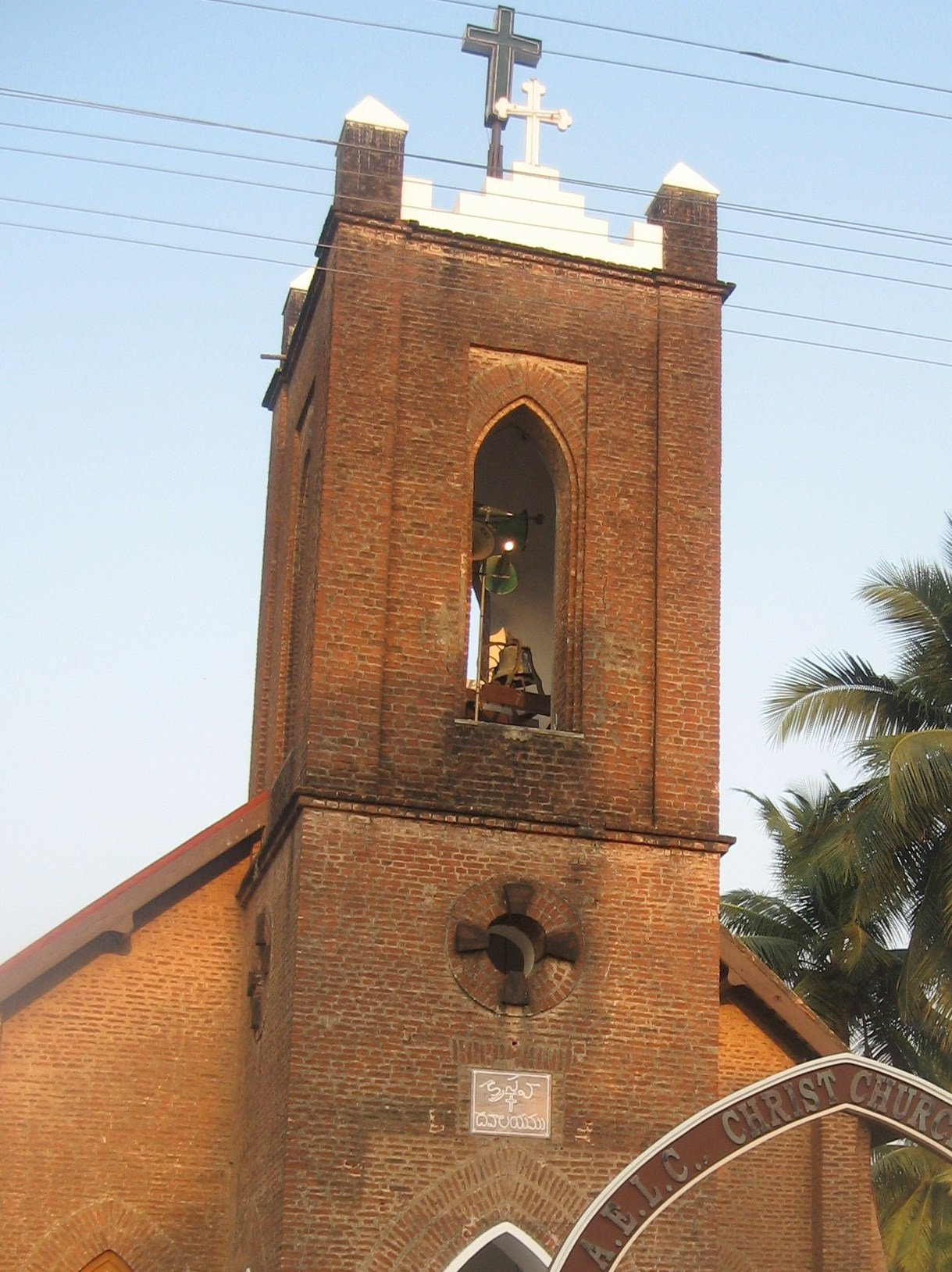
Church bells from belfries such as the one above of the Christ Lutheran Church, Narsapur are still used in rural congregations for tolling the death knell

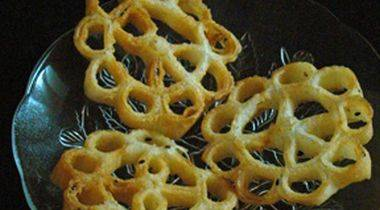
Rose Cookies are a traditional Christmas delicacy in Telugu Christian homes

Religion plays a significant role in the daily life of Telugu Christians. Most life events hold religious significance such as births, baptisms and christenings, confirmations or Nirdharana, marriage (which is referred to as Holy Matrimony or Parishudda Vivahamu), funerals, burials and memorial services. The Protestant Bible is referred to as Parishuda Grandam whereas the Catholic Bible is referred as Pavitra Grandam.

Wedding is referred to as Holy Matrimony or Parishudda Vivahamu which is usually celebrated in a church. It is also common practice among the Telugu Christians to have the marriage solemnised before sunset. This practice is supposed to have its origins in the Biblical verse of I Thessalonians 5:5 which states: For you are all children of the light. Telugu Christian weddings conform to the traditional White Wedding. Traditionally brides wear a white silk wedding Sari. However, women among urban Telugu Christian congregations are increasingly opting for a wedding gown instead of a Sari. A few Hindu traditions have been retained after being Christianised to a great extent. One such tradition is the tying of the wedding Thali. Telugu Christian thalis have a cross inscribed on them. Nalugu, is another ritual that is practised prior to the marriage ceremony. It involves the application of Nalugu a paste of turmeric and other spices to the bride or bridegroom in their respective homes amidst singing of traditional Christian wedding hymns, the most popular ones being Mangalame Yesunaku and Devarini Deevenalu. The publishing of the Banns of marriage on the three Sundays that precede a wedding is another common practice that has its origins in the Church of England.

The practice of Infant Baptism is becoming less significant among Telugu Protestants being replaced by Child dedication or christening. It is however indispensable among the Telugu Catholics given the Catholic belief in the saving grace of baptism. Adult baptisms are often by means of immersion as opposed to the alternative methods of aspersion and affusion. Even traditional denominations such as the Church of South India and the Methodists have instituted baptism by immersion in recent years. Confirmation, the practice of bestowing full membership in a church on children is practised by some denominations.

The death knell or the tolling of the church bell is a popular practice among rural congregations. It is often a means of letting the community know of the demise of a church member. Memorial service is another important event among Telugu Christian communities. It is usually celebrated in close proximity after a person's death. The service includes eulogising the deceased, scripture reading, singing of hymns, sermon followed by a dinner.

Christmas is the most important festival. One festivity that is a distinctive part of Christmas celebrations among Telugu Christians is the singing of carols late in the night. Groups of carolers from churches sing carols outside Christian homes usually late in the night. They are then welcomed into the house and are treated to Christmas delicacies. It is also a common practice to collect offering for the church during this time. Rose cookies, plum cake, muruku are some of the popular Christmas delicacies. Easter is another important festival. Sunrise services held at dawn and hilltop services are characteristic to Easter Sunday celebrations among Telugu Christian congregations. Lutheran Christians in coastal districts visits cemeteries on Easter morning. All Souls' Day is another festival that is celebrated by Christians in the cities of Hyderabad and Secunderabad.

== Names ==
The most common naming convention among Telugu Christians is the combination of the Telugu surname with an English or Biblical first name. Most Telugu Christians have English first names owing to the influence of British and American missionaries. Bilingual names are also common with the first name being an English name and the middle name usually being the Telugu translation of Christian virtues. An example of a Bilingual name is Lily Nirikshana where Lily is a common English name and Nirikshana is the Telugu translation of hope. There are also inter-generational differences with respect to naming conventions. Telugu Christian names were more quintessentially British among older generations. The most common masculine first names among older Telugu Christians were names such as George, Edward, and Charles. The most common feminine first names among older Telugu Christians being Victoria, Daisy, and Mary. Telugu translations of Christian or Theological virtues such as Krupa, Vyduryam, or Deevena were also more common among older Telugu Christian women. Current naming trends have shifted towards more Biblical names such as John, Daniel, or Rachel. However, bilingual names such as Mary Sucharitha or Victor Premasagar are still commonplace among younger generations. Catholic names can also be easily distinguished from Protestant names as Catholic children as usually named after Patron saints. Until recent times, Telugu Christians along with other Telugu people followed the convention of family names preceding first names. This is no longer the norm.

== Music ==
The music of Telugu Christians consists mostly of hymns. The Andhra Kraistava Keerthanalu (Andhra Christian Hymnal) is the single most important collection of hymns used in Telugu Christian congregations. It includes translations of English Hymns and original hymns written in Telugu by famous hymnists such as Purushottam Chaudhary, John Bethala and the likes. Most of these Telugu Christian songs are set to the ragaas used in the Indian classical music. However the most popular hymn among Telugu Christians is James McGranahan's There Shall be Showers of Blessing and its Telugu translation Asheervadhambulu Mameedha. Hymns are used for all occasions forming a major part of Telugu Christian culture. The most popular wedding hymns are Mangalame Yesunaku and Devarini Deevenalu. Other famous hymns include Deva Samsthruthi, Nadipinchu Nananva, Thanuvu Nadhidhigogai. While the pipe organ alongside the Tabla was traditionally used as an accompaniment in congregational worship, its use today is limited as many have fallen into disrepair.

== Institutions and organizations ==
Notable institutions and organizations run by the Christian church in Andhra Pradesh include:

- Andhra Christian College
- Andhra Christian Theological College
- Andhra Loyola College
- Baptist Theological Seminary
- Eva Rose York Bible Training and Technical School for Women
- Little Flower Junior College
- Loyola Academy, Secunderabad
- Rosary Convent High School
- Saint Ann's High School
- Saint Patrick's High School, Secunderabad
- St. John's Regional Seminary
- St. John's Regional Seminary (Philosophate)
- Stanley Girls High School
- Sacred Heart High School, Mothkur

== Diaspora ==
Telugu Christians can today be found in various countries. Telugu Christian Associations can be found in all major cities in the United States of America. These expatriate communities strive hard to keep the distinctive Telugu Christian culture alive. Many Telugu Christians have emigrated to other countries in the English-speaking world with significant populations being present in the United States, United Kingdom, Canada and Australia.

=== Notable Telugu Christians ===
- Anthony Poola, Catholic Archbishop of Hyderabad.
- Noel Sean, rapper, singer and composer.
- Johnny Lever, actor.
- Victor Premasagar, bishop.
- Jayasudha, actress.
- Y. S. Jaganmohan Reddy, former Chief Minister of Andhra Pradesh from 2019 to 2024.
- Y. S. Rajasekhara Reddy, former Chief Minister of Andhra Pradesh from 2004 to 2009.
- K. A. Paul, evangelist & politician.
- Jimmy Moses Indian actor and playback singer.
- Jamie Lever Indian actress and comedian.
- Y. S. Sharmila, politician.
- Anup Rubens, musical composer and singer.
- Gurram Jashuva, Telugu poet.
- Paul Valthaty, former Indian cricketer.
- Danny Pudi, Indian-American actor

== See also ==
- Reddy Catholics
- List of churches in Secunderabad and Hyderabad
- Church of South India
- Christianity in Tamil Nadu
- Secunderabad
- Lutheran Churches in Andhra Pradesh
