= Puroshottam Choudhary =

Indian writer

Purushottama Choudhary
- Born: September 5, 1803; Madanpur, Ganjam district
- Died: August 24, 1890 (aged 86)
- Occupations: Christian poet, preacher
- Parent(s): Kurmanatha, Subhadra

Puroshottam Choudhary (5 September 1803 – 24 August 1890) also spelled Purushottama Chaudhary or Purushothama Choudhari was a great 19th century Telugu Christian poet. He was a Christian preacher, evangelist, and pastor of the Berhampur Church, founded by Isaac Stubbins in 1838.

He was also a poet, pamphleteer, and one of the first Christian vaggeyakaras (composers) - contributing immensely to "Bhakti tradition" in Telugu Christianity and to Christology in India.

== Biography ==
Choudhary was born on 5 September 1803 to Bengali parents Kurmanatha Chowdhari and Subhadhra at Madanpur in Ganjam district, Orissa - with predominant Oriya and Telugu-speaking people and their neighbouring lands – Ganjam district is located on the border of Telugu-speaking districts of present-day Andhra Pradesh - namely, Chicacole (present Srikakulam) and Vizagapatam (present Visakhapatnam). While in Orissa, he was married to his cousin, Radhamani Devi. They had two sons and three daughters.

Purushottam Choudhary came from an orthodox Bengal Brahmin family, whose ancestors migrated to present Andhra-Orissa (Odisha) region in the 1700s because of political unrest in Bengal state in those days.

By 1825, it appears, he was introduced to Christian literature, when his brother Jagannadha Chowdhari procured him religious tracts written by probably by William Carey, one of the Serampore Trio. Influenced by the tracts, he obtained more tracts from neighbouring villages and decided to learn more about Christianity. He even went to Vizagapatnam (also known as Vizag) and met Roman Catholic priest and tried to meet Rev James Dawson of London Missionary Society, already operating over there. Later he was influenced by Christian officers like Capt. Knott, General Adjutant Evalin, and Major Brett from East India Company - While working as a tutor in Parlakimedi. He was directed to Helen Knott, who gave Gospel of Luke and two tracts. In May 1833, he went to Vizagapatnam to meet missionaries, then-overseen by Major Brett. Here, he had written his own tract on Indian caste in Telugu, published later by Tract society of Madras, while, Brett had plans to send him to Madras by sea, Helen Knott having got positive message from Baptist Missionary Society from Cuttack, he was finally sent to Cuttack. Eventually, he was baptised on 6 October 1833 into Christian faith by Charles Lacey, an English General Baptist missionary to Cuttack, Orissa; Charles Lacey came to Orissa in 1823 for evangelical activities, after William Bampton and James Peggs arrived Orissa in 1822.

Initially in 1834, he worked as an assistant missionary under Major Brett of London Missionary Society at Madras; accordingly, he made numerous trips to Oriya speaking districts and Telugu speaking districts of then-Madras Presidency, including regions of Andhra and Bellary of present Karnataka, to preach the "Word of God,"(gospel) and to distribute Christian literature, including the evangelical literature written by him. After he was baptised, while in Vizagapatnam, he preached gospel over there, and surrounding villages. About this time, he wrote his first lyric I sought the refuge of our Jesus Christ. Though his relatives and villagers outcast him for renouncing his native faith, he kept on preaching gospel in Vizagapatnam, Chicacole, Madras, Bellary, including his native place near Parlakimedi and surrounding villages.

Soon his wife joined him at Chicacole, and was ordained on 24 April 1835 by the Baptist missionaries at the Baptist conference in Cuttack under supervision of Amos Sutton, impressed by his sincere work in the ministry; later, he was sent to work exclusively among Telugu people as an assistant to Samuel S. Day, a Canadian-born American Baptist missionary to Telugus in Srikakulum, Visakhapatnam, Bellary, Nellore, and most of Madras Presidency provinces; and founder of Telugu Baptist mission at Nellore. After he worked as an evangelist for a while, he was appointed as pastor at the Church in Berhampur, also known as Silk City, in Ganjam district.

In 1836, his wife Radhamani became a Christian. The same year he was invited by the judge at Chicacole to preach gospel there. He worked closely with Rev William Dawson of London Missionary Society (an accomplished hymn writer in Telugu). In 1838, he was invited to Berhampore, where he spent seven years by preaching and touring all Ganjam district neighbourhoods. In 1844, he went to Chicacole station under London Missionary Society and preached gospel there for another six years till 1850. In 1851, after he lost his wife, he was transferred again to Vizagapatnam; over there, he helped the missionaries in Bible translation and continued his gospel preaching. In 1861, he toured several Telugu-speaking areas for gospel preaching, namely, Anakapalli, Yellamanchili, Tuni, Pithapur, Samalkot, Peddapuram, Cocanada (present Kakinada), and several other Andhra regions. In 1862, he was recruited to preach evangelistic work at Chittivasala, near Bimlipatnam, and on Sunday evenings to preach at Polepalli. During these course, several of his family members were baptised.

In 1868, having decided to retire from mission work, he went back to Cuttack where his children lived. After he returned to Cuttack, by 1870 he had warm friendship with Das Anthravady, a pastor. He and Anthravady baptised several people and preached the gospel visiting Chicacole, Vizianagaram, and Chittivalasa. In 1872, Anthravady published a poetical work by Purushottam entitled The Gospel Trumpet - one thousand copies were printed and distributed in Telugu speaking districts. In 1875, he was again offered his former pastor job by mission and finally made him in charge of the Church at Berhampore.

He was also a good poet and renowned hymn-writer; he composed one hundred and thirty hymns, authored books, seven Christian tracts, and published many pamphlets with teachings of Jesus Christ. Having lost vision of both eyes after fifty-four years of preaching with London Mission and English Baptist mission, he lived a remaining life on pension from Church. He died at an age of eighty-seven on 24 August 1890, and was buried in Cuttack.

A biographical account of him entitled Rev. Purushottam Chowdhari was authored by John Chowdhari, his grandson. Another book entitled Bhakti Theology of Purushottam Choudari was authored by Joseph Ravela, professor of Andhra Christian Theological College (ACTC).

== Works ==
- Nilachala Vilasamu, a poem written while a heathen - not yet baptised, 1828.
- Kulachara Pariksha (Examination of caste), a tract, 1833.
- Muktimarga Pradarsanam (The way of happiness), a tract, 1845.
- Yesu Kristu Prabhu Satakamu (Ode to the Lord Jesus), a poem, 1845.
- Jagannadha Pariksha (Testing of Jagannath), in Telugu, 1845.
- Muktimarga Pradarsanamu (The way of happiness), a tract, 1845.
- Rakshana Charitra (History of salvation), 1846.
- Nistara Ratnakaramu (Jewel mine of salvation), 1846.
- Vigraha nirmanamu (The creating of an Idol), 1847.
- Pancha Chamara Pannamulu, 1847.
- Pancha Ratnamulu (Five jewels), poems about God, 1847.
- Brahma Jnanamu (on Pantheism), 1856.
- Andhakara Nasanamu, in Telugu, 1861.
- Masuchi, Visuchi, Sankata bhranti nivritti (The destruction of the fear of disease), 1862.
- Manasse Mulam (The mind is everything), 1863.
- Kristava Niti Prakasamu (the gospel trumpet) written in 1851, a booklet in Telugu, published by Das Anthravedy in 1871.
- Satyaveda sara sangrahamu or Christ's paratatva (Christian philosophy), 1871.
- Hymns for public and private workshop, in Telugu metre (1883)
- Devuni Viradrupa Varnanamu (Description of the grandeur of God), in Telugu, 1884.
- Life of Purushottam Chowdhari, 1888.

=== Works he assisted ===
- In compilation of Telugu Baptist hymn book.
- Assisted W. Dawson (L.W. Society) on Telugu hymn book, containing about 80 of Purushottam's hymns, 1848.
- Assisted in compiling hymns about 130.
- Assisted J. Hay on Telugu scriptures.
- Index to the Telugu Bible, a laborious production of Purushottam.

== See also ==
- Telugu Christian
