= Orissa Baptist Evangelistic Crusade =

Christian denomination in India

Orissa Baptist Evangelistic Crusade (OBEC) is a Baptist Christian denomination in the state of Odisha in Eastern India. It is affiliated to the Baptist World Alliance. Its headquarters is in Bhubaneswar.

== History ==
On 7 February 1822, William Bampton and James Peggs of the General Baptist Missionary Society of England reached Orissa at the Pattamundai Coast and preached in Berhampur. The first baptism, of Shri Eron Senapoti, took place in Berhampur on 25 December 1827. The first ordination of the Oriya preachers Gangadhar Sarangi and Ramchandra Jee Jachuck took place in 1835.

In 1867 the Indian Auxiliary Mission was formed and continued until 1899. After this, the Indian Baptist Missionary Society was formed and continued till 1909, after which that society continued under another name, Utkal Christian Church Union, until 1933, when it changed its name again not as a Union but as part of a Central Council. Later the Orissa Baptist Evangelistic Crusade took over the evangelical responsibility of Orissa Baptists since 1969 independently.

According to a census published by the association in 2023, it claimed 3,842 members and 34 churches.

== See also ==
- Christianity in Odisha
- Christianity in India
