= Amos Sutton =

General Baptist missionary to Odisha, India

Amos Sutton (1802 in Sevenoaks in Kent – 17 August 1854 in Cuttack, Odisha) was an English General Baptist missionary to Odisha, India, and hymn writer. He published the first English grammar of the Odia language (1831), a History (1839), and Geography (1840), then the first dictionary of Odia (1841–43), as well as a translation of the Bible (1842–45). He also composed a hymn to the tune of "Auld Lang Syne": "Hail, sweetest, dearest tie, that binds" and wrote a History of the mission to Orissa: the site of the temple of Juggernaut (1835).

== Biography ==
At the age of 21, he was recruited by General Baptist Foreign Missionary Society for missionary service. He was trained for the ministry under J.G. Pike, founder of the Connexion's Missionary Society in Derby. After a brief period in home ministry, he was sent as a missionary to India in 1824 by Baptist Missionary Society, two years after William Bampton and James Peggs, the first two Baptist missionaries, had entered Odisha. Sutton along with his wife, Charlotte Sutton née Collins, sailed to Calcutta (now Kolkata) and joined the missionary work at station Cuttack in modern-day Odisha on 11 March 1825. Soon after their arrival to his mission station, his first wife Charlotte died in Puri due to sickness. He later married Elizabeth Coleman, an American Baptist missionary widow.

=== Missionary work ===
The missionary began the evangelism and recorded the first Odia conversion in 1828. By 1841, Sutton had trained three Odia evangelists at Cuttack. By 1846, when the students increased to eight, he formalised the class as the Cuttack Mission Academy. By 1805, the Baptist missionary society and later Amos Sutton under the auspices of Serampore Trio — William Carey, Joshua Marshman, and William Ward—attempted to preach to Telugu-speaking people in the northernmost parts of present Andhra Pradesh — adjoining areas of Odisha such as Chicacole (present Srikakulam) and Vizagapatnam (present Vizag or Visakhapatnam). Baptist missionary attempts and Amos Sutton's objective to evangelize Telugus failed and the missionaries didn't venture to the Telugu regions again, confining themselves to Odia-speaking districts.

As the Baptist Missionary Society was not able to support the Odisha missionary work, through his second wife he was able to get contact details of the American Free Will Baptists. Sutton contacted the Free Will Baptists Mission mentioning the great needs of Odisha and adjoining Telugu-speaking areas; accordingly, he received an invitation from the convention to visit America.

Sutton and his wife visited England and the United States and spent two years between 1833 and 1835 sharing their mission fields. During their visit to United States, he spoke at the seventh General conference of the Free Will Baptists in October 1833 before an audience of 3,000 people inspiring them to devote their life to the missionary service. At this conference, Jeremiah Phillips and Eli Noyes came forward to offer their service to Odia-speaking people.

While visiting his relatives in the United States in 1835, he urged the Baptist convention in Virginia to take over the abandoned work among the Telugus; accordingly, Samuel S. Day, a Canadian-born American Baptist missionary, and E. L. Abbot, including their wives were sent by American Baptist Foreign Mission Board to the Telugu-speaking provinces along with Sutton.

On 22 September 1835, Amos Sutton, Jeremiah Phillips, Eli Noyes, Samuel S. Day, including their wives and several other missionaries sailed to India. After 136 days of sailing, they arrived Calcutta. From Calcutta, they travelled by land and joined their respective mission stations – E. L. Abbot departed to Burma, while the Day family proceeded to the Telugu-speaking provinces and arrived at Vizagapatnam – Amos Sutton, Eli Noyes, and Jeremiah Phillips proceeded to the Odia-speaking provinces and arrived at Cuttack where the British Baptist Missionaries were already working – Jeremiah Phillips and Eli Noyes dedicated their missionary service to Santals. Amos Sutton soon became the corresponding secretary of the new Free Will Baptist Missionary.

== Bibliography ==
Sutton devoted himself to learning the local Odia language, as soon as he arrived the mission station. Sutton being a gifted translator, soon compiled an Odia grammar, and dictionary in three volumes, as well as translating a number of English books such as Pilgrim's Progress by John Bunyan – in Odia named Swaga Jatrira Britanta – and also a complete translation of the Bible. Amos Sutton's Introductory Grammar of Oriya language published in 1831, happens to be the oldest publication available in the Oriya Language Collection to date.

He published the first volume of his Odia dictionary in 1841, and the next two volumes by 1843. It was printed in the Odisha mission press at Cuttack. The Odia dictionary gives Odia meaning of Odia words with English synonyms. Sutton also prepared a dictionary named Sadhu Bhasharthabhidhan, a vocabulary of current Sanskrit terms with Odia definitions which was also printed in Odisha mission press in 1844.

He published Dharmapustakara Adibhaya between 1842 and 1843. He also published the History of the Mission To Orissa: The Site of the Temple of Juggernaut in 1835. In addition to Odia tracts, he published A Narrative of the Mission to Orissa in 1844, Orissa and its Evangelization in 1850, an autobiography, the Happy Transformation in 1844, and compiled Padarthavidyasara to be taught as textbook in the schools of Odisha.

As a hymn writer, he prepared the first Odia hymn book—179 of the hymns being of his own composition. He composed hymns, especially for divine worship, public, private, and social occasions. Amos Sutton's hymns appear to have been the first Protestant hymnal printed in India. On his visit to England in 1833, he composed a farewell hymn to the tune of Auld Lang Syne – "Hail sweetest, dearest tie, that binds". This soon became very popular and is still in common use.

== Awards ==
- A degree of D.D. was conferred on him by the College of Waterville, USA.

== See also ==
- The British missionary societies
- Pyarimohan Acharya
