= Lyman Jewett =

American Baptist missionary (1813–1897)

- Born: March 9, 1813; Waterford, Maine, U.S.
- Died: January 7, 1897 (aged 84); Fitchburg, Massachusetts, U.S.
- Education: Brown University (BA); Andover Newton Theological School (DD)

Lyman Jewett (March 9, 1813 – January 7, 1897) was an American Baptist missionary known for translating the Bible into Telugu.

== Background ==
Born in Waterford, Maine, Jewett studied at Worcester Academy and Brown University before earning his Doctor of Divinity from the Newton Theological Institution. He sailed with his wife for India in October 1848 and reached Nellore in April 1849. The founder of the Telugu Mission in Ongole was Samuel S. Day. After Samuel S. Day, Jewett was the central figure of the Mission along with John E. Clough. The results of the mission were meagre and the home organisation repeatedly pressed for its closure. Jewett and his wife were home, sick, in America in 1862 when one such attempt was made to stop funding for the mission. He learned Telugu from a Brahmin convert.

Jewett died in Fitchburg, Massachusetts.

== See also ==
- Telugu Christian
- Bible translations into Telugu
