= Pyarimohan Acharya =

Historian and editor from Odisha, India (1851–1881)

Pyarimohan Acharya was a 19th-century historian, educationist, and public intellectual from Cuttack in the modern-day state of Odisha, India. He is known for his Odisara Itihasa (History of Odisha) which was published in 1879. Pyarimohan wrote his history in response to an advertisement by the colonial government of the time looking for a textbook for use in schools. While the book was accepted by the government, its publication caused a controversy and was consequently not inducted into the school syllabus. Odisara Itihasa nevertheless acquired prominence as it was the first history textbook to be written by a native author. Apart from writing he also established P.M Academy School in 1875 in cuttack. It was one of the oldest school in odisha.

== See also ==
- Amos Sutton
