= John Christian Frederick Heyer =

American minister and missionary

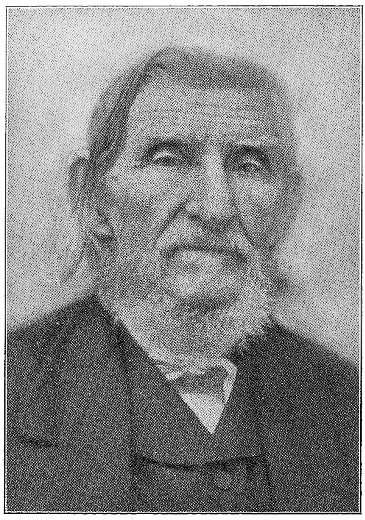
- The Rev. John Christian Frederick Heyer, M.D.
- Born: July 10, 1793; Helmstedt, Electorate of Saxony
- Died: November 7, 1873 (aged 80)
- Burial place: Friedens Lutheran Church cemetery, Friedens, Pennsylvania
- Education: University of Göttingen; University of Maryland
- Occupations: Pastor, missionary, medical doctor
- Years active: 1816–1873
- Spouse: Mary (Webb) Gash
- Religion: Lutheran
- Ordained: 1820

John Christian Frederick Heyer (July 10, 1793 – November 7, 1873) was the first missionary sent abroad by Lutherans in the United States. He founded the Guntur Mission in Andhra Pradesh, India. "Father Heyer" is commemorated as a missionary in the Calendar of Saints of the Evangelical Lutheran Church in America on November 7, along with Bartholomaeus Ziegenbalg and Ludwig Ingwer Nommensen.

== Early life and education ==
Johann Christian Friedrick Heyer was born in Helmstedt, Electorate of Saxony, (now Lower Saxony, Germany), the son of Johann Heinrich Gottlieb Heyer, a prosperous furrier in Helmstedt, and wife, Fredericke Sophie Johane Wagener. After being confirmed at St. Stephen's Church in Helmstedt, in 1807, his parent sent him away from Napoleonic Europe to reside in America with a maternal uncle (Wagener), who was a furrier and hatter in Philadelphia, Pennsylvania, specializing in the popular beaver hat.

C. F. Heyer, as he is often referred to, studied theology in Philadelphia studied under J. H. C. Helmuth and F. D. Schaeffer. He traveled back to Germany in 1815 and studied theology with his brother, Henry, at the University of Göttingen. He obtained his M.D. from the University of Maryland School of Medicine in 1847. (He did not attend Johns Hopkins University, as is sometimes claimed.)

== Marriage and children ==
In 1819, he married Mary (Webb) Gash, a widow with two children, Caroline Gash (born about 1809) and Basil Gash (born about 1813). To this couple, six more children were born:

- Sophia M. Heyer (born January 7, 1818, in Philadelphia, Pennsylvania; died 18 Nov. 1875 in Shelby, Richland County, Ohio). She married George Washington Houpt.
- Carl Henry Heyer (born December 5, 1820, Cumberland County, Pennsylvania)
- Mary Ann Heyer (born April 13, 1822, Cumberland County, Pennsylvania; died October 1823 of malaria)
- Henriette Heyer (born December 17, 1823, in Somerset County, Pennsylvania) married 1) George Snyder and married 2) George Steyer.
- Julia Eliza Heyer (born September 25, 1825, and died 1 January 1826 in Friedens, Somerset County, Pennsylvania)
- Theophilus Heyer (born November 30, 1827, in Friedens, Somerset County, Pennsylvania)

== Career ==
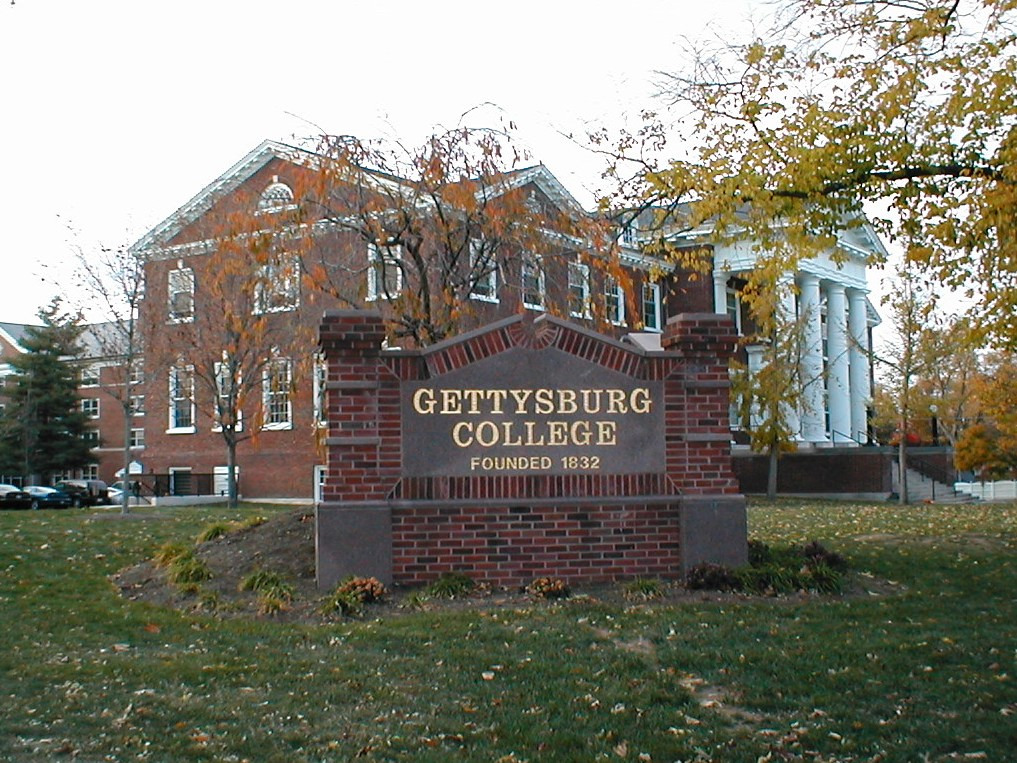
Gettysburg College

He was a teacher at Zion School, Southwark, Philadelphia from September 1813 to March 1815, when he returned to Germany for a visit. After his return to the United States in 1816, he was licensed as a lay preacher. Heyer worked as a preacher for three years until he was fully ordained in 1820. He spent the next twenty years ministering and establishing churches and Sunday schools in Pennsylvania, Maryland, New York, the mid-western states, and as far west as Missouri.

From October 1829 to November 1831, he served as agent of "The Sunday School Union of the Evangelical Lutheran Church in the United States". In this capacity he traveled more than 3,000 miles (4,800 km), visiting some 300 congregations and distributing Sunday School hymnals and tracts, and assisting pastors to establish Sunday Schools.

In 1829, he used his private funds, along with twenty two other stockholders (all Lutheran clergymen), to purchase the former Adams County Academy and form the Gettysburg Gymnasium. The institution became Gettysburg College in 1832, at which time Heyer and his associates, through their private subscriptions, became the Patrons of Pennsylvania College at Gettysburg. Heyer was also elected to the first Board of Trustees, and was an occasional instructor at the Gymnasium.

He was the first pastor of the First Evangelical Lutheran Church in Pittsburgh, established in 1837, which was the earliest English-speaking Lutheran congregation west of the Allegheny Mountains. He organized The First German Evangelical-Lutheran Congregation of Pittsburgh, a German-speaking congregation, one week later, on January 22, 1837.

=== Missionary ===
During his wide travels, his wife and children remained in Friedens, Somerset County, Pennsylvania. After his wife Mary's death in 1839, Heyer was asked to enter the foreign missions, and began preparing for this calling in 1840. Heyer was commissioned in 1841 by the Ministerium of Pennsylvania as the first foreign missionary of the American Lutheran churches. After studying Sanskrit and medicine in Baltimore, he set sail for India from Boston in 1841 with three other missionary couples on the ship Brenda under Captain Ward.

Returning to the United States in 1845, he continued his missionary work and established St. John's Church in Baltimore. At the same time, he studied medicine, and obtained his M.D. from the University of Maryland School of Medicine in 1847.

He traveled to India a second time in 1847, spending a decade, mainly in the Guntur district of Andhra Pradesh state, in southern India, where he ministered and performed yeoman service to the people there. Supported initially by the Pennsylvania Ministerium, and later by the Foreign Mission Board of the General Synod, Heyer was also encouraged and assisted by British government officials. He established a number of hospitals and a network of schools throughout the Guntur region. The mission's educational work continued with later missionaries including Amy Sadtler Albrecht, who taught at the Hindu Girls' School in Guntur from 1892 to 1919.

== Later travels ==
For health reasons, he returned to the United States in 1857, and spent the next decade organizing churches, particularly in the new state of Minnesota. He traveled to Germany in 1867–1868. In 1869, at the age of 77, he made his third trip to India to reorganize the Rajahmundry mission.

Heyer returned to the United States in 1871. In January 1872, he was appointed chaplain and the first " house father" of the Lutheran Theological Seminary at Philadelphia. Despite his brief time among the students, he was much respected and loved by the faculty and students.

He died in 1873 at the age of eighty, and his body was buried beside his wife in the Friedens Lutheran Church cemetery, Friedens, Pennsylvania. His estate contained roughly $7,000, $500 of which he devoted to paying for his final expenses, a grave stone, and erecting an iron fence around his and his wife's graves. He left $2,500 to his children and grandchildren, with the condition that his grandchildren remain members of the Lutheran Church and abstain from alcohol and tobacco, and bequeathed the remaining $4,000 to the Somerset Lutheran congregation, the Lutheran Theological Seminary at Philadelphia, the Pennsylvania Ministerium for foreign mission work in India, and to the Passavant orphanages in Zelienople and Germantown, Pennsylvania.

== Legacies ==
In 1880, when a missionary society was organized by the students at the Lutheran Theological Seminary at Mount Airy, they named it the Father Heyer Missionary Society.

The missionary field that Heyer founded in Guntur in 1842—together with the Rajahmundry Mission that was founded by the Rev. Luis P. Manno Valett of the North German Missionary Society in 1845—grew to become the Andhra Evangelical Lutheran Church (AELC), organized in 1927. By 2009, the congregational membership of the AELC grew to become one of the largest Lutheran churches in India, and the third largest Lutheran church in Asia, boasting a membership of about 2.5 million individuals in about 5,000 parishes. According to the President of the AELC, "The strong edifice built by the missionaries for the growth of education is still being continued by AELC. It also concentrates on diaconal works such as Establishment of Hospitals, Emancipation of Women's Status, Rural Development Projects and Mother & Child Health Programme."

C. F. Heyer's name also is commemorated by the Father Heyer Junior College and vocational schools in Deenapur and Phirangipuram, Andhra Pradesh, India.

== See also ==
- Lutheran Churches in Andhra Pradesh
