= James Liddell Phillips =

Medical and religious missionary

James Liddell Phillips (1840–1895) was a medical and religious missionary. Born in Balasore, India, Phillips always considered himself an "Indian boy." His father, Jeremiah Phillips, was also a medical and religious missionary whose work inspired James. After his teen and young adult years, which he spent in America, he returned to India as a missionary, where he worked intensively with many tribes in Bengal, India, especially the Santal tribes. He held medical clinics and sermons, ran a newspaper, founded the Bible School in Midnapore, and started many Sunday schools, to name a few of his accomplishments. Phillips died on June 25, 1895, in Mussoorie, India. The last thing he wrote in his journal before his death was “May God bless the Sunday School message to the young!”

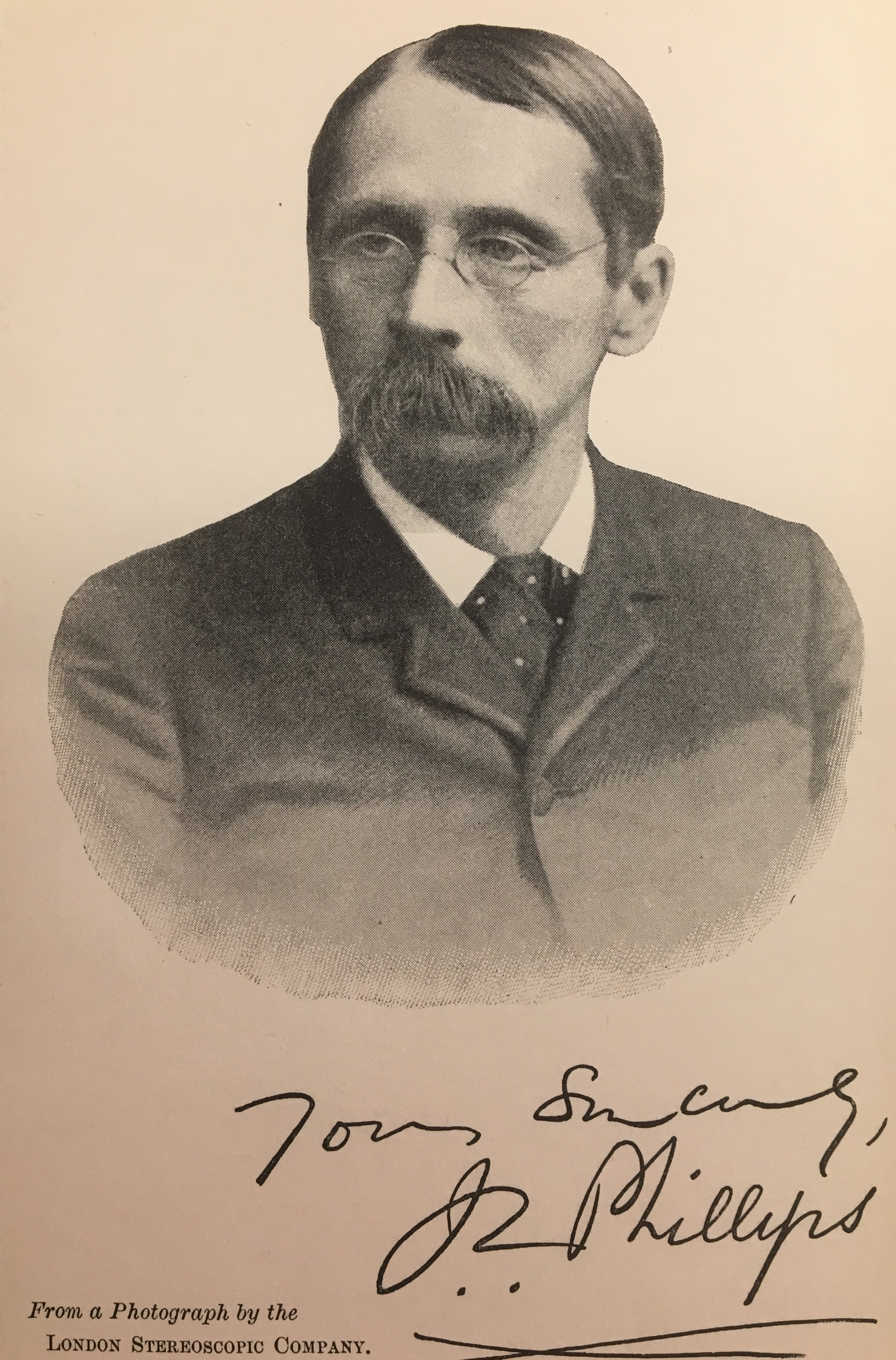
James Liddell Phillips

== Early life ==
=== Childhood ===
Being the child of Jeremiah Phillips, a prominent religious missionary, James and his siblings were all very religious people, and James was taught from a young age to donate money to religious purposes whenever he made money.

During his adolescence, James’ father sent him and his twin brother to America to escape the cholera outbreak in India and to receive a better education than what they could have received in India. During his early years in America, he became less religious. He had a belief that, if he were to be fully devout to Christianity in America, he would feel the need to return to India and become a missionary, like his father, rather than explore other options.

Progressively, he became an even stronger supporter of Christianity, leading to him giving his own sermons. After his graduation from Bowdoin College, he did some work as a Pastor in a church in New York, then some more work in medicine and surgery to prepare for missionary work. He was accepted as a missionary by the Foreign Board in 1863. He married Mary R. Sales in 1864 and embarked on his missionary journey later that year.

=== Education ===
James L. Phillips received all of his schooling in America before he returned to India as a missionary. As an adolescent, he attended Whitestown Seminary in New York. Phillips then went on to attend college at Bowdoin College, which he graduated from in 1860.

By 1864, Phillips obtained his MD from the College of Physicians and Surgeons in New York, and was eventually bestowed a Divinity of Doctor (DD) degree from Bowdoin College in 1878 as “recognition of his distinguished missionary career." By the time he was 38 years old, Phillips had received an M.A., LL.B., and M.D., as well as a D.D.

== Life as a missionary ==
=== The call and journey ===
After becoming a doctor and being accepted as a missionary by the Foreign Board, Phillips moved back to India to extend his knowledge of medicine and religion to the people living there. Not only did he believe it to be his duty as a follower of Christ to help people that were suffering, but he was also content with the work. As he wrote in his journal, “The present appears happy only when doing my Master’s will, and the future looks hopeful only as fully dedicated to faithful and zealous labour for my Lord.”

"I told the Lord that I would go anywhere or do anything if He would save me. From that night, I began to think of India’s needs and children, and gave myself up to India’s God and to them." -James L. Phillips

=== Service ===
In India, specifically in Midnapore, Phillips traveled to visit many different jungle tribes, holding clinics, spreading religious services, and ameliorating the state of the villages. The two services he provided-medical and religious-had a tendency to overlap. Often, when providing medical services, he directed patients to the “Great Physician” for “diseases of the soul.” Through this process, he converted many Indians to Christianity.

He continued this work for 11 years, before a short period of return to America in 1875. After his return to India in 1878, Phillips held his normal medical clinics and also opened the Bible School at Midnapore in 1879, working as its principal for 7 years.

After another break from India, Phillips returned in 1891, where he began to offer classes at Union Chapel, Calcutta for students studying International Sunday School Lessons there. These classes were attended by the teachers of Sunday Schools. For two years, Phillips traveled throughout India for the sake of work for the Sunday School Union. He aided in starting up new Sunday Schools and compiling Sunday School Unions in different villages and, by 1891, he had successfully launched the India Sunday School Journal.

In 1893, Phillips left India to go on tours in other countries, raising awareness for the Sunday School mission and recruiting new missionaries. When he returned to India, he continued his tours throughout the country with the Sunday School mission until the end of 1894. He continued his missionary work until he physically could not anymore, before dying in 1895.

=== Return to America ===
Phillips' first return to America was in 1875. His return was ultimately based on his deteriorating health condition, for which he needed to receive medical services in America. During this three-year break from his missionary work, Phillips was anything but idle. He provided his medical and religious services in America, as well as made plans for the future of his work in India. His next big idea was to build a Bible School in India. Once this idea was approved, he proceeded to go on “lecturing tours” throughout America to raise funds and recruit missionaries for this cause.

In 1885, Phillips once again went back to America due to his wife's deteriorating health. Upon his return, he decided to extend his services, especially religious services, to America. Almost immediately after his return, he was invited to be a pastor of a church in Auburn, Rhode Island. After working in this position for a while, he became the chaplain of the State Institution of Rhode Island, where he aided in prison reform. He was later invited to Philadelphia to be the secretary of the Evangelical Alliance. All the while he was extending his services in America, he was still fundraising for Indian children and Sunday Schools in India. The recognition of his efforts led to his becoming the secretary of the India Sunday School Union.

== Legacy ==
Throughout his 33 years of missionary work in India, Phillips is most remembered through his physical establishments and his dedication.

“[James'] life was one of self-sacrifice and devotion so deep and full and rich, that to his dying day he never had a thought that he was doing anything nobler than the simple duty which the created owe to the Creator.”

=== The Bible School at Midnapore ===
The Bible School in Midnapore was opened in May 1879. The first year of its opening was a preparatory year for the teachers to get ready for students. Students, who were typically potential missionaries, started attending the Bible School in 1880. During winter months, students would do religious missionary work: preaching and spreading God's message. For the rest of the school year, they would attend classes.

James L. Phillips was the principal of the Bible School for a total of seven years, but even in this position, he continued his own missionary work. The Bible School in Midnapore proved to be very successful and garnered a lot of attendees, who then went on to spread their learnings of Christianity to others in the area.

=== The Sunday School Mission ===
By the end of Phillips’ many tours and efforts for the Sunday School, the total number of Sunday Schools in India grew to well over 5,548, with over 197,754 attendees. Phillips also helped publish and wrote for the Indian Sunday School Journal, of which he was the editor, for many years, even when he was on his tours.
