= Polepalli =

- village
- Location in Telangana, India
- Coordinates: 17.298611°N 80.119167°E
- Country: India
- State: Telangana
- Headquarters: Khammam

Languages
  - Official: Telugu
- Time zone: UTC+5:30 (IST)
- Vehicle registration: TS

Polepalli is a village in Khammam district in Telangana, India. Polepalli is approximately 10 km north of Khammam. It has an average elevation of 107 metres (351 feet)
