= James Peggs =

Christian missionary in India

James Peggs (January 7, 1793 to January 5, 1850) was the first missionary to be sent out by the English General Baptists Missionary Society in 1821. Peggs and William Bampton served in Cuttack, Orissa (present Odisha) in India.

Peggs was an English Baptist missionary and pamphleteer active in British India who played an influential role in the spread of Christianity on the subcontinent. Along with fellow General Baptist William Bampton, Peggs spent the majority of his career in India, preaching in Cuttack, Orissa to evangelize the local population. In his pamphlets, Peggs publicised the practise of Sati- then widespread in Bengal to gather support for further evangelical missionary work among the "pagan" Indian public. Peggs also circulated the Pilgrim tax levied on Idolaters going on pilgrimages.

== Biography ==
James Peggs, a student of G.B. Academy at Wisbeach, offered himself to the General Baptist Missionary Society, for missionary service in 1820. With delay in prior designed plans to travel India for missionary service along with William Ward, one of the Serampore Trio, he moved to London in 1820 and obtained acquaintance with British system of education along with Mrs. Bampton, while Bampton studied medicine. He was ordained on 15 May 1821 at Loughborough along with Bampton, attended by William Ward too in the service, and sailed to India on 29 May 1821 along with Ward, Bampton, fellow-missionary, and their wives.

== Missionary work ==
Peggs, Bampton, and their wives reached Serampore on 15 November 1821 via Madras (present Chennai). They embarked at Calcutta (present Kolkata) and arrived at mission station at Cuttack on 12 February 1822. With restrictions on missionary work removed in India in 1813, the first batch of Baptist missionaries arrived in Orissa on 12 February 1822. Prior to, departing Calcutta, they received religious tracts, thousands of copies of gospel, epistles, and considerable copies of the sacred writings for distribution among the natives as part of evangelism. These are printed at Serampore mission printing press, under the guidance of Serampore Trio.

Peggs, soon after arrival at the mission station at Cuttack made an excursion to the surrounding areas of Cuttack for a few days to become acquainted with area. While travelling, they distributed books, tracts and scriptures. He made journeys to the surrounding areas of Cuttack along with fellow missionaries to establish four village schools, within a vicinity of 50 miles of the mission station. They initially endeavoured to establish schools under the charge of heathen masters, until Christian teachers could be obtained through conversion or baptism.

On 1 June 1822, he and Bampton started a vernacular school at Cuttack to impart elementary knowledge of Christian theology through the medium of native Odia language. Between June 1822 and December 1833, fifteen such schools were established by General Baptists Missionary Society, out of which three were in close proximity to Cuttack mission station. By 1844, four village schools were established by Peggs and Charles Lacey around Cuttack. In October 1823, the first Anglo-Indian vernacular school was opened by the Baptist mission at Cuttack.

In a letter to a friend on 5 October 1822, Peggs writes as:

On the first of this month we commenced the practice of assembling the children of our native schools monthly at each other's bungalow. You would have been much gratified to see between fifty and sixty children in Brother B's[Bampton] verandah, undergoing their examinations by ourselves, our dear partners, and our servant Abraham, who now studies and speaks Oriya. But i must inform you we had considerable difficulty in dissipating the fear of both parents and children, for some rumours were in circulation that we should take the children to Calcutta, and make Christians of them, give them victuals, or in some way take away their caste. Judge then our agreeable surprise, when despairing of the children coming this morning, and consulting the best means of treating their prejudices of the people, we were told some boys were come, and when in few minutes most of the children from the three schools, with their masters, appeared.

Initially, William Bampton and Peggs worked at Cuttack mission station; later, in 1823, Bampton and his wife left to Puri to start a new mission station over there, while Peggs and his wife continued to work at Cuttack. Later, Peggs along with fellow missionaries like Charles Lacey made several visits to Puri station where Bampton was working for evangelism activities.

He went back to England on 18 May 1825 due to sickness, but continued to speak on behalf of the East India Company and Missionaries, the need to evangelize the Oriya-speaking people, on raising their standard of living and bringing them out of superstitions and blind beliefs. After he left Cuttack, Charles Lacey took over his activities at the mission station and kept himself in constant touch with Peggs passing over the day-to-day affairs.

=== Evangelism ===
On June 24, 1806, Claudius Buchanan, Vice-Provost of the College of Fort William, having visited Oriya speaking tracts, dreamt and foresaw to turn the entire land of Oriya-speaking districts into Christ land; accordingly, after returning to England, he influenced the public opinion in favour of organised missionary activity in Orissa. East India Company brought all the tracts of Oriya districts under its control by 1822. Around the same time, William Bampton and James Peggs were sent to Orissa with the specific purpose of spreading Christianity among the Oriyas. Prior to that, by 1813, the British parliament through legislation, had allowed the missionaries to undertake educational activity in Company territory. As a result, the missionary societies formed in Britain sent their representatives to various parts of India—after William Bampton in 1822, Charles Lacey came to Orissa in 1823, Amos Sutton in 1825, and Nois and Jeremiah Phillips in 1835.

The evangelical movement in Britain, by the end of 1700, argued that one's commitment to Christ should be reflected in action, primarily to proselytize or seek converts among heathen and abolish slavery in the British Empire. Initially, English East India Company had prohibited Christian missionaries from living within their territories and seeking Indian converts in order to prevent unrest or opposition to the Company's trade and political control. In 1813, when the British parliament was considering the renewal of the charter that authorized Company's trade and political control in India, Members of Parliament who were evangelical Christians, especially Methodists and Baptists, induced [forced] the Company to permit missionaries to settle in their territory. Once in India, Protestant missionaries [denominations and groups], namely, General Baptists Mission Society; American Free Will Baptists; Particular Baptist Missionary Society; Evangelical Missionary Society; and German Evangelical Lutheran Missionaries; and alike, criticized native religious practices such as idolatry, and social customs such as early marriage and sati, especially in Bengal and Orissa, as superstitious and barbaric.

The first activities of the missionary, like starting a chapel at Cuttack, evoked little response and appreciation from the Hindus. Among the important contributions of the Christian missionaries in Orissa was the spread of modern education. The missionaries, in fact, laid the foundation and were the pioneers of present modern education in Orissa. Missionaries considered education "as auxiliary to preaching" [sic]. Their aim was to evangelize the entire country and they believed that by the spread of education, superstitions, beliefs, blind faiths, and idolatry could be erased from the native mind and thereof the circulation of sacred scriptures would be feasible. The missionaries saw education as a tool for the gradual destruction of Hinduism and its replacement with the Christian religion.

Missionaries like Peggs were sent to Orissa to undertake educational activity in East India Company territory and also to spread Christianity among the Odias. As part of evangelism and conversion of Odia people, he and William Bampton distributed a thousand copies of Gospel translated into the Odia language who gather at the annual gathering of Juggernaut car-festival in 1823. He published several pamphlets on the miseries of Sati, Pilgrim Tax, Ghaut Murder, Infanticide, and Slavery.

Peggs, lately returned from Orissa, attended the Annual Meeting of the Baptist Missionary Society, held at Great Queen Street Chapel, on 22 June to give the following appalling view at Juggernaut:

Having been stationed about 50 miles from Juggernauth's Temple, and having, in connection with my Brethen, established a Missionary station about a mile from it, and been myself at Juggernauth at two of their great Annual Festivals, it seems proper for me to say something of the scenes which are exhibited; and to give you my own testimony, and that of my Brethen, who, as well as myself, have been eye and ear witnesses to the abominations of that dreadful place. The psalmist declares that their sorrows shall be multiplied that hasten after another God; and nowhere on earth, perhaps, is this so fully exemplified as at Juggernauth.
At the last Annual Festival, from extreme indisposition i was able to be there only on the last day; but i will read to you a few particulars respecting it, given by my companions, Mr. and Mrs. Lacey. Mr. Lacey says -- This year Jhatra commenced unusually early; In consequence of which it may be presuemed, the number of Jhatrees was unusually great; expecting, no doubt, to escape the rains. The Gentleman who keeps the gate(a native of Norway, in the employ of our Government), and who, in consequence, will be allowed to be the best judge of numbers, told me that not less than 225,000 pilgrims entered the town. The greater part of this immense were women; and, among these, many seemed poor and very old; being turned out by their inhuman children, they came to end a life of wretchedness near their favourite idol, from dying near which they had been taught to expect heaven.
This number of pilgrims raised a sum of money scarcely ever realized before - 32,500. Thus, while the pilgrimage destroys thousands of live, some reap considerable advantage. You would have felt your heart moved to hear, as I did, the Natives say - "Your preaching is a lie: for, if your Saviour and Religion are thus merciful, how do you then take away the money of the poor, and suffer them to starve!" I often had to do with objections like these; however, I endeavoured as well as I could, to clear the character of Him who died for the poor and the sinner.
I think, from the number of the poor, that many must have perished without the gate; and also think so from the great number of bodies beyond.
A gentleman arrived at Cuttack, who addressed a Letter to us, requesting our aid in the distribution of some money which he was authorised to give. We accepted the proposal; and Mr. Bampton and myself set out from Pooree, furnished with rupees, clothes, medicines, and books, and intended to spend two days on the road. We did so; but i cannot particularize what we saw - scenes the most distressing - dead, dying, and sick. They had crept into the villages, into the sheds, and under the trees, to avoid the rain; and thence many were removed. The dead principally lay in the water, whence the materials from raising the road were taken; they were drifted by the wind to the next obstruction where they lay in heaps of from eight to twenty together. For the first two coss from Pooree, i counted about three hundred dead; and i must necessarily have overlooked many; having to observe both sides of the road. I saw one poor creature partly eaten, though alive; the crows had made an incision in the back, and were pulling at this wound when i came up; the poor creature, feeling the torment, moved his head and shoulders for a moment; the birds flew up; but immediately returned, and recommenced their meal.
On the first and second days we had some rain, and the three following days the rain descended without intermision; till the poor pilgrims were to be seen, in every direction, dead and in the agonies of death - lying by fives, tens, and twenties; and, in some parts, there were hundreds to be seen in one place. Mr. Lacey counted upward of ninety; and, in another place, Mr. Bampton counted a hundred and forty; the former i saw myself, though i left it to Mr. Lacey to count them. I shall avoid seeing so degrading and shocking a scene again. In the Hospital, i believe i have seen thirty dead at once, and numbers more in the agonies of death; and even living using the dead bodies for pillows!

While in England, having returned from Orissa, James Peggs published the book India’s Cries to British Humanity, Relative to Infanticide, British Connection with Idolatry, Ghau Murders, Suttee, Slavery, and Colonization in India in 1832, when British parliament was reviewing the charter of the Company. He also sought to induce Parliament to give firm instructions to the Company to exert greater control over Hindu social customs and religious practices that he considered evil and barbaric. Peggs also claimed that "self-immolation" continued among Hindu widows, and that the Company must take more vigorous measures to enforce the prohibition of sati. The image (Burning a Hindoo widow), the first page of Pegg's compendium of sources and commentary on "Suttees" [Sati] in India’s Cries to British Humanity, Relative to Infanticide, British Connection with Idolatry, Ghau Murders, Suttee, Slavery, and Colonization in India, was frequently reproduced again and again as ritual of sati, to influence Britons and whereby British parliament to garner support for enforcing prohibition of sati as a ladder for extending Charter extension for Company's reign and also Missionaries Translational activism.

==== Translational activism ====
Missionary translation was divided into two categories: one, secular texts - translated texts of Indian literature, textbooks for school curricula, government regulations and circulars; two, religious texts - translations of English and Bengali tracts, Christian literary allegories, and the translation of gospel and Bible. James Peggs initially, Amos Sutton and others later, started their education mission by writing secular texts such as dictionaries and grammars - the volume of writing was so large that it necessitated a separate printing press at Cuttack in 1837; however, prior to Cuttack printing press, translation activities were performed and published from Serampore Mission press. Missionaries were installed by East India Company as mediators between Company administrators and native Oriyas. Over the period, missionaries instead of becoming a mediator between two languages and cultures, assumed and become an instrument of hegemony between the State and Church; partly, because of using incompetent translators, lack of adequate training, or using Bengali as intermediary language for translation into Odia language - finally, under the guise of Secular texts and School textbooks, the missionaries were able to spread their sphere of activism - to the extent of using them as the tools of warfare against the ignorants and native heathens, including success in conversion of heathens to some extent -, undermining the Company administration's secular character.

==== Ministry in England ====
Peggs held ministerial posts at Borne, Ilkeston (1841-1846) and Burton on Trent before his death in March 1850.

== Works ==
- Suttees' Cry to Britain (1828).
- The Present state of East India slavery, chiefly derived from the Parliamentary Papers on the subject (1828)
- India’s Cries to British Humanity, Relative to Infanticide, British Connection with Idolatry, Ghau Murders, Suttee, Slavery, and Colonization in India (1832)
- Capital Punishment: The importance of its abolition
- A Voice from the Tombs (1840)
- History of the General Baptist Mission (1846)
- Orissa: Its Geography, Statistics, History, Religion and Antiquities.(1846)
- A brief Sketch of the Rise and Progress of Cuttack (1854)
- A voice from India

== See also ==
- The British missionary societies
- Evangelical Missionary Alliance
- Evangelical Church in Germany
- Christian literature
