= Jeremiah Phillips =

American Baptist missionary

Jeremiah Phillips (1812–1879) was an American Baptist missionary to the Santals under the Free Baptist Missionary Society in India.

He is credited for opening up the first educational facility for the Santals and a farming colony for the Christian Santals at Jellasore, Odisha(formerly Orissa). He also reduced the language of Santals to writing and introduced a written system of clerical administration and missionary work among Santal tribals—laying the foundation of the Bengal–Orissa Baptist Mission among the Bengali people, Odia people, and Santals.

== Biography ==
He was born to Parley Phillips and Hannah (Crumb) Phillips on 5 January 1812 at Plainfield, New York, US. He graduated from Hamilton Literary & Theological Institution - later changed its name to Colgate University. While at the university, Amos Sutton from the English General Baptist mission in India visited America and addressed the students of the university and several other schools inspiring Phillips and others to devote their life to missionary service. He was among the first appointees of the Free Will Baptist Foreign Mission Society, organised in 1832 in Maine, USA, for sending missionaries to India at the invitation of the General Baptist missionaries from England, working already in Orissa; accordingly, he was ordained in 1835 as a Minister and missionary to India. He married Mary Spaulding Beede, his first wife, on 15 September 1835. At the age of twenty-three, he sailed along with his colleague Eli Noyes [he left India after four years], Amos Sutton, their wives, and several other missionaries [fifteen] arrived Calcutta in 1836 as missionaries under the Free Baptist missionary society in India. He and Eli Noyes were moved from Calcutta and stationed at Majurbhanj, Orissa, where the Baptists from England had already started their work among the Odia. While at the station Sambalpur, his first wife died on 3 November 1837. Sambalpur station was given up in 1828, moved to Balasore station, and later to Jellasore station in 1840. In 1839, he married Mary Ann[e] Grimsditch, second wife from Serampore, but she fell sick and died of fever in August 1940 at Midnapore - now in West Bengal state. Mary Ann Grimsditch bore two twin sons: James and John.

He married Hannah M. Cummings, third wife and daughter of Thomas Cummings and Hannah Webster, on 12 February 1841—Hannah Cummings arrived in India on 12 September 1840 and was appointed as a missionary to India at the age of 20 - they had ten children, where eight of them were born at Jellasore, Orissa. He along with his wife served at Cuttack, Sambalpur, Balasore, Jellasore, and later at Midnapore.

He came to India as a missionary to the Santals— aboriginal tribes predominant in Orissa, West Bengal, Assam, Bihar, and Jharkhand. He devised a writing system for the Santal language using the Bengali script, and translated parts of Gospel of Matthew into Santali in that script. He opened up the first educational facility for the Santals in Jellasore in 1845, established a farming colony of Christian Santals in 1852, and whereby instrumental in introducing written systems over the local vernaculars - essential for clerical administration and missionary activities. He published An Introduction to the Santal Language in 1852, and translated parts of the Bible into the Santali language. He also produced a grammar and dictionary that combined with schools ultimately resulted in village transformation.

He returned to the United States in 1855 due to ill-health, and settled on a farm in Midwest - USA. He came back to India in 1865 and opened a teachers training school in 1866. He went back to the United States in 1879 after almost 44 years in India and died on 9 December 1879. In 1911, the merger of Free Will Baptists with the Northern Baptists brought the oversight of the mission to the American Baptist Foreign Mission Society.

== Works ==
- The Sántáls.
- (Santal) Gospel of Matthew
- (Santal) Gospel of John.
- An introduction to the Sántál language.
- A Santali Primer.
