= Christ Lutheran Church, Narsapur =

Church in India

Coordinates: 16.438°N 81.696°E

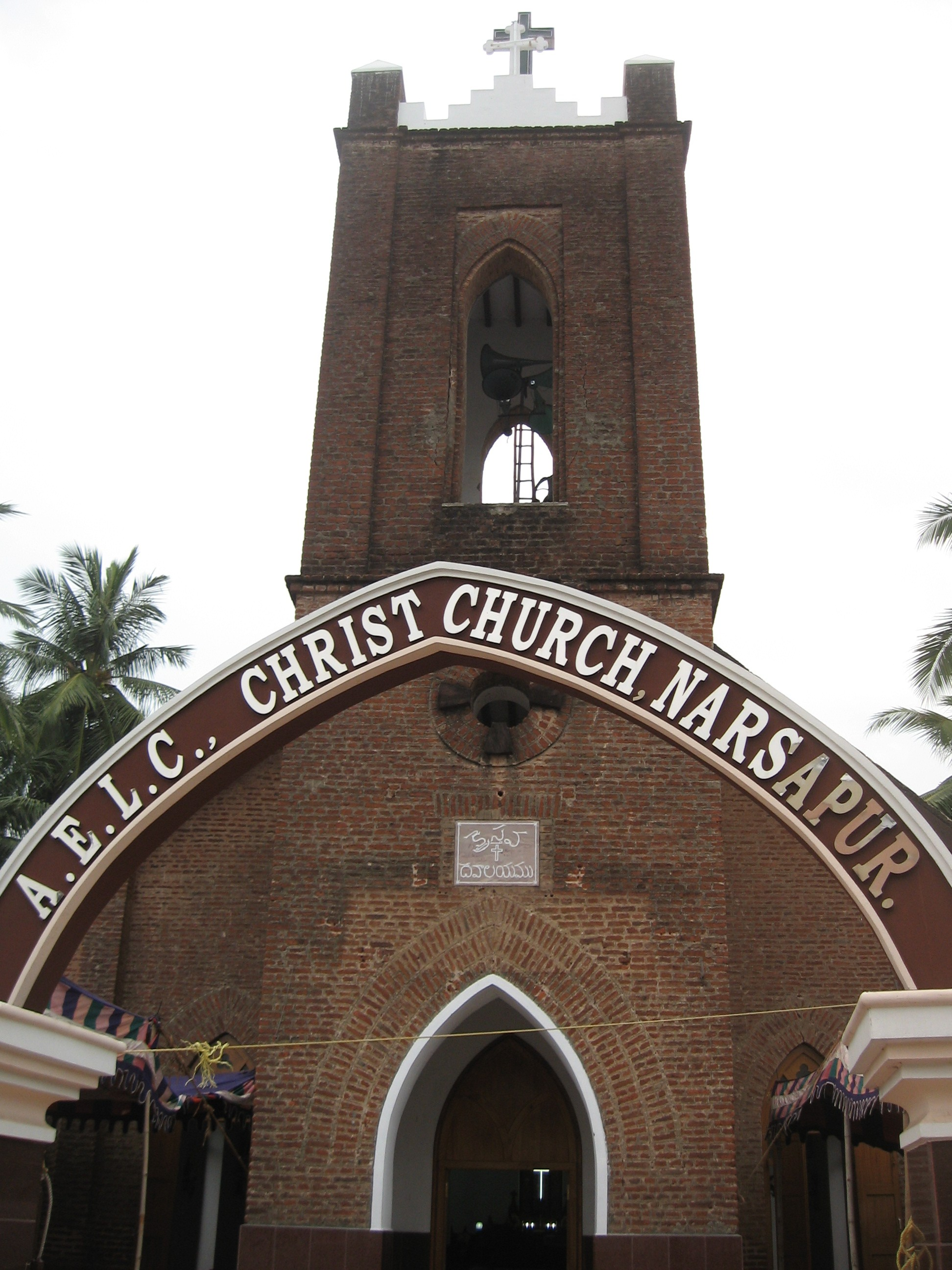
Christ Lutheran Church, Narsapur, built 1929

Christ Lutheran Church is a congregation in the Andhra Evangelical Lutheran Church and is a member church of the West Godavari Synod. It is an A class parish and is a mother church to several smaller and younger congregations in and around Narsapur, West Godavari. Its pastors are pastor V. Rajendra Sundar and Assistant pastor P.P.S.kiran. The church follows Lutheran traditions.

== History ==
The cornerstone was laid in 1923 by Friars Barger and Heyer. The Church was started in 1929. The church register records events since 1929.

The church celebrated its platinum jubilee for which the church underwent major renovations. New pews and chandeliers were installed.

== Architecture ==
The church is a landmark brick structure. It followed the gothic architectural style. The bell tower houses a bell with an excellent tone. The bell was manufactured in Watervliet, New York by the Meneely Bell Foundry and was reported to have been "one of the finest church bells ever shipped" from the foundry. The church features stained glass for an altarpiece.

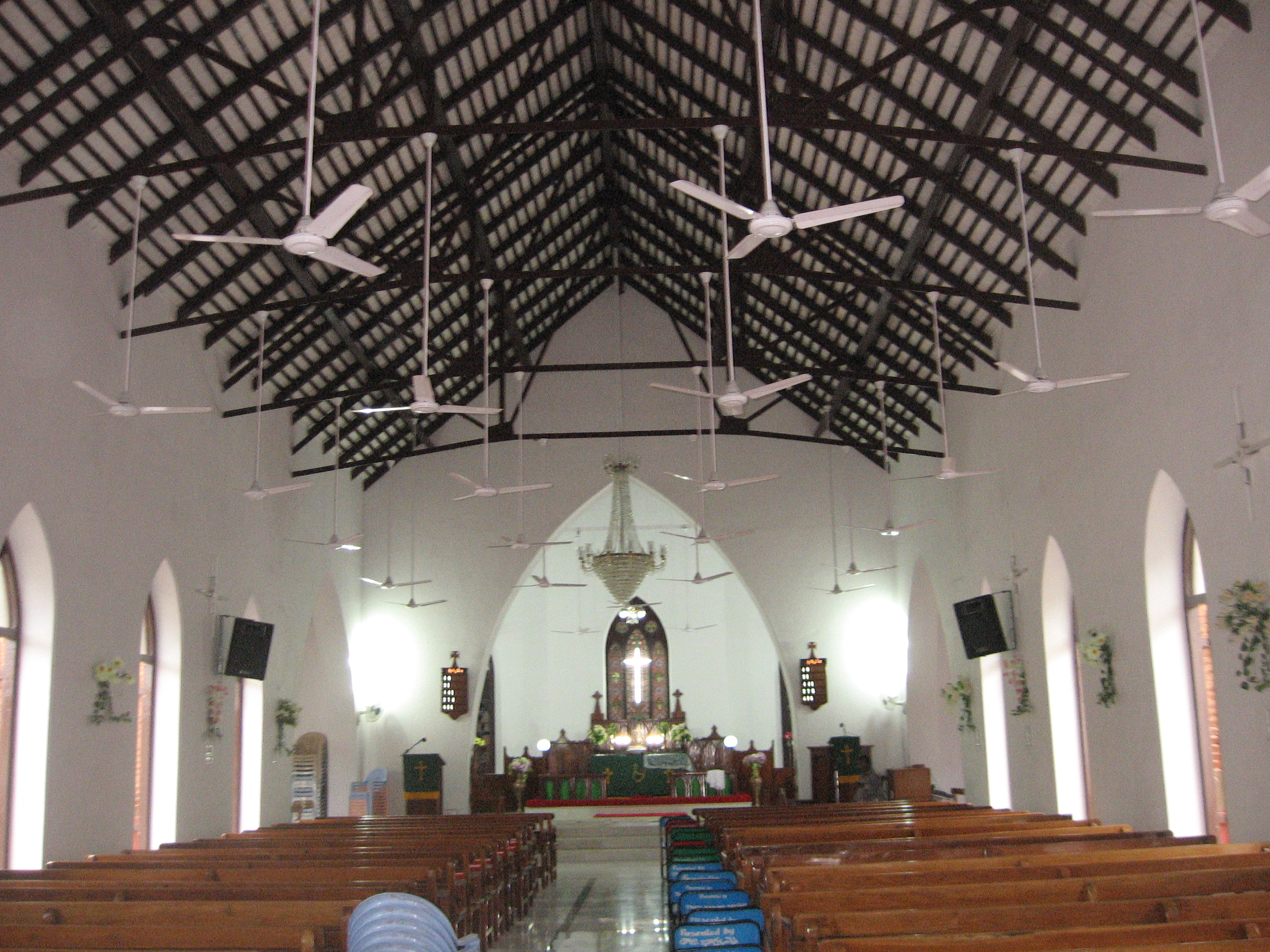
Christ Lutheran Church, Nave view

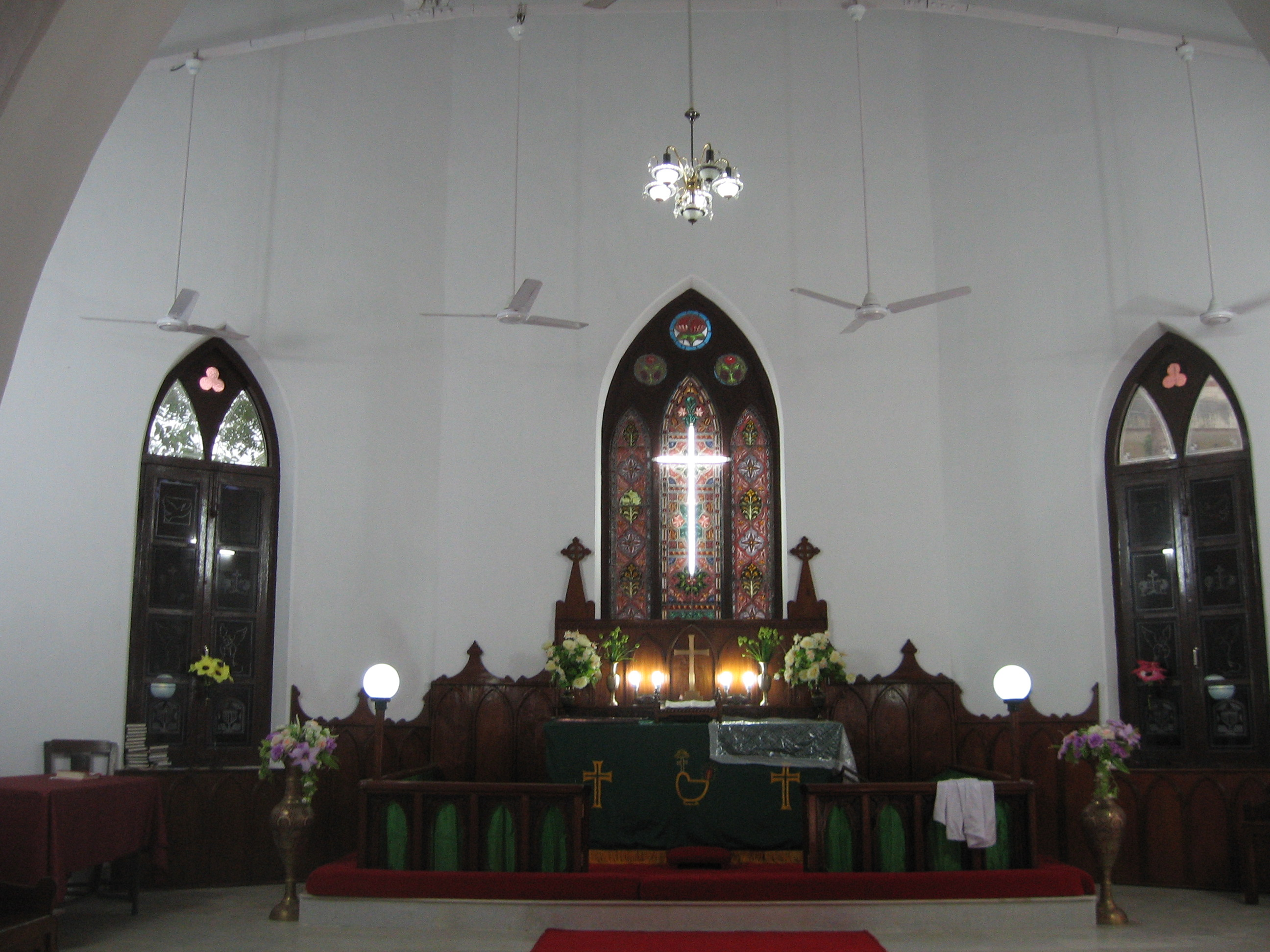
Christ Lutheran Church, Altar view
