= Lutheran Churches in Andhra Pradesh =

Lutheranism was introduced into Andhra Pradesh, one of the southern states of India, in the year 1842 by a Pennsylvanian missionary of German origin, the Rev. John Christian Frederick Heyer, M. D., who was commonly called Father Heyer. It was all built by the British and other Europeans during post-independence period.

== Church bodies ==
There are 13 Lutheran church bodies in Andhra Pradesh:

- Andhra Evangelical Lutheran Church (AELC)
- Association of Free Lutheran Churches (AFLC)
- Bharat Evangelical Lutheran Church (BELC)
- Bible Faith Evangelical Lutheran Church (BFLC)
- Christ Evangelical Lutheran Church (CELC)
- Christu Sudha Communications & Ministries (CSCM)
- Church of Lutheran Confessions in India (CLCI)
- Deccan Evangelical Lutheran Church (DELC)
- Evangelical Lutheran Church of the Cross (ELCC)
- Good Samaritan Evangelical Lutheran Church (GSELC)
- Lutheran Fellowship of India (LFI)
- South Andhra Lutheran Church (SALC)
- Transfiguration Lutheran Church (TLC)
