= Friedens, Pennsylvania =

Unincorporated community in Pennsylvania, US

Friedens
- Census-designated place
- Flag

- Location within the U.S. state of Pennsylvania Friedens (the United States)
- Coordinates: 40°3′4″N 78°59′44″W
- Country: United States
- State: Pennsylvania
- County: Somerset

Area
  - Total: 3.15 sq mi (8.15 km^{2})
  - Land: 3.15 sq mi (8.15 km^{2})
  - Water: 0 sq mi (0.00 km^{2})

Population (2020)
  - Total: 1,504
  - Density: 478.2/sq mi (184.63/km^{2})
- Time zone: UTC-5 (Eastern (EST))
  - Summer (DST): UTC-4 (EDT)
- ZIP code: 15541
- Area code: 814
- FIPS code: 42-27928

Friedens is a census-designated place (CDP) that is part of Somerset Township, Somerset County, Pennsylvania, United States. The population was 1,523 at the 2010 census. It is part of the Johnstown, Pennsylvania Metropolitan Statistical Area.

== Location ==
Friedens is located west of Indian Lake and Shanksville and east of Somerset and has access to US 219.

=== Sites ===
Friedens is within driving distance of the following attractions:

- Flight 93 National Memorial, approximately eight miles away
- Shawnee State Park (driving towards Bedford)
- Laurel Mountain State Park (on the west side of Somerset, Pennsylvania)
- Somerset County Airport
- the town of Somerset, Pennsylvania and its unique shops and restaurants

== Geography ==
Friedens is located at 40°3′4″N 78°59′44″W (40.051182, -78.995474). According to the United States Census Bureau, the CDP has a total area of 3.1 square miles (8.0 km^{2}), all land.

Like most of the Somerset County area, Friedens contains and is surrounded mostly by farmland, including many family-operated farms.

== Demographics ==
Historical population
Census	Pop.	Note	%±
2020	1,504		—
U.S. Decennial Census

As of the census of 2000, there were 1,673 people, 636 households, and 485 families residing in the CDP. The population density was 533.1 inhabitants per square mile (205.8/km^{2}). There were 682 housing units at an average density of 217.3 per square mile (83.9/km^{2}). The racial makeup of the CDP was 99.34% White, 0.06% African American, 0.12% Native American, 0.18% Asian, 0.06% from other races, and 0.24% from two or more races. Hispanic or Latino of any race were 0.18% of the population.

There were 636 households, out of which 37.3% had children under the age of 18 living with them, 64.9% were married couples living together, 6.6% had a female householder with no husband present, and 23.6% were non-families. 20.6% of all households were made up of individuals, and 9.9% had someone living alone who was 65 years of age or older. The average household size was 2.61 and the average family size was 3.00.

In the CDP, the population was spread out, with 27.0% under the age of 18, 7.8% from 18 to 24, 30.5% from 25 to 44, 21.4% from 45 to 64, and 13.3% who were 65 years of age or older. The median age was 35 years. For every 100 females, there were 99.2 males. For every 100 females age 18 and over, there were 92.9 males.

The median income for a household in the CDP was $36,117, and the median income for a family was $37,232. Males had a median income of $26,576 versus $20,288 for females. The per capita income for the CDP was $16,571. About 8.2% of families and 8.3% of the population were below the poverty line, including 5.8% of those under age 18 and 12.3% of those age 65 or over.

== Education ==
It is in the Somerset Area School District.
