= Samuel S. Day =

Canadian-born American Baptist missionary (1808-1871)

Samuel Stearns Day (13 May, 1808 – 17 September, 1871), also known as Samuel S. Day, was the first Canadian-born American Baptist missionary to Telugu speaking provinces - Visakhapatnam, nearby to British Baptist missionary presence in Orissa (now Odisha); and Nellore, part of then-Madras presidency, later part of Andhra, and currently part of Andhra Pradesh.

He was the founder of American and Canadian Baptist missions in Telugu speaking provinces, especially Telugu Baptist mission at Nellore.

== Biography ==
Day was born in Bastard Township, Ontario, Canada on 13 May 1808 to Jeremiah and Submit Day. He attended Sunday school in 1818. He has the habit of writing review of the past year on occasion of his birthday each year. At the age of 17, he wrote his autobiography on two narrow scraps of paper. In 1825, he was baptized at the "Branch Church" - later renamed to "Leeds Church". He stopped farming and started a career of teaching at Stone School House between 1827 and 1828. He was rebaptized in April 1828 and received into the church fellowship. Later, he continued teaching at Brick School House and then at Stone School House.

In 1831, Day attended seminary in Hamilton, New York, and later joined for ministerial training. Though his initial idea had been to work as missionary to the Native Indians of Canada, but foreign missionary operations in the whole world seemed to be calling. In 1833, on a return trip to Bastard, Day was granted a license to preach by his home church. He was appointed a missionary to India in August 1835.

In 1825 he was ordained to the Baptist ministry at Cortland, New York. In 1835 he graduated from the theological institution at Hamilton, New York. He was ordained on 24 August 1835.

Day married Roenna Clark in 1835.

On 23 September 1835, Day, along with E.L. Abbot and their wives sailed to India for missionary work under the American Baptist Foreign Mission Society (ABFMS). Upon arrival in Calcutta on 5 February 1836, E.L. Abbot departed to Burma, while the Day family proceeded to Vizagapatam - also known by names Vizag or Visakhapatnam.

Upon arrival in Vizag, Day began learning the local Telugu language and went out on trips with London Missionary Society (LMS) missionaries already active in Vizag from 1805; Chicacole (present Srikakulam) was one town visited by him, that appeared to him to be the right place to commence operations of the "American Baptist Mission." On 6 June 1836, Roenna Clark bore him first of their seven children - they named the boy after the American Baptist Foreign Mission Board agent in India, Howard Malcom - Samuel Day was not free to choose where they would settle as missionaries - they were bound to wait for the counsel of Howard Malcom. The family moved to Chicacole and opened a school for its native people - they also performed the first converted [native] Christian marriage at Chicacole.

In March 1837, Day was asked by Malcom to work among the English people in Madras (present Chennai) and with a branch of "Maulmein Church" located over there. While at Madras, he shuttled between Bellary and baptized non-Telugu speaking locals over there in Bellary and also in Madras. In addition, his other duties had been to work with "Madras Auxiliary Bible Society" and "American Baptist Tract Society".

He served on the subcommittee for revising Gospel of Matthew into Telugu language beginning in April 1837. As he had already acquired proficiency to read and speak Telugu, a certain inclination to work among Telugu speaking people forced his family to move in February 1840 into the Telugu-speaking Nellore village, 110 miles north of Madras. He joined Mr. & Mrs. Stephen Van Husen, American missionaries who arrived Nellore in March 1840, and begun working with "Bible Society" [LMS] for a more accurate translation [amend and rewrite] of New Testament into Telugu language. The LMS had already established the first "Protestant mission" among Telugu speakers in 1805, published a Telugu version of the New Testament by 1818 as well as carrying out a rough translation of the Old Testament, and had built the first Protestant Chapel among the Telugus in 1836.

In August 1843, three native converts were baptized in Nellore and by October, a Church was organized. In 1845, Day and his wife became ill and were forced to leave the mission. They sailed to America on 3 December 1845. With Roenna left in America, he sailed again to India along with Mr. and Mrs. Lyman Jewett, American missionaries, and arrived Nellore in February 1849 for a five-year term. From 2 July 1849, he had also started working among Muslims in Nellore. Mrs. Jewett started a girls' "Boarding school", in the meantime.

Day returned to the United States on 7 May 1853 due to periodic illness. He worked as missionary agent for the American Baptist Missionary Union (ABMU) between 1855 and 1859. He frequently travelled across northern US and Canada to raise funds for the missions in India. In 1867, the Reverend A. V. Timpany and his wife, arrived at the Telugu mission to continue the work.

Day died of heart failure on 17 September 1871 at Homer, New York where he is buried.

== Works ==
- History of Christ in Telugu - fully in the words of the four gospels.
- New Testament translation into Telugu with amendments and corrections.
