= William Bampton =

William Bampton (1787–1830), along with James Peggs, was the first missionary to be sent out by the English General Baptists Missionary Society. Bampton and Peggs served in Cuttack, Orissa (present Odisha) in India. Bampton was the first British Baptist missionary to have started a new station at Puri, Orissa -Baptist Mission was established at Puri, largely due to the efforts of Claudius Buchanan, Vice-Provost of the Fort William College, who visited the town in 1806 - he strongly advocated for an establishment of some Christian institution near the temple, Juggernauth.

== Early life ==
William Bampton was born at Bourne Lincolnshire, in 1787. He spent his childhood at Bourne and Thurlby, a nearby village. After receiving basic education from the village school-masters, Bampton moved to Boston at the age of thirteen. Having been accustomed with his parents to attend on the ministry of Binns, then a Baptist minister at Bourne, he started to attend on the ministry of Daniel Taylor, a pastor of Boston Baptist Church; later, Bampton was baptised and joined the church. In 1808, he began preaching occasionally at Swineshead. From 1809, with superintendence of the affairs of church experience at Boston, Bampton moved to Sutterton in 1811 to work in the ministry as an assistant minister. After three years at Sutterton, he became minister at a Baptist church in Goverton, a village nearby to Sutterton.

In 1818, he moved to Grand Yarmouth in Norfolk and in 1820 he offered himself to the General Baptist Missionary Society for missionary service. With delay in prior designed plans to travel India for missionary service along with William Ward, one of the Serampore Trio, he moved to London in 1820. Bampton attended various courses and lectures on medicine and hospital practice. He was ordained on 15 May 1821 at Loughborough. Bampton sailed to India on 29 May 1821 along with William Ward, James Peggs, fellow-missionary and student at Wisbech General Baptist Academy (now Northern Baptist College), and their wives.

== Missionary work ==
He arrived at Madras (present Chennai on 25 September 1821. From Madras, they travelled to Serampore by 15 November 1821. He along with his fellow missionary James Peggs finally arrived at mission station at Cuttack via Calcutta (present Kolkata) by 12 February 1822. By 1822, Cuttack became a centre of missionary labour with an outstation at Puri - it was largely due to efforts of zealous Christian Claudius Buchanan, who strongly advocated for the creation of a Christian institution near the temple Juggernaut (colloquial English name for temple Jagannath Temple, Puri - Ratha Yatra temple car), when he visited in 1806 - After his visit to Orissa, he created public opinion in England for sending missionaries to Orissa - By 1812, missionaries started making appeals to British Government for permission. With a change in British government policy by 1813, they allowed the missionaries to work in Eastern India, officially - in 1816, the New Connexion of General Baptists as a body resolved to do something to enlighten and evangelize the heathens with knowledge of Christianity.

He and James Peggs were deputed and directed to preach the gospel, superintending native schools, and acquiring the language of Orissa. In September 1823, he and his wife left Cuttack to form a new station at the temple of Jagannath Temple, Puri. On 17 September 1825, Bumpton wrote a letter that speaks the kind of work, he was engaged in day-to-day affairs:

I have been out the last five or six days, as usual, and have generally been three or four hours every day, in active contact with the people. Frequently i go and return in good spirits, but sometimes i am low enough. Good spirits are necessary in dealing with my poor people, for there is commonly a great deal amongst them that is very provoking. I frequently tell them that it is a regard to their welfare, that leads me to as i do, and the declaration is received with a sneer. On two or three occasions a number of little children have been officially seated before me, as an intimation that i say nothing worthy the attention of men. Sometimes men profess to hear candidly, and yet i plainly see that they are acting a part which they mean to laugh at afterwards. Sometimes boys, during a whole opportunity, annoy me with vociferous in favour of Juggernauth, and there is one young man, who has several times acted in the same way: as for this sort i do not gratify them so much as to let them see that i take the least notice of them; but when one is not in a good frame it is not easily borne. I think i am more master of myself than i was, in a general way; and i hope, notwithstanding all that is discouraging, that the powerful arm of divine grace will, even here, conquer some, to the confusion of others, and then it will be for me to triumph, though i hope to give my Master all the praise.

He also says "On the whole, i never was so happy in the ministry before, and on the whole, i never was so much given up to it." [sic] On 31 October 1826, he writes again:

This has been one of the worst nights i ever endured. Mockery, mockery, cruel mockery! almost unbearable! I talked for a while, and was heard by some, on the blessings to be enjoyed by faith in Jesus Christ; when a man came, with a hell-hardened countenance, and that peculiar constant laugh, which i can hardly bear. He spoke Hindostanee, so that i understand him worse than i should otherwise have done; but the burden of his cry was, 'Juggernauth is the foundation! Juggernauth is completely God! Victory to Juggernauth,' He clapped his hands; he laughed; he shouted, and induced the rest, or a great part of them, to do the same...

In 1825, Bampton metamorphed himself in native dress, but was criticized by other missionaries, and wrote to his friend saying,

My object in thus metamorphosing myself, is not to please myself, as some have supposed, and may still suppose, for i am more comfortable in my English clothes; but my object is to conciliate the people, in order to promote their salvation, and, defective as i am sure i feel myself to be, in zeal for this vast object,....

Most of the times, his gospel message experienced, an utter rejection. In his own words, writing to his friend in England on 28 March 1827,

It is a fortnight to-day since I came home out of the country, where I had been pretty busy ever since Nov.14, 1826. Perhaps I preached nearly four times a day on an average, all the time I was out. I walked about all the time, and never, that I can remember enjoyed better health. If my soul were but as well qualified for missionary work as my body, I should bear a comparison with most; but then I have much to complain of; but Christ is preached, (however defectively,) and in this I believe you will rejoice. I have, during my tour, many, many, many times had to encounter a most appalling spirit of enmity. I have been hooted out of towns in which I have preached; loaded with whatever abusive terms the vulgar vocabulary of the language could supply, and sometimes the boys have followed me so far shouting, as to surprise me by their perseverance. O how depraved human nature hates the religion of Jesus Christ!

His first convert was a weaver named Erun who was baptised on Christmas Day 1827.

Between 1828 and 1829, he and his wife spent most of their time in Calcutta, mostly due to ill-health; returned to Puri in autumn of 1829, as his health didn't improve [due to diarrhoea], he died on 17 December 1830 at Puri.
