= Perapogu Joseph =

Indian Christian clergy (1932–1994)

Pastor Perupogu Joseph Ayyagaru
- Born: 25 July 1932; Mukthinuthalapadu in erstwhile Madras Presidency
- Died: 24 June 1994 (aged 61); Secunderabad (Telangana)
- Burial place: Protestant Cemetery, Narayanaguda, Hyderabad district (Telangana)
- Education: G. Th. (RBTC) (1958), B. D. (Serampore), M. A. (Osmania), Th. M. (Brite) (1975), Research exposure (SBTS)
- Alma mater: STBC-Ramayapatnam Baptist Theological College, Ramayapatnam (1954–1958), Osmania University, Hyderabad, Brite Divinity School, Fort Worth, Texas (1974–1975); Southern Baptist Theological Seminary, Louisville, Kentucky (1983–1986)
- Occupations: Pastor, Counsellor
- Years active: 1958–1994
- Known for: Counselling
- Parent(s): Smt. Santoshamma (Mother); Sri Aseervadam (Father)
- Religion: Christianity
- Church: Samavesam of Telugu Baptist Churches Society
- Ordained: STBC-Centenary Baptist Zion Church, Bapatla (1958–1959)
- Writings: Joseph, Perapogu (1975). A Comparative study of Pastoral care in the work of a parish pastor and Hospital chaplain (Th.M thesis). Brite Divinity School.; Joseph, Perapogu (1990). "Chapter 9: Relevance of shepherding image in pastoral care in India today". In Joseph, Suppogu (ed.). Reflections on Theology Today: Papers presented by the ACTC faculty during the academic year 1988–89 on theology and ministry of the Church. ACTC, Secunderabad. pp. 99–103.
- Congregations served: STBC-Centenary Baptist Zion Church, Bapatla (1958–1959), Indian Army Corps of EME (1960–1969)
- Offices held: Principal (in-charge) of Andhra Christian Theological College (1993–1994)
- Title: The Reverend

Perupogu Joseph (25 July 1932 – 24 June 1994) was a military chaplain in the Indian Army Corps of EME and a counselor who taught students in Serampore College, Serampore and Andhra Christian Theological College, Secunderabad.

== Studies ==
=== Propaedeutic ===
During 1954–1958, Joseph studied Theology in STBC-Ramayapatnam Baptist Theological Seminary in Ramayapatnam during the time of Maurice Blanchard. He later upgraded his studies to B. D. through the same Seminary. As a matter of pact between Senate of Serampore College (University) and other Universities both within the country and overseas, those who have completed a B. D. could take up a postgraduate degree in Philosophy or such other inter-disciplinary streams of study. Joseph used the opportunity to enroll for a M. A. programme in state-run Osmania University in Hyderabad during his stint as Padre in sixties, which he completed in due course of time.

=== Specialized studies ===
Joseph moved to United States in 1974, where he undertook a one-year master's degree programme in Brite Divinity School, Fort Worth, Texas. His researched in Counselling and wrote a thesis, titled, A Comparative study of Pastoral care in the work of a parish pastor and Hospital chaplain. During 1983–1984, he began Doctoral studies, again in United States, returning to India in 1986.

== Career ==
=== Military Chaplain ===
It was on 4 November 1959 that Joseph was appointed as padre in the Indian Army Corps of EME, where he served in a multilingual and multicultural setting for nearly a decade. He relinquished his Military duty voluntarily to begin teaching.

From 1973 to 1974, Joseph was Chaplain at Baptist Christian Hospital, Nellore.

=== Spiritual Formator ===
Joseph taught Inter-disciplinary courses as prescribed in Syllabi of Senate of Serampore College (University), which included Practical theology, Pastoral counselling and allied subjects.

==== Andhra Pradesh ====
From the academic year 1968–1969, Joseph proceeded to his Alma mater, which had moved to Rajahmundry to take up teaching on invitation from Louis F. Knoll. Earlier, Ecumenism among some Protestant groups resulted in formation of Andhra Christian Theological College in 1964 in Rajahmundry. Samavesam of Telugu Baptist Churches Society moved its B. D. section in academic year 1967–1968 under guidance of Louis F. Knoll, which was stationed in the campus of Andhra Christian Theological College, then in river town of Rajahmundry. Joseph, by virtue of this shift, moved to Rajahmundry in 1968, where he continued to be on rolls of Ramayapatnam Baptist Theological College and taught students of dual entities. Some of his students comprised G. Samuel, STBC, N. Thomas, STBC, S. E. Krupa Rao, CBCNC, among others. In 1972, when Ramayapatnam Baptist Theological College was fully-integrated into Andhra Christian Theological College and re-located to Secunderabad, P. Joseph moved to Nellore as Hospital Chaplain.

==== West Bengal ====
In 1976, Joseph joined Serampore College, where he was faculty member in Practical theology, in place of J. J. P. Tiga and taught for two successive academic years until 1978 when he was succeeded by J. K. Skirrow. With expansion plans in Practical theology master's courses, in Serampore College, Joseph's inclusion in faculty provided the thrust for the subject. When Joseph moved to Serampore, it was Saral Kumar Chatterjee, who was at the helm of administration, followed by R. L. Rodrigues. By the time Joseph left Serampore, it was S. Mukhopadhyay, who was Principal. During Joseph's tenure in Serampore, M. Devadas, CBCNC, who had come to upgrade his studies was identified by Senate of Serampore College to pursue further studies leading to post-graduation in Practical Theology through United Theological College, Bangalore with a view to return to the College to take up teaching. Inadvertently, Devadas became Joseph's successor in Serampore, where he would carry on the legacy of the discipline.

==== Telangana ====
In 1978, Joseph transferred himself to Andhra Christian Theological College, Secunderabad under Principalship of Cantabrigian, Victor Premasagar, CSI. Initially, there was G. Sampurna Rao, AELC, who used to teach Practical theology. Joseph also taught Pastoral counseling, which was strengthened with the return of M. Victor Paul, AELC from overseas research exposure in 1979. In 1983 under Principalship of Komaravalli David, CBCNC, Joseph proceeded on research exposure, his position was filled with inclusion of Manoranjan Luke, MCI. On his return in 1986, Suppogu Joseph, STBC was Principal. Joseph continued his teaching to Telugu-speaking students hailing from Andhra Pradesh, Maharashtra, Karnataka, Tamil Nadu and Odisha. In 1993 and 1994, Joseph was given additional responsibilities as in-charge Principal by his colleagues, M. Victor Paul, AELC and G. Sampurna Rao, AELC solely on his merits as an able administrator.

The period between 1978 through 1994 that Joseph was Spiritual Formator in Secunderabad, there were many students, some of whom held leadership positions in their respective Church Societies, comprising Ch. Victor Moses, AELC, V. E. Christopher, AELC, B. Suneel Bhanu, AELC, K. Frederick Paradesi Babu, AELC, Samuel Kanaka Prasad, CSI, B. D. Prasada Rao, CSI, V. Prasada Rao, CSI, Eggoni Pushpa Lalitha, CSI, T. George Cornelious, CSI, P. Issac Vara Prasad, CSI, among others.

== Death and reminisce ==
In mid-1994, Joseph underwent a bypass surgery. Somehow, the operation failed and he died in the early hours of 24 June 1994. His sudden death shook the theological community in Secunderabad and Hyderabad. Andhra Christian Theological College, where Joseph taught observed a day of mourning. Joseph was accorded ecclesiastical honours befitting a cleric. A burial service was conducted at then Protestant Cemetery in Narayanaguda led by his former students G. Samuel, Nalla Thomas, and Regunta Yesurathnam, then principal of Andhra Christian Theological College in the presence of other members of faculty and students.

Academic offices
Preceded by Position created	Teacher – in – Practical theology, Ramayapatnam Baptist Theological College, Rajahmundry; 1969–1972	Succeeded by Position dissolved
Preceded by J. J. P. Tiga, GELC	Teacher – in – Practical theology, Serampore College, Serampore; 1976–1978	Succeeded by J. K. Skirrow, BMS, M. Devadas, CBCNC
Preceded by M. Victor Paul, AELC	Teacher – in – Practical theology, Andhra Christian Theological College, Secunderabad; 1978–1994	Succeeded by Manoranjan Luke, MCI, G. Sampurna Rao, AELC
