= Ravela Joseph =

Indian priest

The Reverend R. Joseph, STBC Ayyagaru
- Born: Ravela Joseph; 1 September 1937; Ravela, Northern Circars (Madras Presidency)
- Died: 12 April 2024 (aged 86); Secunderabad (Telangana)
- Burial place: Christian Cemetery, Narayanguda, Hyderabad
- Other names: R. J. Ayyagaru, /Acharya Ravela Ayyagaru, Rev. Ravela Ayyagaru
- Citizenship: Indian
- Education: L. Th. (Serampore), B. D. (Serampore), S. T. M. (Andover-Newton), M. Th. (Serampore); M. A. (Osmania); Research exposure (UTC, Bangalore)
- Alma mater: ABM-Ramayapatnam Baptist Theological Seminary, Ramayapatnam (Andhra Pradesh), Andover Newton Theological School, Newton (United States), United Theological College, Bangalore (Karnataka); Osmania University, Hyderabad (Telangana)
- Occupation: Theologian
- Years active: 1959 – 2024 (65 years)
- Known for: Creative poetic compositions in Telugu language
- Parent(s): Smt. Santoshamma (Mother), Pastor R. Paul (Father)
- Religion: Christianity
- Church: Protestant – Samavesam of Telugu Baptist Churches (STBC)
- Ordained: American Baptist Foreign Mission Society
- Writings: See complete list
- Offices held: President, ABM-Ramayapatnam Baptist Theological Seminary, Ramayapatnam (Andhra Pradesh) (1993–1997)
- Title: The Reverend

Ravela Joseph (1 September 1937 – 12 April 2024) was a Sapphire jubilee-Priest involved in Spiritual formation from the mid-1960s into the early 2000s in the Telugu states. He taught Systematic theology in Major Seminaries affiliated with the Senate of Serampore College (University), the nation's first modern University {a University under Section 2 (f) of the University Grants Commission Act, 1956} with degree-granting authority validated by a Danish Charter and ratified by the Government of West Bengal.

Joseph died on 12 April 2024 while undergoing treatment in Secunderabad. A Funeral mass was conducted at 14:30 hours on Monday, 15 April 2024 at STBC-Narayanaguda Baptist Church, Hyderabad led by G. Samuel, STBC. The solemn mass was well-attended by the faithful, notable among them being Church Historian B. C. Paul, AELC, Comparative religion Scholar T. Swami Raju, AELC, Entomologist P. Judson, Old Testament scholar Ravela Jeeva Kumar, STBC and others. A graveside burial mass held at 16:30 hours, the same day, at Christian Cemetery, Narayanguda, Hyderabad where Joseph's Mortal Remains were buried.

== Contribution ==
Joseph's academic regimen as a Seminarian in established portals of learning, both in India and the United States shaped his thinking. His contribution, in particular to Church history in the Telugu states and to the field of Telugu literature, has marked him out as a major contributor enriching the history of Telugu people. A content analysis of the writings of Joseph reveals his voracious readership and an ability to quote from a variety of readings.

=== Telugu literature ===
In Encyclopaedia of Indian Literature, published in 1987 by Sahitya Akademi, India's National Academy of Letters dedicated to the promotion of literature in the languages of India, the contribution of R. Joseph to the field of Telugu Christian Literature in the modern times has been acknowledged. Incidentally, it was Joseph who took the onus to compile an exhaustive bibliography of original Christian writings in Telugu language in the eighties during the tenure of D. S. Satyaranjan, IPC at the Senate of Serampore College (University) in the post-Vatican context. This bibliography became a ready source of reference for Theologians and those with academic interest to peruse material on Telugu Christian Literature.

=== Church history ===
With special reference to the American Baptist Churches in Telugu states, Joseph's postgraduate thesis of 1973 was published in 2003 under the title, A History of the Telugu Baptist Churches: American Baptist Telugu Mission.

=== Systematic theology ===
The influence of the Bhakti Movement had touched Christian writings and lyrics. R. Joseph had researched the lyrics of Puroshottam Choudhary. In 2011, James Elisha Taneti in History of the Telugu Christians: A Bibliography published by Scarecrow, Plymouth writes that Ravela Joseph book on the life of Puroshottam Choudhary had been to analyse his contribution as an early Indian Christian to Christology.

=== Ecumenism ===
As a member of the fully-ecumenical, Fellowship of Telugu Churches, Joseph had been an active contributor to the unity of the Churches in the Telugu states. In 2016, Joseph's paper on Promoting unity of the body of Christ evoked an action-based response from the participants. Joseph's participation in ecumenical gatherings brought him into direct contact with Catholic prelates, Anthony Poola, Addagatla Chinna Innayya, Mallavarapu Prakash, Doraboina Moses Prakasam, Gali Bali and others.

== Writings ==
Inter-disciplinary research pursuits in the fields of Church history, Systematic theology, Telugu literature and Ecumenism prompted Joseph to publish his writings, these were spread over five decades, beginning with the 1970s.

=== 1973–2002 ===
- Joseph, Ravela (1973). The American Baptist Mission among the Telugus (S.T.M. thesis). Andover Newton Theological School.
- ——— (1980). A theological analysis of the writings of Purushottam Choudhary (M.Th. thesis). Senate of Serampore College (University).
- ——— (March 1982). "Purushottama Choudari: His Special Contribution to Indian Christian Theology". Religion and Society. 29 (1): 29–54.
- ——— (June 1982). "The Christology of an Indian Christian: Purushottama Choudari (1803-1890)". Bangalore Theological Forum. 14 (1): 69–81.
- ———; Suneel Bhanu, Busi (1993). Bibliography of Original Christian Writings in India in Telugu.
- ——— (1993). "Samavesam of Telugu Baptist Churches: A Brief History and Baptist Doctrinal Distinctives". In Toews, Paul (ed.). Mennonites and Baptists: A Continuing Conversation. Kindred Press. pp. 133–140.

=== 2003-2012 ===
- ——— (2003). A History of the Telugu Baptist Churches (American Baptist Mission).
- ——— (2004). Bhakti Theology of Puroshottam Choudhary.
- ——— (2012). "Yarraguntla, Paraiah". In Hedlund, Roger E.; Athyal, Jesudas M.; Kalapati, Joshua; Richard, Jessica (eds.). The Oxford Encyclopedia of South Asian Christianity. Oxford University Press. ISBN 9780198073857.
- ——— (2012). "Chetti Bhanumurthy". In Hedlund, Roger E.; Athyal, Jesudas M.; Kalapati, Joshua; Richard, Jessica (eds.). The Oxford Encyclopedia of South Asian Christianity. Oxford University Press. ISBN 9780198073857.
- ——— (2012). "Jagannatham, Pulipaka". In Hedlund, Roger E.; Athyal, Jesudas M.; Kalapati, Joshua; Richard, Jessica (eds.). The Oxford Encyclopedia of South Asian Christianity. Oxford University Press. ISBN 9780198073857.
- ——— (2012). "Samavesam of Telugu Baptist Churches". In Hedlund, Roger E.; Athyal, Jesudas M.; Kalapati, Joshua; Richard, Jessica (eds.). The Oxford Encyclopedia of South Asian Christianity. Oxford University Press. ISBN 9780198073857.
- ——— (2012). "Choudhari, Purushottam". In Hedlund, Roger E.; Athyal, Jesudas M.; Kalapati, Joshua; Richard, Jessica (eds.). The Oxford Encyclopedia of South Asian Christianity. Oxford University Press. ISBN 9780198073857.

=== 2013-2022 ===
- ——— (2013). Christian Theology (in Telugu). Hyderabad: GS Media. ISBN 978-9385080197.
- ——— (2016). "Unity of the Body of Christ" (Document). Hyderabad: Fellowship of Telugu Churches.
- ——— (2017). Fr. Martin Luther, OSA – The Church Reformer (in Telugu). Hyderabad: GS Media. ISBN 978-9385194979.
- ——— (2020). Towards the Reform of Telugu Churches: Some Propositions and Proposals. Hyderabad: Fellowship of Telugu Churches.

== Reminiscences ==
- Rev. Talathoti Punnaiah, STBC who underwent a 1-year spirituality course in 1969 at the Ramayapatnam Baptist Theological Seminary at Ramayapatnam as an Aspirant to discern his avocation towards religious life writes that,

Ravela Joseph was the youngest among the Teachers at the Ramayapatnam Seminary and was teaching Church history. He used to love playing football. Later he did his S.T.M. in the United States of America and then M. Th. He later became the President of the Seminary and Professor at the Andhra Christian Theological College. Joseph is a good writer, singer and composer.

- Rev. Fr. Anthonyraj Thumma, RCM, Secretary, Catholic Bishops Conference of India Office for Dialogue and Desk for Ecumenism, NBCLC, Bangalore,

The scholarship and writings of Ravela Joseph is not limited to theology alone. His research in Church History has yielded many fruits in the form of books on the history of the Early Church, Telugu Baptist Church, Martin Luther's Reformation, etc. He is also a well-known poet, essayist and playwright in Telugu.

- Paul D. Wiebe, Department of Sociology and the Center for Asian Studies at the University of Illinois,

Ravela Joseph, a philosopher, poet and Professor Emeritus at Andhra Christian Theological College, Hyderabad, assisted me in the collection of the data in relation to which my PhD thesis was written and remained close friend.

== Studies and academics ==
=== General studies ===
During the 1950s Joseph pursued a Pre-university course at AELC-Andhra Christian College, Guntur. He then underwent a Teacher-training course and became a Teacher at a government-run school. Following his call towards spirituality, he discerned his vocation and took to theology, enrolling at a major seminary in Ramayapatnam. In 1985, Joseph enrolled at the State-run Osmania University from where he studied Master of Arts.

=== Propadeutic studies ===
The American Baptist Mission/Samavesam of Telugu Baptist Churches was one of the Protestant missions that began its Christian mission in the early nineteenth century in India whose south India ministries were headquartered in Ramayapatnam in Andhra Pradesh. R. Joseph evinced interest in pursuing Priesthood as a full-time vocation and underwent Spiritual formation at the historic Baptist Theological Seminary, Ramayapatnam studying under the Principalship of The Rev. Maurice Blanchard and other faculty comprising The Rev. G. Solomon. The seminary was directly affiliated with the Senate of Serampore College (University) and Joseph was awarded an L. Th. He later upgraded his studies to earn a B.D. in 1967, awarded by Seminary President, Louis F. Knoll.

=== Research studies ===
==== United States: Newton ====
In 1972, The Council of the Ramayapatnam Baptist Theological Seminary, Ramayapatnam and the Samavesam of Telugu Baptist Churches sent R. Joseph to the Andover Newton Theological School, Newton for postgraduate studies where he earned a Master of Sacred Theology (S.T.M.) degree and on his return continued to teach at the Seminary which by then had integrated its B. D. section into the Andhra Christian Theological College and R. Joseph was reassigned to teach there by the Samavesam of Telugu Baptist Churches.

==== India: Bangalore ====
In 1978, the Samavesam of Telugu Baptist Churches had accorded study leave to R. Joseph who went to the United Theological College, Bangalore to upgrade his S. T. M. obtained from the United States to Master of Theology (M. Th.) degree and researched the writings of Puroshottam Choudhary under the supervision of Joshua Russell Chandran and Eric J. Lott, his Professors. Joseph's companions at the college included G. Devakadasham, G. D. V. Prasad and others. By 1980, R. Joseph rejoined Andhra Christian Theological College and resumed his teaching responsibilities.

Again in 1983, he returned to the United Theological College, Bangalore to undertake doctoral studies but had to leave it midway as he was recalled to teach at his alma mater the Baptist Theological Seminary, Ramayapatnam from where he again joined the Andhra Christian Theological College.

== Teaching ==
=== Andhra Pradesh ===
Soon after R. Joseph completed his licentiate, he began teaching at his Alma mater. He also upgraded his studies to earn a B. D. in 1967 at the Ramayapatnam Baptist Theological Seminary, Ramayapatnam. By this time, efforts among the Protestants to form a unified seminary gained credence leading to the formation of the Andhra Christian Theological College in 1964 Rajahmundry by,

- the Baptists of the Convention of Baptist Churches of Northern Circars,
- the Lutherans of the Andhra Evangelical Lutheran Church and the South Andhra Lutheran Church,
- the Methodists of the Methodist Church in India,
- the Anglicans, Congregationalists and the Wesleyans of the Church of South India

However, compared to the Ramayapatnam Baptist Theological Seminary which was entitled to admit students for the Bachelor of Divinity degree courses – that too with English as the medium of instruction, the new unified Protestant seminary offered only Licentiate in Theology level courses in Telugu medium. The Samavesam of Telugu Baptist Churches was way ahead of its times both in terms of the academic credentials of its faculty as well as its affiliation with the Senate of Serampore College (University). Though the Baptists of the Samavesam of Telugu Baptist Churches were in favour of joining the new unified Protestant initiative in Rajahmundry, the integration did not seem ripe at that stage. R. Joseph had just finished his graduate studies at Ramayapatnam in 1967 and just at that time his Principal, The Rev. Maurice Blanchard and his successor The Rev. Louis F. Knoll decided to experiment and moved their B.D. section from Ramayapatnam to Rajahmundry and functioned as a separate entity within the premises of the Andhra Christian Theological College in Rajahmundry. R. Joseph's teaching companions, K. Wilson, K. S. Prasada Rao, Tracy G. Gipson, Alice M. Findlay, B. R. Moses and Louis F. Knoll moved to Rajahmundry while G. Solomon, S. Joseph, P. Joseph and D. Daniel joined later.

In his second phase at Ramayapatnam, R. Joseph rejoined the seminary in 1984 taking up teaching. This institution was training Catechetists to take up rural evangelism and R. Joseph took responsibility to build up the seminary and stayed in Ramayapatnam until 1997 when he finally moved again to Hyderabad.

=== Telangana ===
By 1972, the Samavesam of Telugu Baptist Churches fully integrated its B.D. section into the Andhra Christian Theological College which by then was relocated to Hyderabad. R. Joseph was sent on study leave to the United States to upgrade his studies to enable him to take up teaching at the unified Protestant Theologiate in Hyderabad and returned in 1973 to take up teaching of Theology. On his return, R. Joseph joined the Andhra Christian Theological College which was by then led by the Old Testament Scholar Victor Premasagar while his other companions from Ramayapatnam continued to teach there who included S. Joseph, G. Solomon, K. S. Prasada Rao, and Tracy G. Gipson.

While this was so, K. Wilson had by that time left the Office of the Priesthood moving to the State-run Osmania University to take up teaching of the Philosophy as a civilian. After teaching for nearly six years at the Andhra Christian Theological College, R. Joseph had to revisit his academics to tune up his postgraduate degree earned in the United States to suit the requirements of the Senate of Serampore College (University) and left for Bangalore in 1978, rejoining the college in 1980 and taught for nearly three more years till 1983 when he went on study leave to his alma mater at Bangalore.

After a gap of more than a decade, R. Joseph rejoined the Andhra Christian Theological College in 1997 which by then was led by Rev. R. Yesurathnam, the Principal and R. Joseph continued to teach Theology for the aspirants until he retired on attaining superannuation in 2003.

R. Joseph's students at the Ramayapatnam Baptist Theological Seminary, Ramayapatnam and the Andhra Christian Theological College have substantially contributed to the growth of Christianity in India and include,

- Bishop Emeritus Thalari Samuel Kanaka Prasad, CSI-Bishop Emeritus – in – Medak,
- Bishop Emeritus Boyineni Deva Prasada Rao, CSI, Bishop – in – Rayalaseema,
- Bishop Emeritus Eggoni Pushpalalitha, CSI, Bishop – in – Nandyal,
- Bishop Emeritus Vadapalli Prasada Rao, CSI, Bishop – in – Dornakal,
- Bishop George Cornelious, CSI, Bishop – in – Krishna-Godavari,
- Bishop Peyyala Issac Vara Prasad, CSI, Bishop – in – Rayalaseema,

Academic offices
Preceded by Ryder Devapriam, CSI	Professor – in – Systematic Theology, Andhra Christian Theological College, Secunderabad (Telangana); 1974–1984; 1997–2003	Succeeded by B. J. Christie Kumar, STBC
Other offices
Preceded by Danam Israel, STBC	President, ABM-Ramayapatnam Baptist Theological College, Ramayapatnam (Andhra Pradesh); 1993–1997	Succeeded by J. M. Franklin, STBC
Notes and references
1. Taneti, J.E. (2011). History of the Telugu Christians: A Bibliography. ATLA Bibliography Series. Scarecrow Press. p. 91. ISBN 978-0-8108-7509-8.
