= G. Samuel =

The Reverend G. Samuel, STBC B. D. (Serampore)
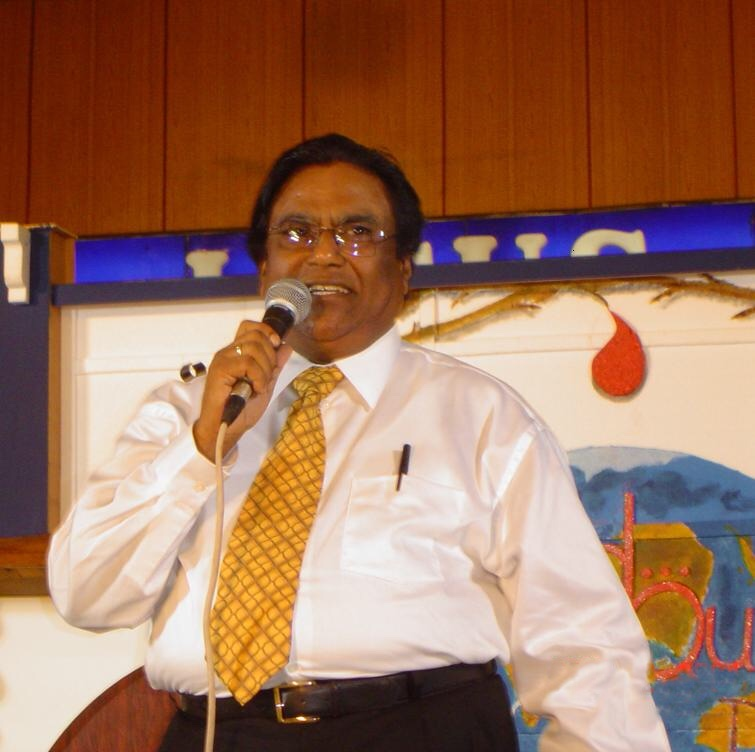
- Born: Gollapalle Samuel; 5 January 1945 (age 81); Udayagiri, Nellore district
- Citizenship: India
- Education: B. D. (Serampore); Ramayapatnam Baptist Theological Seminary, Ramayapatnam
- Occupation: Baptist Priest
- Years active: 1967 to present
- Spouse: Eva
- Children: Sarah Rose, Mary Sucharita Babbili, David Prashant Gollapalle, Solomon Sumonth
- Parent(s): Smt. Saramma and Sri Simon

Ecclesiastical career
- Religion: Christianity
- Church: Samavesam of Telugu Baptist Churches (STBC)
- Ordained: 1973
- Congregations: Nagaland, Telangana
- Offices held: Missionary Pastor, Nagaland, Pastor, Baptist Church, Narayanaguda, Hyderabad
- Title: The Reverend

The Rev. G. Samuel is the senior Pastor of Baptist Church Hyderabad, a church with a congregation of over 13,000 and services in four different languages.

The Rev. G. Samuel was born on 5 January 1945 in a small village called Udayagiri, Nellore district in India. He lost his father at the age of five, and his mother raised him as a Christian and encouraged him to become a full-time minister and finished his Bachelor of Divinity from the Ramayapatnam Baptist Theological Seminary, Ramayapatnam studying between 1962-1966 which was then overseen by Maurice Blanchard and Louis F. Knoll and was also taught by the Old Testament Scholar, Gaddala Solomon and was awarded the degree in the ensuing convocation of the Senate of Serampore College (University) by then Registrar, Chetti Devasahayam, CBCNC.

Samuel was a Missionary Pastor in Nagaland from 1967 through 1970. After coming back from Nagaland, he was appointed as the first full-time Pastor for Baptist Church Hyderabad on 22 June 1970. He was ordained in 1973. Samuel has acted as president of the Andhra Pradesh chapter of the All-India Christian Council.

As an important ecclesiastical figure among the Samavesam of Telugu Baptist Churches, Samuel had been in the forefront of leadership together with S. Benjamin, N. Thomas, and K. Prabhudas and had visited the American Baptist Churches in the United States of America in the nineties. During the 9th World Telugu Christian Summit held in 2017 in Sydney, Australia, Samuel also took part in it together with his fellow companions, Ravela Joseph, STBC and Suppogu Joseph, STBC in the presence of the Church Historian, B. C. Paul, AELC.

== Personal life ==
Although the institution of marriage is not compulsory among Protestant Clergy, Samuel chose to get married on 27 June 1966 to Eva and together they went to Nagaland where their first child Sarah Rose was born in Nagaland. Samuel and Eva together have 4 children namely Sarah Rose, Mary Sucharita Babbili, David Prashant Gollapalle and Solomon Sumanth. David Gollapalle is the Junior Pastor and Solomon Sumonth is the Worship leader of Baptist Church Hyderabad.
