= Nalla Thomas =

Indian Christian pastor (1946–2021)

Pastor Nalla Thomas, STBC Ayyagaru
- Born: 2 March 1946; Nellutla, in Warangal Division District of erstwhile princely State of Hyderabad
- Died: 19 April 2021 (aged 75); Secunderabad (Telangana)
- Burial place: Bhoiguda, Secunderabad district (Telangana)
- Education: L. Th. (Serampore) (1970), B. D. (Serampore) (1975)
- Alma mater: STBC-Preston Institute, Jangaon (Telangana), OU-Arts and Science College, Secunderabad (Telangana), Andhra Christian Theological College, Rajahmundry (Andhra Pradesh) (1967–1970), MCI-Leonard Theological College, Jabalpur (Madhya Pradesh) (1973–1975)
- Occupation: Priest
- Years active: 1974–2015
- Known for: Spiritual development
- Religion: Christianity
- Church: Samavesam of Telugu Baptist Churches Society
- Congregations served: CBCNEI-Telugu Baptist Church, Maligaon (Assam) (1970–1972); STBC-Unruhpura Centenary Baptist Church, Jangaon (Telangana) (1975–1984); STBC-Centenary Baptist Church, Clock Tower, Secunderabad (Telangana) (1991–2015)
- Offices held: Associate General Secretary, Samavesam of Telugu Baptist Churches (1984–1991), Member, Board of Governors, Andhra Christian Theological College (1984–1991), Treasurer, Baptist Youth Fellowship, India(1992–2004)
- Title: The Reverend

Nalla Thomas (2 March 1946 – 19 April 2021) was an Asian Christian and a spiritual personality, who served the Church in Assam and undivided Andhra Pradesh for nearly four decades, spanning the 1970s to the early 2000s. He was known for composing hymns to enhance spiritual direction and devotion. Thomas also served as an Ecclesiastical administrator of the Samavesam of Telugu Baptist Churches Society.

In 2016, on Telangana State Formation Day, the Government of Telangana included Thomas's name in a list of 62 awardees who had made significant contributions in various fields. Under the category of Spiritual Personalities, Thomas was honored alongside two other spiritual leaders: Vedic scholar Sri Kodakandla Narasimha Rama Sidhanthi and Islamic scholar Sri Janab Mufti Ajeemuddin Saheb of Jamia Nizamia. The three spiritual figures, along with 59 others, were honored on the occasion by the then Governor of Telangana, E. S. L. Narasimhan and the Chief Minister of Telangana, K. Chandrashekar Rao.

== Contribution ==
=== Ordination of women priests ===
Thomas was a proponent of the ordination of women in Protestant denominations and ordained two women during his pastorate in Secunderabad. He was also invited to the conclaves of the Association of Theologically Trained Women of India, which were led by Smt. Navamani Elia Peter (MCI), The Rev. Florence Deenadayalan (CSI), and Smt. Johanna Rose Ratnavathi (AELC).

=== Vocation promotion ===
As a member of the Board of Governors of the near-ecumenical Andhra Christian Theological College in the 1980s, Thomas provided valuable leadership to the theologate in matters of seminary administration. Representing the Samavesam of Telugu Baptist Churches on the Board in Secunderabad, he played a pivotal role in guiding youth in congregations to recognize their vocational calling and prepare themselves for the path of priesthood.

=== Ecclesiastical administration ===
Much of Thomas's contribution was in undivided Andhra Pradesh. After returning from Assam, he began focusing on the overall leadership of the Samavesam of Telugu Baptist Churches (STBC), starting with youth development and spiritual growth initiatives. He was later appointed as Associate General Secretary of the STBC, with ecclesiastical jurisdiction spanning Tamil Nadu and undivided Andhra Pradesh.

Thomas worked closely with other spiritual leaders, including The Revds. Suppogu Joseph, G. Samuel, and Ravela Joseph, of the STBC. In 1988, as part of the STBC leadership, he visited several churches in the United States at the invitation of the American Baptist International Ministries. He also spent four months at Charleston Baptist Temple, Charleston, West Virginia, as a guest of its pastor, The Rev. David Fish of the American Baptist Mission.

=== Scriptural ===
Some Protestant groups had been working to make the sacred Scriptures available in the Lambadi language. To this end, the Bible Society of India (BSI) initiated the translation work. This effort was initially undertaken by The Rev. B. E. Devaraj of the Church of South India (CSI), who was teaching at Andhra Christian Theological College, then located in the river town of Rajahmundry. Later, The Rev. Lal Singh Lazarus (CSI) took on the responsibility of continuing the translation.

Simultaneously, the Samavesam of Telugu Baptist Churches (STBC) was engaged in ministries among the Lambadis through Banjara Development Trust. During this time, The Revds. Robbie and James Francovich of the Cooperative Baptist Fellowship were also ministering to the Lambadis and took a keen interest in the progress of the translation work.

When the Bible Society of India Andhra Pradesh Auxiliary approached Thomas to release a copy of the New Testament in the Lambadi language, he unwittingly became part of history. The New Testament was officially released on 25 October 1999 at the STBC-Centenary Baptist Church, Clock Tower, Secunderabad. The event was attended by Old Testament scholars The Rev. G. Babu Rao (CBCNC), who served as the auxiliary secretary of the BSI Andhra Pradesh Auxiliary, and The Rev. G. D. V. Prasad (CSI), the translations director of BSI. Also present was Sri Bidyut Kumar Pramanik, the then General Secretary of the BSI.

== Early life, education and spirituality ==
=== Telangana ===
Thomas completed his early schooling at the STBC-Preston Institute in Jangaon, which was renowned for providing quality education. For his collegiate studies, he moved to Secunderabad to pursue a pre-university course at the OU-Arts and Science College (now Postgraduate College, Secunderabad).

=== Andhra Pradesh ===
Thomas discerned his calling toward spirituality and approached the Samavesam of Telugu Baptist Churches (STBC), which evaluated his candidature and potential for Christian ministry. During this period, The Revds. Louis F. Knoll, Maurice Blanchard, and Tracy Greer Gipson, all of the American Baptist Mission (ABM), were leading theological education efforts.

For his spiritual formation, Thomas enrolled at near-ecumenical Andhra Christian Theological College (ACTC) in Rajahmundry, where he studied from 1967 to 1970, completing an L. Th. program under the principalship of Old Testament scholar The Rev. W. D. Coleman (AELC). His study companions included The Rev. D. J. Jeremiah (CBCNC) and The Rev. B. J. Christie Kumar (STBC).

At ACTC, Thomas had the opportunity to interact with members of various denominations, including Methodists, Lutherans, Baptists, Anglicans, Congregationalists, Presbyterians, and Wesleyans. After completing his ministerial studies in Rajahmundry, he returned to the Deccan Association of the Samavesam of Telugu Baptist Churches to begin his ministry.

During the convocation of the Senate of Serampore College (University) held in 1971, led by its Registrar, The Rev. Chetti Devasahayam (CBCNC), Thomas was awarded the L.Th. degree.

=== Madhya Pradesh ===
In 1973, Thomas moved to Madhya Pradesh, where he spent two years upgrading his studies at Leonard Theological College, Jabalpur, an institution managed by the Methodist Church in India. There, he studied in a near-ecumenical setting that included members from various Protestant denominations and the Orthodox Church. The college was led by its then principal, The Rev. John Radhakrishnan (MCI), supported by a faculty that included The Revds. Saiyyad Mohammed Zahir Ahsan (MCI), D. V. Singh (MCI), Cariappa Samuel (MCI), and S. K. Parmar (MCI), among others.

During the 1976 convocation of the Senate of Serampore College (University), Thomas was awarded the B.D. degree by the Registrar, The Rev. Johannes Thoft Krogh (NELC).

=== Special studies in Biblical languages ===
As a seminarian in Rajahmundry from 1967 to 1970, Thomas showed a keen interest in studying Biblical Greek and Biblical Hebrew, demonstrating strong cognitive skills in language acquisition. He was greatly influenced by the renowned Old Testament scholar The Rev. Victor Premasagar (CSI), a Cambridge Tripos graduate, as well as The Revds. K. David (CBCNC) and Muriel Spurgeon Carder (CBM), who taught Biblical Greek. In 1969, the seminary faculty was further strengthened by the addition of The Revds. M. Victor Paul (AELC) and Suppogu Joseph (STBC), both of whom were experts in the New Testament.

From 1973 to 1974, while pursuing his B.D. studies in Jabalpur, Thomas maintained his enthusiasm for Biblical languages, studying Biblical Greek and Hebrew under a new team of scholars. In 1975, he moved to Jangaon to lead a congregation. Around the same time, Andhra Christian Theological College (ACTC) relocated from Rajahmundry to Secunderabad.

Thomas remained committed to his academic pursuits, frequently visiting ACTC in Secunderabad to continue studying Biblical languages under The Rev. Victor Premasagar and The Rev. K. David. These efforts led him to attempt university examinations, aiming to qualify for a postgraduate course in Biblical studies at United Theological College, Bangalore. However, circumstances took a different turn, and Thomas chose to continue his pastoral work in Jangaon.

== Career ==
=== Assam ===
After completing his spiritual formation in 1970, Thomas was sent by the STBC to Maligaon, Guwahati, Assam, where he served as pastor of a Telugu-speaking congregation for two years. The Telugu Baptist Church in Maligaon was a branch of the Guwahati Baptist Church, operating under the aegis of the Council of Baptist Churches in Northeast India. This church primarily catered to the spiritual needs of railway employees from undivided Andhra Pradesh.

In 1972, Thomas left Guwahati to pursue a special course under the aegis of the National Council of Churches in India.

=== Telangana ===
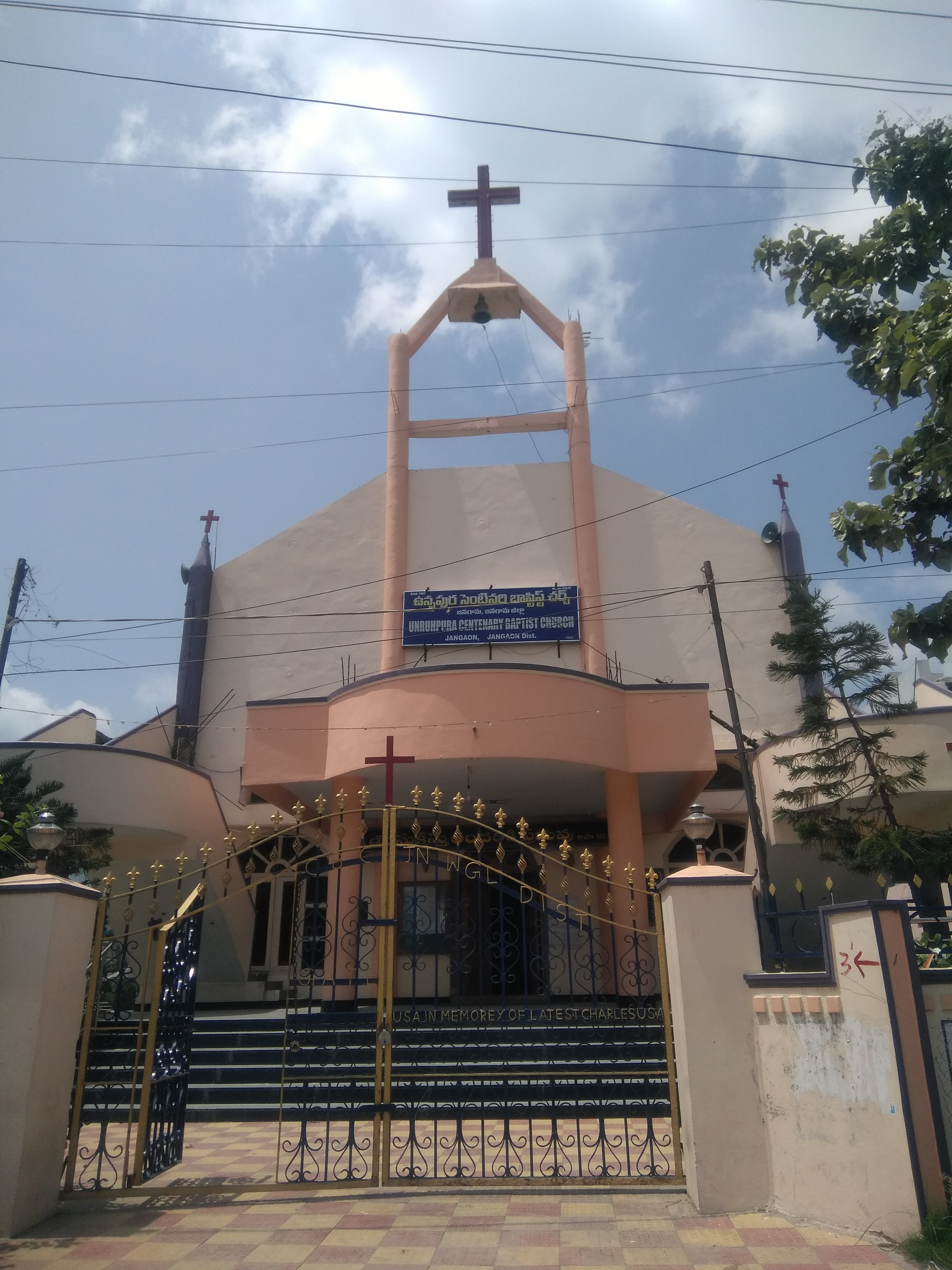
STBC-Unruhpura Centenary Baptist Church in Jangaon; N. Thomas pastored this Church between 1975 and 1984.

In the latter half of the 1970s, Thomas was assigned a pastoral role at the STBC-Unruhpura Centenary Baptist Church in Jangaon, where he served for a decade from 1975 to 1984.

In the 1990s, after Old Testament scholar Gaddala Solomon stepped down as pastor of the STBC-Centenary Baptist Church, there was an intermittent gap, temporarily filled by Pastor P. Jyothi Solomon (STBC). During this time, the church leadership in Secunderabad felt the need for a strong and dedicated pastor, eventually considering Thomas for the role.

In 1991, Thomas moved from Jangaon to Secunderabad to take on the pastoral leadership of the church. Under his guidance, the church grew steadily, with Thomas working closely with its leadership to provide much-needed support for spiritual development and expanding its missions across the twin cities and beyond.

Thomas’s pastorate in Secunderabad coincided with the archbishopric of Samineni Arulappa, Marampudi Joji, and Thumma Bala.

The Kuki people have acknowledged the efforts of the leadership at Centenary Baptist Church and Pastor Thomas in providing a space for their worship in the Kuki language. As pastor, Thomas also advocated strongly for youth development, leading to an all-India youth gathering in Secunderabad in 1992. This event eventually transformed into the Baptist Youth Fellowship, India.

Religious titles
Preceded by The Rev. P. Jyothi Solomon, STBC; 1988–1991	Pastor, STBC-Centenary Baptist Church, Clock Tower, Secunderabad; 1991–2015	Succeeded by The Rev. T. Ephraim, STBC; 1993–2018
Honorary titles
Preceded by	Associate General Secretary, Samavesam of Telugu Baptist Churches; 1984–1991	Succeeded by
Academic offices
Preceded by B. Victor Emmanuel	Member, Board of Governors; Andhra Christian Theological College; Secunderabad; 1984–1991	Succeeded by
