= Gaddala Solomon =

Indian religious scholar (1910–1993)

President G. Solomon, STBC Ayyagaru
- The Reverend
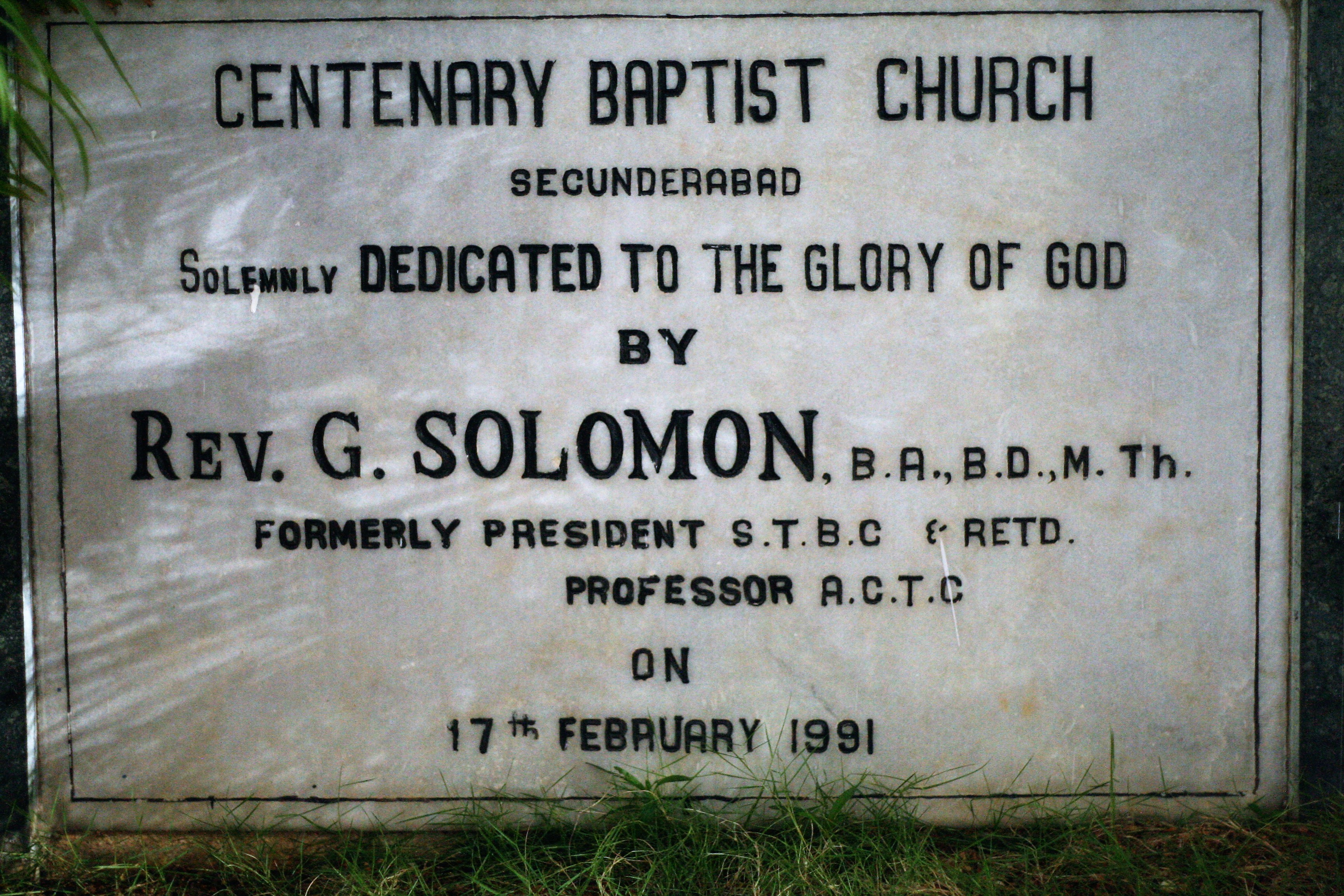
- Church: Samavesam of Telugu Baptist Churches Society
- In office: 1978–1982
- Previous posts: Parish Priest, STBC-Centenary Baptist Church, Secunderabad (1977-1986); Lecturer, Andhra Christian Theological College, Secunderabad (1973-1977); Lecturer, STBC-Ramayapatnam Baptist Theological Seminary, Ramayapatnam (1958-1972); Parish Priest, STBC-Waterbury Memorial Telugu Baptist Church, Chennai (1951-1957)

Orders
- Ordination: by American Baptist Foreign Mission Society
- Rank: Baptist Priest

Personal details
- Born: Gaddala Solomon; 28 December 1910 Ramayapatnam, Madras Presidency, India
- Died: 6 February 1993 (aged 82) Secunderabad, Andhra Pradesh (1956–2014), India
- Buried: Baptist Cemetery, Bhoiguda, Secunderabad
- Denomination: Christianity
- Parents: Smt. Alice-amma (Mother) and Sri David (Father)
- Occupation: Priesthood
- Education: B.A. Mathematics (Andhra), B.D. (Serampore), Th.M. (Eastern)
- Alma mater: AELC-Andhra Christian College, Guntur (Andhra Pradesh); United Theological College, Bangalore (Karnataka); Palmer Theological Seminary, King of Prussia (United States)

G. Solomon (28 December 1910 – 6 February 1993) was an Old Testament Scholar and a Baptist Patriarch hailing from the Protestant Samavesam of Telugu Baptist Churches Society (an affiliate member of the Baptist World Alliance and the National Council of Churches in India) and led it as its President during the years 1978-1982 overseeing the spiritual affairs of the Church Society whose ecclesiastical jurisdiction comprises the three states of Tamil Nadu, Andhra Pradesh and Telangana with 873 Churches comprising nearly a million members per present statistics.

== Contribution ==
=== Comparative analysis ===
In 1957, Solomon made a comparative analysis of suffering as viewed in two ancient scriptures, one from the Ancient Near East and the other from the Indian subcontinent where he provides the respective literature on suffering in both the scriptures, its genesis and outlook and some common insights between the two, particularly on retribution (see Klaus Koch (1955): Is there a Doctrine of Retribution in the Old Testament). Solomon highlights the example of Job (biblical figure) where the sufferer endures it with the thought of a glimmer of hope some day or the other reposing unflinching trust in God. Old Testament Scholars down the line have drawn parallels on Prophet Job and Raja Satya Harishchandra providing scholarly insights into the problem of suffering endured by these two legends and how they overcame it for a cause. A chronological analysis of the comparative literature on the problem of suffering in addition to the one by Solomon, reveals that John Bowker came out with Problems of Suffering in Religions of the World in 1970 where suffering as viewed by the diverse religions of the world has been presented. Later, in 1979, the Pune-based inquisitive Chemical engineers of the National Chemical Laboratory namely S. Prabhakara Rao and M. Prakasa Reddy came out with Job and His Satan - Parallels in Indian Scripture which was published in the German Old Testament scholarly journal, ZAW. A couple of years' later, David J. A. Clines came out with a research paper entitled In Search of the Indian Job where he provides a century of scholarly research on Job and Raja Satya Harishchandra that appeared in the Vetus Testamentum. Later in 1998, a Scholar at the St. Peter's Pontifical Seminary, Bangalore studying under Anthony Raymond Ceresko and Gnana Robinson researched specifically on Job and Harishchandra focusing on the problem of suffering.

Solomon's research brought out the many facets of suffering where his scholarship is profoundly visible as he sheaves through the views on suffering in the Old Testament as he quotes from the Pentateuch and the other books of the Old Testament with a comprehensive bibliography but the conclusions that he drew are an eye opener for those viewing suffering as a reason of our own follies. In the final analysis, Solomon looks into the possibilities of a more humane understanding of suffering overcoming Dogma and providing for repentance or rather an opportunity to set right the past and move forward. Solomon wrote, The solution of the problem of suffering in Christianity is that God also suffers along with the sufferer and helps him to endure it for His glory.

Solomon's work could best be understood if one were to look at a 1990 work entitled Wisdom tradition and the Indian Parallels with special reference to Telugu literature by the Old Testament Scholar, G. Babu Rao, who writes,

(Adapted) Our study of Old Testament will be more interesting and more constructive if we identify as many parallels as we can in the Indian culture and literature. The goal of our digging into our cultural heritage and relating it to the biblical traditions is to promote goodwill towards our fellow humans and to work together for the welfare of the people in relation to the nature and to our Creator, in order that all humans may be successful in achieving mastery of life.

=== Old Testament teaching ===
As an Old Testament Teacher, Solomon first taught at the Ramayapatnam Baptist Theological Seminary, Ramayapatnam from 1958 to 1972 during the Principalships of The Rev. Maurice Blanchard and The Rev. Louis F. Knoll. Subsequently in 1962, the seminary was affiliated to the Senate of Serampore College (University), India's first University making the seminary become the first B.D.-level institution in Andhra Pradesh to be affiliated with the University.

In the 1970s, Ecumenism brought together the different seminaries in Andhra Pradesh and Telangana with the starting of the near-ecumenical Andhra Christian Theological College in the year 1964 by the Baptists (CBCNC), the Lutherans (AELC, SALC), the Methodists (MCI) and the Anglicans, Congregationalists and the Wesleyans (CSI). Solomon's Church Society, the Samavesam of Telugu Baptist Churches was already running a seminary with English as a medium of instruction with Serampore affiliation for its B.D. whereas the new near-ecumenical venture offered L.Th. courses in Telugu as a medium of instruction.

However, two years' later, the Ramayapatnam Baptist Theological Seminary through the efforts of both The Rev. Maurice Blanchard as well as The Rev. Louis F. Knoll in 1967, with the cooperation of the Convention of Baptist Churches of Northern Circars who sent their learned faculty comprising W. G. Carder began to function as a separate entity together with the within the campus of the newly-formed near-ecumenical Andhra Christian Theological College at its erstwhile location in Rajahmundry, giving an unprecedented impetus to the new near-ecumenical venture as the inclusion of the Ramayapatnam Seminary meant higher level theological education as well as English as the medium of instruction and also the availability of the well-trained faculty of the Ramayapatnam Seminary comprising Solomon, Suppogu Joseph, Louis F. Knoll, P. Joseph, K. Wilson and others who moved from Ramayapatnam to Rajahmundry to take up B.D. classes teaching alongside the faculty of Andhra Christian Theological College which was then entitled to offer only Licentiate in Theology courses. By 1972, Louis F. Knoll along with W. P. Peery led the integration of the B.D. section of the Ramayapatnam Baptist Theological Seminary into the Andhra Christian Theological College before it moved in 1973 to its present location in Secunderabad.

== Studies ==
After general studies at the AELC-Andhra Christian College, Guntur leading to Bachelor of Arts in Mathematics under the Andhra University in 1934, Solomon took up work at the Buckingham and Carnatic Mills in Chennai but a decade later, discerned his avocation towards priesthood and much like the early Church Father, Saint Ambrose of Milan, Solomon relinquished civil work at Chennai and took to priesthood.

=== Graduate ===
By 1949, Solomon enrolled at the Protestant Regional Theologiate - the United Theological College, Bangalore for spiritual studies during the Principalship of Max Hunter Harrison, the College's first Old Testament Teacher and studied until 1952 for the three year Bachelor of Divinity course. Solomon's companions who were studying at the College at varying intervals included, D. J. Ambalavanar, N. D. Ananda Rao Samuel, V. C. Samuel, Victor Premasagar, E. C. John, Bobbili Prabhudass and others.

During the ensuing convocation of the Senate of Serampore College (University) held in 1953, Solomon was awarded a Bachelor of Divinity during the Registrarship of The Rev. W. W. Winfield.

=== Postgraduate ===
During 1956-1957, Solomon was sent for postgraduate studies to the Eastern Baptist Theological Seminary, King of Prussia, Pennsylvania, where he specialized in Old Testament and Biblical Hebrew language under the guidance of Edward R. Dalglish, Carl H. Morgan, and Walter B. S. Davis. By 1957, Solomon's research with the title, The Concept of Suffering in the Bible and Hinduism was published by the seminary leading to the award of Master of Theology in Old Testament.

Solomon's research work was translated into Telugu and published in 1964 with the title, Images in Suffering (Telugu: బాధయొక్క భావఛిత్రణము) that also appeared in 1993 in the compilation entitled Bibliography of Original Christian Writings in India in Telugu published by the Board of Theological Education of the Senate of Serampore College (BTESSC). Solomon was among the first in India to have specialized in the Old Testament in the 1950s with the others being K. V. Mathew, Rene Van de Walle, and E. C. John, all of whom were distinguished members of the Society for Biblical Studies in India.

=== Specialized studies in Hebrew ===
During 1972-1973, Solomon again joined his alma mater, the United Theological College, Bangalore during the Principalship of the Systematic Theologian, Joshua Russell Chandran to study for a Biblical Hebrew language refresher course studying under the Old Testament Scholars, E. C. John and G. M. Butterworth, the former being a direct student of Old Testament's Master Specialists, Gerhard von Rad and Claus Westermann at the University of Heidelberg, Germany.

Solomon's companions at the College during 1972-1973 included Johanna Rose Ratnavathi, Florence, Nirmala Kumari, Eleanor, D. Dhanaraj, John Sadananda, J. W. Gladstone, Sydney Salins, Christopher Asir, P. Surya Prakash and others hailing from the graduate section, while D. S. Satyaranjan, Nitoy Achümi, Timotheas Hembrom, G. Babu Rao, Basil Rebera and S. J. Theodore hailed from the postgraduate section.

== Ecclesiastical Ministry ==
=== Pastoral ===
==== 1951-1957: Tamil Nadu ====
Solomon first served as a Pastor at the Waterbury Memorial Telugu Baptist Church in Perambur in suburban Chennai during 1951-1957 till he embarked on an overseas sojourn for his postgraduate studies.

==== 1977-1986: Telangana ====
While teaching at the Andhra Christian Theological College, Solomon was recalled by the Samavesam of Telugu Baptist Churches in 1977 to take up ministerial duties at the STBC-Centenary Baptist Church, Secunderabad in 1977. Solomon pastored the Church for nearly a decade until 1986 when he voluntarily resigned from the ministerial functions of the Church citing health reasons much like the present Pope Benedict XVI.

=== Teaching ===
==== 1958-1972: Andhra Pradesh ====
When Solomon returned from the United States in 1958, he took up teaching of the Old Testament at the Ramayapatnam Baptist Theological Seminary, Ramayapatnam and later affiliated to the Senate of Serampore College (University) in 1962. Subsequently, in 1967, the B.D. section of the Seminary moved to Rajahmundry and was housed within the premises of the newly-founded Andhra Christian Theological College in Rajahmundry until it fully integrated into the Andhra Christian Theological College in 1972 by Louis F. Knoll and later shifted to Secunderabad in 1973. Solomon's students at Ramayapatnam and Rajahmundry included the Church historian Ravela Joseph, the New Testament Scholar Suppogu Joseph, Bishop Emeritus T. S. Kanaka Prasad, S. E. Krupa Rao, B. J. Christie Kumar and others.

==== 1973-1977: Telangana ====
In 1973, Solomon moved to the Andhra Christian Theological College which by then had shifted in its entirety from Rajahmundry to Secunderabad and taught Old Testament and Biblical Hebrew language to aspirants hailing from the Anglican, Baptist, Congregational, Lutheran, Methodist, Pentecostal, Wesleyan and other small and indigenous Church Societies. Solomon's other teaching colleagues included the Cantabrigian Victor Premasagar, the Wisconsin University-Scholar, R. R. Sundara Rao, the New Testament Scholar, Muriel Spurgeon Carder, the Religions Scholars, Eric J. Lott, W. P. Peery, the Systematic Theologians, Ryder Devapriam, R. Yesurathnam and others coinciding with the teaching tenures of Gali Bali, John Wijngaards and others at the St. John's Regional Seminary, the Catholic Regional Theologiate. By 1977, Solomon had to leave the College as his Church Society recalled him and assigned ministerial duties at the local Church in Secunderabad and was succeeded by The Rev. G. Babu Rao, a Teacher - in - Old Testament at Serampore College, Serampore.

Among Solomon's students during that period included Alexander John, CSI, T. Punnaiah, STBC, L. Samuel John, AELC, D. Vasantha Rao, CBCNC, K. C. Martin, CSI, Bishop Emeritus A. Rajarathnam, CSI, and others.

== Reminisce ==
Talathoti Punnaiah, who was an aspirant at the Ramayapatnam Baptist Theological Seminary in Ramayapatnam during 1969 in his memoir titled My Memoir, Ministry and Message writes,

A well educated senior Professor and Preacher, well versed in the Bible - he was an Old Testament Professor.

Religious titles
Preceded by The Rev. William Carey, STBC	Pastor, STBC-Waterbury Memorial; Telugu Baptist Church, Chennai; 1951-1957	Succeeded by The Rev. K. Joseph, STBC
Preceded by The Rev. K. Devadanam STBC	Pastor, STBC-Centenary Baptist Church, Secunderabad; 1977 - 1986	Succeeded by The Rev. N. Thomas, STBC
Academic offices
Preceded by The Rev. P. Victor Premasagar, CSI	Teacher - in - Old Testament, Andhra Christian Theological College, Secunderabad; 1973 - 1977	Succeeded by The Rev. G. Babu Rao, CBCNC
