= Centenary Baptist Church Secunderabad =

Coordinates: 17°26′24.47″N 78°29′58.33″E

STBC-Centenary Baptist Church
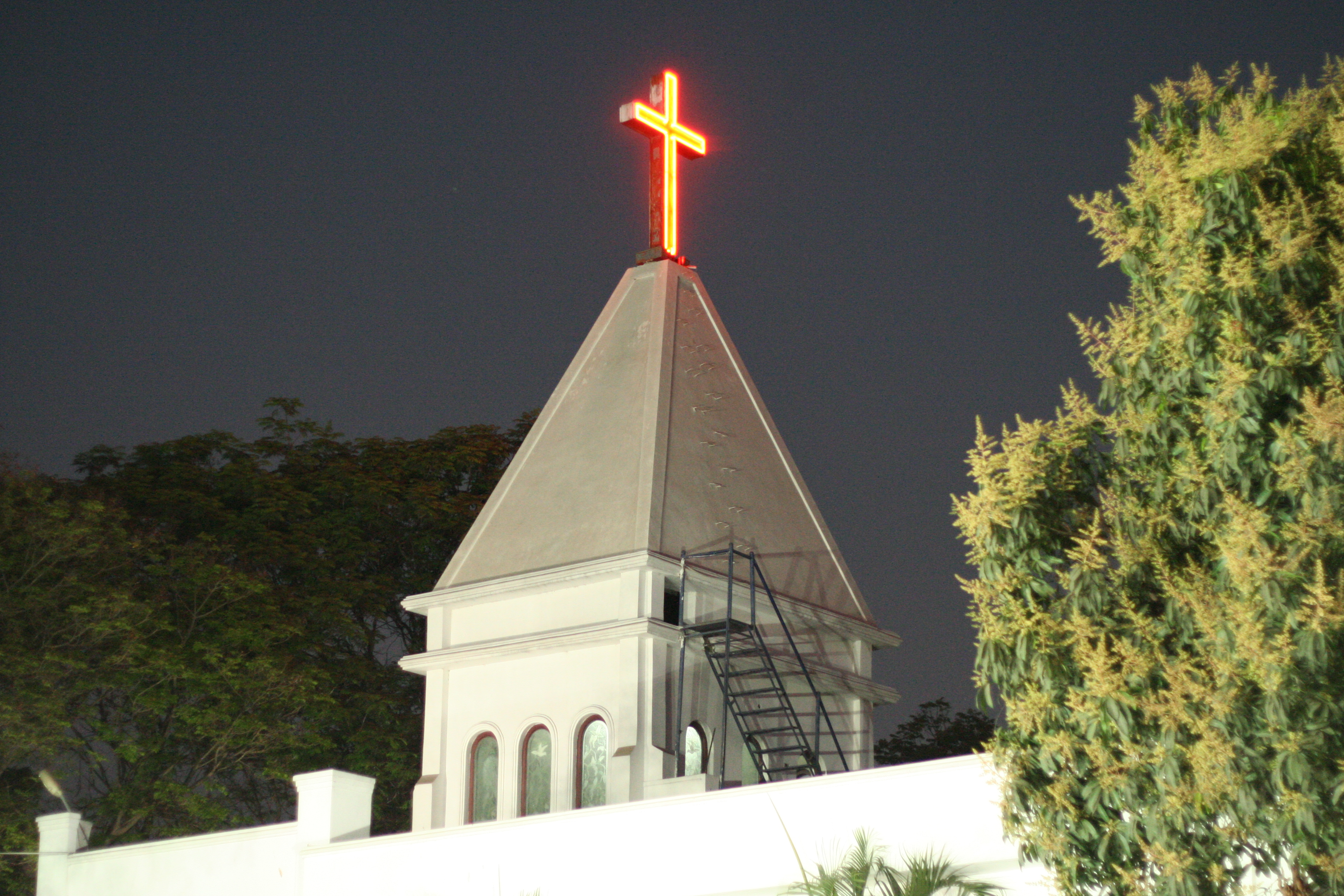
- STBC-Centenary Baptist Church
- Location: Secunderabad
- Address: St. Mary's Road, Near Clock Tower, Secunderabad 500 003, Telangana
- Country: India
- Denomination: Baptist
- Tradition: Protestant
- Churchmanship: Low church

History
- Founded: 14 November 1874
- Founder: American Baptist Foreign Mission Society

Architecture
- Functional status: Active
- Architectural type: Modern architecture

Specifications
- Capacity: 2000

Administration
- Diocese: Deccan Association of Samavesam of Telugu Baptist Churches (STBC)

Pastoral Team
STBC-Centenary Baptist Church,
Secunderabad, Telangana

- 2003– The Rev. M. Purshotham, STBC, B.D. (Serampore),
- 2014– The Rev. B. Charles Theodore, STBC,
- 2022– The Rev. V. Elia, STBC, B.D. (Serampore),
- 2022– The Rev. V. Satyaranjan, STBC,
- 2023– The Rev. Pramodgiri, STBC,
- 2024– The Rev. G. James Zachariah, STBC

STBC-Centenary Baptist Church Secunderabad is a Baptist Church in the city of Secunderabad, India which was established in 1875 by the American Baptist Foreign Mission Society (ABM) and was later led by the Samavesam of Telugu Baptist Churches (STBC) through the Deccan Association. STBC-Centenary Baptist Church has a current membership of more than 3000. The original older structure and a new centenary structure built in 1991 exist side by side in the same premises. Worship services are only held in the new sanctuary. The church conducts worship in Telugu, English, Hindi and Manipuri.

== History ==
The church was established on 14 November 1875 by American Baptist Foreign Mission Society led by The Rev. W. W. Campbell, ABM, a Baptist missionary. The first member of the congregation was Richard B. Clayburn, who was baptized on 5 December 1875. The first native Pastor Bezwada Paul, STBC was appointed in 1895. The foundation stone for the existing new church structure was laid by The Rev. Louis F. Knoll, ABM on 14 November 1975 during the ministry of The Rev. K. Devadanam, STBC, exactly 100 years after the first structure was built. The church was appropriately named STBC-Centenary Baptist Church. The groundbreaking however took place five years later, in 1980. The new sanctuary was completed and consecrated by the Old Testament scholar The Rev. G. Solomon, STBC on 17 February 1991. It took more than ten years to build the existing structure.

The church now operates 35 branch churches and 15 gospel centers in around the cities of Secunderabad and Hyderabad.

== Architecture ==
The old church is a simple Gothic structure whereas the new church is a modern structure incorporating several elements of traditional church architecture such as Gothic styled windows. A two storied bell tower forms the facade of the church.

== Programmes ==
The Church has been witness to many programmes, some of them which etched in the History of Christianity in India.

=== 1978: Visit of evangelist Billy Graham ===
In 1978, during the tenure of The Rev. G. Solomon, STBC, the global evangelist Billy Graham visited Secunderabad and the STBC-Centenary Baptist Church hosted many of the programmes forming many committees and volunteers, including The Rev. J. Chiranjeevi of the Seva Bharat. Among the ecclesiastical personalities who took part in the one-day crusade in Secunderabad included Archbishop, S. Arulappa, RCM and the Old Testament Scholar Victor Premasagar, CSI, then Principal of the near-ecumenical Andhra Christian Theological College.

=== 1999: Lambadi version of the Scriptures ===
On 25 October 1999 during the tenure of The Rev. N. Thomas, STBC, the Lambadi version of the New Testament was released here by the Bible Society of India in the presence of The Rev. G. Babu Rao, CBCNC, then Auxiliary Secretary of the Bible Society of India Andhra Pradesh Auxiliary, The Rev. G. D. V. Prasad, CSI, then Translations Director of the Bible Society of India and Mr. Bidyut Kumar Pramanik, the General Secretary of the Bible Society of India. The speakers lauded the efforts of the original translator, The Rev. B. E. Devaraj, CSI succeeded by The Rev. Lal Singh Lazarus, CSI.

Gallery

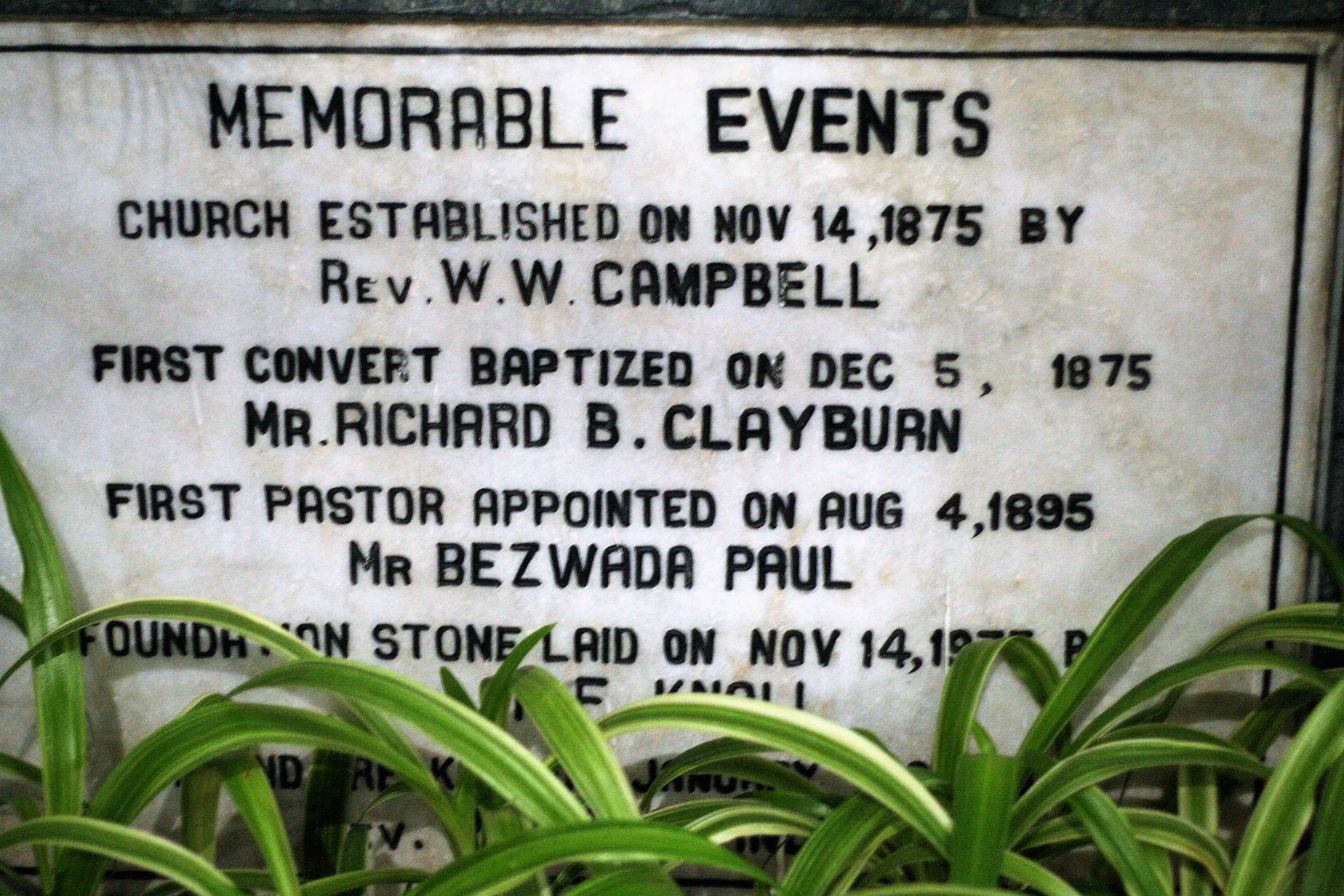
Tablet of historical events at the church

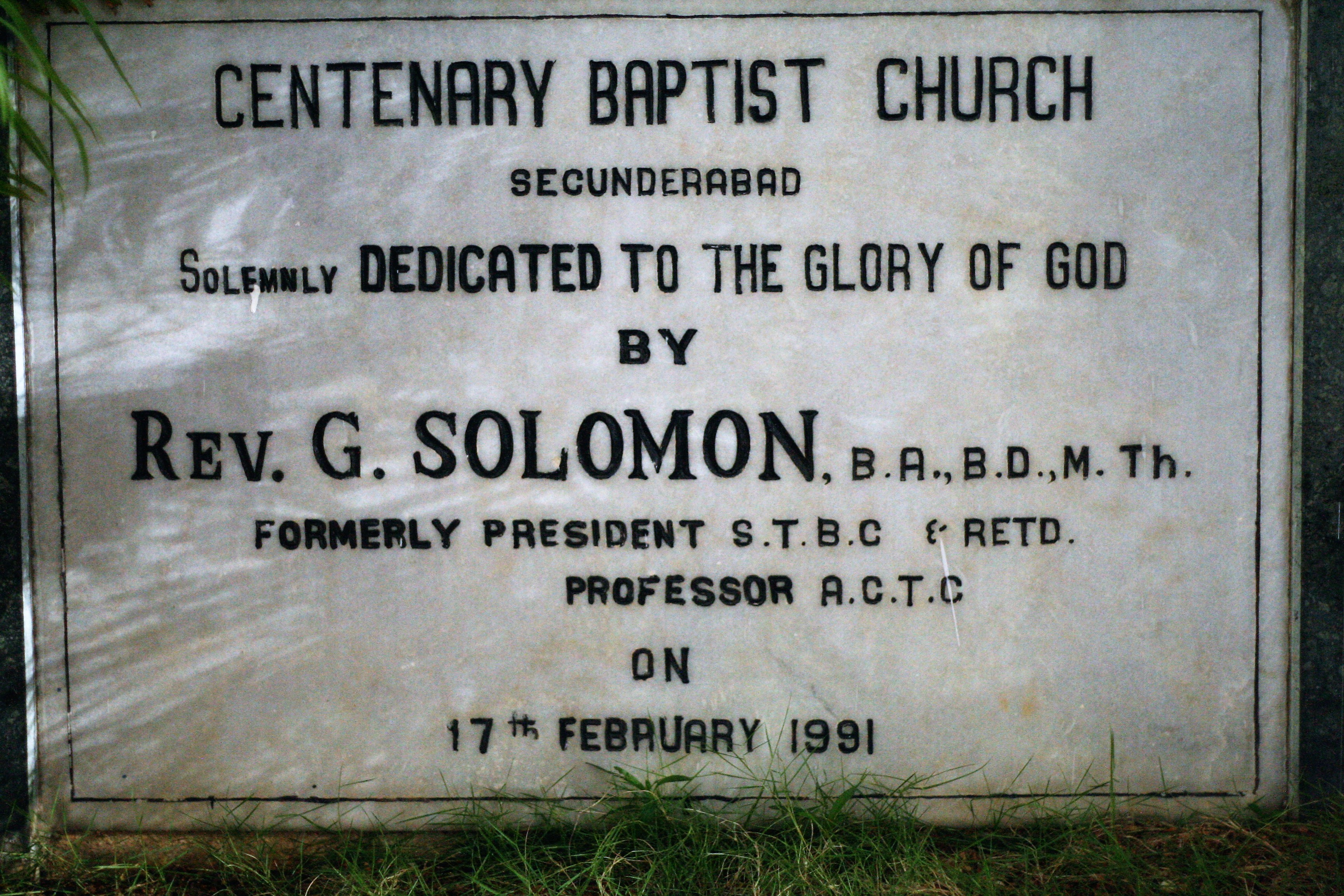
Renovation plaque inaugurated by G. Solomon on 17 February 1991

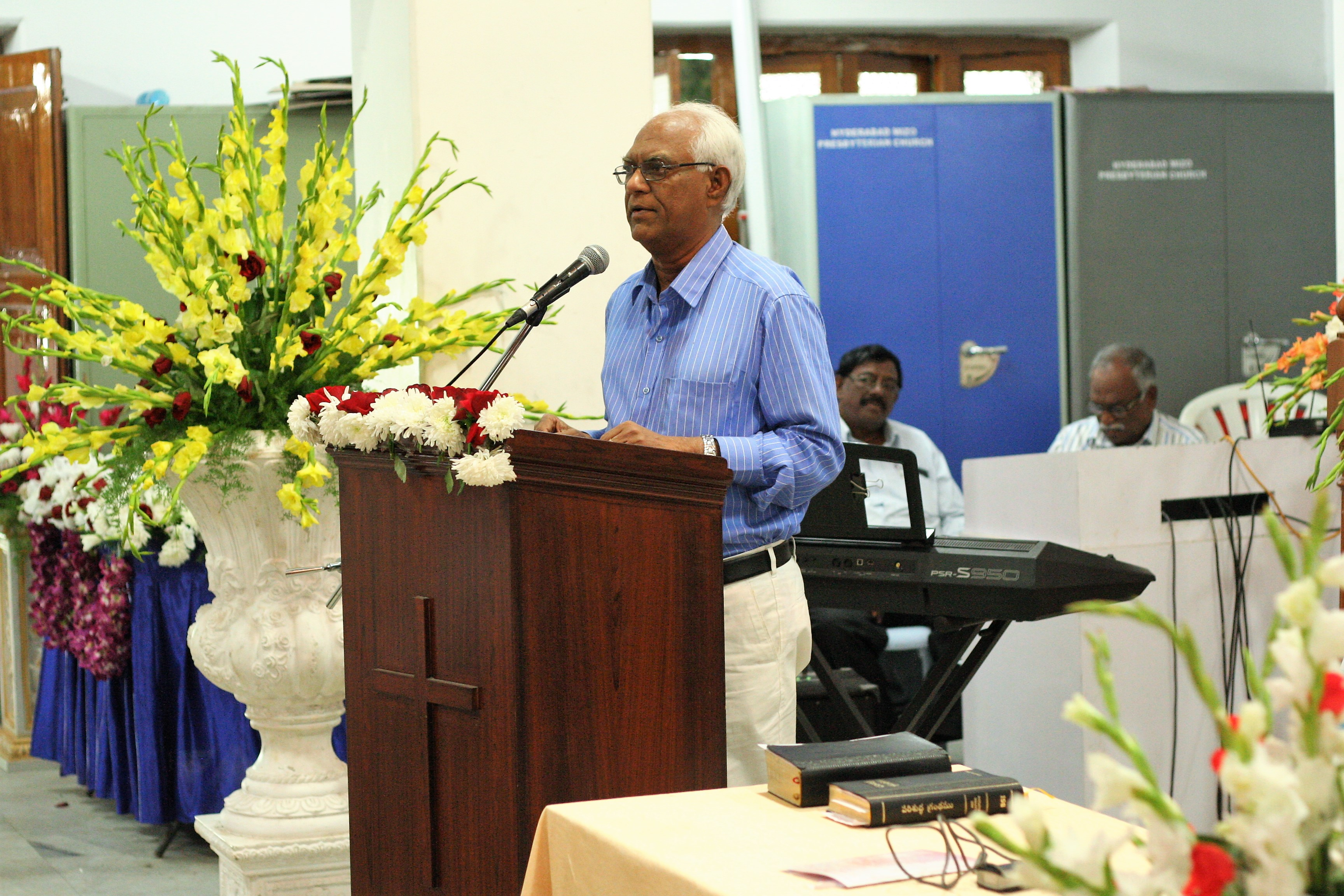
President Emeritus, D. Robert Surya Prakash, a banker by profession and Treasurer of the Telangana Council of Churches (affiliated to the National Council of Churches in India)

== Succession of pastors ==
The first pastor of the Church was The Rev. B. Paul in 1895. There have been pastors with scholarly aptitudes, The Rev. K. Wilson, The Rev. G. Solomon, and The Rev. A. John Prabhakar, three of whom were involved in ministerial formation of aspirants hailing from the Anglican, Baptist, Congregational, Lutheran, Methodist, Pentecostal, Wesleyan, and other small and indigenous church societies at near-ecumenical Andhra Christian Theological College. Senior Pastor, The Rev. N. Thomas, STBC, who had been ailing for a long time, died on 19 April 2021. He was born on 2 March 1946 in Nellutla near Jangaon and underwent Spiritual formation in Andhra Christian Theological College, Rajahmundry and later upgraded his studies in MCI-Leonard Theological College, Jabalpur and served as a Pastor of this Church from 1991. Funeral mass of Rev. Thomas was held at 12 noon on 20 April 2021 in Centenary Baptist Church, followed by a Burial mass at 15:00 hours at Baptist Cemetery in Bhoiguda, Secunderabad.

Succession of Pastors
Tenure	Name	Academics
1875-1888	The Rev. Woodley Williamson Campbell, ABM	Alumnus of Madison University, Gulfport, Mississippi
1883-1883	The Rev. Elbert Chute, ABM	Alumnus of Union Theological Seminary, Morgan Park, Illinois
1895-1897	The Rev. Bezawada Paul, STBC	Alumnus of Ramayapatnam Baptist Theological Seminary, Ramayapatnam
1897-1900	The Rev. William Bambrick Boggs, ABM	B.A. (Acadia), D.D.
1900-1901	The Rev. W. E. Hopkins, ABM	Alumnus of University of Chicago Divinity School, Chicago, Illinois
1901-1907	The Rev. Frank Howard Levering, ABM	B.Sc. (Chicago), LL.B. (SUNY Albany)
1907-1909	Pastor M. Ananda Rao, STBC	Alumnus of Ramayapatnam Baptist Theological Seminary, Ramayapatnam
1908-1908	The Rev. Nils Clarence Parsons, ABM	Alumnus of University of Chicago Divinity School, Chicago, Illinois
1909-1913	Pastor Albert M. Boggs, ABM	Alumnus of ANTS, Newton, Massachusetts
1913-1918	The Rev. Frank Howard Levering, ABM	B.Sc. (Chicago), LL.B. (SUNY Albany)
1919-1919	The Rev. Y. Purshotham, STBC	Alumnus of Ramayapatnam Baptist Theological Seminary, Ramayapatnam
1919-1928	The Rev. Frank Kurtz, ABM	Alumnus of Kalamazoo College, Kalamazoo, Michigan and University of Chicago, Chicago, Illinois
1920-1920	The Rev. Alvin Texas Fishman, ABM	B.Sc. and M.Sc. (UIC), B.A. (Chicago), Ph.D. (Yale)
1928-1936	The Rev. C. R. Marsh, ABM	
1936-1936	Dr. Charles Rothwell Manley, ABM	Ph.B. (Ottawa), M.D. (KU Med)
1938-1946	The Rev. G. C. Jacob, STBC	Alumnus of Ramayapatnam Baptist Theological Seminary, Ramayapatnam
1946-1952	Pastor D. R. Samuel, STBC	Alumnus of Ramayapatnam Baptist Theological Seminary, Ramayapatnam
1952-1956	The Rev. F. P. Manley, ABM	
1956-1957	Francis Peter, Laity	
1957-1963	The Rev. Ch. Prakasham, STBC	Alumnus of Ramayapatnam Baptist Theological Seminary, Ramayapatnam
1963-1966	The Rev. Kothapalli Wilson, STBC	B.D. (Serampore), M.A., (Osmania), Th.M. (Duke), Ph.D. (Syracuse)
1966-1977	The Rev. Karra Devadanam, STBC	
1977-1988	The Rev. Gaddala Solomon, STBC	B.A. Mathematics (Andhra), B. D. (Serampore), Th.M. (Eastern),
1988-1991	The Rev. P. Jyothi Solomon, STBC	
1991-2015	The Rev. Nalla Thomas, STBC	L. Th. and B. D. (Serampore)
1993-2018	The Rev. Thonta Ephraim, STBC	B. D. (Serampore)
2011-2014	The Rev. G. James Zachariah, STBC	
2022-2022	The Rev. Anuparthy John Prabhakar, STBC	B.A. (Nagarjuna), B. D., M. Th., and D. Th. (Serampore)

== See also ==
- List of churches in Secunderabad and Hyderabad
- Secunderabad Clock Tower
