= William Powlas Peery =

Pastor of the Andhra Evangelical Lutheran Church

- Born: May 21, 1922; Hickory, North Carolina, U.S.
- Died: January 20, 2000; Alamance County, North Carolina, U.S.
- Parent(s): John Carnahan Peery and Pearle Miller (Powlas) Peery
- Church: Evangelical Lutheran Church in America, North America
- Ordained: September 30, 1945 by the South Carolina Synod of the ELCA
- Writings: The church and its ministry as seen by Lutherans and the Church of South India, Vanderbilt University, 1959. A Christian understanding of south Indian Vaishnavism, Duke University, 1972. A Lutheran Understanding of Worship and Liturgy: basic principles and present concerns, Gurukul, Madras, 1983, The place of Mary in the Lutheran Church, Gurukul, Madras, 1983.
- Congregations served: Tumrukota Parish of West Guntur Synod, Andhra Evangelical Lutheran Church (1946-1951)
- Offices held: Executive Director, Inter-Church Service Agency, Egmore, Madras (1969-1970)
- Title: The Reverend Doctor

William Powlas Peery (May 21, 1922 – January 20, 2000) was a Pastor of the Evangelical Lutheran Church in America/Andhra Evangelical Lutheran Church who taught theology at ecumenical institutions, the Andhra Christian Theological College at its erstwhile location in Rajahmundry and also at the United Theological College, Bangalore both of which are affiliated to the nation's first University, the Senate of Serampore College (University), Serampore.

Peery was in India from 1945 through 1987 laying the foundation for ecumenical ventures, especially his role at the Andhra Christian Theological College in overseeing the merger of the Ramayapatnam Baptist Theological Seminary in 1967 as well as involving himself in the negotiations on Lutheran dialogue with the Church of South India. Peery was a member of the Church of South India-Lutheran Inter-Church Commission. During the third meeting of the Commission called for by the chairmen, Rajah B. Manikam and Hospet Sumitra that was convened by the Secretary Joshua Russell Chandran on 8 and 9 January 1963 at the United Theological College, Bangalore, Peery presented a comparative analysis of the constitutions of the Lutheran and the Church of South India Societies. After the conclusion of the third Inter-Church Commission, Peery was made Convenor of a Committee to come up with two drafts relating to the importance of episcopy, one on episcopal basis and the other partly-episcopal and partly non-episcopal.

Peery also took part in Lutheran-Oriental Orthodox negotiations where he came up with two papers on Lutheran perspectives entitled, A Lutheran Understanding of Worship and Liturgy: basic principles and present concerns and The place of Mary in the Lutheran Church.

== Studies ==
=== Graduate studies ===
Peery studied arts at the Newberry College, Newberry, South Carolina taking a graduate degree in arts leading to Bachelor of Arts (B.A.) in 1943. During his college days at Newberry, Peery seemed to be involved in organising Luther League

After discerning his avocation towards priesthood, he studied spirituality at the Lutheran Theological Southern Seminary in Columbia, South Carolina which in 1945 awarded him a graduate degree in divinity, Bachelor of Divinity (B. D.).

=== Post-graduate studies ===
In 1957, Peery took study leave and studied for the postgraduate degree of Master of Arts (M.A.) specialising in Religions at the Vanderbilt University, Nashville where he submitted a thesis entitled The church and its ministry as seen by Lutherans and the Church of South India under the supervision of Professor J. Robert Nelson.

=== Doctoral studies ===
After Peery's stint as an Administrator at the ecumenical Inter-Church Service Agency, he enrolled as a doctoral candidate at the Duke University, Durham, North Carolina and submitted a dissertation entitled A Christian understanding of south Indian Vaishnavism enabling the university to award a Doctor of Philosophy degree in 1972.

== Ecclesiastical career ==
=== Pastoral and Teaching ===
From 1945 onwards, Peery was a Missionary and Member of the Council of India Mission of the Evangelical Lutheran Church in America. In 1946 he was assigned the role of a Pastor to Tumrukota in Rentachintala Mandal of Guntur district where he served up to 1951. Peery was also involved in differently-abled development at Rentachintala where the Andhra Evangelical Lutheran Church Society established a school for the visually-impaired Peery was a member of the Committee for the Welfare of the Visually and the Hearing-Impaired under the auspices of the National Council of Churches in India (formerly the Christian Council of India and Pakistan).

Peery moved to Rajahmundry in East Godavari District and taught from 1952 through 1964 at the Lutheran Theological College, Rajahmundry until its merger into the newly formed ecumenical Andhra Christian Theological College which comprised the following ecclesiastical seminaries:

- The Lutheran Theological College, Rajahmundry,
- The Baptist Theological Seminary, Kakinada, and
- The Andhra Union Theological College, Dornakal.

Peery was then reassigned to teach at the new college from 1964 onwards at the Andhra Christian Theological College (ACTC). It was Peery who oversaw the inclusion of the Ramayapatnam Baptist Theological Seminary into the ACTC in 1967 when an Act of Integration was performed in the presence of the President of the Ramayapatnam Baptist Theological Seminary, Louis F. Knoll.

In 1971, Peery took up a Professorship at the United Theological College, Bangalore where he taught Religions along with then Professor G. D. Melanchthon. In 1985, Peery along with his other colleagues, Joshua Russell Chandran, J. G. F. Collison, R. Richer and Christopher Doraisingh presented a paper entitled The Concept of Baptism in the Judeo-Christian Tradition. After teaching Religions for nearly two decades at the United Theological College, Bangalore, Peery retired on account of superannuation in 1987.

=== Administrative ===
In 1969, Peery moved to Madras where he donned the mantle of an Administrator by taking up an administrative role at the ecumenical Inter Church Service Agency in Egmore, Madras where he served for a year before taking up doctoral studies at the Duke University.

Peery was a member of Council of India Mission of the United Lutheran Church in America and held the position as office bearer as vice-president from 1953 to 1955 and as president from 1959 to 1963, 1966–1969, and from 1973 to 1975.

== Recognition and honours ==
In 1966, the Lenoir–Rhyne University, Hickory, North Carolina conferred an honorary doctorate degree on Peery along with William Richard Fritz, Lestor C. Gifford, Franklin Clark Fry and Lewis Arthur Larson.

Religious titles
Preceded by -	Missionary Evangelist; Andhra Evangelical Lutheran Church; 1945-1987	Succeeded by
Academic offices
Preceded by -	Lecturer; Andhra Christian Theological College, Rajahmundry; 1966-1969	Succeeded by
Other offices
Preceded by -	Executive Director; Inter Church Service Agency, Madras; 1969-1970	Succeeded by
Academic offices
Preceded by G. D. Melanchthon	Professor; United Theological College, Bangalore; 1971-1987	Succeeded by
