= Christian Cemetery, Narayanguda =

Two cemeteries in Hyderabad, India

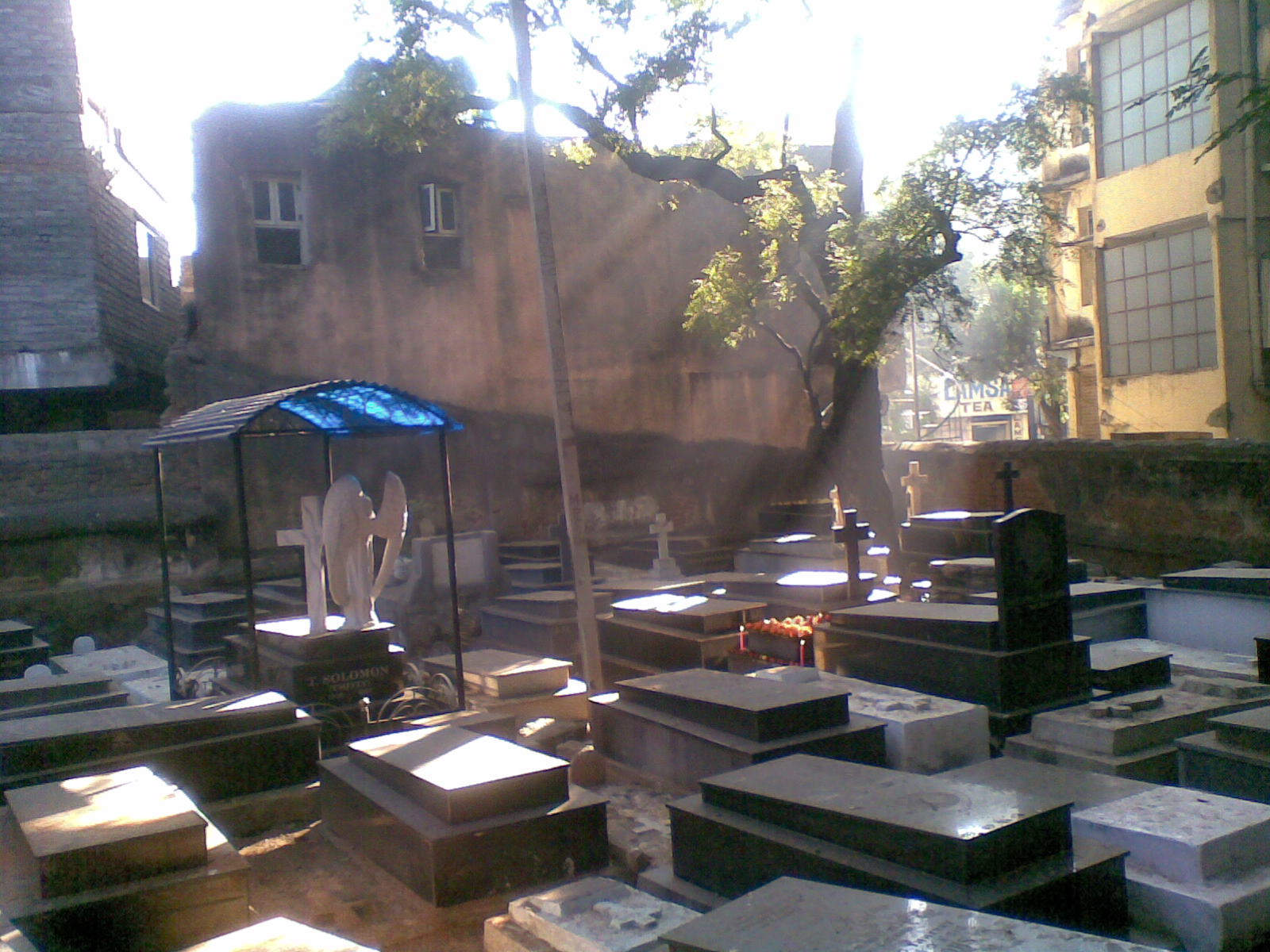
- inner view of cemetery
- Interactive map of Christian Cemetery, Narayanguda

Details
- Established
- Location: Narayanguda, Hyderabad, Andhra Pradesh
- Country: India
- Coordinates: 17.3963°N 78.4855°E

The Christian Cemetery at Narayanguda is one of the largest cemeteries located at Hyderabad, Telangana, India.

The cemetery is divided into two sections, namely Roman Catholic and Protestant, to accommodate people of the two different Christian denominations. More recently the older graves are being replaced by new ones due to lack of space for the newly dead, as even the government had refused to donate new land despite repeated requests. The cemetery pays its electricity bills in the name of Prophet Isaiah.

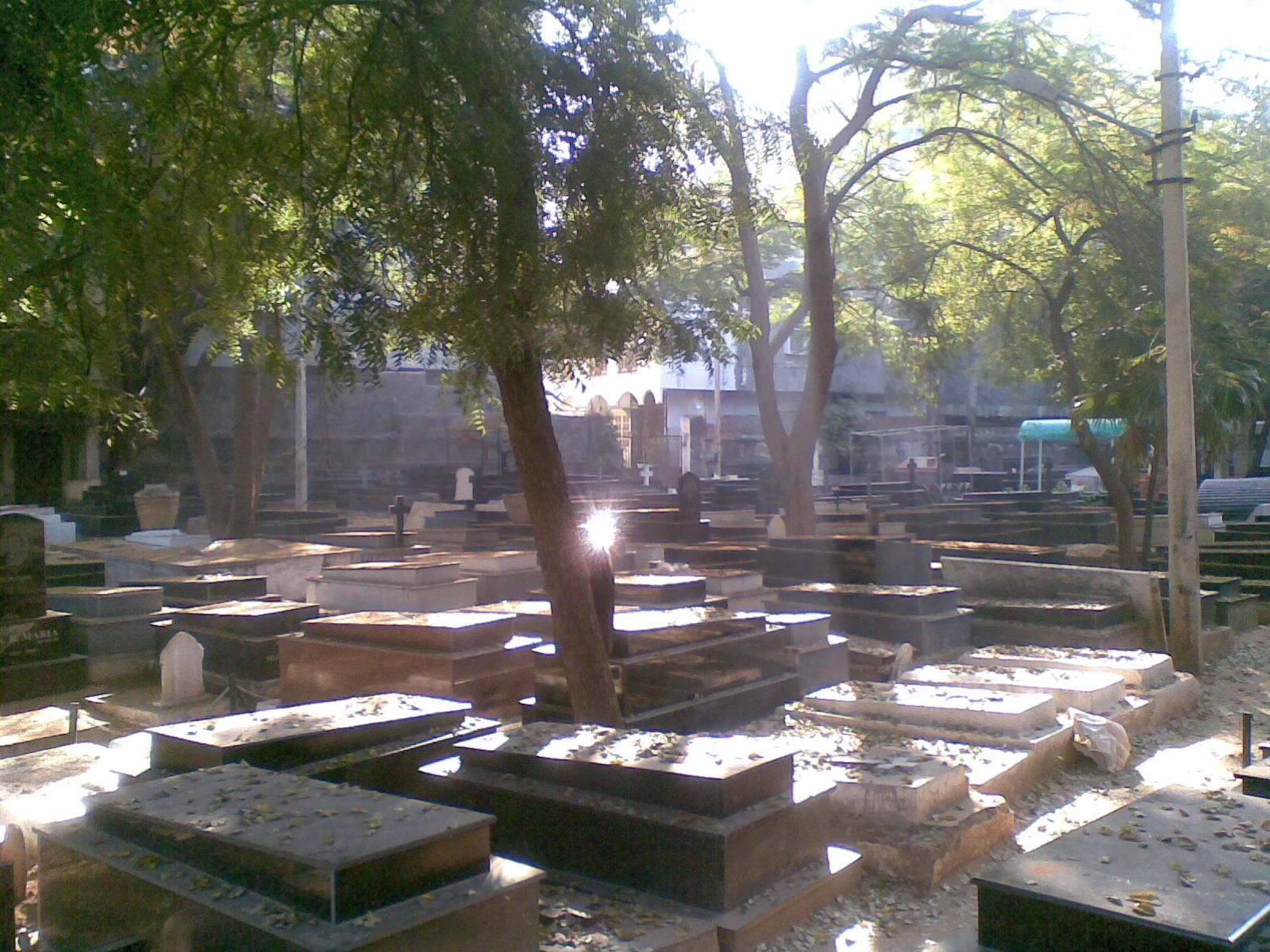
gravestones of various dead

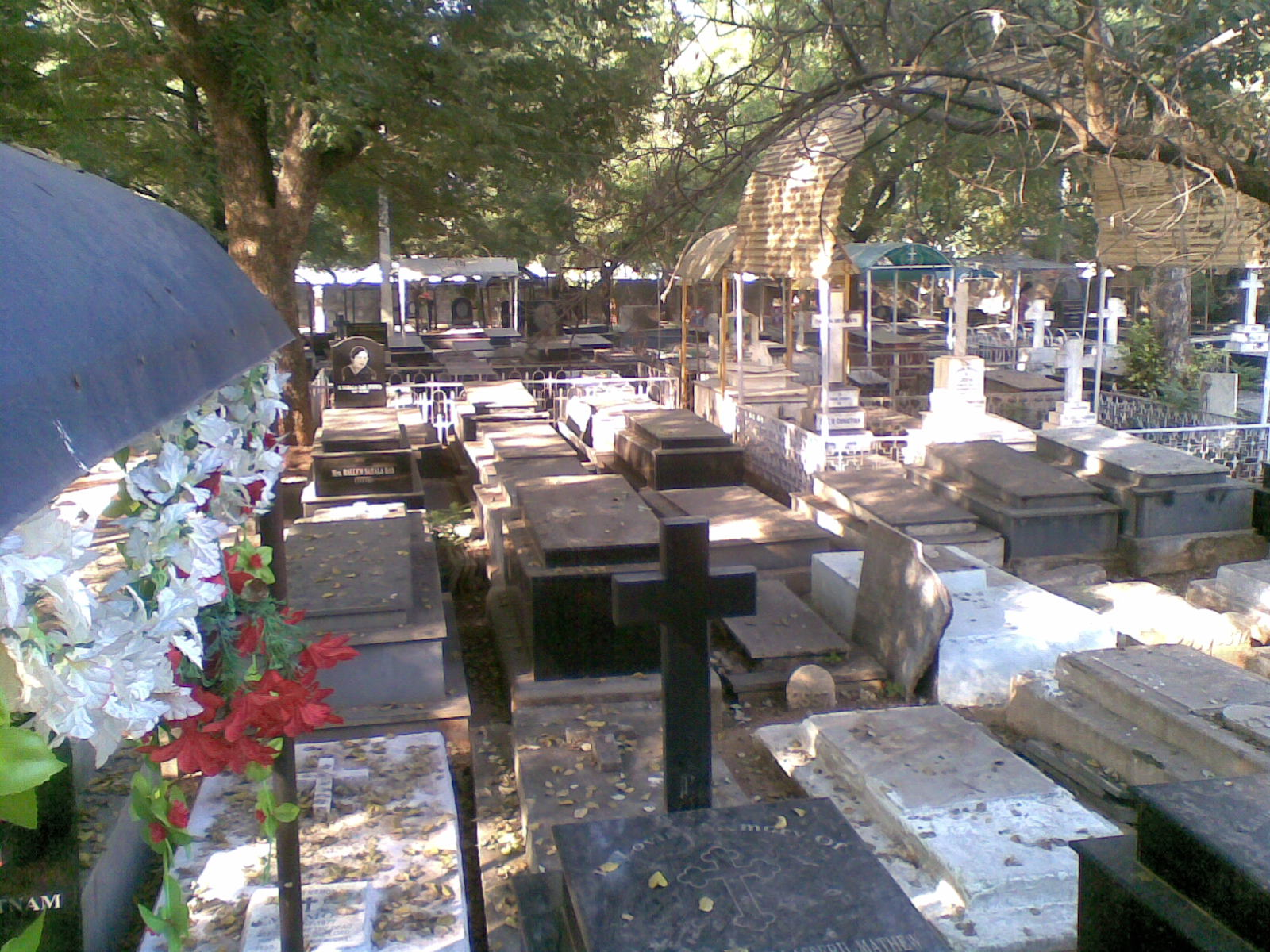
right side of the cemetery

== Notable burials ==
- Bakht Singh (1903–2000), Christian evangelist
- A. B. Masilamani (1914–1990), Baptist pastor and evangelist
