= Ramayapatnam Lighthouse =

Coordinates: 15°02′59″N 80°02′53″E

Ramayapatnam Lighthouse is a lighthouse in Ramayapatnam, Ulavapadu mandal, Prakasam district, Andhra Pradesh, India, on the Bay of Bengal. It comes under the control of central Government (Director General of Lighthouses and Lightships) under the Ministry of Ports, Shipping and Waterways, maintained by The Directorate of Lighthouses and Lightships, Visakhapatnam.

Ramayapatnam lighthouse is connected by 20 km road to Kavali railway station on the Chennai-Howrah trunk route. It is the first lighthouse provided at Ramayapatnam: a church built in 1870 at Ramayapatnam previously served as a landmark for the benefit of ships cruising off the Ramayapatnam coast. The lighthouse tower was built in 1982.
