= Suppogu Joseph =

The Reverend Suppogu Joseph, STBC
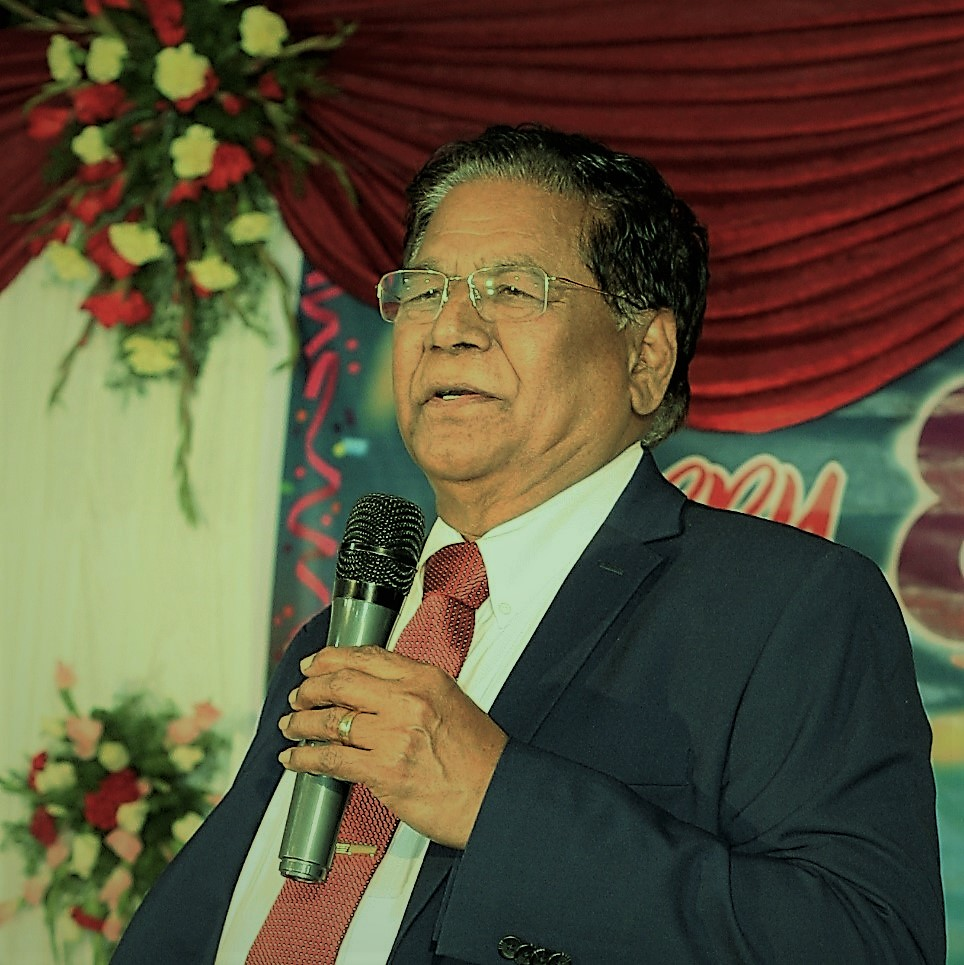
- Pastor Joseph on his 80th birthday on 1 January 2019 at the Protestant Regional Theologiate in Secunderabad
- Born: 1 January 1939 (age 87); Kurnool district, Madras Presidency (British Raj)
- Other name: SJ Ayyagaru
- Education: B.D., M.Th., D.Th. (Serampore)
- Alma mater: Ramayapatnam Baptist Theological Seminary, Ramayapatnam (Andhra Pradesh), Serampore College, Serampore (West Bengal), Gurukul Lutheran Theological College, Chennai, (Tamil Nadu), École Biblique, Jerusalem (Israel), Goethe Institute, Lüneburg (Germany), Lutheran Theological Seminary at Philadelphia (United States)
- Occupation: Priest
- Years active: 1964 - present
- Known for: New Testament Scholarship
- Parent: Sri S. Ranganna
- Religion: Christianity
- Church: Samavesam of Telugu Baptist Churches (STBC)
- Writings: 1990, Luke's Adaptation of the Gospel Tradition in Mark: A Synopsis; 2007, Adaptation of the Gospel tradition in Luke, 2009, Table fellowship of Jesus : according to Luke
- Congregations served: STBC-Waterbury Memorial Telugu Baptist Church, Chennai, Tamil Nadu (1964-1969), STBC-Centenary Baptist Church, Secunderabad, Telangana (1977)
- Offices held: Principal, Andhra Christian Theological College, Secunderabad, Telangana (1986-1990)
- Title: The Reverend

Suppogu Joseph (born 1 January 1939) is a Golden jubilee Pastor of the Protestant Samavesam of Telugu Baptist Churches with major contribution to New Testament scholarship with reference to Lukan literature. In a study on Luke in 2010 by Justin Alexandru undertaken at the University of Durham, Joseph's work has been cited by the researcher in the context of Authorship of Luke–Acts where Justin authoritatively attests the work of Joseph.

Joseph has been teaching New Testament and Biblical Greek Language since 1969 ever since his appointment as a Teacher at the Protestant Regional Theologiate and had also served as Principal of the Theologiate during 1986-1990 in Secunderabad, Telangana and is currently a member of the Council of the Senate of Serampore College (University), Serampore, West Bengal, India's first University under Section 2(f) of the University Grants Commission Act, 1956.

== Studies ==
Both the Catholic and Protestant missions propagated the gospel in Madras Presidency, it was the Protestant American Baptist Mission which inspired the Suppogu patriarchs in Kurnool district to Christ.

=== Graduate ===
After early studies up to the collegiate level, S. Joseph began to work at the Kurnool Medical College as an Assistant in the Forensic Medicine Department and after a year or so, his interest began to shift towards spirituality.

S. Joseph then approached the Samavesam of Telugu Baptist Churches who accepted his candidature and sent him for spiritual formation to a Major Seminary in Ramayapatnam, the Ramayapatnam Baptist Theological Seminary where he studied during the Principalship of The Rev. Maurice Blanchard and other faculty comprising The Rev. G. Solomon and others and earned a Licentiate in Theology (L. Th.). Later he upgraded his theological studies both at Serampore College, Serampore studying between 1963-1964 coinciding with the study period of D. S. Satyaranjan and continuing at Ramayapatnam earning a Bachelor of Divinity (B.D.) degree in 1965.

=== Post-graduate level research ===
In 1966, the Samavesam of Telugu Baptist Churches sent S. Joseph to the Serampore College, a constituent College of the Senate of Serampore College (University) where he mastered Biblical Greek Language and the New Testament making him eligible to teach at any University in the world in the Faculty of Theology.

S. Joseph studied at Serampore for postgraduate studies in 1966 during the Principalship of William Stewart where the New Testament and Biblical Greek Language Faculty comprised D. F. Hudson, E. L. Wenger, J. C. Hindley and M. P. John. Other faculty members at that time included the Old Testament Scholar K. V. Mathew, Religions Scholar, V. C. Samuel and the Sanskrit Teacher, Yisu Das Tiwari. S. Joseph's companions at the College included G. Babu Rao, James Massey, D. K. Mohanty who were in the graduate section. During the ensuing convocation of the University held in 1967/68, S. Joseph was awarded an M. Th. by the Registrar, C. Devasahayam ably assisted by then Administrative Officer, D. S. Satyaranjan.

=== Doctoral level research ===
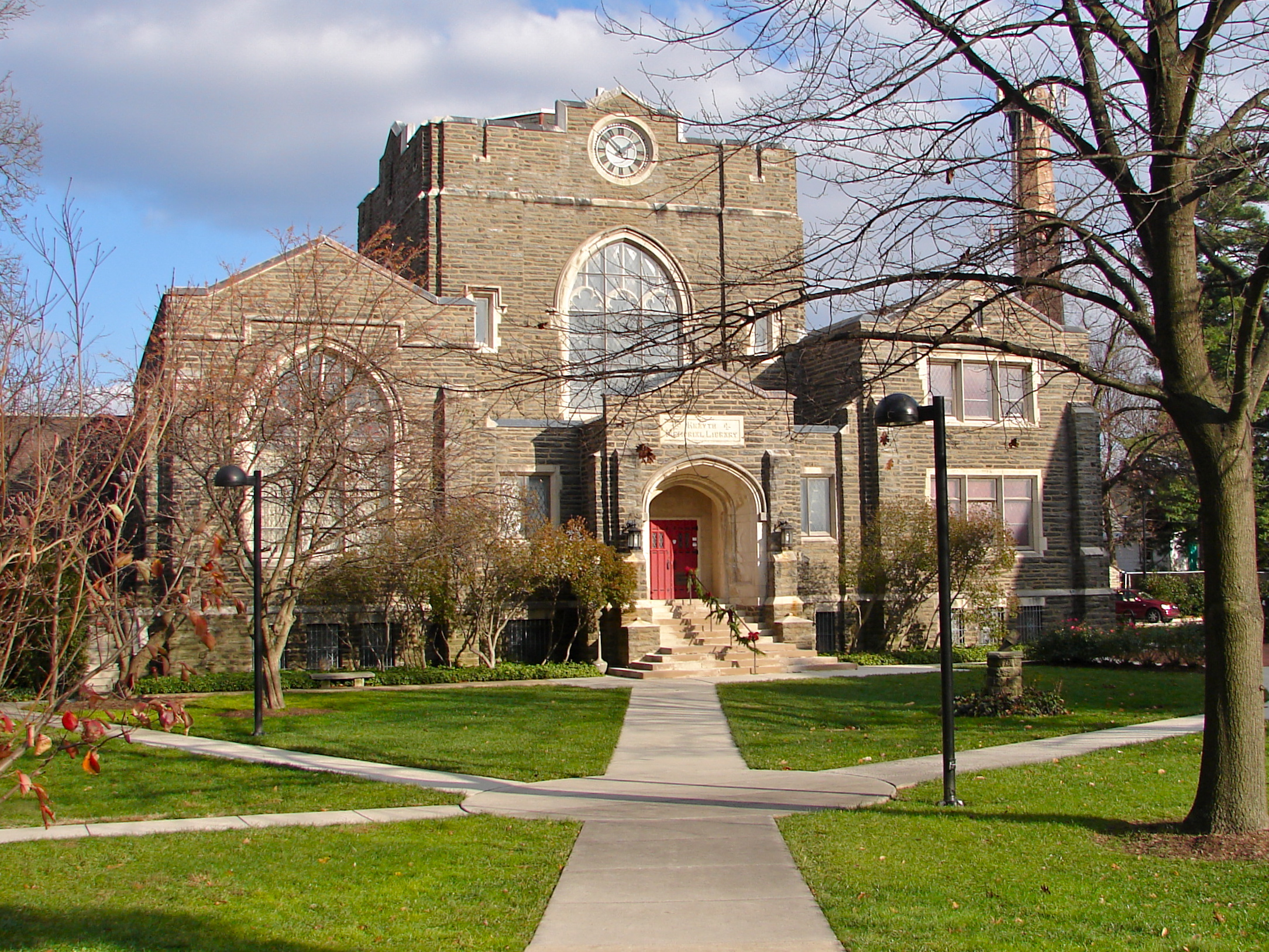
Krauth Memorial Library at the Lutheran Theological Seminary at Philadelphia; S. Joseph spent time during the 1970s for research exposure under then Prof. John H. P. Reumann.

While teaching at the Andhra Christian Theological College, Joseph qualified for undertaking doctoral level research and registered as a doctoral degree candidate with the Senate of Serampore College (University) through the Gurukul Lutheran Theological College, Madras. James Bergquist, a former professor at the Gurukul Lutheran Theological College and Deputy Director of the Theological Education Fund for Southern Asia of the World Council of Churches initiated the programme in 1973 to enable S. Joseph's overseas doctoral research and gather research material at the Ecumenical Institute and the École Biblique in Jerusalem, and at the Lutheran Theological Seminary at Philadelphia where he was supervised by John H. P. Reumann, then Professor of New Testament.

S. Joseph was a recipient of scholarship from the Goethe-Institut which enabled him to pursue German language studies at Lüneburg, Germany in order to access New Testament research materials in German language. Although S. Joseph returned to take up his teaching assignment at the Protestant Seminary in Secunderabad, it was not until 1980 that the Senate of Serampore College (University) awarded him the doctorate degree of Doctor of Theology (D.Th.). during the Registrarship of D. S. Satyaranjan. After nearly 27 years, S. Joseph was able to revise and publish his doctoral work in 2007 under the title Adaptation of the Gospel tradition in Luke.

== Ecclesiastical ministry ==
=== Pastoral ministry ===
The Waterbury Memorial Telugu Baptist Church in Perambur, Chennai is the oldest Baptist Church where S. Joseph served as a Pastor during 1964-1969, almost six years in pastoral ministry in suburban Chennai, Tamil Nadu.

In 1977 while teaching at the Protestant Regional Theologiate in Secunderabad, S. Joseph was elected as the President of the Centenary Baptist Church, Secunderabad, Telangana during the Pastorship of the Old Testament Scholar G. Solomon, who incidentally was his Teacher at Ramayapatnam.

=== Teaching ministry ===
==== Teacher ====
In 1969, on the invitation of the Louis F. Knoll then President of the Ramayapatnam Baptist Theological Seminary, S. Joseph moved from Madras to Rajahmundry to take up a teaching assignment at the Ramayapatnam Baptist Theological Seminary whose graduate section was housed within the campus of Andhra Christian Theological College, Rajahmundry until its merger in 1972 with the Andhra Christian Theological College. S. Joseph as a Spiritual Formator moulded the lives of generations of students creating interest in theological academic disciplines and the yearning to learn more in a systematic manner.

==== Principal ====
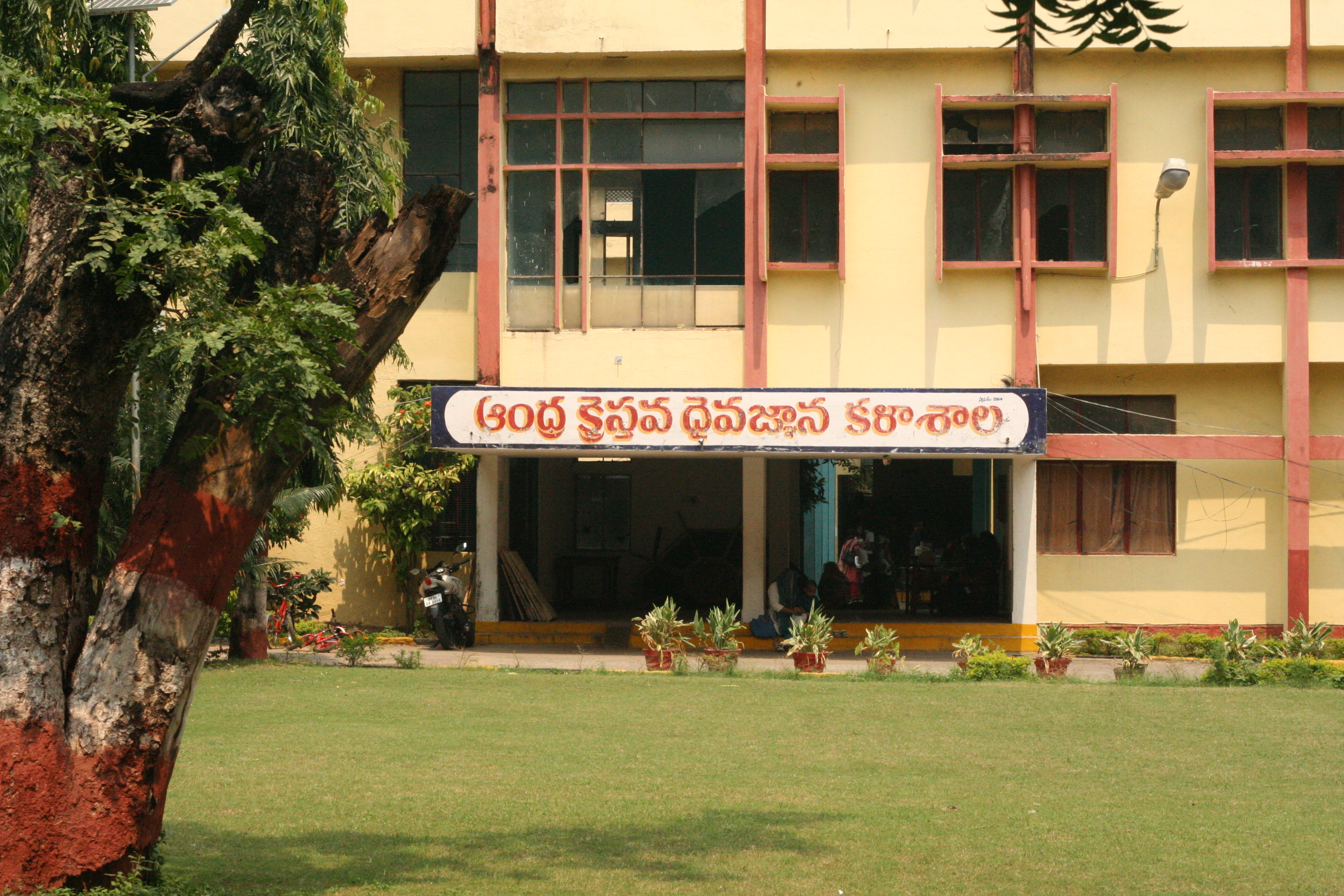
The Protestant Regional Theologiate in Secunderabad; S. Joseph was a Spiritual Formator here for more than three decades.

In 1986, when the 4-year cycle of Principalship rolled onto the Samavesam of Telugu Baptist Churches, its Church Society Council chose S. Joseph to lead the Society as the Principal of the Protestant Seminary. During the tenure of Suppogu Joseph as Principal, faculty lectures were initiated together with two of his colleagues, the Hamburg-educated New Testament Scholar Klaus Schafer and the Old Testament Scholar G. Babu Rao and the three of them were able to create interest among other faculty members to write scholarly papers which were reviewed and published under the title Reflections on Theology Today: Papers presented by Faculty of Andhra Christian Theological College, Secunderabad, India during the academic year 1988-89 on Theology and the Mission of the Church. Apart from Klaus Schafer, there was another visiting faculty from the Kirchliche Hochschule Wuppertal, de:Jürgen Fangmeier, a notable Systematic Theologian who also taught at the Protestant Seminary leading to availability of international Scholars at the Seminary.

In early 1990, S. Joseph led the Protestant Regional Theologiate in its Silver Jubilee Celebrations after the founding of the College in 1964 at Rajahmundry. The Silver Jubilee of the near-ecumenical initiative that resulted in the founding of the College marked a good number of footfall of the alumni over a period of 5 days during 17 to 21 January 1990 in the premises of the College in Secunderabad where Bible Studies and Reminiscences were held every day during the Silver Jubilee Week. which was also attended by his predecessor, K. David who travelled from Serampore. The Board of Governors of the College at that time included, S. E. Krupa Rao, B. R. Devapriam, D. N. Samuel, K. E. Swamidass, T. B. D. Prakasa Rao, Victor Premasagar and others.

After administering the Seminary for four years that ended in 1990, the Principalship rolled onto the Andhra Evangelical Lutheran Church Society which chose M. Victor Paul to represent the Church Society as Principal. After remaining in ACTC for one more academic year, S. Joseph accepted a teaching assignment in Gurukul Lutheran Theological College, Madras and proceeded on leave-on-lien returning to ACTC in 1998 after the Principalship of the Systematic Theologian R. Yesurathnam.

In 1992, S. Joseph was a recipient of residency at the Overseas Ministries Study Centre in New Haven, Connecticut, where he spent time on learning in a missional setting of diverse cultures.

== Contribution ==
S. Joseph contributed to the New Testament scholarship through his research and writings as well as made use of his administration experience at Seminaries.

=== New Testament Scholarship ===
Monsignor Gali Bali, an Old Testament Scholar and Bishop Emeritus of the Roman Catholic Diocese of Guntur reveals that the table fellowship of Jesus has great significance in everyday human life especially as the Church seeks to see people with the eyes of Christ himself where Gali Bali invokes Redemptor Hominis authored by Pope John Paul II. It is in such a setting that Suppogu Joseph's Table Fellowship of Jesus has special significance, especially in the light of the Lucan material through which S. Joseph explores the motives and theological emphases.

Delving further into the Lucan material, S. Joseph's second book entitled Adaptation of the Gospel Tradition in Luke looks at the possibilities of Inculturation especially to the Indian context. Pioneers like D. S. Amalorpavadass have taken much interest in Inculturation making major changes through the Second Vatican Council. Suppogu researched along the same period when the Second Vatican Council was confabulating but at a purely academic level.

The question whether the Christian Gospel can cross the cultural frontiers is tackled from the New Testament perspective. Taking the Gospel of Luke as an example, it attempts to determine the changes involved in adapting the Gospel Tradition to the Hellenistic setting when the Gospel moved from the Jewish setting. By analysing various examples in the Third Gospel, it tries to determine the extent of the various modifications Luke introduced in his source materials and pre-Lukan traditions. This gives an immense advantage in determining the limits of adaptation of the Gospel Tradition to the Indian.

=== Administration ===
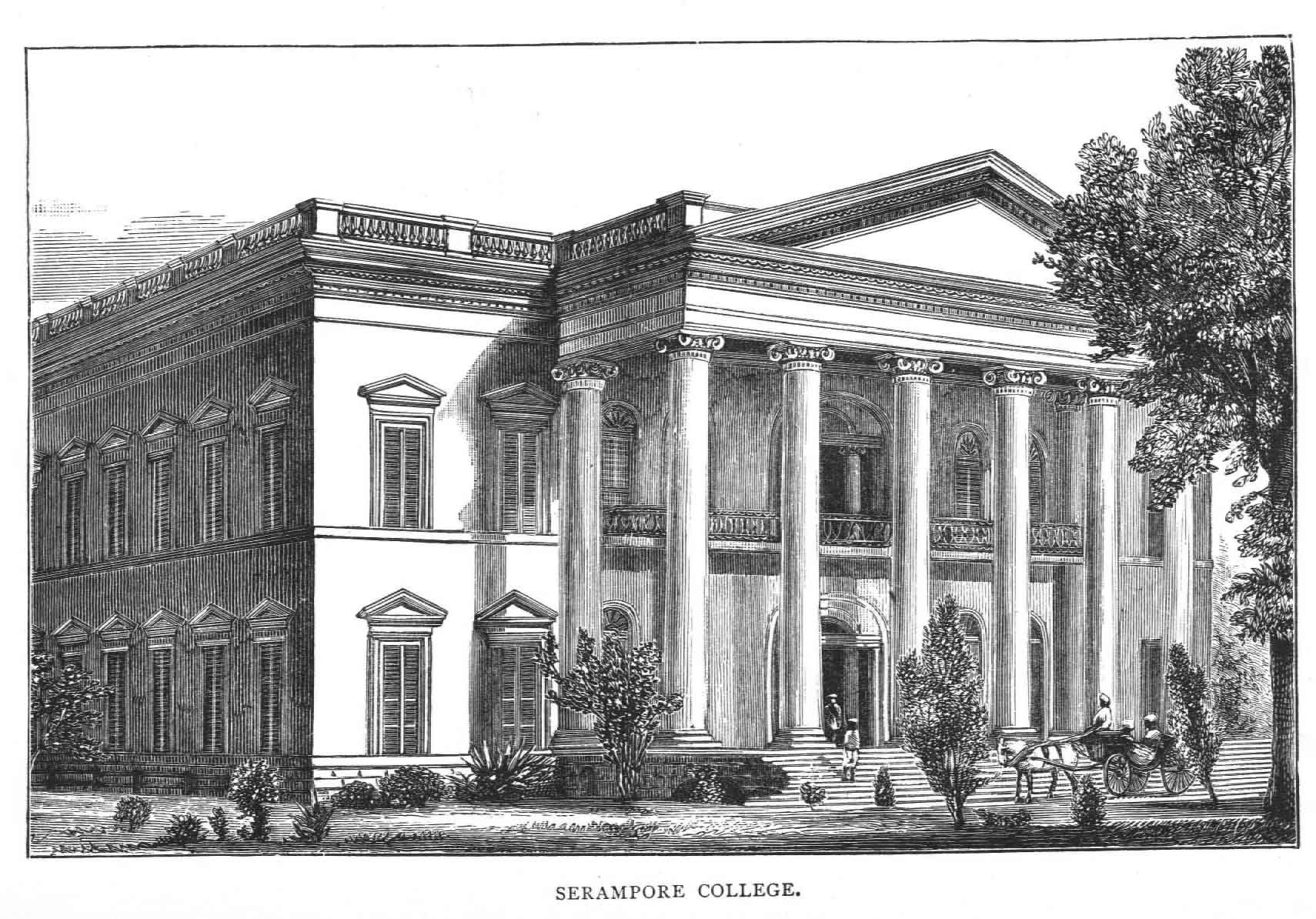
The Senate of Serampore College (University), Serampore, India - Suppogu Joseph pursued nearly 3/4ths of his studies in spiritual formation at this seat of learning and continues to be on the Council of this University.

The Senate of Serampore College (University), the country's first modern University within the meaning of Section 2(f) of the University Grants Commission Act, 1956 has been active in the Faculty of Theology whose degrees are equally recognised by the famed Universities including University of Cambridge and the University of Oxford, as much as any recognized University in the world. S. Joseph, as a theological educator and administrator was made a member of the Council of the University where he has been rendering administrative expertise since 2007.

Professional and academic associations
Preceded by Rene Van de Walle, S. J. 1984-1986	President, Society for Biblical Studies in India; 1986-1988	Succeeded by R. J. Raja, S. J. 1988-1992
Religious titles
Preceded by G. Cornelius David, STBC; 1959-1964	Pastor, STBC-Waterbury Memorial Telugu Baptist Church, Chennai, Tamil Nadu; 1964-1969	Succeeded by B. J. Christie Kumar, STBC; 1969-1975
Honorary titles
Preceded by B. A. John, ^{Laity} 1976	President, STBC-Centenary Baptist Church, Secunderabad, Telangana; 1977	Succeeded by B. J. John, ^{Laity} 1978
Academic offices
Preceded by Komaravalli David, CBCNC; 1980-1986	Principal, Andhra Christian Theological College, Secunderabad, Telangana; 1986-1990	Succeeded by M. Victor Paul, AELC; 1990-1993
Preceded by Komaravalli David, CBCNC; 1965-1987	Teacher - in - New Testament, Andhra Christian Theological College, Secunderabad, Telangana; 1969-2002	Succeeded by V. Manikya Rao, AELC; 2001- 2023
Educational offices
Preceded by -	Member, Council of the Senate of Serampore College (University), Serampore, West Bengal; 2007-	Succeeded by -
