= Brite Divinity School =

Divinity school in Fort Worth, Texas, US

- Type: Seminary
- Established: 1914; 112 years ago
- Religious affiliation: Christian Church (Disciples of Christ)
- Academic affiliation: Texas Christian University
- Endowment: $85.3 million (2020)
- President: Rev. Dr. Stephen M. Cady
- Location: Fort Worth, Texas, United States; 32.710136°N 97.359683°W
- Website: www.brite.edu

Brite Divinity School is a divinity school at Texas Christian University, a private university in Fort Worth, Texas. It is affiliated with the Christian Church (Disciples of Christ), approved by the University Senate of the United Methodist Church, and receives support for its Baptist Studies program from the Cooperative Baptist Fellowship. About thirty different denominations are represented in the student body of Brite, with the largest two usually being members of the Disciples of Christ and the United Methodist Churches. The current 20 full-time faculty members represent several different denominations.

== History ==
Presidio County rancher Lucas Charles "L.C." Brite and his wife, Edward "Eddie" Anderson Brite, built the First Christian Church in Marfa and endowed the Brite Divinity School at TCU. Initially named Brite College of the Bible, it received its current name in 1963.

In March 2024, Brite Divinity School hired Rev. Dr. Stephen M. Cady as President.

== Academics ==
Brite Divinity School is accredited by the Southern Association of Colleges and Schools Commission on Colleges and the Association of Theological Schools in the United States and Canada (ATS) and approved by ATS to grant the graduate degrees in theology and the ministry.

Brite Divinity School offers seven different theological degrees as well as two collaborate Master's degrees: Masters of Social Work and Masters of Business Administration.
