= Thumrukota =

- Village
- Interactive map of Thumrukota
- Location in Andhra Pradesh, India
- Coordinates: 16.5525°N 79.5533°E
- Country: India
- State: Andhra Pradesh
- District: Palnadu
- Mandal: Rentachintala

Government
  - Type: Panchayati raj
  - Body: Ganikapudi gram panchayat

Area
  - Total: 2,121 ha (5,240 acres)

Population (2011)
  - Total: 5,926
  - Density: 279.4/km^{2} (723.6/sq mi)

Languages
  - Official: Telugu
- Time zone: UTC+5:30 (IST)
- PIN: 522xxx
- Area code: +91–
- Vehicle registration: AP

Thumrukota is a village in Palnadu district of the Indian state of Andhra Pradesh. It is located in Rentachintala mandal of Gurazala revenue division.

== Etymology ==
The name Timmarusu Kota was derived from the poet Timmarusu.

== Government and politics ==
Thumrukota gram panchayat is the local self-government of the village. It is divided into wards and each ward is represented by a ward member. The ward members are headed by a Sarpanch.
