= Narayanguda =

- Locality
- Location in Telangana, India Narayanguda (Telangana) Narayanguda (India)
- Coordinates: 17°24′N 78°29′E
- Country: India
- State: Telangana
- District: Hyderabad
- City: Hyderabad

Languages
  - Official: Telugu
- Time zone: UTC+5:30 (IST)
- PIN: 500 029
- Vehicle registration: TG
- Parliament constituency: Hyderabad
- Assembly constituency: Himayatnagar

Naryanguda is a neighbourhood in Hyderabad, Telangana, India.

Narayanguda was the first area in Hyderabad to be recognised as an education area.
