= Louis F. Knoll =

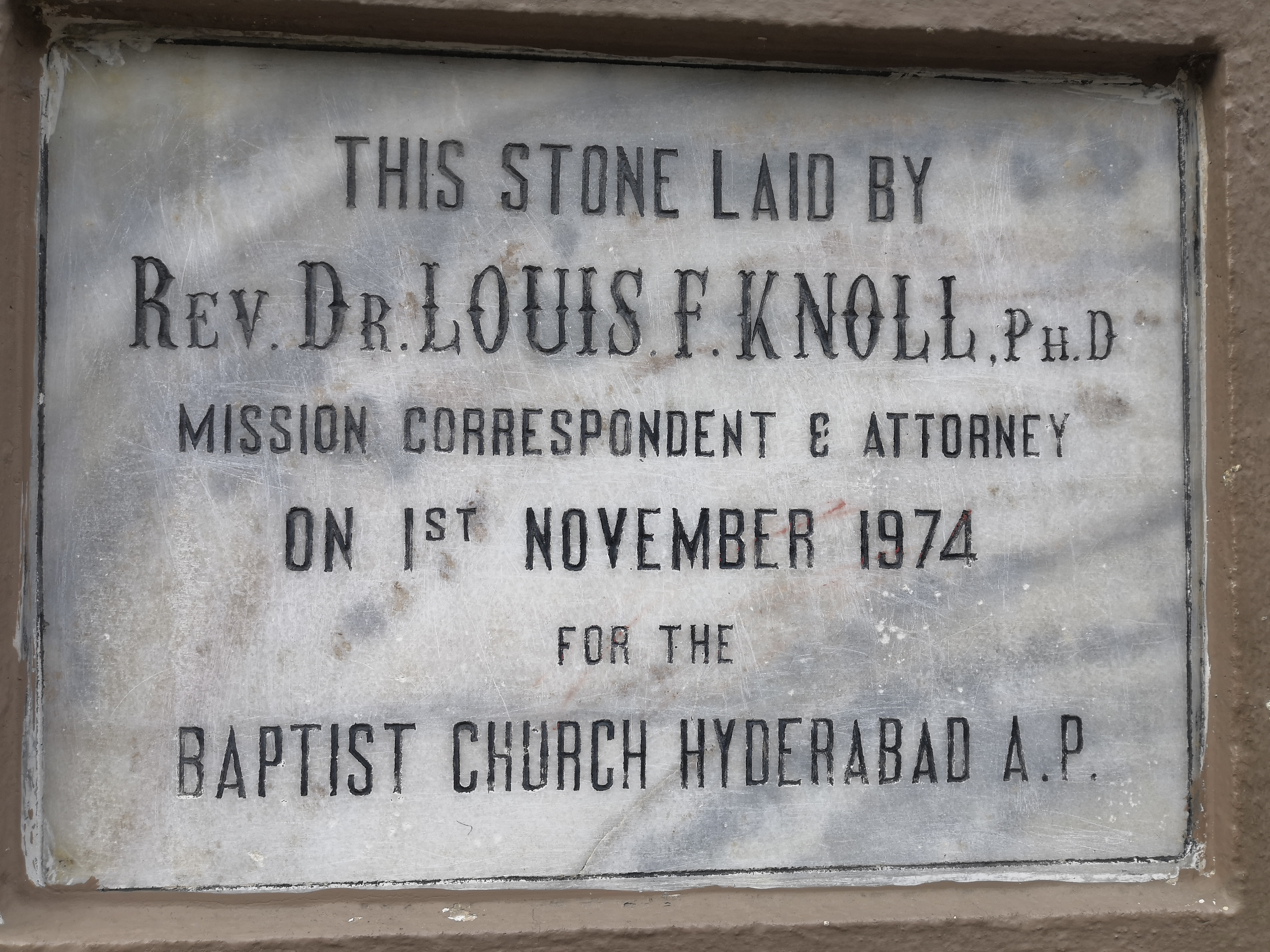
- 1974 inauguration tablet at Hyderabad
- Died: 12 February 2004
- Other name: Louis Fred Knoll
- Education: B. A. (Saskatchewan), B. D. (NBTS), M. A. (California), PhD (GTU)
- Church: Baptist International Missions, Inc., North America
- Writings: See Section
- Title: Reverend Doctor

Louis F. Knoll (died 2004) was an American Baptist missionary who taught Christian Ethics at the Andhra Christian Theological College, Hyderabad, affiliated with the Senate of Serampore College (University).

Robert Eric Frykenberg, Professor Emeritus of History & South Asian Studies at the University of Wisconsin, Madison writes that Louis F. Knoll believed that the British Rule in India was a major obstacle to the spread of Christianity in India.

== Leadership ==
=== India ===
Knoll was the co-founder of the Andhra Christian Theological College, Hyderabad. Samavesam of Telugu Baptist Churches ran their seminary in Ramayapatnam. At first in 1967, the B. D. section of the Ramayapatnam Baptist Theological College, of which he was the Principal, was made to be situated on the same campus of Andhra Christian Theological College before it was fully integrated into the Andhra Christian Theological College in 1972 through an Act of Integration performed by Louis F. Knoll and then acting Principal William P. Peery. Talathoti Punnaiah who underwent a 1-year spirituality course as an Aspirant at the Ramayapatnam Baptist Theological Seminary affirms the fact that it was Knoll as President of the Ramayapatnam Seminary who integrated the graduate section of the Ramayapatnam Seminary into the Andhra Christian Theological College.

The Mennonite Brethren Mission also sought Knoll to consolidate its organizational structure In 1978, when the Telugu movie Karunamayudu was released, the movie acknowledged the contribution of Knoll as a financial adviser displayed during the opening titles.

=== Overseas ===
After Knoll left India, he served as Vice President of the American Baptist Seminary of the West from 1978 to 1985.

== Writings ==
- 1951 – The Abrahamic covenant in the Light of History
- 1959 – The Role of the Depressed Classes in Andhra Pradesh
- 1967 – Now We are Together
- 1968 – Population Trends and the Mission of the Church in Andhra Pradesh
- 1971 – State and Religions in British India: 1814 to 1865
- 1975 - A Christian understanding of Hinduism (in Telugu)

== Studies ==
After pursuing doctoral studies at the Graduate Theological Union, Berkeley, California, Knoll was awarded the doctoral degree in 1971. His doctoral thesis is preserved in microfilm and kept at the Nehru Memorial Museum and Library in New Delhi.

== University academic ==
Knoll became a member of the Council of Senate of Serampore College (University) in 1966, a position in which he continued until his resignation in 1986. In 1972, Knoll became the Master of the University.

Honorary titles
Preceded by A. D. Khan; 1971	Master, Senate of Serampore College (University); 1972	Succeeded by A. D. Khan; 1973-1991
