= Ramayapatnam =

- Village
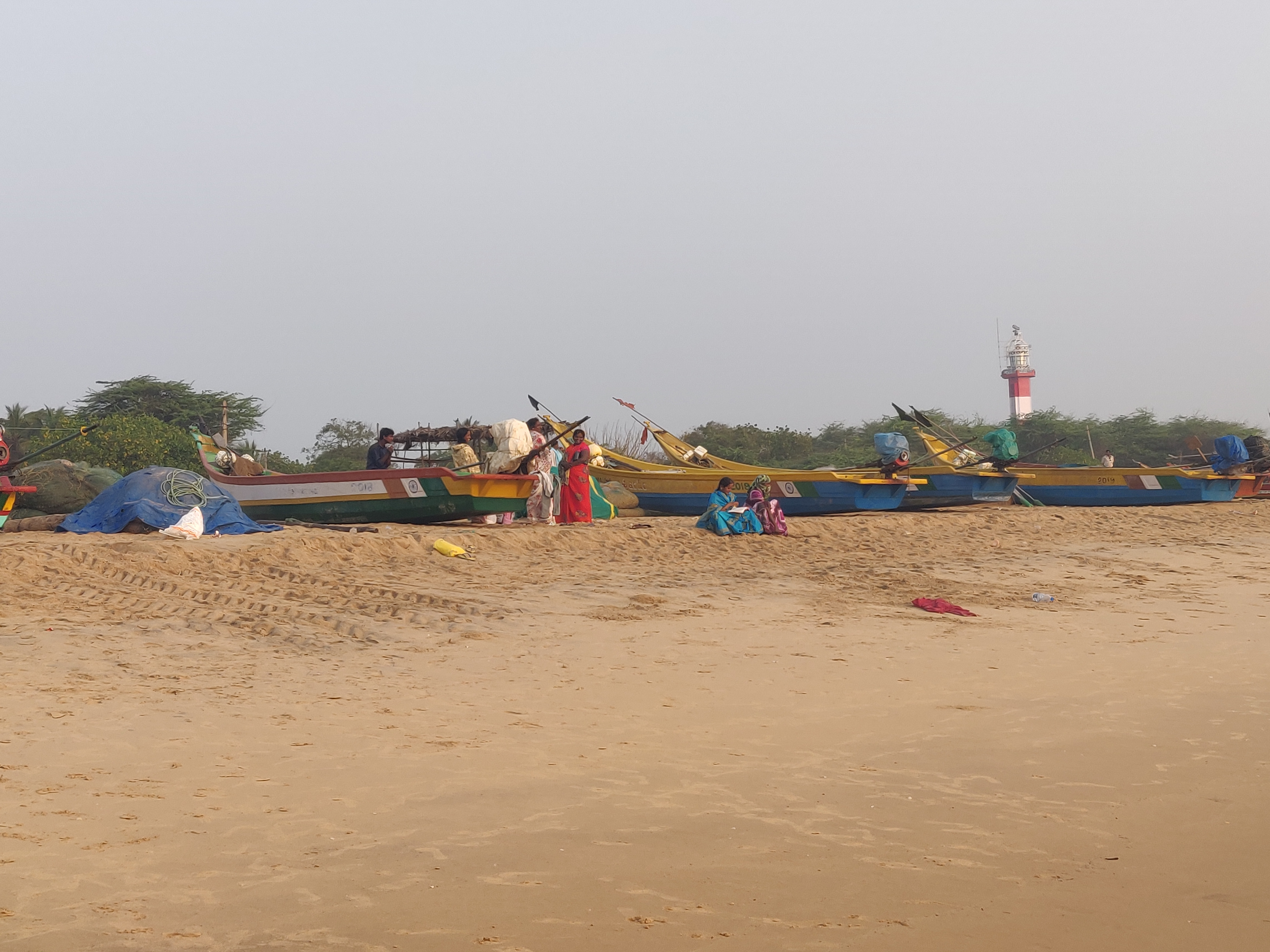
- Ramayapatnam Lighthouse
- Interactive map of Ramayapatnam
- Location in Andhra Pradesh, India Ramayapatnam (India)
- Coordinates: 15°02′N 80°03′E
- Country: India
- State: Andhra Pradesh
- District: Prakasam
- Mandal: Ulavapadu

Government
  - Type: democratic

Languages
  - Official: Telugu
- Time zone: UTC+5:30 (IST)

Ramayapatnam is a small village in Ulavapadu mandal of Prakasam district of Andhra Pradesh, India on the bank of the Bay of Bengal. It is located 4.5 km (2.8 mi) East of Tettu on NH-16. Its population is 2,236 as on 2011.

== Ramayapatnam port ==
Ramayapatnam Port Development Corporation Limited (RPDCL), a joint venture of Navayuga Engineering Company Limited (NECL) and Aurobindo Realty & Infrastructure Pvt. Ltd (AR & IPL) is constructing the port. The detailed project report (DPR) for the new port was prepared by RITES Ltd. The expected operationalization is early 2024.

== Ramayapatnam Lighthouse ==
Ramayapatnam Lighthouse comes under the control of central Government (Director General of Lighthouses and Lightships) under the Ministry of Ports, Shipping and Waterways, maintained by The Directorate of Lighthouses and Lightships, Visakhapatnam.
