= Samavesam of Telugu Baptist Churches =

Baptist Christian denomination

The Samavesam of Telugu Baptist Churches
- Abbreviation: STBC
- Classification: Protestant
- Orientation: Baptist
- Scripture: Protestant Bible
- Theology: Evangelical Baptist
- Polity: Congregational
- Governance: General Council
- President: Ch.V.Bhaskarao
- Add General Secretary: Chilaka Chakravarthi
- Associate Secretary: P.V.R.S.Kalyan
- Director for Evangelism: Rev.Z.peter
- Region: Andhra Pradesh, Tamil Nadu and Telangana
- Language: Telugu
- Headquarters: Markapuram
- Founder: American Baptist Foreign Mission Society
- Members: 740,000
- Places of worship: 830
- Primary schools: 14
- Secondary schools: 14

Samavesam of Telugu Baptist Churches (STBC) is a Baptist Christian denomination in the three states of Andhra Pradesh, Telangana and Tamil Nadu in India. The churches are part of the Telugu Christian community of Southern India. Its language is Telugu. It is affiliated to the Baptist World Alliance (BWA), the National Council of Churches in India (NCCI), World Council of Churches (WCC) and Christian Conference of Asia. Headquarters is in A.B.M Compound at Markapur, Prakasham District, Andhra Pradesh. The Samavesam of Telugu Baptist Churches today consists of 830 churches and 740,000 baptized members.

== History ==
American Baptists started missionary work in South India among Telugu-speaking people in 1836. In February 1840, Samuel Day along with his family moved to Nellore and rented a small bungalow to start his work. In March 1840, one more missionary couple, Van Husen and his wife joined them and with the help of a local British judge, Mr. Walker, they got some eight acres of land for a mission compound where a bungalow and a chapel were immediately erected on this land by 1841. On September 27, 1840, the first Telugu person Venkappa was baptised in the Penna river near Nellore. The Nellore church was formally organized in 1844 with 8 members including two missionary couples, two other Americans, and only two local people. The first local person to be ordained as a priest by the mission was Kanakiah who was from the Naidu caste and a native of Visakhapatnam. In 1855 when he was eighteen years old he took baptism and in 1860 he became the first ordained native pastor of the Nellore church.

In 1887 the existing churches were organized into the Convention of Telugu Baptist Churches. In 1962 the convention became the Samavesam of Telugu Baptist Churches, with a unanimously adopted constitution. It was registered in 1963. According to a census published by the association in 2023, it claimed 1,214 churches and 844,150 baptized members.

== Activities ==
It runs educational institutions, hospitals, health centres, and one theological seminary, in Ramapatnam. There are five degree colleges, eight junior colleges, 14 high schools, and 14 primary schools. The STBC would have 4,500 Sunday schools with an enrollment of some 72,000 children.

The STBC strongly favours interdenominational cooperation through the regional Councils of Churches in Andhra Pradesh, Telangana, Tamil Nadu and the National Council of Churches in India (NCCI). It participates actively in the programme of retreat and training centres of the Councils of Churches, for the training of voluntary church workers. It is involved in the work of the Henry Martin Institute of Islamic Studies in Hyderabad and the Christian Medical College in Vellore. It supports the Student Christian Movement and the United Mission Tuberculosis Sanatorium in Arogyavaram.

Recently with R.C.No.3/2021 dated: 28/06/2021(New Registration), the members have Re-Organised the General Council and General Body of Samavesham of Telugu Baptist Churches (Nellore), presently as Markapuram as Headquarters, A.B.M Compound at Markapur, Prakasham District, Andhra Pradesh.

== Theological college ==
The STBC train Pastors to work in its affiliated Churches through Ramayapatnam Baptist Theological Seminary, Ramayapatnam, Prakasam District, Andhra Pradesh. The Andhra Christian Theological College is an interdenominational theological college at Hyderabad is affiliated with the Serampore University, Kolkata.
