= S. E. Krupa Rao =

Indian Baptist pastor

The Reverend S. E. Krupa Rao, CBCNC Ayyagaru
- Born: Sreemanthula Eleazar Krupa Rao; 15 June 1939; Kakinada, East Godavari District (Andhra Pradesh)
- Died: 8 August 1993 (aged 54); Kakinada, East Godavari District (Andhra Pradesh)
- Education: P.D. (Serampore), L.Th. (Serampore), B.D. (Serampore), S.T.M. (Union); M.A. (Osmania)
- Alma mater: Serampore College, Serampore (West Bengal), Baptist Theological Seminary, Kakinada (Andhra Pradesh), Ramayapatnam Baptist Theological College, Rajahmundry (Andhra Pradesh), Union Theological Seminary (New York City) (United States); Osmania University, Hyderabad (Telangana)
- Occupation: Seminary Teacher
- Years active: 1963-1993 (30 years)
- Known for: Leadership abilities
- Parent(s): Smt. Kempuratnam and Sri Sreemanthula Issac
- Religion: Christianity
- Church: Protestant Convention of Baptist Churches of Northern Circars Society
- Ordained: 1977, Gudivada
- Congregations served: Nellimarla and Kakinada (Andhra Pradesh)
- Offices held: Pastor, Andhra Baptist Church, Nellimarla (1963-1968), Pastor, Andhra Baptist Church, Kakinada (1973-1976), Principal, Baptist Theological Seminary, Kakinada (1977-1993), Principal, Eva Rose York Bible Training and Technical School for Women, Tuni (1989-1993), Chairperson, Board of Governors, Andhra Christian Theological College, Secunderabad (1990-1992), Member, Council of Christian Hospitals, Pithapuram, Central Council Member, Bible Society of India, Bangalore
- Title: The Reverend

S. E. Krupa Rao (born 8 August 1939; died 15 June 1993) was a Baptist pastor of the Convention of Baptist Churches of Northern Circars where he held leadership positions in the Indian Church society whose area of operation extended from Srikakulam District in the northern circars along the Bay of Bengal right through seven districts up to Guntur district.

As an Administrator Krupa Rao contributed to the ministerial, technical and medical ministries of the Convention of Baptist Churches of Northern Circars, as Principal of the Baptist Theological Seminary, Kakinada and the Eva Rose York Bible Training and Technical School for Women, Tuni as well as to the Council of Christian Hospitals, Pithapuram. Krupa Rao headed the Major Seminary in Kakinada from 1977 through 1993, the longest ever in the history of the seminary till that point of time. In 1989, he also became Principal of the Eva Rose York Bible Training and Technical School for Women, Tuni succeeding Mildred H. Law.

== Studies ==
Krupa Rao underwent scholastic studies between 1945-1955 at the CBM-High School and the Zilla Parishad High School in Samalkota and moved to Kakinada for collegiate studies between 1955-1957 to the Pithapuram Raja College.

Rao was an active Sunday School Teacher in one of the Churches of the Convention of Baptist Churches of Northern Circars. As a resident of Kakinada, Krupa Rao came under the influence of then Principal of the Baptist Theological Seminary, A. B. Masilamani who was acting as a Vocation Promoter leading youth towards Priesthood. Masilamani became Krupa Rao's Spiritual Confessor and was able to guide Krupa Rao towards Priesthood making him take up a propadeutic course during 1959-1961 at the Serampore College, Serampore {a constituent College of the Senate of Serampore College (University)} during the Principalship of William Stewart where Rao discerned his avocation towards priesthood and returned to Kakinada and joined the Baptist Theological Seminary, Kakinada during the Principalship of Waldo Penner to pursue licentiate studies in theology leading to L.Th. By this time, in 1964, the Seminary in Kakinada, together with the Andhra Union Theological College, Dornakal and the Lutheran Theological College in Rajahmundry jointly formed the near-ecumenical Andhra Christian Theological College and Krupa Rao's studies were transferred from the seminary to this College under the Principalship of W. D. Coleman and by 1965 and was awarded an L.Th. in the ensuing convocation of the University during the Registrarship of C. Devasahayam.

=== Graduate and postgraduate ===
In 1968, Krupa Rao joined the Ramayapatnam Baptist Theological Seminary (affiliated to the Senate of Serampore College (University)) whose B.D. section was housed within the premises of the Andhra Christian Theological College, Rajahmundry to upgrade his academics to Bachelor of Divinity studying under G. Solomon, Louis F. Knoll, K. Wilson, W. D. Coleman, G. Devasahayam, W. P. Peery, Eric J. Lott, B. E. Devaraj, Ryder Devapriam, Suppogu Joseph, M. Victor Paul and other distinguished faculty. After nearly a decade, Krupa Rao was sent to the Union Theological Seminary, New York City (affiliated to Columbia University) where he studied for a master's course in theology during 1979-1980 leading to S.T.M.

== Ecclesiastical ministry ==
=== Pastoral ===
After completing a licentiate course in theology in 1965, Krupa Rao began pastoring Nellimarla parish from 1965 to 1968. Again from 1973 through 1976, he pastored the Andhra Baptist Church - Jagannaickpur parish in Kakinada.

=== Spiritual Formator ===
In 1976, Krupa Rao became a Spiritual Formator at the Protestant Baptist Theological Seminary, Kakinada where aspirants enroll to discern their avocation towards priesthood. Rao, together with his other companions, The Rev. G. Novahu Raju and The Rev. C. L. Johnson used to spiritually guide and mentor the aspirants. Later, Rao also led the seminary as Principal succeeding Gordon Dewolfe Barss. During Rao's tenure, he also took up the role of a Vocation Promoter guiding youth towards Priesthood enabling them not only to take up propadeutic courses and being their Spiritual Confessor but also enabling the aspirants to turn their ministerial calling into a perpetual profession and continue their spiritual studies at the Protestant Regional Theologiate in Hyderabad in which the Convention of Baptist Churches of Northern Circars is a participating member.

=== Medical ===
As a member of the Council of Christian Hospitals, Krupa Rao took part in the management of the medical institutions founded by Canadian Baptist Ministries, namely,

- Andhra Pradesh based,
  - Christian Medical Centre, Pithapuram, East Godavari District,
  - Bethel Hospital, Vuyyuru, Krishna District,
  - Star of Hope Hospital, Akiveedu, West Godavari District,
- Odisha based,
  - Serango Christian Hospital, Serango, Gajapati District, Odisha,

Krupa Rao used to represent the Council of Christian Hospitals in the Association and Council of the Christian Medical College & Hospital, Vellore. Krupa Rao was also a member of the Christian Medical Association of India.

=== Ministerial ===
==== Andhra Christian Theological College ====
Krupa Rao, as a member of the Seminary Council of the Baptist Theological Seminary, Kakinada, represented the Convention of Baptist Churches of Northern Circars Society on the Board of Governors of the near-ecumenical Andhra Christian Theological College, a Protestant Regional Theologiate situated in Secunderabad which had a four-member representation on the faculty from the CBCNC during that period, namely, K. David, G. Babu Rao, K. D. G. Prakasa Rao and D. J. Jeremiah. In the course of time, Krupa Rao became the Chairperson of the Board during 1990-1992 where he held a name for himself and was able to steer clear of controversies much like his Spiritual Confessor, A. B. Masilamani.

In 1990 during the rotation of Principalship from Samavesam of Telugu Baptist Churches Society to the Andhra Evangelical Lutheran Church Society, Krupa Rao played a notable role. It was the Samavesam of Telugu Baptist Churches Society which held the Principalship from 1986 through 1990 on a 4-year rotation basis and was then supposed to pass it on to the Andhra Evangelical Lutheran Church Society but lack of quorum at the Board of Governors meeting of the Andhra Christian Theological College, Hyderabad made the decision to prolong. As the day progressed, Krupa Rao, as Chairperson of the Board of Governors together with Governor Ryder Devapriam ensured that efforts were made to maintain a proper quorum resulting in holding of the Board of Governors meeting which then resolved to pass on the 4-year cycle of Principalship to the Andhra Evangelical Lutheran Church Society. Suppogu Joseph was the outgoing Principal while M. Victor Paul was the Principal-designate during 1990. Incidentally, both Suppogu Joseph and M. Victor Paul happened to tutor Krupa Rao during his upgrading studies at Andhra Christian Theological College at its erstwhile campus at Rajahmundry.

==== Bible Society of India ====
As a Branch Secretary of the Bible Society of India Andhra Pradesh Auxiliary, Krupa Rao was instrumental in taking forward the Bible cause. In 1977, Krupa Rao became a member of the Bible Society of India Andhra Pradesh Auxiliary Committee and later became a member of the Executive Committee of the Bible Society of India Central Office in Bangalore. During Krupa Rao's stint at the Bible Society, he worked closely with his companion Lella Prakasam, then Auxiliary Secretary stationed at the Bible House, Secunderabad who also happened to hail from the Convention of Baptist Churches of Northern Circars.

Educational offices
| Preceded by Mildred H. Law, CBM; 1987-1989 | Principal, Eva Rose York Bible Training and Technical School for Women, Tuni, Andhra Pradesh; 1989-1993 | Succeeded by M. S. G. Lalitha Kumari, CBCNC; 1993-2011 |
Academic offices
| Preceded by Gordon D. Barss, CBM; 1975-1977 | Principal, Baptist Theological Seminary, Kakinada, Andhra Pradesh; 1976-1993 | Succeeded by C. L. Johnson, CBCNC; 1993-2014 |
Honorary titles
| Preceded by S. Benjamin, STBC; 1988-1990 | Chairperson, Board of Governors, Andhra Christian Theological College, Secunderabad, Telangana; 1990-1992 | Succeeded by T. Anantham, SALC; 1992-1993 |
