= Muthyala Theophilus =

Indian Protestant priest

Professor M. Theophilus CBCNC
- Born: Muthyala Theophilus; 7 May 1895; Gunnanapudy, Krishna district, Andhra Pradesh
- Died: 10 December 1946 (aged 51); Kakinada, East Godavari district, Andhra Pradesh
- Other name: Theophilus Ayyagaru
- Education: B.D. (Serampore)
- Alma mater: CBM-McLaurin High School, Kakinada (Andhra Pradesh); Pitapuram Rajah College, Kakinada (AP); Serampore College, Serampore (West Bengal)
- Occupation: Spiritual Formator
- Years active: 1924–1946 (22 years)
- Parent(s): Smt. Mary and Sri Benjamin

Ecclesiastical career
- Religion: Christianity
- Church: Convention of Baptist Churches of Northern Circars
- Congregations: President, CBCNC-Andhra Baptist Church, Kakinada (1931–1934)
- Offices held: Teacher, CBM-McLaurin High School, Kakinada (1917), Professor, STBC-Ramayapatnam Baptist Theological Seminary, Ramayapatnam (1924–1926), Professor, CBCNC-Baptist Theological Seminary, Kakinada (1926–1946); President, Christian Endeavour Union of India (1939); Senator, Senate of Serampore College (University), Serampore, West Bengal (1942–1946)
- Title: Professor

M. Theophilus (7 May 1895 – 10 December 1946) was a Baptist Patriarch and Spiritual Formator of the Protestant Convention of Baptist Churches of Northern Circars, a major congregation along the Bay of Bengal in Andhra Pradesh, India that extends from Srikakulam District in the northern tip through Guntur district in the middle. Theophilus taught at the Baptist Theological Seminary, Kakinada during the period 1926–1946 and was also Senator of India's first University, the Senate of Serampore College (University) during 1942–1946 taking forward not only the theological concerns of the university but also the concerns of Serampore College, which as a dual University affiliated entity, had the arts, science and commerce faculties affiliated to the University of Calcutta. In matters of Church union, Theophilus actively cooperated with the National Council of Churches in India that not only incorporated the Protestant and the Oriental Orthodox Churches but also reached out to the Catholics.

The timeline of Theophilus (1895–1946), though short lived, can almost be put in the same line of Juhanon Mar Thoma (1893–1976), the Mar Thoma Patriarch who happened to study at the seminary in Bangalore around the period when Theophilus was undergoing spiritual studies at Serampore between 1919 and 1924.

Theophilus was an ecumenist who envisioned a Church that surpassed doctrinal barriers. Both Theophilus and his companion Gordon P. Barss took the lead to take up conversations between the Baptists and a few other Protestant congregations comprising the Anglicans, Congregationalists, Methodists, and Presbyterians for forming a Union. The untimely death of Theophilus in 1946 toned down the strength of the dialogue and the Baptists could not join the Church of South India that was inaugurated in 1947 at St. George's Cathedral, Madras. While this was so, the Baptists of North India joined the Church of North India in 1970. The Church Historian, D. J. Jeremiah, a member of the Church History Association of India writes that,

Theophilus was one of the chief architects of the Convention of Baptist Churches of Northern Circars. His leadership was well recognised both at the state and national level. His interest in other Churches and his contacts with other denominational leaders enriched and moulded his thinking and though he was an ardent Baptist, he fought for a Church Union. He could not bear nor did he believe in denominational differences. He strongly recommended for Church Union and published his articles in Ravi. But his death in 1946 put an end to the move towards union on the part of the CBCNC.

In 1948, G. R. Lorne of Kakinada wrote a well-researched biography replete with footnotes on M. Theophilus. In one of the chapters, Lorne highlights the personal prayer and devotional life of Theophilus who seemed to take much interest in reading titles on St. Francis of Assisi, St. Francis de Sales, Sadhu Sundar Singh and other devotional reading material. Lorne wrote that Theophilus had much concern for the clergy seeing them as servants of Christ.

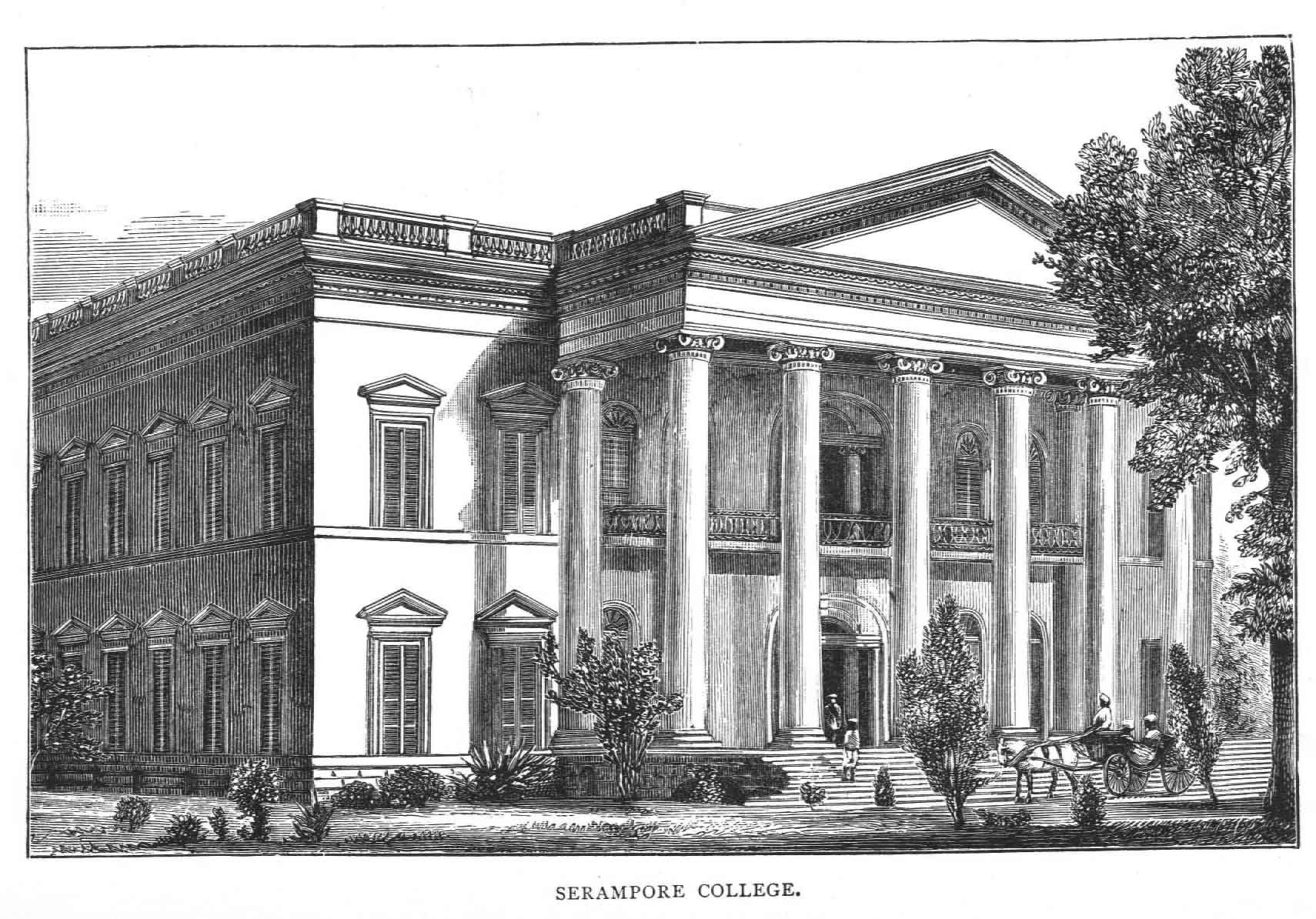
The Senate of Serampore College (University) where Theophilus was a Senator.

== Writings ==
In 1993, the Board of Theological Education of the Senate of Serampore College during the incumbency of H. S. Wilson commissioned vernacular bibliography lists to be prepared for which the Church Historian, Ravela Joseph with the assistance of Suneel Bhanu took the onus to prepare a comprehensive list of original Christian writings in Telugu language in which one of the writings of M. Theophilus was also listed.

- 1935 (with L. E. Wilton), The Light of the Harmony of the Gospels,
- 1935, Life history of William Carey,
- 1941, Pioneers of the Canadian Baptist Mission

== Studies ==
=== Scholastic and collegiate ===
Theophilus hailed from Krishna District and schooled at Gunnanapudy, a mission station of the Canadian Baptist Ministries and during the course of his scholastic studies, he was transferred from one place to the other, first to Akiveedu in 1907, Samalkot in 1908 and finally to Kakinada in 1912 to the CBM-McLaurin High School. For collegiate studies, Theophilus enrolled at the local Pitapuram Rajah College in Kakinada in 1915 and also taught as a Teacher in 1917 at his alma mater, the CBM-McLaurin High School.

=== Theologiate ===
In 1919, the Canadian Baptist Ministries sent Theophilus to the Serampore College, Serampore to pursue spiritual studies leading to Bachelor of Divinity. Theophilus lived in the old Danish town studying at the theological faculty at Serampore College which also had students studying for arts, science and commerce under George Howells, then principal of the historical college. The study companions of Theophilus included P. K. Abraham, V. T. Chacko, M. I. Daniel, A. Hyder Ali, J. S. Choudhary, G. M. Kanagaratnam, D. Naik and P. Premanandan. After nearly three years of spiritual formation studies, Theophilus took ill in 1922 and was sent to the Tuberculosis Sanatorium, Madanapalle where he spent nearly a year between 1922 and 1923 recuperating from his illness. In October 1923, Theophilus returned to Serampore in 1924 to complete his graduate studies. A year later, the university awarded the degree of B.D. to Theophilus in the ensuing convocation during the Registrarship of The Rev. John Drake.

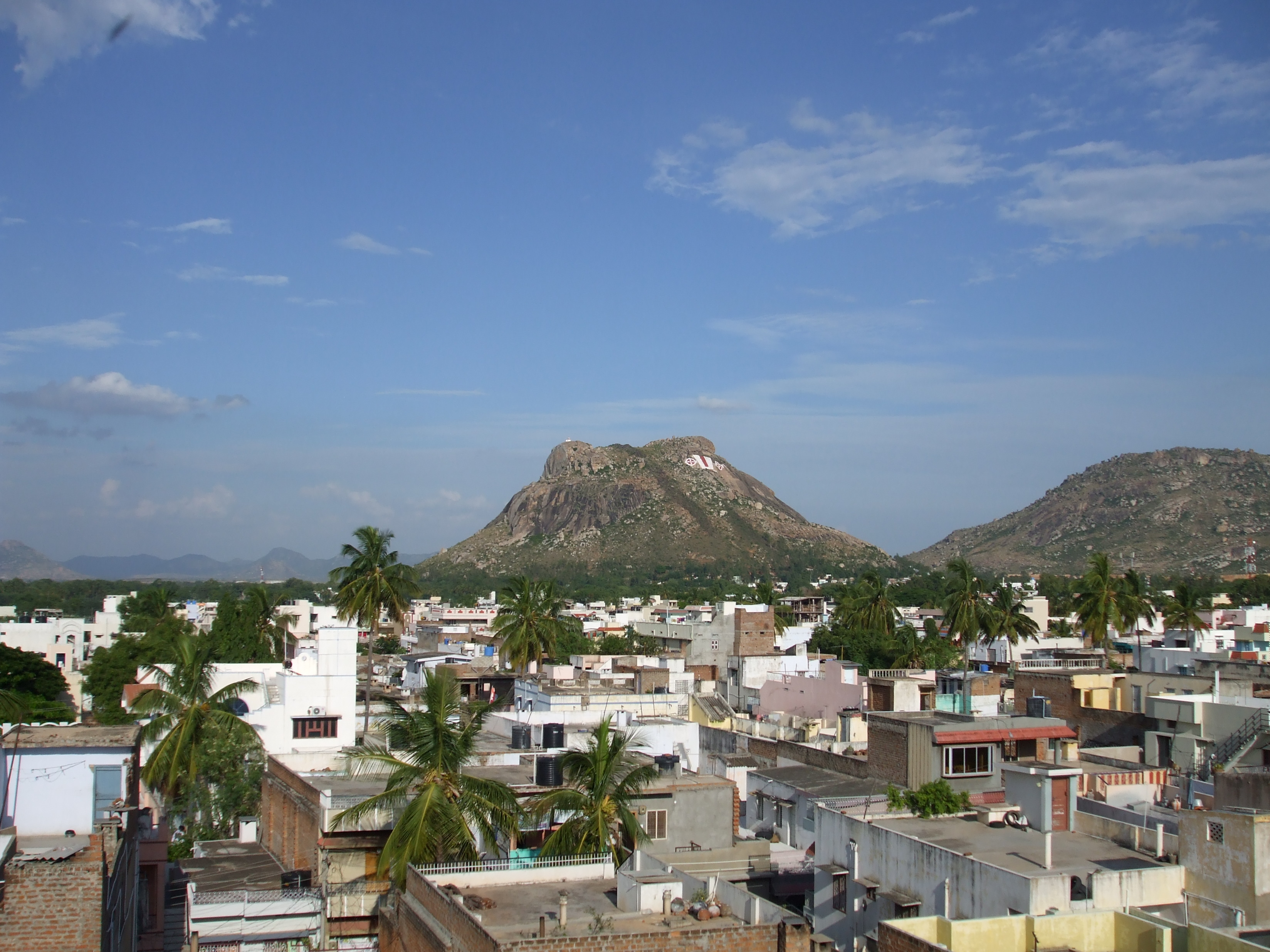
Madanapalli, the place where the Church of South India-Sanatorium is located. Theophilus was first admitted here during 1922–1923.

== Academic career ==
=== Ramayapatnam ===
In July 1924, Theophilus moved to Ramayapatnam, a mission station of the American Baptists in southern Andhra Pradesh. Incidentally, the Canadian Baptists initiated their mission together with the American Baptists during the 19th century. Though the Canadian Baptists moved to Kakinada and started a stand-alone mission in 1874 on the invitation of Thomas Gabriel, and also started a seminary in 1882, it was shut down in 1920 and the existing students and faculty were transferred to Ramayapatnam. Theophilus, who joined the faculty of the Ramayapatnam Baptist Theological Seminary in 1924, stayed on in Ramayapatnam teaching seminarians until 1926.

=== Kakinada ===
In 1926, the seminary in Kakinada was revived leading to the recall of the Canadian Baptist faculty from Ramayapatnam. Theophilus moved from Ramayapatnam to Kakinada in East Godavari District where he taught at the Baptist Theological Seminary from 1926 onwards along with C. Bhanumurthy. Theophilus joined the seminary in 1926 and served under three Principals, namely, J. B. McLaurin, Gordon P. Barss, and Archibald Gordon. It was during this period that a young aspirante, A. B. Masilamani joined the seminary and would later on became a major contributor to the Church. Theophilus and his companions, Chetti Bhanumurthy, Gordon P. Barss, and Archibald Gordon worked towards university affiliation that required a rigorous academic regimen which was already in place at the seminary. In 1946, the university granted affiliation to the Baptist Theological Seminary which then began offering courses leading to Licentiate in Theology which also saw an increased uptake with a record number of 46 admissions that year.

Theophilus taught at the seminary for nearly twenty years until he died suddenly in 1946 while being on duty within the portals of the seminary leading to untold grief and sadness that engulfed the seminary and the CBCNC which the Indian Church History Review puts it as,

A great blow and great sadness came to the Seminary in 1946 in the death of Theophilus.

== Contribution ==
=== All India Sunday School Association ===
Theophilus was an examiner to the All India Sunday School Association (formerly Union) of the National Council of Churches in India.

=== Christian Endeavour ===
In 1939, Theophilus was elected President of the Christian Endeavour Societies' Union of India, Burma and Ceylon and had been instrumental in organizing Christian Endeavour meetings in East Godavari district since 1932.

=== Convention ===
Theophilus was involved in efforts to form the Convention of Baptist Churches of Northern Circars to work together with the Canadian Baptist Ministries. Theophilus believed in the Indian ethos and conceived a team comprising the Canadians and the Indians working towards the Christian mission of the Church with the clergy in the lead.

In 1947, when the Convention of Baptist Churches of Northern Circars was formed, the Clergy led the Society in line with the wishes of Theophilus. At one point of time, A. B. Masilamani who happened to be a student of Theophilus also became President of the CBCNC in 1959. After nearly 25 years of the formation of the CBCNC, successive leaderships disregarded the clergy with the Laity in the lead, leading to obvious conflict of interest on the part of the Laity who showed scant regard to the Christian mission leading to a plethora of lawsuits and legal recourse leading to chaotic disruptions in the Convention of Baptist Churches of Northern Circars resulting in an irrevocable crisis that brewed in 1972 that caught the attention of Research Scholars, especially M. B. Diwakar who undertook a study titled, An Investigation into the historical antecedents of the crisis in the CBCNC during 1972 to 1974.

=== Senate of Serampore College (University) ===
In 1942, Theophilus became a Senator of the Senate of Serampore College (University) representing the Baptists of India in the Senate coinciding with the Registrarship and Principalship led by The Rev. C. E. Abraham and The Rev. G. H. C. Angus respectively.

==== The setting of Bengal and India during 1942–1946 ====
The period 1942–1946 when Theophilus was Senator of the university was a crucial one and managing a university during that period required great amounts of courage, patience and persistence on part of the Senators as the Second World War was already underway and India unwittingly became a participant in the World War II fighting the advance of the Japanese who launched the 'Operation U-Go' assisted by Netaji Subash Chandra Bose of the Azad Hind Fauj in the South-East Asian Theatre and as a consequence, it led to the Bengal famine of 1943 during which lakhs died as the Government sought a major portion of the harvest to help sustain the food supplies of the British Indian Army.

==== 1942–1946 a period of exile for the University ====
As for the Senate of Serampore College (University), the period has been termed by Prof. K. R. Chatterjee as a 'period of exile' as the British Indian Army sought the premises of Serampore College for use as a makeshift hospital and in the ensuing year in 1943, the whole college premises was made use of the military authorities. In such a situation, the Senate of Serampore College (University) had no option but to house the university and its college in makeshift premises at multiple locations, at the Serampore Union Institution on Bhattacharya Street, a rented house in Church Street, both in Serampore, at rented portions in Chandernagore, a French colony situated nearly 20 kilometres upstream of Hooghly river in the northerly direction of Serampore and also at Calcutta on Lower Circular Road.

In spite of the difficulties, the academics and administration of the university went on and in 1942 Serampore College, the constituent college of the university, became a co-education institution where women students were admitted in the Arts-Science-Commerce Department, a new venture undertaken by the Senators of the university which also experimented with oral tests as paper became a scarce commodity, an initiative which grew out of dire need but became successful.

As for the library of the constituent college of the university, all the books on its stacks were moved in riverboats upstream to Chandernagore and students also assisted in efforts to relocate the library in its entirety. However, when the French sought the building where the university was housed, the library had to be moved back to Serampore in 1945 and was housed in the CNI-St. Olave's Church.

==== The end of World War II and rebuilding of the university in 1946 ====
Though the Second World War ended in September 1945, it was not until 1946 that the Serampore College premises was handed back to the university authorities and gargantuan efforts were made by the Senators to restore the college back to its old glory as the premises was in an unkempt shape. Prof. K. R. Chatterjee records that by July 1946, Serampore College was able to open its academic year in its usual manner. Meanwhile, the British Empire as a prelude to the Independence of India sent a Cabinet Mission to India in 1946 and the same year, the city of Calcutta witnessed the worst ever communal riots and during the succeeding year in August 1947, Bengal was partitioned.

==== Administration of the university during 1942–1946 ====
During the period when Theophilus was Senator (1942–1946), the administration of the university was carried out from Chandernagore and the Senators managed to hold one convocation there in 1944 during the war period. Many seminaries in India which were affiliated to the university at that time and the ministerial candidates who studied during that period emerged as responsible Clergy who went on to assume key leadership roles in the Church in India who included A. E. Inbanathan and C. Arangaden, both of whom served the Bible cause through the Bible Society of India, Joshua Russell Chandran and Stanley Jedidiah Samartha who served the cause of theological education, B. G. Prasada Rao and G. S. Luke who led the Church of South India in their respective Dioceses in Telangana, Philipose Mar Chrysostom who became the longest-serving Bishop in India and others.

=== Student Christian Movement ===
Theophilus was a member of the Student Christian Movement and became President of the Andhra Pradesh Unit of the SCMI in 1939 and led many college students to active membership.

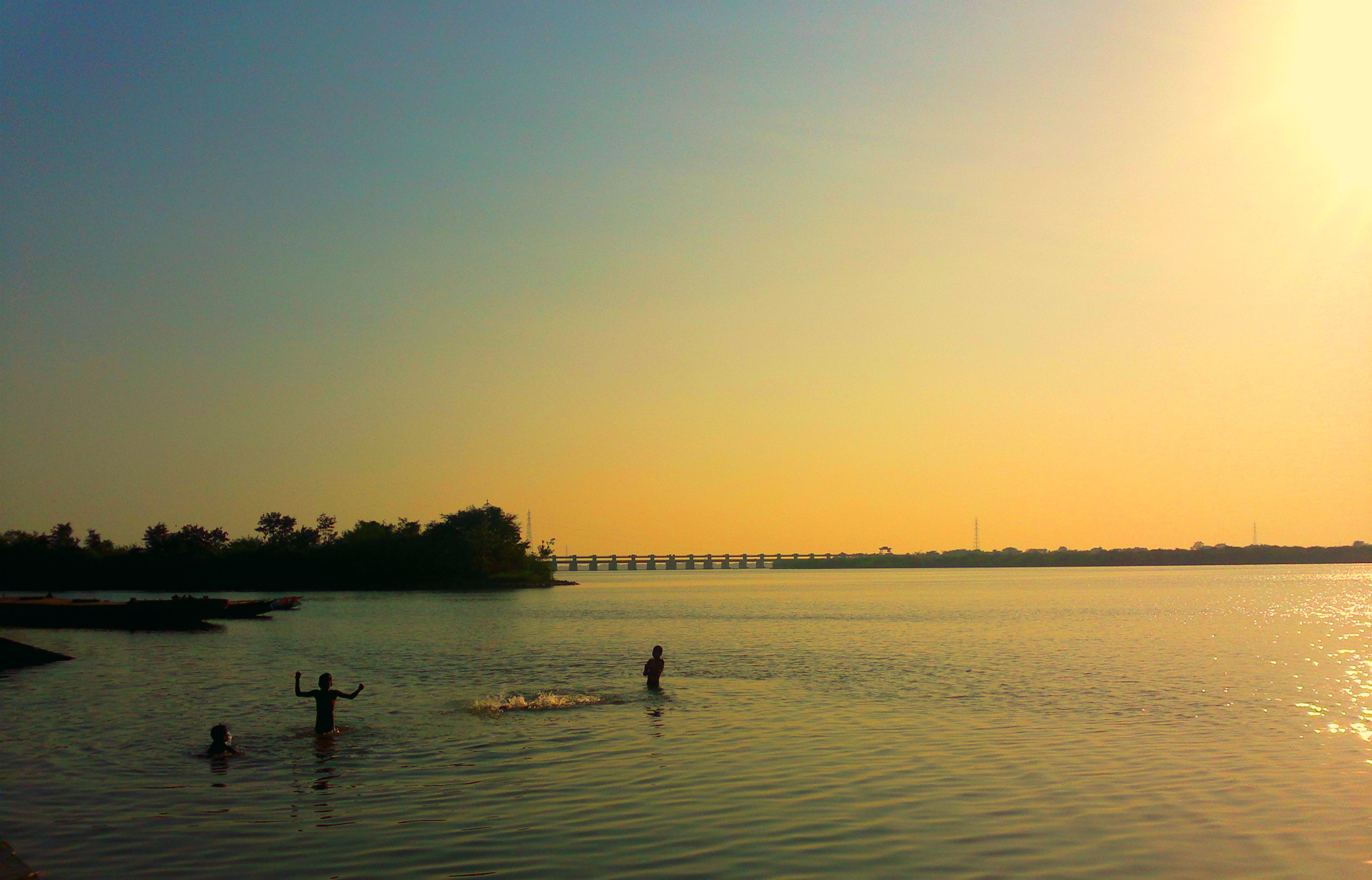
Sunset View at Dowleswaram Godavari. Theophilus was admitted at the AELC-Sanatorium during 1936.

=== Andhra Baptist Church, Kakinada ===
In 1931, Theophilus became Honorary President of the Andhra Baptist Church in the neighbourhood of the Seminary in Kakinada and held the position for four years until 1934 coinciding with the Pastorships of The Rev. C. Prakasam and Pastor P. Premanandam.

== Theophilus – the professor who endured illness ==
In 1923, when Tuberculosis first struck Theophilus in Serampore while he was studying, he was able to recuperate at the Church of South India-Sanatorium in Madanapalle. However, Tuberculosis once again struck Theophilus in 1936 when he was teaching at the seminary in Kakinada from where he moved to Gopalpur-on-Sea to a mission station of the Canadian Baptist Ministries for rest and again to Rajahmundry, the same year, where he was admitted to the Andhra Evangelical Lutheran Church-Sanatorium and then moved to Vengurla in 1937 to the Church of North India Sanatorium. For nearly twenty years', Theophilus endured Tuberculosis until his death on 10 December 1946 at the ground floor of the administrative building of the Baptist Theological Seminary in Kakinada where he lay motionless in his chair until a student who came out from the classroom that morning to enquire about his Professor who was unduly delayed, but to his shock, discovered his Professor lying in a chair, calm and motionless, an incident which remained etched in the history of the Baptist Theological Seminary, Kakinada.

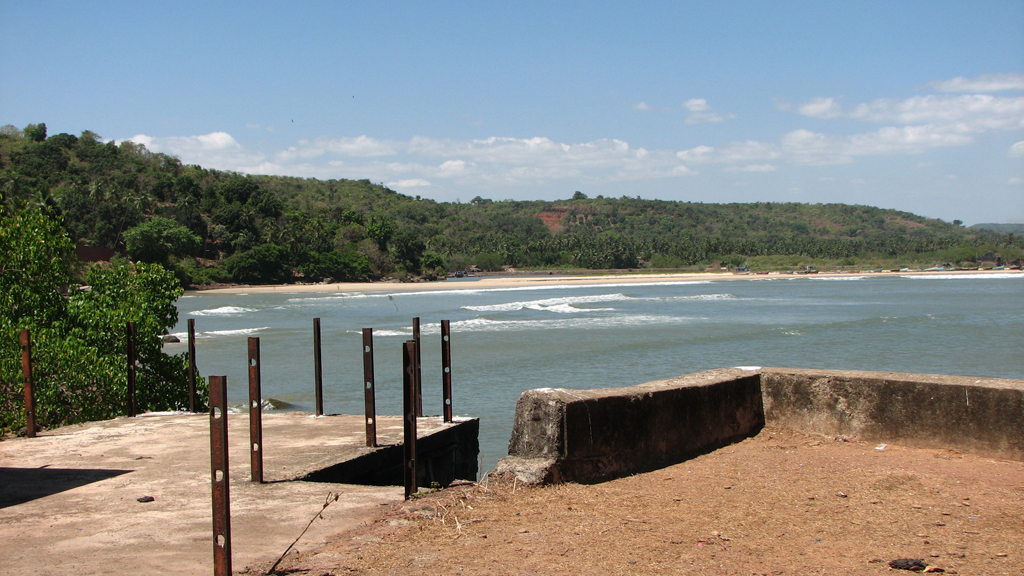
Vengurla, the serene locale where Theophilus recuperated in 1937.

Theologians down the line have also had upsets either in their seminary days or during their latter part of their career. S. J. Samartha who became Principal of Serampore College, Serampore during the 1960s endured typhoid during his seminary days in Bangalore which put him out of the seminary for nearly a year and was cared for by his parents. Similarly, G. D. Melanchthon of the United Theological College, Bangalore was stricken with paralysis during the latter part of his teaching career but the Council of the United Theological College, Bangalore through the efforts of E. C. John then Principal, D. S. Satyaranjan then Registrar of the university and G. Babu Rao a former student of E. C. John, ensured that Melanchton remained in the College Faculty Quarters in spite of his illness. As for Theophilus, given the condition that he was in, the Canadian Baptist Ministries took Theophilus under its care right from the time of his education in the mission schools, the sudden death of his parents one after the other within a span of ten days, and the time when he was stricken with tuberculosis.

In December 2014, nearly seventy years after the death of Theophilus at the portals of the Baptist Theological Seminary in Kakinada, the seminary witnessed another upset when a Baptist patriarch who was preaching at the seminary Christmas collapsed onto the pulpit and while delivering a sermon evidently at the same spot where Theophilus collapsed and died. Seminarians recall these two events, though decades apart, of the successive Baptist Patriarchs who met untimely deaths at the seminary portals and incidentally, both of them had much concern for the clergy and the seminary.

== Reminiscence ==
The Rev. T. Gnananandam writing in the Silver Jubilee Souvenir of the CBCNC in 1972 brings to light the fact that Theophilus was involved with the administration of not only the CBCNC which worked with the Telugu people but also with the other three vernacular associations in Odisha,

- The Kui language people – Kui Baptist Association (KBA),
- The Odiya language people – Utkal Baptist Churches Association (UBCA),
- The Soura language people – Soura Baptist Christian Mandali Sammilani (SBCMS),

T. Gnananandam wrote,

Theophilus was considered a very important member of the Telugu-Odiya Council. He was responsible for drafting the whole constitution of the same body. He also did a good job on the constitution of the present convention.

Academic offices
Preceded by	Professor, Baptist Theological Seminary, Kakinada, Andhra Pradesh; 1926–1946	Succeeded by
Honorary titles
Preceded by	Senator, Senate of Serampore College (University), Serampore, West Bengal; 1942–1946	Succeeded by
Preceded by D. M. David, Esquire	President, Christian Endeavour Union of India; 1939	Succeeded by
Other offices
Preceded by The Rev. R. C. Becson; 1922–1930	President, Andhra Baptist Church, Kakinada, Andhra Pradesh; 1931–1934	Succeeded by Pastor P. Premanandam; 1935–1948
