= Bethel Hospital =

Bethel Hospital, Vuyyuru

Geography
- Location: Vuyyuru 521 165, Krishna district, Andhra Pradesh, India
- Coordinates: 16°21′48″N 80°50′57″E

Organisation
- Care system: Medicare
- Type: General
- Religious affiliation: Convention of Baptist Churches of Northern Circars
- Patron: Dr. I. Esther Anandakshi (Medical Director)
- Network: Council of Christian Hospitals

History
- Founded: 1906

Bethel Hospital is a private Baptist hospital based in Vuyyuru, Krishna district, Andhra Pradesh, India. It is a member of Council of Christian Hospitals. It is perhaps the oldest hospital in the region.

== History ==
The Canadian Baptist Mission was initiated at the request of the missionary Thomas Gabriel. As a result of this, in 1868, Rev. A. V. Timpany and Rev. John McLaurin arrived in Ramayapatnam and then moved to Kakinada in 1874 after the mission itself began.

In 1904, Dr. Gertrude Hulet arrived in Vuyyuru and went on to open a dispensary in 1906. The formation of the hospital's current administrative structure was started by the Krishna district collector in 1923. A chapel was built in memory of Dr. Hulet in 1957.

What had started as a clinic in 1904 soon developed into a large hospital, taking care of patients in coastal parts of the Krishna district. A number of wards, case rooms and operating rooms were built. By 1955, hospital became a general hospital.

Evelyn Eaton started a midwifery training course in 1941 and, by 1956, it became an Auxiliary Nurse Midwives (ANMs) course. More than 500 nurses have graduated from this school.

== Membership ==
Bethel Hospital is a member of the Council of Christian Hospitals, Pithapuram, and the Christian Medical Association of India, New Delhi

The Hospital also networks and collaborates with Christian Medical College, Vellore
