= Council of Christian Hospitals =

Healthcare provider in India

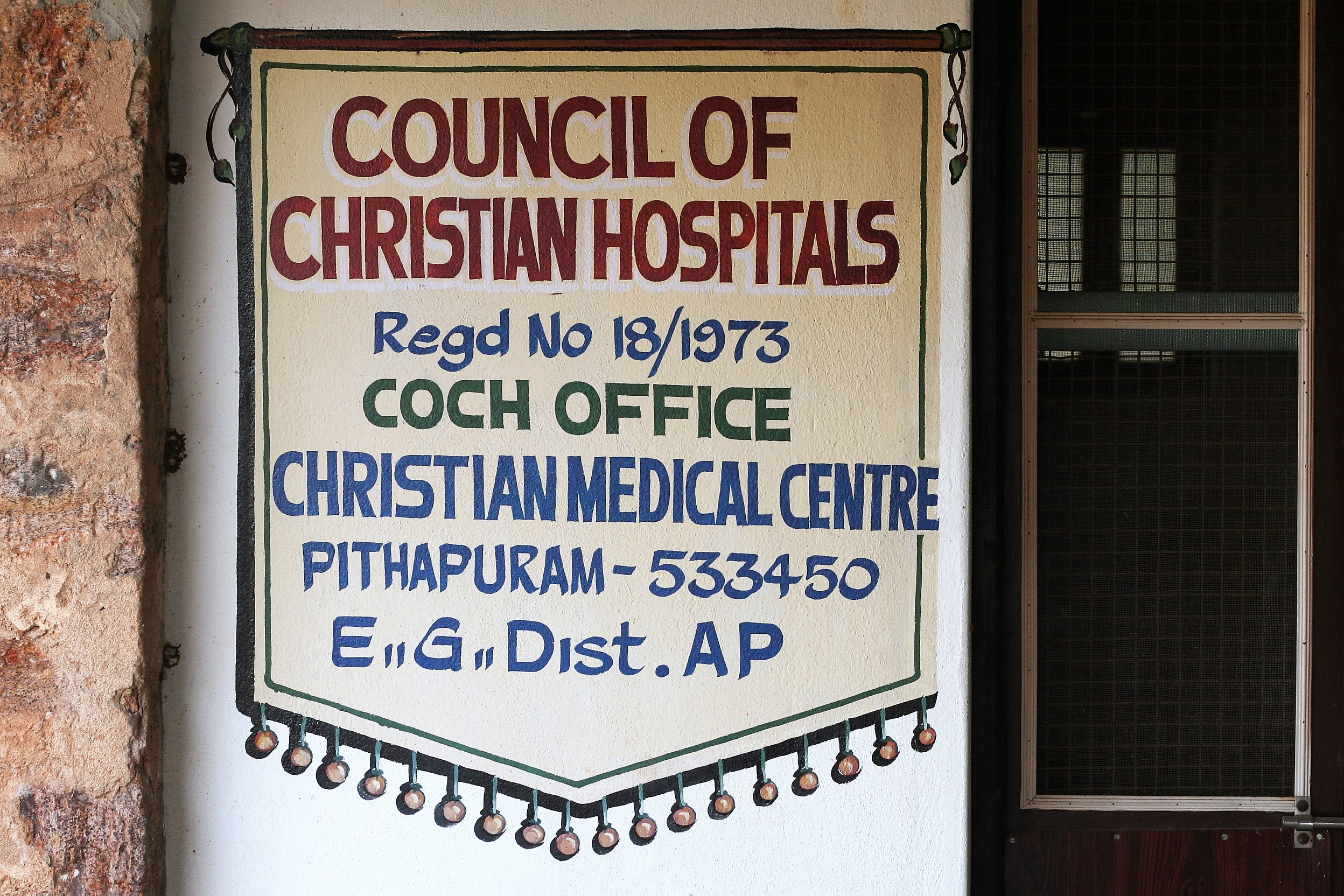
- Abbreviation: COCH
- Formation: 13 April 1973
- Founder: Canadian Baptist Mission
- Founded at: Pithapuram (Andhra Pradesh)
- Legal status: Body corporate under Indian Societies Registration Act
- Purpose: Healthcare provider
- Headquarters: Pithapuram, East Godavari District, Andhra Pradesh
- Coordinates: 17.12615°N 82.25469°E
- Region served: Odisha and Andhra Pradesh
- Members: 4 participating hospitals (2015)
- Official language: English
- Chairperson: Prof. P. Judson
- Secretary: Mr. R. Paul Jai Singh
- Affiliations: Christian Medical Association of India, New Delhi, Christian Medical College & Hospital, Vellore, Convention of Baptist Churches of Northern Circars
- Formerly called: Medical Board/Council of Institutions of Canadian Baptist Ministries

Council of Christian Hospitals (COCH) is a not-for-profit healthcare provider in India. COCH is a body corporate under Indian Societies Registration Act and has its registered office in premises of one of its participating hospitals, that is, Christian Medical Centre, Pithapuram in East Godavari District of Andhra Pradesh.

Formed on 13 April 1973, COCH sets an annual agenda in line with its missionary endeavor to serve the poor and needy. In terms of continuing education, COCH is a members of the Christian Medical College & Hospital, Vellore, where two office bearers of COCH-the Chairperson and the Secretary-participate in the Annual General Meeting of the Association of Christian Medical College & Hospital in Vellore. As a sponsoring body, COCH also communicates with members of churches founded by the Canadian Baptist Mission inviting applications for possible sponsorship from eligible students to study health-related courses at the Christian Medical College & Hospital in Vellore.

COCH is represented at ecumenical forums as a member of Christian Medical Association of India, an affiliated institution of National Council of Churches in India.

== History ==
Baptist missionaries from Canada first came to Ramayapatnam in 1868 in southern Andhra Pradesh working along with American Baptist missionaries. On invitation extended by Indian Missionary, Thomas Gabriel who was involved in propagating Gospel in parts of East Godavari, West Godavari and Krishna districts along northern coastal line of Andhra Pradesh. Canadian Baptist Mission began sending Missionaries to India in 1874 to partner with Thomas Gabriel. Apart from Church-related ministries of evangelism and leadership training, there was also development ministries that included aiding people in agricultural, health and educational development.

In addition to intervention among Telugus in Andhra Pradesh, the missionaries also covered southern Odisha working among Soura, Kui and Odiya and later in 1922, Serango Christian Hospital was opened in Gajapati District, Odisha.

William Gordon Carder, formerly Professor of Church History at Andhra Christian Theological College, Hyderabad wrote that it was Dr. E. G. Smith who could be termed as first Medical Missionary from Canadian Baptist Mission who was sent to India in 1894. During the ensuing years', a total of eight hospitals were founded by Canadian Baptist Mission.

== Legal status ==
During latter half of nineteenth century, Missionaries entrusted leadership to their co-partners, the Indians, resulting in formation of Convention of Baptist Churches of Northern Circars (CBCNC) which had also Educational, Theological, and Medical Committees. However, it was felt that Medical Committee be made autonomous and all medical institutions needed to be safeguarded and continued to be managed without any hindrances. Therefore, Canadian Baptist Ministries, with bona fide motives entrusted properties of medical institutions founded by it to the custody of Evangelical Trust Association of South India (ETASI), Bangalore (Karnataka). Further, on 13 April 1973, COCH was formed as an autonomous body to manage medical ministries of Canadian Baptist Ministries.

== Members ==
Participating institutions of Council of Christian Hospitals
| Founding year | Name of Institution | Location | District | State |
|---|---|---|---|---|
| 1898 | Star of Hope Hospital | Akiveedu | West Godavari District | Andhra Pradesh |
| 1904 | Christian Medical Centre | Pithapuram | East Godavari District | Andhra Pradesh |
| 1906 | Bethel Hospital | Vuyyuru | Krishna District | Andhra Pradesh |
| 1928 | Serango Christian Hospital | Serango | Gajapati district | Odisha |
