= Chetty Bhanumurthy =

Telugu hymnwriter and theologian (1988–1973)

The Reverend Chetty Bhanumurthy, CBCNC
- Born: February 23, 1888; Cocanada (Madras Presidency)
- Died: January 6, 1973 (aged 84); Andhra Pradesh
- Education: Teacher Training Course, L.Th. (Serampore)
- Alma mater: CBM-Cocanada Girls' Boarding School, Kakinada (Madras Presidency); CBM-Samalkota Boys' School, Samalkot (Madras Presidency); Pithapuram Rajah College, Kakinada (Madras Presidency); Serampore College, Serampore (Bengal Presidency) (1915–1918)
- Years active: 1912–1973
- Known for: Lyrical compositions in Telugu Christian Hymnal
- Religion: Christianity
- Church: Canadian Baptist Mission/Convention of Baptist Churches of Northern Circars
- Congregations served: CBM-Andhra Baptist Church, Kakinada (1913–1914/1918–1919)
- Offices held: Spiritual Formator, ABM-Ramayapatnam Baptist Theological Seminary, Ramayapatnam (1920–1928); Spiritual Formator/Principal, CBM-Baptist Theological Seminary, Kakinada (1928–1952/1952–1955)

Chetty Bhanumurthy (born February 23, 1888; died January 6, 1973) was an Indian hymn writer whose hymns are found in the Hymnal in Telugu. He was also a Baptist pastor, a teacher and a college principal.

== Studies ==
In 1915, Bhanumurthy discerned his avocation towards priesthood and decided to study for ministerial formation at the Serampore College, Serampore, a constituent college of the nation's first university. Bhanumurthy studied up to 1918, during the Principalship of George Howells. He was a candidate of the Canadian Baptist Mission/Convention of Baptist Churches of Northern Circars and he obtained a Licentiate in Theology (L.Th.).

== Theological teacher ==
Bhanumurthy was a pastor of the Canadian Baptist Mission/Convention of Baptist Churches of Northern Circars in Andhra Pradesh. He also led the Principalship of the Baptist Theological Seminary, Kakinada from 1945 to 1956 leading to its affiliation to the nation's first university, Senate of Serampore College (University) in 1946.

Bhanumurthy taught at the Ramayapatnam Baptist Theological Seminary in Ramayapatnam and later on moved to Kakinada where he taught at the Baptist Theological Seminary in Kakinada along with Muthyala Theophilus. During this time A. B. Masilamani joined the seminary for spiritual formation. In 1952, Bhanumurthy became principal of the seminary; he was succeeded three years later by Masilamani.

== Hymns ==
Comparative religion scholar R. R. Sundara Rao, who researched at the University of Wisconsin–Madison, highlighted Bhanumurthy's literary standard, terming him as a pioneer hymn writer whose songs had the element of Bhakti. The Old Testament scholar, Victor Premasagar, was also enthused by the lyrical content in Bhanumurthy's compositions, especially Hymn Number 94 titled Yesuku Samanulevaru (Translated Who is equal to you Lord?) with direct reference to Psalm 71:19 and strikingly similar to Tyagaraja's composition in Kharaharapriya. Dayanandan Francis brings Bhanumurthy in the line of another Hymn writer, Puroshottam Choudhary and writes:

Like Choudari, Bhanumurti also is interested in picking up ideas, thought-forms and even ragas from popular Hindu poems and lyrics, while at the same time endeavouring to broaden the perspectives found in such religious literary forms with distinctive Christian ideas.

Roger E. Hedlund, the Missiologist writes that along with the Bible, the Christian Hymnal in Telugu also forms the main bulwark of Christian spiritual life for the Telugu folk and of equal use to both the non-literates and the literates as well. In such a context, it is noteworthy that sixteen of Bhanumurthy's compositions are found in the Christian Hymnal in Telugu with the following sequence:

- 9, Stuti Geethamu,
- 84, Neeti Suryudu,
- 87, Kreesthuku Namo Namo,
- 92, Yesu Sharanu,
- 94, Yesuku Samanulevaru,
- 116, Raraju Janmadinamu,
- 198, Siluva Balamu,
- 201, Yesu Shanthikarudu,
- 263, Kreesthu Sanghamunaku Sirassu,
- 361, Yesunaku Sakshulu,
- 406, Kreesthuni Vembadinchuta,
- 514, Kutumbaradhana,
- 522, Melukolupu,
- 524, Kraistava Yuvajanulara Kreesthu Koraku Nelavandi,
- 552, Abhinaya Christmas Geethamu,
- 579, Kruthagnathala Panduga

Academic offices
Preceded by Archibald Gordon, CBM; 1945-1952	Principal, CBM-Baptist Theological Seminary, Kakinada; 1952-1955	Succeeded by A. B. Masilamani, CBCNC; 1955-1958
Religious titles
Preceded by M. Venkata Reddy, CBCNC 1912; T. Israel Raju, CBCNC, 1915–1917	Parish Priest, CBM-Andhra Baptist Church, Kakinada; 1913-1914, 1918-1919	Succeeded by T. Israel Raju, CBCNC, 1915-1917; D. Jeevaratnam, CBCNC 1920-1927
