= Serango Christian Hospital =

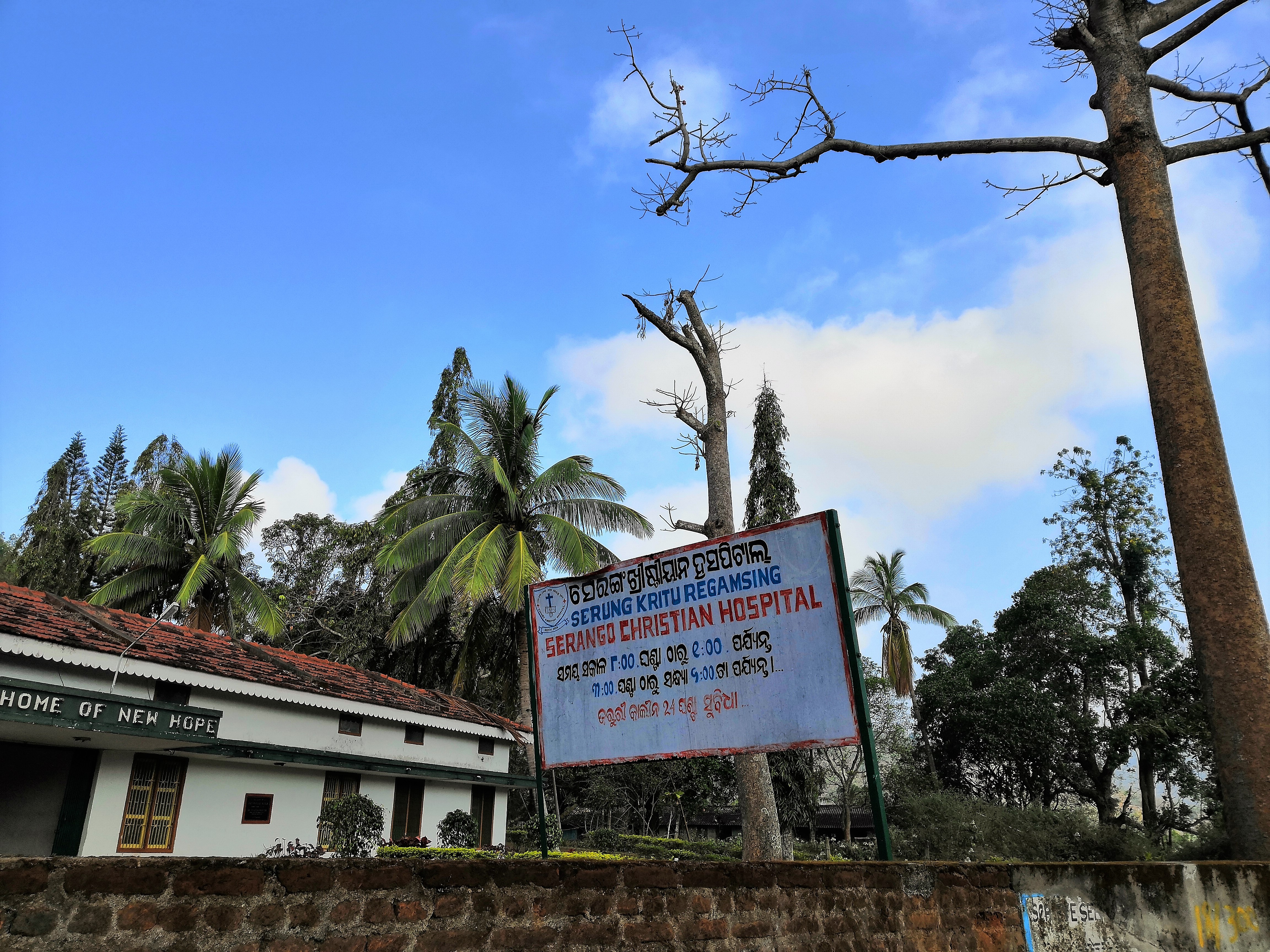

Geography
- Location: Serango 761 206, Gajapati District, Odisha, India
- Coordinates: 19°N 84°E

Organisation
- Care system: Medicare
- Type: General
- Religious affiliation: Convention of Baptist Churches of Northern Circars
- Patron: Dr. Helen Nirmala Rao (Medical Director)
- Network: Council of Christian Hospitals

Services
- Beds: 65

History
- Founded: March 14, 1928

Serango Christian Hospital is a private Baptist hospital based in Serango, Gajapati District, Odisha, India. It is a member of Council of Christian Hospitals, a not-for-profit healthcare provider in India.

== History ==
It was the outcome of missions of Canadian Baptist Mission who set foot in 1876 with arrival of The Reverend William F. Armstrong and subsequently established a mission station on the hills in Serango. In 1928, it became a hospital.

== Memberships ==
CBM Serango Christian Hospital is a member of,

- Council of Christian Hospitals,Pithapuram, Andhra Pradesh,
- Christian Medical Association of India, New Delhi Hospital also networks with Christian Medical College, Vellore
