= Star of Hope Hospital =

Star of Hope Hospital, Akiveedu

Geography
- Location: Akiveedu 534 235, West Godavari District, Andhra Pradesh, India
- Coordinates: 16.6000°N 81.3833°E

Organisation
- Care system: Medicare
- Type: General
- Religious affiliation: Convention of Baptist Churches of Northern Circars
- Patron: Vacant (Medical Director)
- Network: Council of Christian Hospitals; Christian Medical College, Vellore

History
- Founded: 1898

Links
- Lists: Hospitals in India

Star of Hope Hospital is a private Baptist hospital based in Akiveedu, West Godavari District, Andhra Pradesh, India. It is a member of Council of Christian Hospitals.

== History ==
Star of Hope Hospital was founded by Canadian Baptist Mission in 1898 due to initiative of pioneer medical missionaries.

== Memberships ==
Star of Hope Hospital is a member of:

- Council of Christian Hospitals, Pithapuram
- Christian Medical Association of India, New Delhi

Hospital also networks with the Christian Medical College, Vellore
