= Star of Hope =

Star of Hope may refer to:

- Star of Hope Hospital, a Christian healthcare facility in Andhra Pradesh, India.
- Star of Hope Lodge, an art gallery in Maine.
- Star of Hope (newspaper), a publication formed in 1899 by prison inmates in New York State
