= Gordon Barss =

Gordon Barss may refer to:

- Gordon Dewolfe Barss (1916–2010), Baptist missionary
- Gordon Payzant Barss (1885–1969), Canadian Baptist missionary
