= Baptist Theological Seminary (India) =

Baptist Theological Seminary, Kakinada
- Seminary
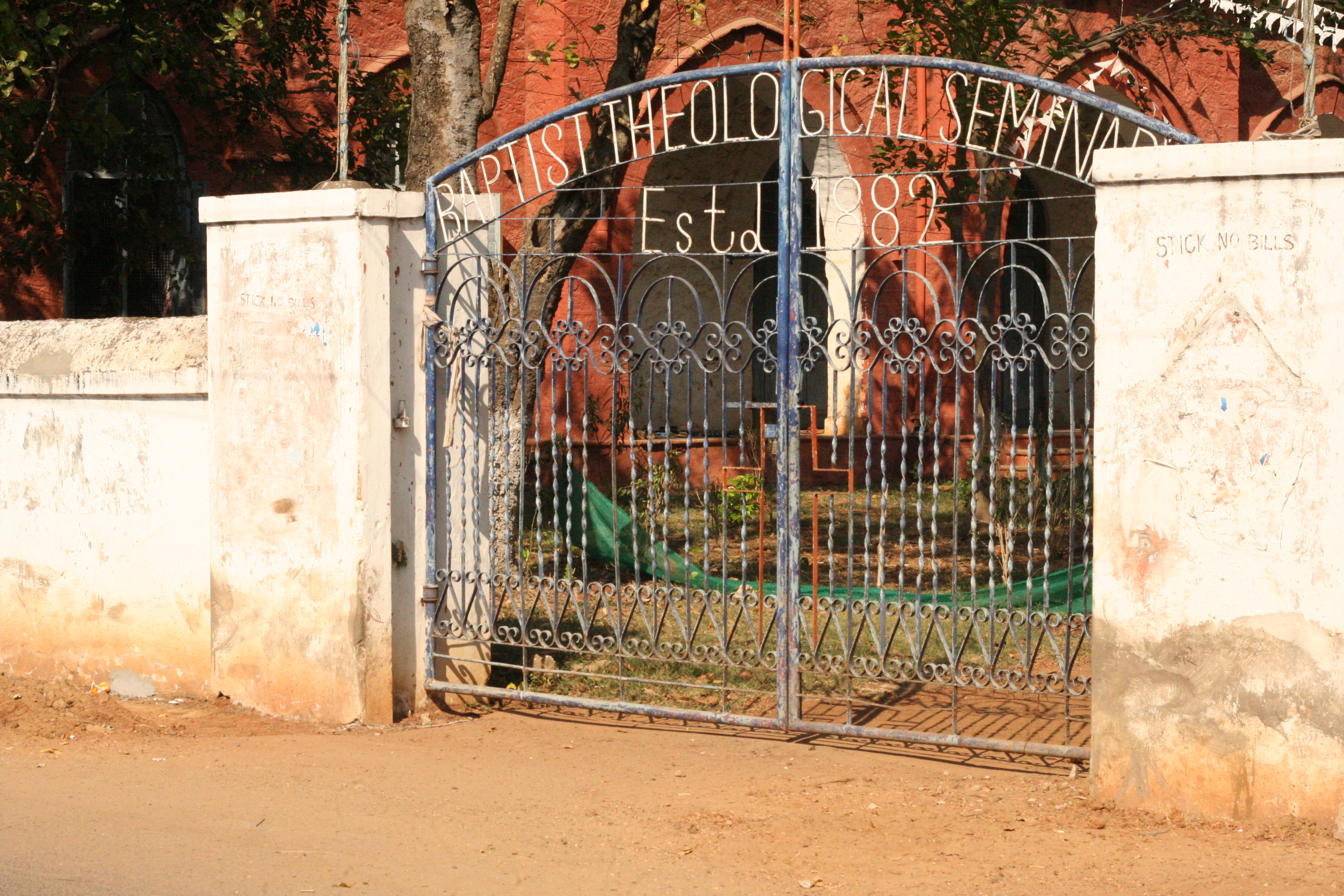
- The Baptist Theological Seminary, Jagannaikpur, Kakinada
- Type: Baptist Seminary
- Established: 2 October 1882; 143 years ago
- Affiliations: Convention of Baptist Churches of Northern Circars
- Dean: The Reverend K. J. Emmanuel, CBCNC (Chairperson of the Seminary Council)
- Principal: Rev. K. Ranjit Kumar, CBCNC
- Academic staff: 3+
- Location: Church Square, Jagannaickpur, Kakinada 533 002, Kakinada district, Andhra Pradesh, India; 16°56′15″N 82°14′18″E

Baptist Theological Seminary is a Baptist seminary located in Jagannaickpur, Church Square, Kakinada, Andhra Pradesh, India. It is affiliated with the Convention of Baptist Churches of Northern Circars.

== History ==
The Seminary was founded in Samalkot in 1882 by the Canadian Baptist Mission, under the stewardship of the John McLaurin. In 1912, the Seminary was shifted from Samalkot to Kakinada. However, in 1920, the Seminary closed and was merged with the Ramayapatnam Baptist Theological Seminary and a joint faculty comprising the American Baptists and the Canadian Baptists began taking classes. In 1928, the Seminary was reopened in Kakinada and the faculty were recalled from Ramayapatnam.

In the beginning, in 1949, the seminary was affiliated to the Senate of Serampore College (University). However, with the formation of the Andhra Christian Theological College (ACTC) in 1964, the seminary began sending its students for Bachelor of Theology and Bachelor of Divinity to ACTC. After the formation of ACTC, an ecumenical seminary in Rajahmundry in 1964, the BTS got itself amalgamated into it in 1964 for Senate approved courses. The BTS began offering self-managed and operated Graduate of Theology courses under the seal of the Seminary Council since then.

In 1964 the Seminary moved to Rajahmundry in the campus of the Lutheran Theological Seminary. With the formation of the ecumenical seminary – Andhra Christian Theological College in 1964, the B.Th. and B.D. classes were moved in 1964 to it while the Seminary retained the stand-alone diploma courses.

The BTS was upgraded from S. Th to B. Th in August 2015.

== Members of faculty ==
=== Present (resident and visiting) ===
- The Rev. N. Leela Grace, CBCNC, Faculty member,
- The Rev. B. Devasahayam, CBCNC, Faculty member,
- The Rev. B. Theophilus, CBCNC, Faculty member,
- The Rev. Vara Joseph Deepak Raj Kumar, CBCNC, Faculty member,
- The Rev. K. Ranjit Kumar, CBCNC, Faculty member and Principal,
- The Rev. P. V. Raja Babu, CBCNC, Faculty member

=== Past ===
==== Resident ====
- Prof. M. Theophilus, CBCNC,
- The Rev. B. Arjuna Rao, CBCNC,
- The Rev. T. Theophilus, CBCNC,
- The Rev. C. Bhanumurthi, CBCNC,
- The Rev. A. B. Masilamani, CBCNC,
- The Rev. G. Noah Raju, CBCNC,
- The Rev. G. S. Albert Ezekiel, CBCNC,
- The Rev. K. P. Israel, CBCNC,
- The Rev. I. Samuel, CBCNC,
- The Rev. C. L. Timpany, CBM
- The Rev. J. I. Richardson, CBM

==== Visiting ====
- The Rev. K. David, CBCNC,
- The Rev. G. Babu Rao, CBCNC,
- The Rev. D. J. Jeremiah, CBCNC,
- The Rev. K. D. G. Prakasa Rao, CBCNC,
- The Rev. Paul Carter, CBM

== Succession of seminary principals ==
Sl. No	Name	Tenure	Domicile	Earned academic credentials
1.	The Rev. John McLaurin, CBM	1882-1887	Canada	B.A. (Canadian Literary Institute)
2.	The Rev. H. E. Stillwell, CBM	1888-1898	Canada	B. A.
3.	The Rev. John Craig, CBM	1899-1905	Canada	B. A. (Toronto)
4.	The Rev. H. B. Cross, CBM	1912-1920	Canada	B. A.
5.	The Rev. J. B. McLaurin, CBM	1926-1939	Canada	B.A., B.Th. M. A.
6.	The Rev. Gordon P. Barss, CBM	1939-1945	Canada	B. A. (Acadia), B.D. (Rochester)
7.	The Rev. Archibald Gordon, CBM	1945-1952	Canada	B. A. (Brandon), B. Th., (Brandon), B. D. (Toronto)
8.	The Rev. C. Bhanumurthy, CBCNC	1952-1955	India	L.Th. (Serampore)
9.	The Rev. A. B. Masilamani, CBCNC	1955-1958	India	L. Th. (Serampore), B. D. (Serampore), M.A. (Calcutta), Th.M. (Toronto), PhD (Osmania)
10.	The Rev. Waldo Penner, CBM	1958-1964	Canada	B. A. (McMaster), B. D. (Berkeley), M. Th. (Berkeley)
11.	The Rev. Victor Hahn, CBM	1964-1966	Canada	B. A. (McMaster), B. D. (McMaster), S.T.M. (ANTS)
12.	The Rev. Paul Antrobus, CBM	1966-1968	Canada	B. A. (Brandon), B. D. (McMaster), PhD (Waterloo)
13.	The Rev. T. Gnananandam, CBCNC	1968-1969	India	B. D. (Serampore), M. A. (Calcutta)
14.	The Rev. Gordon D. Barss, CBM	1975-1977	Canada	B. A. (Acadia), B. D. (ANTS)
15.	The Rev. S. E. Krupa Rao, CBCNC	1977-1979	India	L. Th. (Serampore), B. D. (Serampore), S.T.M. (UTS)
16.	The Rev. Gordon D. Barss, CBM	1979-1980	Canada	B. A. (Acadia), B. D. (ANTS)
17.	The Rev. S. E. Krupa Rao, CBCNC	1980-1993	India	L. Th. (Serampore), B. D. (Serampore), S.T.M. (UTS)
18.	The Rev. C. L. Johnson, CBCNC	1993-2014	India	BSc (Andhra), B. D. (Serampore)
19.	The Rev. P. V. Raja Babu, CBCNC	2014-2018	India	B. A. (Andhra), B.D. (Serampore)
20.	The Rev. K. Ranjit Kumar, CBCNC	2018–	India	B. Com. (Andhra), B. D. (Serampore), M. Th (Serampore)

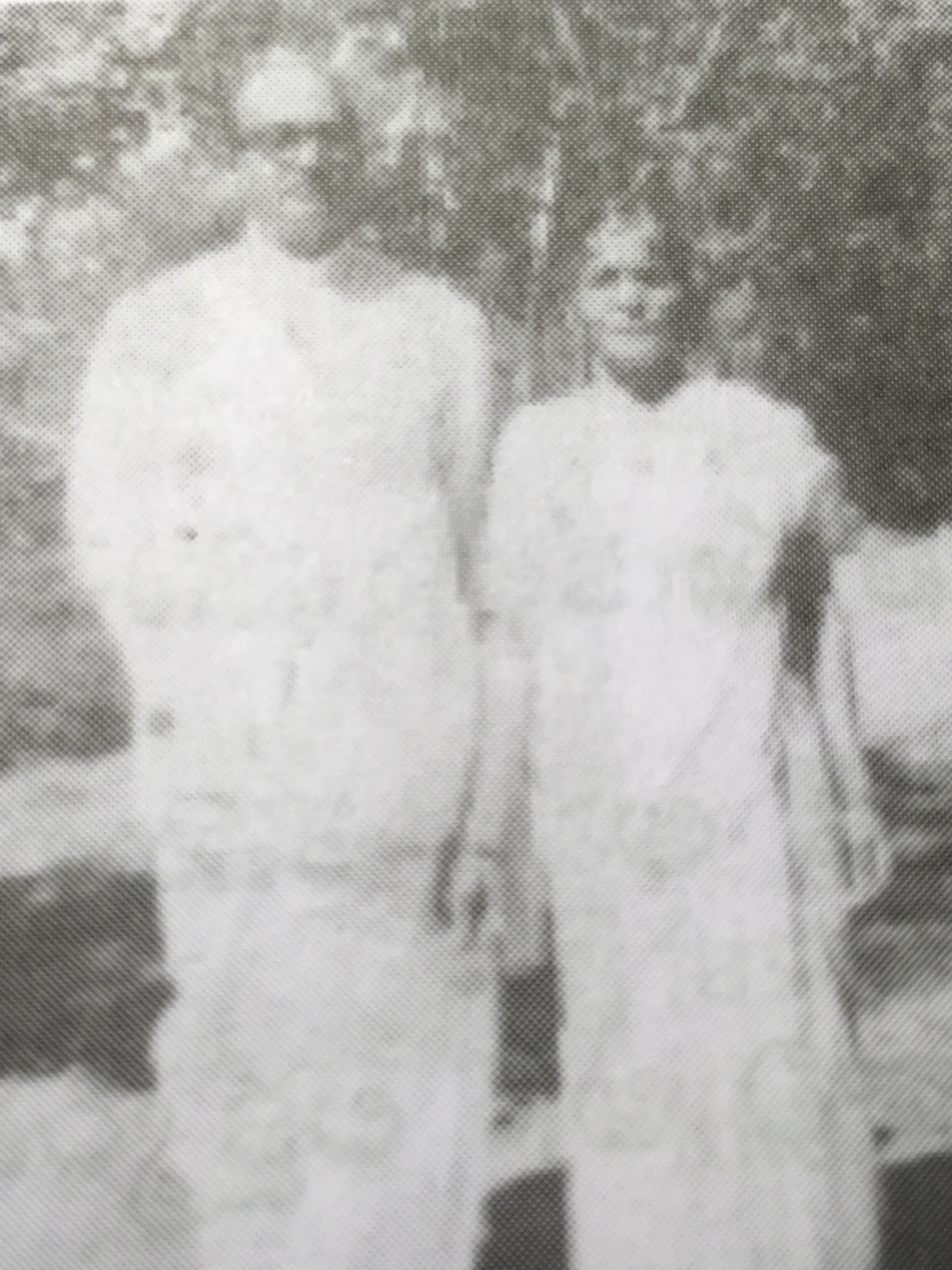
BTS Alumni: The Rev. P. V. George & Mrs. Dhimathamma (ca 1926–1929)

== See also ==
- Eva Rose York Bible Training and Technical School for Women, Tuni
- Canadian Baptist Ministries, Canada
- Convention of Baptist Churches of Northern Circars
- Andhra Christian Theological College, Secunderabad, Andhra Pradesh
- Senate of Serampore College (University), Serampore, West Bengal
