= Christian Medical Centre =

Christian hospital in India

Christian Medical Centre, Pithapuram
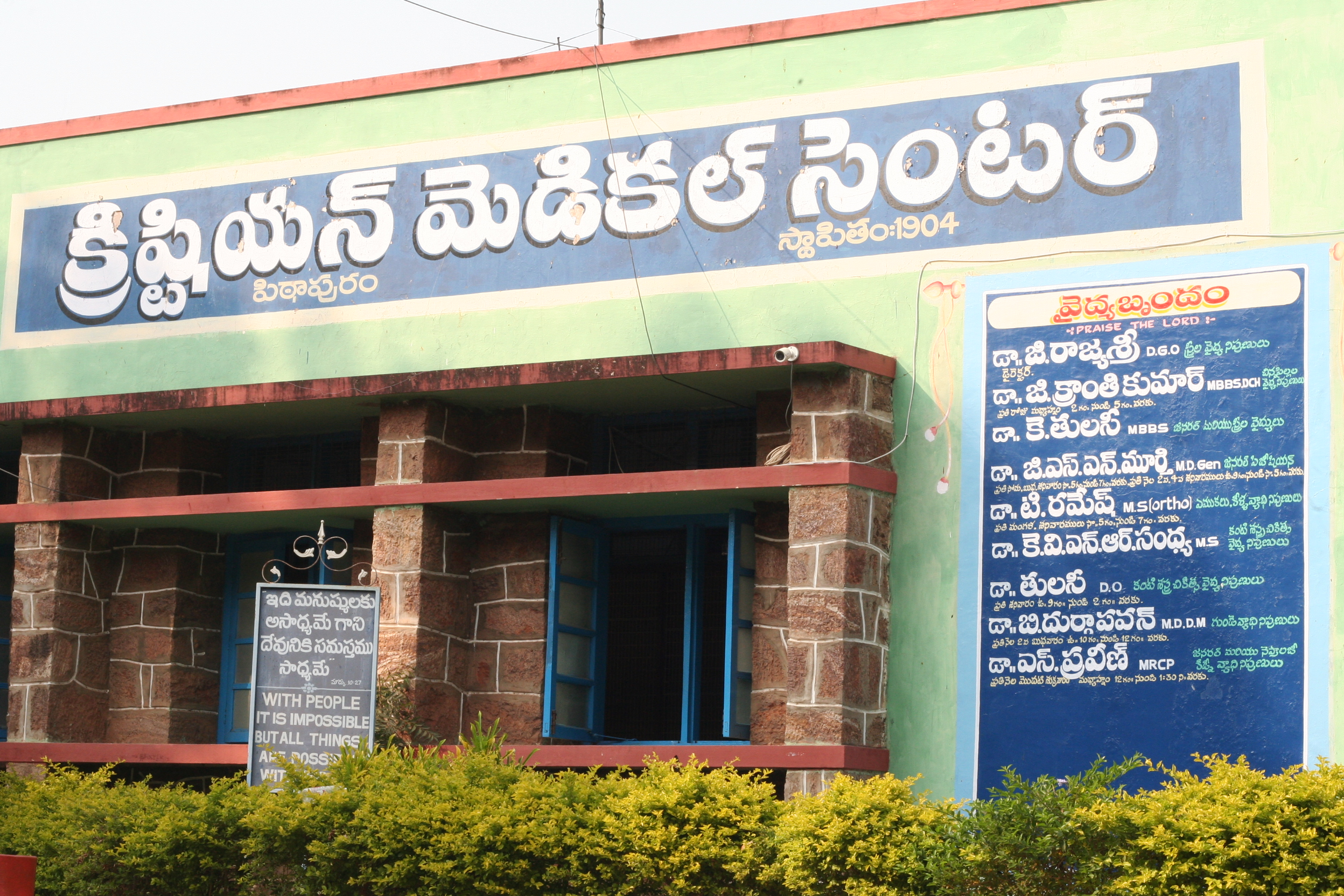
- Medical Centre

Geography
- Location: Pithapuram 533 450, Kakinada district, Andhra Pradesh, India
- Coordinates: 17.1167°N 82.2667°E

Organisation
- Care system: Medicare
- Type: General
- Religious affiliation: Convention of Baptist Churches of Northern Circars
- Patron: Dr. Y. Amruth Lal (Medical Director)
- Network: Council of Christian Hospitals

History
- Founded: 1904

Links
- Lists: Hospitals in India

Christian Medical Centre is a private Baptist hospital based in Pithapuram, Kakinada district, Andhra Pradesh, India. It is a member of Council of Christian Hospitals.

== History ==
In 1900, Dr. E. Smith of Yelamanchili, first medical missionary of Canadian Baptist Mission, made a tour in Pithapuram area. In 1904, he began construction of a Medical Centre in Pithapuram. Buildings opened in February 1908. Dr. Smith went on furlough in 1910, Dr. Jessie Allyn who came in his place once went to Palace of Raja of Pithapuram to attend to the Rani, who delivered a child. In honour, Rani of Pithapuram bestowed grants to build an exclusive hospital for women and children near the existing hospital.

== Memberships ==
Christian Medical Centre is a member of:

- Council of Christian Hospitals, Pithapuram
- Christian Medical Association of India, New Delhi

The hospital also networks with the Christian Medical College, Vellore.
