= Gordon Dewolfe Barss =

Canadian Baptist missionary

The Reverend G. D. Barss, CBM D. D. Honoris causa (Acadia)
- Born: Gordon Dewolfe Barss; 13 February 1916; Pithapuram, East Godavari district, Madras Presidency (India)
- Died: 14 December 2010 (aged 94); Dartmouth, Nova Scotia, (Canada)
- Citizenship: Canadian
- Education: B.A. (Acadia); B.D. (ANTS)
- Alma mater: in Asia; Kodaikanal International School, Dundigal, Tamil Nadu (India); in North America; Horton Academy, Wolfville, Kings County, Nova Scotia (Canada); Acadia University, Wolfville, Kings County, Nova Scotia (Canada) (1933-1936); Andover Newton Theological School, Newton, Massachusetts (United States) (1951)
- Occupations: Ecclesiastical Administrator and Pastor
- Years active: 1939-1980 in India
- Religion: Christianity
- Church: Canadian Baptist Ministries
- Ordained: 1938
- Writings: 1949, The early eastward spread of Christianity
- Offices held: Principal, Baptist Theological Seminary, Kakinada (India), (1975-1977)
- Title: The Reverend

Gordon Dewolfe Barss (1916 – 2010) was a Baptist missionary who served in India during 1939-1980 through the Canadian Baptist Ministries.

== Early life and studies ==
Dewolfe Barss was born in at the Christian Medical Centre, Pithapuram in 1939 and later schooled at the Kodaikanal International School in Tamil Nadu. For graduate studies in theology, Dewolfe moved to Canada where he took a B.A. in theology from the Acadia University in 1936. In 1938, Dewolfe was ordained as a Baptist Pastor by the Canadian Baptist Ministries following which he returned to India to serve as a missionary in Andhra Pradesh and Odisha. After a decade of missionary service in India, Dewolfe Barss upgraded his academics by enrolling in a Bachelor of Divinity programme at the Andover Newton Theological School, Andover during 1949-1951 and again returned to India to resume his ecclesiastical responsibilities with the Canadian Baptist Ministries.

== Ecclesiastical career ==
When the Baptist Theological Seminary, Kakinada was revived in 1975, Dewolfe Barss took up the Principalship of the Seminary and led the administration for two successive academic years following which the Seminary Council of the Baptist Theological Seminary appointed S. E. Krupa Rao in 1977 to take over the Principalship from Dewolfe Barss. After serving in India until 1980, Barss settled down in Canada. During 1989–1990, Barss volunteered as a missionary to Kenya.

== Honours ==
In 1992, the Acadia University honoured Dewolfe Barss with a Doctor of Divinity degree by honoris causa.

Academic offices
Preceded by Rev. T. Gnananandam; 1968-1969	Principal, Baptist Theological Seminary, Kakinada (India); 1975-1977	Succeeded by Rev. S. E. Krupa Rao; 1977-1993
