= None the Less =

- Origin: Watford, Hertfordshire, England, UK
- Genres: Stoner rock, post-hardcore, hard rock
- Years active: 2007 - 2011
- Label: Irony Records
- Members: Anthony Giannacini; Owen Harvey; Joe Page; Oli Stanton; Mike Smith
- Website: Official Website

None the Less was an English band from Watford, Hertfordshire who originally formed in 2007.

They have released one single Define, one album The Way to Save Ourselves (released May 2009) and an EP Keep Your Hands To Yourself.

The band have played hundreds of shows since their formation, including festivals such as the 2008 Underage Festival, the '3style Festival' 2008, the Camden Crawl, and the 2009 Download Festival.

== History ==
None the Less were originally formed by Anthony Giannaccini, Owen Harvey and Oli Stanton who met while attending Bushey Meads School. Their original drummer, Jack Kenny, was with them up until 2008 and was later replaced by Mike Smith. Guitarist Joe Page, joined in 2007 after his previous band Ryoko separated.

The band's name comes from Anthony's brother's band, who were doing session work and didn't continue as None the Less.

The first 5 track EP titled 'Keep Your Hands To Yourself' was released in 2007 and included crowd favourites such as Four 4's and Mickey Bath. A music video for the single ‘Define’ was released in May 2009, produced by Lawrence Hardy, who has also produced music videos for bands such as You Me At Six and We Are The Ocean.

They played many local and smaller venues throughout 2007, then in 2008/9 began playing larger venues such as the Camden Underworld. They performed at the O2 Carling Academy Islington 2 on 30 May 2009 with Telegraphs supporting In Case of Fire.

The band also won the chance to play a set for the Red Bull Bedroom Jam website after uploading a video for their song Just This Once.

The single "Define" was played on Scuzz TV after its release and they were interviewed on BBC Three Counties Radio, which you can hear on their MySpace, as well as having their songs "Just This Once" and the single "Define" played on Kerrang! radio. The latter which you can also hear on their website. They have also appeared in Kerrang! magazine.

They are due to record their first full-length album between mid June and early July.

== Present and future ==
Their album was released on 25 May 2009, and was also made available to download from iTunes. The band also toured that summer with Young Guns around the UK. At that year's Download Festival, the band received a reception of about 700 people and were rated 4 out of 5 Ks by Kerrang! magazine for their set. They appeared on the Download 2009 Set List under the 'Red Bull Bedroom Jam' stage.

The band recorded their debut album at Glasseye Studios in Hatfield, entitled Time, The Healer, which was planned for release in March 2011. The band then plan to tour the UK at Easter in support of the album.

In January 2011 the band decided to split up. They will continue to release the full-length album for free, one song from the album on the first of every month at www.facebook.com/nonethelessonline

== Members ==
- Anthony Giannacini – lead vocals
- Owen Harvey – guitar, screamer and backing vocals
- Joe Page – guitar and backing vocals
- Oli Stanton – bass guitar
- Mike Smith – drums

Previous members:

- Jack Kenny – drums

== Discography ==
=== Studio albums ===
- Time, The Healer (2011)
- The Way to Save Ourselves (2009)

=== Demo EPs ===
- Keep Your Hands to Yourself (2007)

Track Listing

1. We Went For [Jeremy]
2. Just This Once
3. Four Fours
4. Mickey Bath
5. Eliminate the Break Inn

== Reception ==
The band have had many positive reviews in magazines, such as Kerrang! and on the internet.

- "In reality, None the Less are the next Big One. In a few years they will explode all over the progressive metal scene, creating a frenzy Muse would be proud of." - Virtual Festivals
- "None the Less aren't a well known name, but their set lives up to their dramatic, impressive entrance." - Kerrang! - KKKK (4 K's live Download Festival 2009 review)

== Trivia ==
There is a secret track at the end of "Eliminate The Break Inn" on the band's first EP.
