= Victor David Hahn =

The Reverend Victor David Hahn CBM
- Born: Victor David Hahn
- Education: McMaster University (B.Div.), Andover Newton Theological School (S.T.M.)
- Occupations: Ecclesiastical Administrator and Pastor
- Years active: 1955–1968 in India

Ecclesiastical career
- Religion: Christianity
- Church: Canadian Baptist Ministries
- Ordained: 1953
- Writings: 1953, Christianity and Communism
- Offices held: Principal, Baptist Theological Seminary, Kakinada, (1964–1966)
- Title: The Reverend

Victor David Hahn was a missionary who served in India during 1955–1968 through the Canadian Baptist Ministries.

Hahn pursued theological studies at the McMaster University taking a Bachelor of Divinity in 1953. For postgraduate studies, Hahn studied at the Andover Newton Theological School where he took an Master of Theology

== Career ==
=== India ===
During Hahn's ministry in Andhra Pradesh, India during 1955–1968, he served as a Baptist missionary along the coast of Andhra Pradesh in the Churches of the Convention of Baptist Churches of Northern Circars and later became Principal of the residual Baptist Theological Seminary, Kakinada during 1964–1966 succeeding Waldo Penner. After a two-year stint at the Seminary, Victor Hahn resigned in 1966 citing health reasons leading to the appointment of Paul Antrobus by the Seminary Council of the Baptist Theological Seminary, Kakinada.

=== Canada ===
Hahn left India in 1968 and continued to serve the Canadian Baptist Ministries and was in charge of missionary housing in Hamilton and Ontario. Hahn later settled at Oakville, Ontario and also taught elementary students (grades 3 to 5) at Oakwood Public School, Oakville where his methods of teaching inspired many. One among his students was Amir Hussain who acknowledges the inspiration from the elementary school classes taught by Victor Hahn.

Academic offices
Preceded by Rev. Dr. Waldo Penner; 1958–1964	Principal, Baptist Theological Seminary, Kakinada; 1964–1966	Succeeded by Rev. Paul Antrobus; 1966–1968
