= Time, the Healer =

Time, The Healer

Studio album by None the Less
- Released: 2011
- Recorded: Glasseye Studios; Hatfield, UK; June–July 2010
- Genre: Stoner rock, hard rock, post-hardcore
- Length: 35mins
- Label: Irony Records
- Producer: Dan Lancaster

None the Less chronology
The Way To Save Ourselves (2009)	Time, The Healer (2011)

Time, The Healer is a 10 track debut album by None the Less which was released track-by-track over the course of ten months in 2011. The album was recorded at Glasseye Studios in Hatfield and was engineered by Dan Lancaster.

== Track listing ==
1. "Concrete Souls"
2. "Disconnected"
3. "Bitter Taste"
4. "Hurricanes"
5. "Out Of Reach"
6. "This Is The End"
7. "The Jury"
8. "Turn The Lights Off"
9. "Last Goodbye"
10. "Drive Away"

== Personnel ==
- Anthony Giannacini – Vocals
- Owen Harvey – Guitar, Screams and Backing Vocals
- Joe Page – Guitar, Backing Vocals
- Oli Stanton – Bass
- Mike Smith – Drums

== Singles ==
Information
Bitter Taste
- Released: 15 December 2010

Released as a free single/video on Punktastic
