= The Way to Save Ourselves =

EP by None the Less

The Way To Save Ourselves

EP by None the Less
- Released: 25 May 2009 (United Kingdom)
- Recorded: EAS Studios; Milton Keynes, UK; 2008-2009
- Genres: Post-hardcore, Stoner rock, Hard rock
- Label: Irony Records
- Producer: Ed Sokolowski

None the Less chronology
Keep Your Hands To Yourself EP (2007)	The Way To Save Ourselves (2009)

Professional ratings
Review scores
Source	Rating
Leeds Music Scene	3.5/5 stars
Punktastic	4/5 stars
Room Thirteen	9/13 stars
Shout for Music	4/5 stars
Thrash Hits	4/6 stars

The Way To Save Ourselves is an EP by None the Less which was released on 25 May 2009. The album was recorded at EAS Studios in Milton Keynes and was produced by Ed Sokolowski.

One reviewer praised the album for its riffs, but criticized its abrupt transitions in style. Another praised its originality among British nu-skool metal bands, specifically noting the background melodies.

== Track listing ==
1. "The Payout"
2. "News of a Cancer"
3. "Define"
4. "(Interlude)..."
5. "I Had The World Resting on Me"
6. "Four 4's"
7. "I'll Feel Like Your Enemy"

== Personnel ==
- Anthony Giannacini – vocals
- Owen Harvey – guitar, screams and backing vocals
- Joe Page – guitar, backing vocals
- Oli Stanton – bass
- Mike Smith – drums

== Singles ==
Information
"Define"
- Released: 27 April 2009

Released as a free single on MySpace.
