= Paul Antrobus =

Canadian Baptist missionary

Professor Paul Antrobus CBM
- Born: Paul McLawrin Antrobus; July 5, 1935; Camrose, Alberta, Canada
- Died: August 12, 2015 (aged 80); Regina, Saskatchewan, Canada
- Education: Brandon University, McMaster University, University of Waterloo
- Occupations: Ecclesiastical administrator and pastor
- Years active: 1962–1969 in India
- Parent(s): Margaret Simmons and Fred Antrobus
- Religion: Christianity
- Church: Canadian Baptist Ministries
- Writings: 1973, Internality, pride and humility
- Offices held: Principal, Baptist Theological Seminary, Kakinada (India), (1966–1968), Professor, Luther College at the University of Regina, Regina (Canada) 1973–2005,
- Title: The Reverend Doctor

Paul McLawrin Antrobus (1935–2015) was a Canadian Baptist missionary who served in India between 1962 and 1969 through the Canadian Baptist Ministries.

Antrobus was much known as a psychology Professor at the Luther College at the University of Regina, Regina (Canada), where he taught from 1973 to 2005.

== Studies ==
Antrobus schooled at the coastal town of Prince Rupert, British Columbia from where he joined the Brandon College, Brandon taking a B.A. degree in 1959. As a graduate student of Brandon College, he participated as an active role in collegiate activities such as the college unit of Student Christian Movement, the Crests and Awards Board and the Zoology Laboratory. After completing graduate studies in arts, Antrobus moved on to the McMaster University, Hamilton, where he pursued a graduate course in theology leading to B.D. in 1962.

For doctoral studies, Antrobus enrolled at the University of Waterloo, Waterloo where he researched in psychology leading to the award of Ph.D. in 1973.

== Career ==
=== Ecclesiastical ===
Antrobus was ordained as a Baptist Pastor in 1962 and left for India as an overseas missionary of the Canadian Baptist Ministries. From 1966 to 1968, he served as the Principal of the Baptist Theological Seminary, Kakinada, succeeding Victor Hahn.

=== Psychology ===
After Antrobus completed doctoral studies in psychology in 1973 from the University of Waterloo, he began teaching psychology at the Luther College at the University of Regina, Regina (Canada), continuing until 2005.

Academic offices
Preceded by Rev. Victor Hahn; 1964–1966	Principal, Baptist Theological Seminary, Kakinada (India); 1966–1968	Succeeded by Rev. T. Gnananandam; 1968–1969
Preceded by	Professor – in – Psychology, Luther College at the University of Regina, Regina (Canada); 1973–2005	Succeeded by

== See also ==
- List of University of Waterloo people
