= Talla Gnananandam =

The Reverend T. Gnananandam, CBCNC Ayyagaru
- Born: Talla Gnananandam
- Other names: Gnanandam Ayyagaru
- Citizenship: India
- Education: B. D., M.A.
- Occupation: Pastor
- Religion: Christianity
- Church: Convention of Baptist Churches of Northern Circars
- Offices held: Principal, Baptist Theological Seminary, Kakinada (1968-1969)
- Title: The Reverend

T. Gnananandam was a Pastor of the Protestant Convention of Baptist Churches of Northern Circars and was Principal of the Baptist Theological Seminary, Kakinada during 1968-1969, the shortest ever in the history of the seminary.

== Studies ==
From 1945-1951, Gnananandam studied Bachelor of Divinity at Serampore College, Serampore during the Principalships of G. H. C. Angus and C. E. Abraham.

== Career ==
Gnananandam became Principal of the seminary in 1968 succeeding Paul Antrobus at a crucial time when efforts were made to close-down the institution as it remained a residual seminary due to the ecumenical initiatives it undertook to form the Andhra Christian Theological College in 1964.

The Indian Church History Review of the Church History Association of India records that the seminary was completely shut down in July 1969 and the students on its rolls were transferred to the Ramayapatnam Baptist Theological Seminary in Ramayapatnam. It was only after a few months that T. Gnananandam finally relocated to Ramayapatnam to join the faculty there.

== Writings ==
Ravela Joseph and B. Suneel Bhanu who had been commissioned by the Board of Theological Education of the Senate of Serampore College to compile the original Christian writings in Telugu have attributed the following titles to the authorship of Gnananandam which feature in the compilation, Bibliography of Original Christian Writings in India in Telugu which include,

- 1962, John E. Davis: The amazing story of the Missionary who became a Leper for Christ
- 1965, Religion of Primitive People with Special Reference to South Indian Dravidian Religion
- No date, Charles T. Stud: A Faith Warrior
- 1972, Our Beginnings

Academic offices
Preceded by Paul Antrobus, CBM; 1966-1968	Principal, Baptist Theological Seminary, Kakinada, Andhra Pradesh; 1968-1969	Succeeded by Gordon D. Barss, CBM; 1975-1977
Other offices
Preceded by The Rev. K. P. Israel; 1956-1958	President, Andhra Baptist Church, Kakinada, Andhra Pradesh; 1959-1960	Succeeded by M. Upmakara Rao; 1961-1962
