= Waldo Penner =

Baptist missionary

The Reverend Doctor Waldo Penner, CBM D. D. (Honoris causa)
- Born: Waldo Penner; 3 October 1919; Secunderabad, India
- Died: 5 May 2006 (aged 86); St. Catharines, Canada
- Education: B.A. (McMaster), B.Div. (McMaster), M.Th. (Berkeley)
- Alma mater: McMaster University, Hamilton, Canada; Berkeley School of Theology, Berkeley, California, United States
- Occupations: Ecclesiastical Administrator and Pastor
- Years active: 1946-1981 in India
- Parent(s): Anna and John Penner
- Religion: Christianity
- Church: Canadian Baptist Ministries
- Ordained: 1945
- Offices held: Principal, Baptist Theological Seminary, Kakinada, (1958–1964)
- Title: The Reverend

Waldo Penner (1919 - 2006) was a Baptist missionary who served in India from 1946 through 1981 as a team member of the Canadian Baptist Ministries. Penner was born in Secunderabad in India where his parents were missionaries of the American Baptist Mission.

== Studies ==
For collegiate studies, Penner studied at the McMaster University, Hamilton for the graduate degrees of B.A. and B.D. Penner also studied for a postgraduate course leading to M.Th. at the Berkeley Baptist Divinity School (renamed as the American Baptist Seminary of the West), Berkeley.

== Ecclesiastical ministry ==
After Penner's ordination in 1945, he volunteered for missionary service in India and stayed on in the country for more than 35 years.

=== Ecumenical initiatives ===
In 1958 when A. B. Masilamani stepped down as Principal of the Baptist Theological Seminary, Kakinada, the Seminary Council appointed Waldo Penner to take on the Principalship of the Seminary. It was during this period that ecumenical conversations were building up for the formation of a unified Seminary in the state of Andhra Pradesh (Telangana included). Penner, together with his companion, A. B. Masilamani were in the forefront of the ecumenical conversations leading to the formation of the Andhra Christian Theological College, Rajahmundry in 1964 together with the Anglicans, Congregationalists, Lutherans, the Methodists and the Wesleyans.

On the formation of the ecumenical seminary in 1964 in Rajahmundry, Penner relocated from Kakinada to Rajahmundry and joined the faculty of the newly formed ecumenical seminary and taught Systematic theology till 1971-1972 when the college shifted in its entirety to Hyderabad in Telangana. Meanwhile, the Seminary Council appointed Victor Hahn in place of Waldo Penner at the Baptist Theological Seminary, Kakinada. As for his companion, A. B. Masilamani, he had already moved to the Bible Society of India Andhra Pradesh Auxiliary, and like Penner was ministering in an ecumenical setting.

=== Development initiatives ===
When the 1977 Andhra Pradesh cyclone struck the coast of Krishna district along the Bay of Bengal, thousands of lives were lost. As part of the relief and rebuilding efforts, the Canadian Baptist Ministries also lent its hand and its work was supervised by Waldo Penner.

== Honours ==
In 1982, the McMaster University, Hamilton conferred upon Penner the degree of Doctor of Divinity by honoris causa.

Academic offices
Preceded by A. B. Masilamani, CBCNC; 1955-1958	Principal, Baptist Theological Seminary, Kakinada; 1958-1964	Succeeded by Victor Hahn, CBM; 1964-1966
Academic offices
Preceded by Position created	Teacher - in - Systematic Theology, Andhra Christian Theological College, Rajahmundry/Secunderabad; 1964-1972	Succeeded by Ryder Devapriam, CSI, R. Yesurathnam, CSI
