= Archibald Gordon (missionary) =

Canadian Baptist missionary (1882–1967)

The Reverend Archibald Gordon
- Born: Archibald Gordon; 1882; Aberdeen, Scotland
- Died: 1967 (aged 84–85); Canada
- Education: Brandon University, Toronto University
- Occupations: Ecclesiastical administrator and pastor
- Years active: 1913-1953 in India

Ecclesiastical career
- Religion: Christianity
- Church: Canadian Baptist Ministries
- Writings: 1969, The opal sky of India: An autobiography
- Congregations: First Baptist Church Calgary (Canada)
- Offices held: Principal, Baptist Theological Seminary, Kakinada (India), (1945-1952)
- Title: The Reverend

Archibald Gordon (born 1882; died 1967) was a Canadian Baptist missionary who served in India during 1913-1953 with Canadian Baptist Ministries.

== Early life and studies ==
Archibald Gordon was born in Aberdeen, Scotland, in 1882 and went to Canada in 1907. He enrolled for graduate studies at the Brandon University, Brandon where he took a B.A. and a B.Th. in 1913. He later upgraded his academics by studying for a B.D. degree at the University of Toronto in 1947.

== Ecclesiastical career ==
Gordon served as a Baptist missionary in India in Andhra Pradesh from 1913 to 1953. During the last decade of his presence in India, he became principal of the Baptist Theological Seminary, Kakinada during the period 1945-1952 following which the seminary council of the Baptist Theological Seminary appointed Chetti Bhanumurthy as the first Indian principal of the seminary.

== Honours ==
In 1956, the McMaster University honoured Gordon with a Doctor of Divinity (honoris causa).

Academic offices
Preceded by Gordon P. Barss; 1939-1945	Principal, Baptist Theological Seminary, Kakinada (India); 1945-1952	Succeeded by Chetty Bhanumurthy; 1952-1955
