= Ecumenical Institute for Distance Theological Studies =

Coordinates: 43.612°S 172.629°E

The Ecumenical Institute for Distance Theological Studies (EIDTS) was a Christian theological college located in New Zealand.

== History and Closure ==
The Ecumenical Institute for Distance Theological Studies was established in 1993.

It was to replace the former Joint Board of Theological Studies, which comprised five churches from 1968 to 1992, which in its turn had replaced the St John's Theological College (for the Anglican and Methodist churches.)

In December 2012, government funding has ceased, as a result, it forced the institution to close on December in 2014. Although the final EIDTS graduation was held in April 2015.
