= Star of Hope (newspaper) =

Historic prison newspaper

May 4, 1901 issue of Star of Hope

The Star of Hope was a newspaper entirely written published and printed fortnightly by and for inmates of five prisons in New York State, covering topics of world news, health, sports, editorials, fiction and poetry among others. Incepted at Sing Sing penitentiary in 1899, it rapidly spread to Auburn Correctional Facility, Auburn Women's, and Clinton prisons as well as the then new Reformatory at Napanoch as a result of its success. Both writers and editors were anonymized in the publication due to being known only by their prison numbers. The circulation of the paper was kept within the prison with only enough papers for each prison being printed. While the Star of Hope was not available to the public, The Cincinnati Enquirer published an interview conducted by the Auburn local editor, No. 25,818, of a prisoner referred to as "The Hard Man" and his opinions on marriage in October 1900.
