= Serango =

- Village
- Location within Odisha Location within India
- Coordinates: 19°00′25.8″N 84°02′43.1″E
- Country: India
- State: Odisha
- District: Gajapati District
- Elevation: 61 m (200 ft)

Population (2022)
  - Total: 2,710
- Demonym: Saura

Language
  - Official: Odia; Saura

Employment
  - Rate: 50%
- Time zone: UTC+5:30 (IST)
- PIN: 761207
- Telephone code: 06817

Serango is a village in Gumma tahasil, Gajapati district, Odisha state, India. It is located 36 kilometres (22 mi) North of its district headquarters at Paralakhemundi, 8 kilometres (5.0 mi) from Gumma, and 305 kilometres (190 mi) from the state capital Bhubaneswar. It is close to Mahendragiri, one of the highest mountain peaks in the state.

== Brief history ==
Serango is where Canadian Baptist Missionaries began their work in the region during the early 20th century. Their monument, Bethany Bungalow, is still there today. They also established a mission hospital, that is, the Serango Christian Hospital, that continues to serve the need for those in medical need and it was their first such enterprise. One branch is operating near Paralakhemundi, that is, the CBM Eye Services, Ranipeta. They also started an orphanage here.

It is also the centre for the development of Soura literature because the missionaries had the Bible translated into that languages as a means of propagating their beliefs.

== Education ==
Serango has two primary schools, being Serango Government High School and Jisu Prem English School.

There are no other educational facilities but nearby colleges include:

- Centurion School Of Rural Enterprise Management
- S.k.C.G College
- Jagannath Institute For Technology And Management
- Meena Ketan Degree College
