= Telegraphs (band) =

Alternative rock band in Brighton, England

- Origin: Brighton, UK
- Genres: Alternative rock Indie rock
- Years active: 2005 - 2010
- Labels: Small Town Records
- Members: Darcy Harrison; Hattie Williams; Sam Bacon; Darren LeWarne; Aung Yay
- Website: Official Website; Myspace

Telegraphs were an alternative rock band based in Brighton, England.

== Biography ==
Formed in 2005, Telegraphs was made up of members Darcy Harrison (vocals), Hattie Williams (bass/vocals), Sam Bacon (drums), Darren LeWarne (guitar) and Aung Yay (also known as Gary Yay) (guitar/backing vocals). They played alternative rock, emotionally charged lyrically and accompanied by cutting angular guitars, riff-based melodies and pounding, driven drum-rhythms, influenced by such bands as Biffy Clyro, Reuben, Oceansize and Idlewild. The band split on 17 September 2010.

== Album recording ==
In 2008 the band completed the recording of their album We Were Ghosts, recorded under Dave Eringa (Idlewild, Manic Street Preachers, These Animal Men). The album was released in May 2009 on Small Town Records to favourable reviews, receiving 4 Ks out of five in Kerrang! magazine and 8/10 in NME. It was preceded by the single "I Don't Navigate By You" released on 2 March under the same label. The Line of Best Fit remarked about the album, stating "The second rate atypical choruses you hear from so many bands at present are instead what adorn We Were Ghosts."

Track list

1. "The Argument"
2. "We Dance in Slow Motion"
3. "Your First Love Is Dead"
4. "Forever Never"
5. "Drop D Not Bombs"
6. "I Don't Navigate By You"
7. "The Rules of Modern Policing"
8. "So Cold"
9. "Notes From An Exit Station"
10. "Eyes Stitched Open"
11. "What's So Good About Goodbye?"

== Discography ==
=== Singles ===
| Name | Label | Release date |
|---|---|---|
| Across A Wire EP | Nighthawks | 25 June 2007 |
| "This Is The Message" | Nighthawks | 26 November 2007 |
| "The Rules of Modern Policing" | Nighthawks | 14 April 2008 |
| "Your First Love Is Dead" | Nighthawks | December 2008 |
| "I Don't Navigate By You" | Small Town Records | 2 March 2009 |

=== Albums ===
| Name | Label | Release date |
|---|---|---|
| We Were Ghosts | Small Town Records | May 2009 |
