= Gordon Payzant Barss =

Canadian Baptist missionary

The Reverend Gordon Payzant Barss CBM
- Born: Gordon Payzant Barss; February 10, 1885; Dartmouth, Nova Scotia, Canada
- Died: 1969 (aged 83–84); Canada
- Education: B.A. (1906), B.D. (1910)
- Alma mater: Acadia University, Wolfville (Canada), Colgate Rochester Crozer Divinity School, Rochester (U.S.)
- Occupation(s): Ecclesiastical administrator and pastor
- Years active: 1910-1945 in India
- Religion: Christianity
- Church: Canadian Baptist Ministries
- Writings: 1910, The teacher come from God. The teachings of Jesus according to the Gospels; 1946, African Churches in Nova Scotia,
- Offices held: Principal, Baptist Theological Seminary, Kakinada (India), (1939-1945)
- Title: The Reverend

Gordon Payzant Barss (1885–1969) was a Canadian Baptist missionary who served in India from 1910 to 1945 through the Canadian Baptist Ministries.

== Early life and studies ==
Payzant Barss was born in Dartmouth, Nova Scotia, and pursued a postgraduate course at the Acadia University during 1903–1904. Barss later pursued theological studies leading to Bachelor of Divinity at the Colgate Rochester Crozer Divinity School, Rochester (United States of America) in 1910, the same year he married Lena Helene Feistel (1883–1973).

== Ecclesiastical career ==
Barss came to India in 1910 as a missionary of the Canadian Baptist Ministries and served in Tekkali and other northern coastal regions along the Bay of Bengal in Andhra Pradesh till 1945. Barss became Principal of the Baptist Theological Seminary, Kakinada in 1939 taking over from J. B. McLaurin and led the Seminary for six consecutive academic years until 1945 following which the Seminary Council of the Baptist Theological Seminary appointed Archibald Gordon to succeed him. Barss died in 1969 and is interred in Wolfville, Nova Scotia.

== Honours ==
In 1935, the Acadia University, conferred a Doctor of Divinity by Honoris Causa upon Gordon P. Barss.

Academic offices
Preceded by Rev. J. B. McLaurin, CBM, 1926-1939	Principal, Baptist Theological Seminary, Kakinada (India); 1939-1945	Succeeded by Rev. Archibald Gordon, CBM; 1945-1952
