= Talluru Thomas Gabriel =

Founder of CBCNC Talluru Thomas Gabriel Pastor
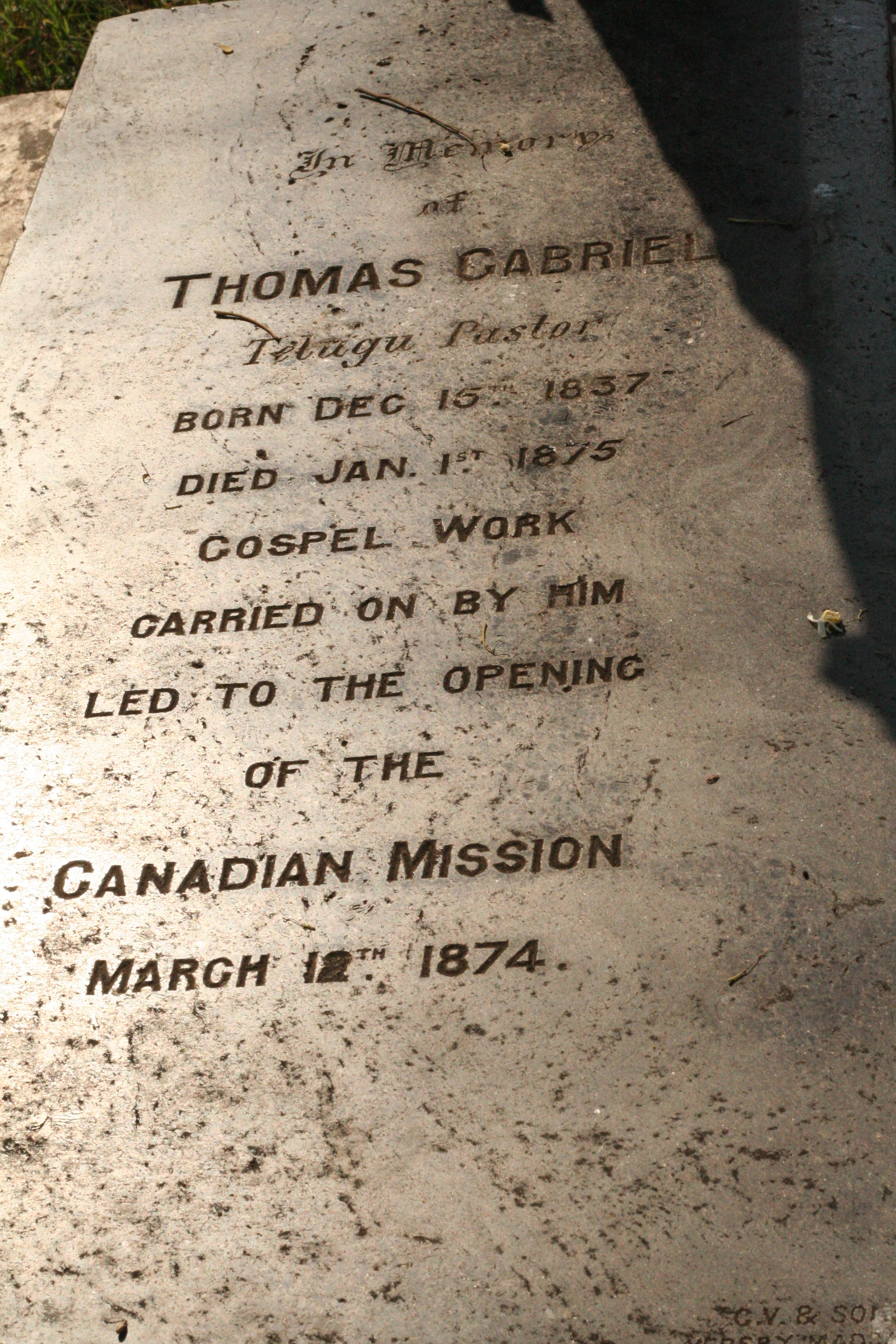
- Born: Talluru Marayya; 15 December 1837; Masulipatnam, Colonial India
- Died: 1 January 1875 (aged 37)
- Burial place: Jagannaickpur CBM-Cemetery, Kakinada
- Known for: Inspiring missions
- Church: Canadian Baptist Mission/Convention of Baptist Churches of Northern Circars
- Ordained: 1870-1871 in Chennai
- Title: Pastor

Talluru Thomas Gabriel (born December 15, 1837; died January 1, 1875) was the founder of the Canadian Baptist Mission in India.

== Early life and education ==
Thomas Gabriel was born in Machilipatnam and grew up at Narasapur and Rajahmundry where he studied at the Lutheran School. After securing employment with the Telegraphs Department in 1857, he worked at Rajahmundry and at Kakinada. Gabriel was influenced by the Lutheran missionaries of Rajahmundry and became a Christian through the Andhra Evangelical Lutheran Church.

In addition to Thomas Gabriel's employment, he was active in his new-found Christian faith. Gabriel was later transferred to Mumbai but his sickness made him to go to Chennai in 1867 and in the Hospital, he came across Pastors of the American Baptist Mission/Samavesam of Telugu Baptist Churches and got baptized.

== Ministry ==
Gabriel gave up his job at the Telegraphs Department in 1869 to take up an ecclesiastical assignment with the Godavari Delta Mission but it was short-lived as he quit it in 1870 and got into business in Kakinada to support himself after having exhausted all his money for the sake of the gospel.

A chance stopover in Ramayapatnam at the Ramayapatnam Baptist Theoogical Seminary made Gabriel to appeal to the Canadian Baptists of Ontario and Quebec through John McLaurin to take up the Mission in northern coastal regions and thus led to the founding of the Canadian Baptist Mission in 1874 at Kakinada with the arrival of John McLaurin who came from Ramayapatnam to Kakinada by sea.

Gabriel died on 1 January 1875 uttering his last words, Jesus is precious.
