= Licentiate in Theology =

Non-degree qualification

The Licentiate in Theology or Licence in Theology (LTh or ThL) is a non-degree qualification in theology awarded by some Anglican institutions in Canada and previously awarded by Anglican and Presbyterian institutions in other Commonwealth countries. The qualification was introduced in the first half of the 19th century for candidates to the Anglican priesthood in the United Kingdom and has primarily been offered by Anglican theological colleges and universities.

== History ==
=== United Kingdom ===
The Licence in Theology was initially offered in the United Kingdom, where it was one of two courses (the other being the Bachelor of Arts degree course) offered by Durham University at its opening in 1833 and was first awarded in 1834. The name referred to the qualification being a licence from the university for a candidate for ordination in the Church of England to present himself to a bishop; this caused some confusion with licentiate degrees in France and other European countries. It required both the passing of an academic examination and a testimonial to the candidate's moral character. The course initially had a standard length of two years, reduced to one for graduates of Oxford and Cambridge (and, soon after, for Durham graduates); this was raised to three years for 1841–1846, but this led to a serious fall in numbers and it returned to two years from 1846. It ran in a variety of different forms, including being offered with honours for a period from 1864 to 1907 (when the honours course in theology leading to a BA was established). From the 1870s the LTh was opened to students at Anglican theological colleges in the UK associated with Durham without the need for residence at the university (after passing the LTh they could take a BA following a year in residence at Durham and the passing of the required exams). The LTh (as well as other degrees) was also offered at two affiliated colleges of the university in Barbados and Sierra Leone from the 1870s, and the LTh was extended from 1910 to other associated Anglican theological colleges outside of the UK. From 1918, the LTh was only available to students at these affiliated colleges (including institutions in Australia, Barbados, Canada, Jamaica, New Zealand, Nigeria and Sierra Leone as well as in the UK) and was not offered at Durham. It was abolished in 1949. The Common Awards validated by Durham and offered to all Church of England ordinands since 2014, as well as trainee ministers from the Methodist, Baptist and United Reformed churches, include a variety of degree and non-degree qualifications. However, these follow the naming conventions of the Framework for Higher Education Qualifications and do not include a licence in theology.

St David's College, Lampeter awarded a Licence in Divinity (LD) from 1884 to c. 1940. The LTh, introduced in 1971, was intended for graduate ordinands, and was equivalent to the final year of a bachelor's degree. As of 2024, the course was still offered by the University of Wales, Trinity Saint David, the successor institution of St David's College, but now called the Graduate Diploma in Bible and Theology in keeping with the Framework for Higher Education Qualifications.

St John's College, Nottingham, previously the London College of Divinity, replaced its Associate of the London College of Divinity diploma with a License in Theology diploma when it relocated to Nottingham in 1971. The college closed in 2019.

The University of Aberdeen offered a Licence in Theology until 2002, when it was withdrawn due to the Church of Scotland deciding to no longer recognise the degree.

=== Australia ===
The Australian College of Theology offered a Licentiate in Theology from its opening in 1891, originally as a qualification only for ordained clergy. Until the 1970s, most Australian theological colleges were not associated with universities and thus offered non-degree programmes such as the Licentiate in Theology.

The Durham Licence in Theology was offered by Moore Theological College from 1910 and St John's College, Morpeth from 1912 as associated theological colleges.

Tyndale College, which opened in 1995, offered a Licentiate in Theology until 2017, when the college closed. The award required the satisfactory completion of sixteen units (i.e., the equivalent of two years' of undergraduate study) and allowed entry to the college's award of Scholar in Theology.

=== Barbados ===
In Barbados, the Durham Licence in Theology was offered by Codrington College as an affiliated college from 1875.

=== Canada ===
In Canada, the Licentiate in Theology was introduced by Trinity College, Toronto in 1884. This was a "college degree" qualification for those preparing for ordination, sitting below the "university degree" of Bachelor of Arts.

The Durham Licence in Theology was offered by Queen's College, Newfoundland as an associated theological college from 1912.

=== Ghana ===
Bishop Jacob Kofi Ayeebo earned a Licence in Theology at St Nicholas Theological Seminary, Cape Coast, Ghana (founded 1975).

=== India ===
The Serampore College introduced a Licentiate in Theology in 1916 as an undergraduate programme. This ran until 1969, when it was upgraded to a Bachelor in Theology programme.

=== Jamaica ===
In Jamaica, the Durham Licence in Theology was offered by St Peter's College (since merged into the United Theological College of the West Indies) as an associated theological college from 1910.

=== New Zealand ===
In New Zealand, the Durham Licence in Theology was offered by Selwyn College, Otago as an associated theological college from 1910.

The diploma of Licentiate in Theology was offered by St John's College, Auckland from 1951. The course was transferred to the Ecumenical Institute for Distance Theological Studies when it opened in 1993, where it was offered until the institute closed in 2015.

=== Nigeria ===
In Nigeria, the Durham Licence in Theology was offered by St Andrew's College, Oyo (now Ajayi Crowther University) as an associated theological college from 1912.

=== Sierra Leone ===
In Sierra Leone, the Durham Licence in Theology was offered by Fourah Bay College as an affiliated college from 1876.

=== South Africa ===
Archbishop Desmond Tutu took a Licence in Theology at St Peter’s College, Johannesburg, in 1960, prior to his ordination as a deacon.

== Current ==
In Canada, Licentiates in Theology are, as of 2024, offered by Huron University College, the College of Emmanuel and St. Chad, Trinity College, Toronto, and the Montreal Diocesan Theological College.

== See also ==
- Academic degree
