= Christian Medical Association of India =

The Christian Medical Association of India (CMAI) is a forum, a gathering place, an association and an instrument for social reform. It is a fellowship of doctors, nurses, administrators, chaplains and allied health professionals who assist India’s poorest and most deprived sections of society. CMAI believes that the Biblical faith calls and commands it to proclaim the Gospel and to heal the sick, the suffering and the downtrodden.

== Background ==
The history of CMAI dates back to 1905 when a group of missionaries serving in India, set up the Medical Missionary Association (MMA), a forum for supporting each other professionally and spiritually. In 1926, it was renamed as the Christian Medical Association of India. CMAI has done pioneering work in areas including leprosy, tuberculosis, malaria and HIV/AIDS.

== Objectives ==
- Prevention and relief of human suffering irrespective of caste, creed, community, religion and economic status.
- Promotion of knowledge of the factors governing health.
- Coordination of activities for training doctors, nurses, allied health professionals and others involved in the ministry of healing.
- Implementation of schemes for comprehensive health care, family planning and community welfare.
- Rendering health in calamities and disasters of all kinds.

== See also ==
- Catholic Health Association of India
- Christian Medical College
- Council of Christian Hospitals
