= Pithapuram =

Pithapuram Peetikapuram
- city
- Pithapuram
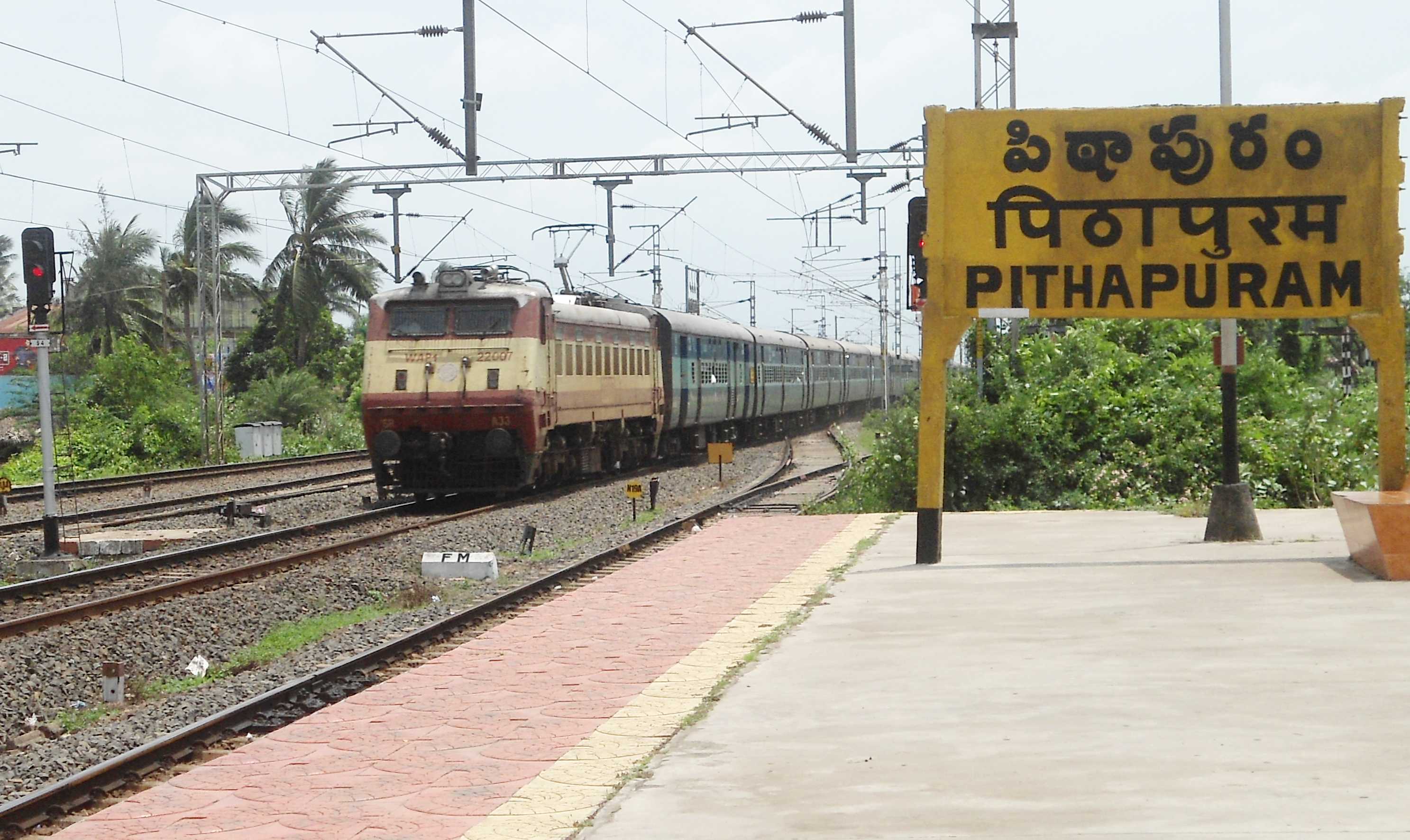
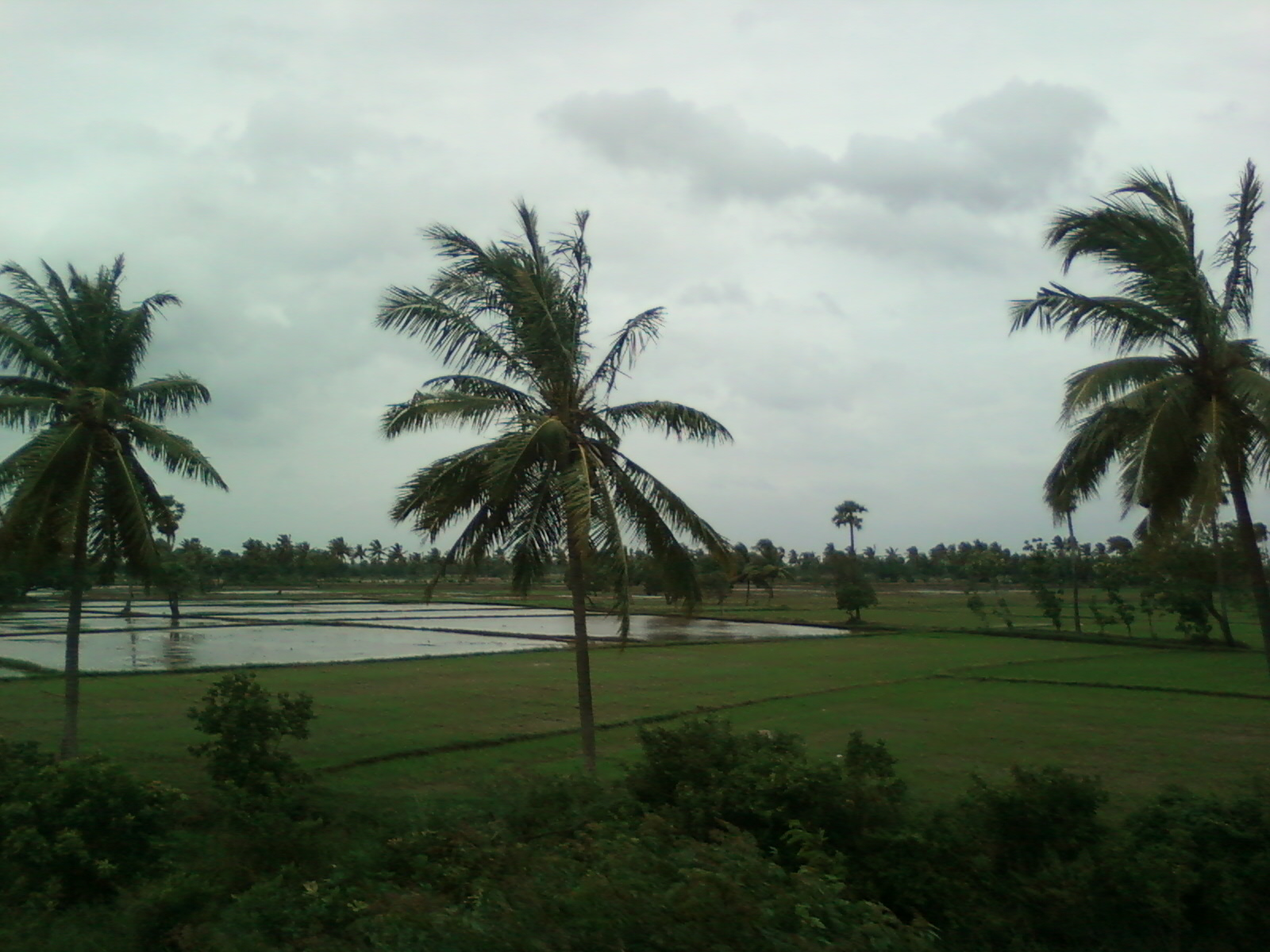
- Top: Pithapuram Railway Station; Bottom: Paddy fields near Pithapuram

- Location in Andhra Pradesh, India
- Coordinates: 17.1167°N 82.2667°E
- Country: India
- State: Andhra Pradesh
- District: Kakinada district

Government
  - Type: PADA
  - Body: Pithapuram Municipal Council

Area
  - Total: 112.6 km^{2} (43.5 sq mi)
  - Rank: 10
- Elevation: 10 m (33 ft)

Population (2011)
  - Total: 154,859
  - Rank: 10
  - Density: 1,375/km^{2} (3,562/sq mi)

Languages
  - Official: Telugu
- Time zone: UTC+5:30 (IST)
- Postal code: 533450
- Vehicle Registration: AP05 (Former); AP39 (from 30 January 2019)

Pithapuram (also spelled as Pitapuram) is a city and municipality in the Kakinada district of Andhra Pradesh, India. With a history spanning over 1,500 years, it is one of the oldest towns in the state. Pithapuram served as the capital for various kingdoms of Andhra, dating back to the 4th century CE, and continues to be an important pilgrimage destination.

The city is renowned for the Kukkuteswara Temple complex, which also houses the Puruhutika Devi Temple, one of the eighteen Maha Shakti Pithas, considered among the most significant pilgrimage destinations in Shaktism. Pitapuram is also the birthplace of Sripada Sri Vallabha, a prominent 14th-century Hindu saint. The town holds significant historical and religious significance, being mentioned in ancient texts such as the Skanda Purana and Srinatha's Bheemeswara Puranam (c. 15th century).

Historically, Pitapuram has roots dating back to ancient times as a sovereign Town. It is referenced in Samudragupta's Prayaga inscription (c. 350 CE) under the name Pishtapura, during the reign of King Mahendra. In the 7th century CE, it served as the initial capital of the Eastern Chalukyas before they moved their capital to Vengi. Over time, Pitapuram later became one of the administrative divisions, or Rāṣṭras, of the Eastern Chalukyas. During the late 12th century, Pruthviswara (r. 1186–1207) of the Velanati Chodas ruled from Pitapuram. In the 12th and 13th centuries, the Pitapuram Chalukyas, a collateral branch of the Chalukyas, controlled the surrounding region, including Rajamahendravaram, Pitapuram, and Draksharamam. By the 18th century, Pitapuram became the centre of the Pitapuram Estate, which covered an area of 393 square miles (1,020 km^{2}) by 1903.

== History ==
Pitapuram, originally known as Pishtapura, is first mentioned around 350 CE in the Prayaga Pillar inscription of the Gupta emperor Samudragupta, which records his victory over King Mahendra of Pishtapura. Inscriptions from the 4th and 5th centuries by the Vasishtha and Mathara dynasties refer to Pishtapura as part of the Kalinga region.

In the 7th century, Chalukya king Pulakeshin II annexed Pishtapura into his kingdom. The Town initially served as the capital of the Eastern Chalukyas before they shifted their capital to Vengi. Subsequently, Pitapuram became one of the administrative divisions, or Rastras, under the Chalukyas.

During the late 12th century, Pruthviswara (r. 1186–1207), of the Velanati Chodas ruled from Pitapuram. The Town was later governed by the Pitapuram Chalukyas, a cadet branch of the Chalukyas, who controlled the area around Rajamahendravaram, Pitapuram, and Draksharamam during the 12th and 13th centuries. Inscriptions from 1186 to 1391 CE also highlight its significance under the rule of the Konas and the Reddi kings.

The Pitapuram Zamindar Pithapuram Estate family arrived in the Godavari District in 1571 and was granted the jagir of Anaparthi. They served as Sardars of Rajamahendravaram, commanding 4,000 troops, and received the Zamindari sanad in 1749 from Rustum Khan, a general of the Nizam of Hyderabad. In 1802, they established a permanent settlement with the British. By 1903, their estate covered 393 square miles (1,020 km^{2}) and generated a revenue of ₹9,14,000, with a peskash of ₹2,44,000.

The Pitapuram Rajas were notable patrons of education and healthcare. They sponsored the classical Telugu dictionary Sri Suryarayandhra Nighantuvu and commissioned the first Telugu typewriter. They founded the Pithapur Raja's Government College (PR Government College) in Kakinada and supported the establishment of the Christian Medical Centre (CMC) by the Canadian Baptist Mission, which has been renowned for its medical services since the eighteenth century.

== Geography ==
Pitapuram is located at 17.1167°N 82.2667°E. It has an average elevation of 10 meters (33 feet). The town is approximately 20 kilometres from the district headquarters, Kakinada, and 75 kilometres from Rajahmundry. In 1957, Pitapuram was designated as a 2nd grade Municipality and an urban local body (ULB). It is spread over an area of 19.57 square kilometres.

Pitapuram is landlocked but is located near several beaches, although none are within the town itself. Most of its economic activity is centered in Kakinada. Notable neighborhoods in Pitapuram include C.B.M. Christian Medical Centre, Jaggayya Cheruvu, Drivers Colony, Pada Gaya Junction, Agraharam, and Satellite Town.

=== Climate ===
Pitapuram experiences a tropical climate, with winters extending from November to February and summers from March to June. The town receives an annual rainfall of 178 mm, predominantly during the monsoon season from July to September.

== Religious sites ==
Pitapuram, an important pilgrimage destination, is renowned for its religious significance and historical temples. The town hosts the Kukkuteswara Temple complex, which houses several significant shrines, including the Puruhutika Devi Temple—one of the eighteen Maha Shakti Peethas. This temple is venerated in Shaktism as a major pilgrimage site, marking it as the 10th Shakti Peetha. The Kukkuteswara Temple, dedicated to Lord Siva in the form of a self-originating (Swayambhu) Lingam, and the Puruhutika Devi Temple are central to the town's religious landscape.

Additionally, Pitapuram is known for its other notable temples, such as the Kunthimadhava Swamy Temple and the Sri Pada Vallabha Anagha Datha Kshethram. The town is also famous for the Pada Gaya Sarovar, a sacred pond believed to grant salvation to those who bathe in it, and for performing "Pinda Pradanam" (last rites), which is considered as auspicious as performing them in Varanasi. The town is closely associated with Sripada Sri Vallabha, an important 14th-century Hindu saint, believed by his followers to be an incarnation of Dattatreya, further adding to its religious prominence.

== Demographics ==
As per the 2011 Indian Census, the Town had a population of 54,859. The average literacy rate stands at 75.00% with 35,434 literates, higher than the national average of 73.00%.

== Transport ==
Pithapuram Town is situated on NH 216. Pithapuram railway station is located on Duvvada-Vijayawada section of Howrah-Chennai main line. Rajahmundry Airport is located 55 km (34 mi) from Pithapuram.

== Members of Legislative Assembly ==
Year	Candidate	Party
2024–Present	Konidela Pawan Kalyan	Janasena Party

== Notable residents ==
- Devulapalli Krishnasastry (1897–1980), Telugu poet and playwright, brought up in Pitapuram
- Dronamraju Krishna Rao (1937–2020), geneticist, born in Pitapuram
- Pithapuram Nageswara Rao(1930-1996), playback singer, born in Pitapuram.
