= Canadian Baptist Mission =

The Canadian Baptist Mission (CBM) is an international Baptist Christian missionary society. It is a constituent board affiliated with the Canadian Baptist Ministries.

== History ==
It was established in 1850 by the Canadian Baptist Ministries. The CBM was founded at the initiative of Thomas Gabriel which gave the impetus to the Canadian Baptists to embark on overseas missions.

In India, the Canadian Baptist Mission work was spread in Andhra Pradesh and Odisha. In the postcolonial era, four societies were formed to take over the work of the CBM in India based on linguistic basis.
