= Convention of Baptist Churches of Northern Circars =

Christian denomination in Andhra Pradesh, India

- Abbreviation: CBCNC
- Classification: Evangelicalism
- Scripture: Holy Bible
- Theology: Baptist
- Polity: Congregational
- Governance: Association
- Associations: National Council of Churches in India, Baptist World Alliance, National Council of Churches in India
- Region: Andhra Pradesh
- Headquarters: Kakinada
- Founder: Thomas Gabriel and the Canadian Baptists of Ontario and Quebec
- Origin: 1874; Kakinada
- Congregations: 310
- Members: 240,000
- Official website: www.cbcnc.in

The Convention of Baptist Churches of Northern Circars (CBCNC) is a Baptist Christian denomination in north coastal Andhra Pradesh. The churches are part of the Telugu Christian community of Southern India. Its language is Telugu. It is affiliated to the Baptist World Alliance (BWA), the National Council of Churches in India (NCCI) and the World Council of Churches (WCC).

== History ==
CBCNC was founded in 1874 by the Canadian Baptist Mission founded by Thomas Gabriel along with the Canadian Baptists of Ontario and Quebec.

From 1947 to 1972, the Convention of Baptist Churches of Northern Circars was managed effortlessly in spite of difficulties. During 1972, crisis brew in the Convention leading to irreparable damage. M. B. Diwakar researched on the crisis with the title, An Investigation into the historical antecedents of the crisis in the CBCNC during 1972 to 1974. Due to the crisis, the Churches established by the Canadian Baptist Mission continued to move forward due to the congregational type of structure. However, the central leadership is not in place as there are many fractions of the Convention, each claiming to be the rightful successor and the matter continues to be subjudice.

According to a census published by the association in 2023, it claimed 310 churches and 240,000 members.

== Schools ==
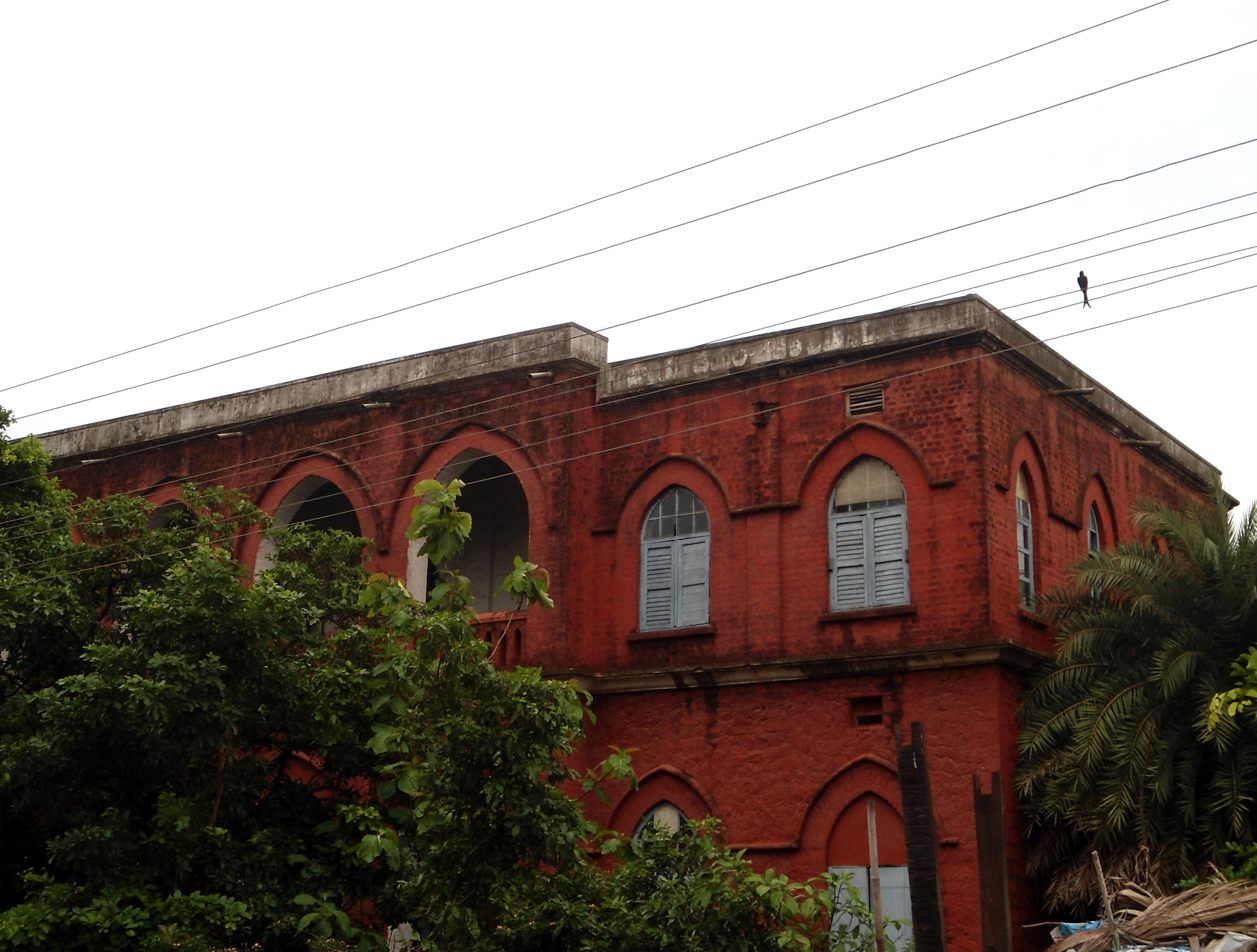
Baptist Theological Seminary in Kakinada.

- Ministerial
  - Andhra Christian Theological College, Secunderabad, Telangana (through Seminary Council),
  - Baptist Theological Seminary, Kakinada, Andhra Pradesh,
- Ministerial and technical
  - Eva Rose York Bible Training and Technical School for Women, Tuni, Andhra Pradesh

== See also ==
- Samavesam of Telugu Baptist Churches
