= G. D. Melanchthon =

Indian theologian

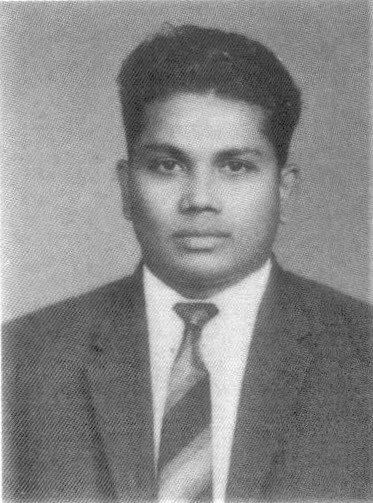
- Melanchthon in the 1960s
- Born: Godi Daniel Melanchthon; 20 November 1934; Ramachandrapuram, East Godavari (Andhra Pradesh)
- Died: 22 September 1994 (aged 59); Bangalore (Karnataka)
- Other name: Melanchthon ayyagaru
- Education: B. A. (Andhra), M. A. (Andhra), B. D. (Serampore), M. Th. (Serampore), Research exposure (LSTC and Birmingham)
- Alma mater: Andhra Christian College, Guntur (Andhra Pradesh), Andhra University, Waltair (Andhra Pradesh), Gurukul Lutheran Theological College, Madras (Tamil Nadu), Lutheran School of Theology at Chicago (United States), Selly Oak Colleges, Birmingham (United Kingdom)
- Occupation: Pastor
- Years active: 1961 to 1994 (33 years)
- Known for: Insights on Hinduism
- Spouse: Katie Vyduryam-Melanchthon
- Children: Monica Jyotsna Melanchthon, Esther Suhasini-Williams, Mary Louise Shanti-Devadas, Rebecca Naveena-Roberts
- Parent(s): Smt. Mary (Mother), Sri Godi Jesudas (Father)
- Religion: Christianity
- Church: Andhra Evangelical Lutheran Church Society
- Ordained: 1961, K. Krupadanam, AELC
- Writings: 1967, A study of the idea and meaning of God with special reference to the 11th chapter of Bhagavad Gita in the context of Renascent Hinduism, 1968, Visvarupasandarsanam and its relevance for today, 1980, Hindu Impact on the Christian Attitude to Scripture; 1986, Mission and Evangelism in a Pluralistic Context
- Congregations served: Kothapeta, East Godavari district (Andhra Pradesh) (1961-1963), Bangalore, Bangalore Urban district (Karnataka) (1968-1988)
- Title: The Reverend

G. D. Melanchthon (20 November 1934 – 22 September 1994) was a Andhra Evangelical Lutheran Church Society priest who taught religion, at United Theological College, Bangalore from 1968 until the latter half of the 1980s, with his career being brought to an abrupt end in 1988 when he was stricken with paralysis. Melanchthon used to be quite active among the academic community along with Chrysostom Arangaden, Arvind P. Nirmal and others in not only delivering scholarly talks, but also in contributing research articles and reviewing new titles.

Melanchthon was born in Ramachandrapuram, East Godavari (Andhra Pradesh) into a Christian family and was raised in accordance with Lutheran traditions. The history of Christianity in Ramachandrapuram is attributed to the French Jesuits and the Canadian Baptists, dating to the latter half of the nineteenth century. In 1892 the Canadian Baptist Ministries began their ministry through an integral mission comprising spiritual, educational and healing components with a church (1892), an all-girls Raja Cockshutt School (1898), and J. D. Kellock Home for Lepers (1903). Not only did the emerging Christian missions through Canadian Baptist Ministries mould Melanchthon's growth in Christianity, but as an adolescent, he also came under the influence of the popular evangelist, A. B. Masilamani, CBCNC, who was ministering as a priest between 1944 and 1947 in Ramachandrapuram. Masilamani's ability to make use of Homiletics made a definitive impact on the faith journey of early Telugu Christians, a fact recollected by the Old Testament scholar, G. Babu Rao, CBCNC.

== Studies ==
After completing schooling from Ramachandrapuram, Melanchthon proceeded to AELC-Andhra Christian College, Guntur, for pre-university and undergraduate studies leading to B.A. This was during the tenure of Rao Saheb T. S. Paulus, as principal. Continuing his academics, Melanchthon proceeded to Waltair and enrolled for a postgraduate programme leading to M.A. at Andhra University. Incidentally, the geologist, Bunyan Edmund Vijayam, was also studying at the university during the same time, and the two were contemporaries. The university was headed by Vice-chancellor V. S. Krishna during that period. Initially, after his postgraduate studies, Melanchthon worked in the Andhra Pradesh Government serving in a Mandal Office. Around this time, he found his calling towards full-time priesthood. Much like Saint Ambrose of Milan, the Early Church Father, Melanchthon resigned from government service and proceeded to the office of the president of the Andhra Evangelical Lutheran Church Society headquartered in Guntur, which was headed by G. Devasahayam, AELC and conveyed his interest in the vocation of priesthood.

=== Basic spiritual studies ===
By 1958, Melanchthon enrolled at Gurukul Lutheran Theological College, Chennai, an affiliated seminary of the Senate of Serampore College, India's first University founded by the Baptist Missions led by Joshua Marshman, William Carey, and William Ward. He pursued a graduate programme in B. D. studying under notable faculty consisting of Sigfrid Estborn, who was teaching History of Christianity and Ecumenism, P. David teaching religions, R. A. Martin who was teaching biblical studies and Jacob Kumaresan teaching systematic theology. His companions were Kambar Manickam, TELC, K. James Carl, SALC, G. Emmanuel, AELC and also M. Victor Paul, AELC, de:Johnson Gnanabaranam, TELC, T. B. D. Prakasa Rao, CSI, among others, who were studying at the seminary at varying periods of study. By the end of the three-year course in 1961, Melanchthon performed well in his examinations and secured two university-level prizes, viz., George Howells Prize in History of Religions and Senators' Prize in Biblical Studies and was awarded a Bachelor of Divinity degree by the Senate of Serampore College (University) in the ensuing convocation of 1962 led by its registrar, C. Devasahayam, CBCNC.

=== Advanced spiritual studies ===
After a couple of years of parish ministry between 1961 and 1965, Melanchthon returned to his Alma mater to pursue a postgraduate course leading to M. Th., specializing in religions, between 1965 and 1967, where he worked out a thesis entitled A study of the idea and meaning of God with special reference to the 11th chapter of Bhagavad Gita in the context of Renascent Hinduism under the guidance of P. David. As part of his two-year course, Melanchthon also became a research student at the Christian Institute for the Study of Religion and Society, Bangalore. The institute was headed by M. M. Thomas, then director and Herbert Jai Singh, then assistant director.

When the 1970s began, Melanchthon got qualified to pursue doctoral studies and availed study leave from the United Theological College, Bangalore. He enrolled with the Senate of Serampore College (University) to undertake studies leading to D. Th., specializing in religions. He was a recipient of a study scholarship in 1972 from the World Council of Churches (Theological Education Fund), which he utilized to proceed on research exposure to Lutheran School of Theology at Chicago in the United States. In the ensuing year, by September 1973, he moved to Selly Oak Colleges, Birmingham (United Kingdom), where he continued his research under able scholars from 1973 to 1975. However, by the turn of the academic year 1975–1976, Melanchthon had to return to Bangalore to resume his teaching duties as his request for extension of leave was not granted, a move which brought an end to his doctoral programme.

== Career as pastor and teacher ==
After Melanchthon stepped out of the portals of his seminary in 1961, he was ordained as a pastor of Andhra Evangelical Lutheran Church Society by K. Krupadanam, AELC, then president. Melanchthon then began to minister in Konaseema region at Kothapeta, East Godavari district in the 1960s, where Christianity was propagated in the Delta region by the Lutheran missions in the late 19th century led by a German missionary, Rudolph F. A. Arps. Parishioners were Agricultural labourers and access to Kothapeta, in Konaseema area used to be through a ferry across the Gautami-Godavari River, one of the estuaries of Godavari River, from Kapileswarapuram on the opposite bank. After serving as a pastor, Melanchthon returned to his alma mater in 1965 to take up a postgraduate course.

In 1968, during the principalship of Joshua Russell Chandran, Melanchthon joined as faculty member at United Theological College, Bangalore, where Melanchthon used to teach Religions in India for students pursuing B. D. for nearly two decades until 1988. Many of his graduate students have contributed to the full spectrum of the ministries of the Church in India, who include, R. S. Sugirtharajah, J. W. Gladstone, P. J. Lawrence, S. J. Theodore, Timotheas Hembrom, Dharmakkan Dhanaraj, Paul Rajashekar, H. S. Wilson, Elizabeth Paul, Basil Rebera, Christopher Asir, John Sadananda, Sydney Salins, P. Surya Prakash, D. N. Premnath, M. Mani Chacko, K. David Udayakumar, Evangeline Anderson-Rajkumar, K. Reuben Mark, Ch. Vasantha Rao, Rajula Annie-Watson and others. Among his notable students who specialized in religions, the name of D. I. Hans stands out.

Other co-faculty teaching religions at UTC, Bangalore at different points of time were V. C. Samuel, MOSC, William Powlas Peery, AELC, Herbert Jai Singh, MCI, and Eric J. Lott, CSI, David C. Scott, MCI. In addition to his teaching, Melanchthon also used to render ministerial duties at local congregations around Bangalore at CSI-St. Peter's Telugu Church and other churches.

== Paralytic stroke and death ==
During 1987-1988, while Melanchthon went on an assignment to Leonard Theological College, Jabalpur, he also happened to visit Pachmarhi, a hill station, where he suffered a paralytic stroke. By the time he was brought back to Jabalpur for administering treatment, precious moments were lost due to a lack of immediate medical access, resulting in severe brain damage. Melanchthon was then taken by rail to Bangalore and treated at the Baptist Hospital, Hebbal. By then, E. C. John, CSI, who had already taken up the principalship, ensured that Melanchthon was kept away from teaching assignments until his recovery. Melanchthon gradually began to recover, but remained confined to his quarters in the campus. However, even after nearly six years of sustained treatment, Melanchthon could not recover fully and died on 22 September 1994. Gnana Robinson, CSI, then principal, led the academic community in paying its obeisances. Melanchthon was buried with ecclesiastical honours at Hosur Indian Christian Cemetery, Bangalore.

== Melanchthon and the case of social security for Theologians ==
In Melanchthon's untimely demise, the whole gamut of social security and health insurance coverage of theologians comes to the fore. While the state has provided means through legislation to ensure such safety through savings and health schemes, only a few of these are applied to the theological fraternity in India, who are otherwise employed in institutions registered as legal bodies either through Indian Trusts Act, 1882 (e.g. Bible Society of India), Companies Act, 1956 (e.g. Samavesam of Telugu Baptist Churches), Societies Registration Act, 1860 (e.g. Andhra Christian Theological College), or such other Legislative acts applicable in India. There has only been a selective extension of The Payment of Gratuity Act, 1972, The Employees' State Insurance, 1948, Employees' Provident Funds and Miscellaneous Provident Act, 1952, in theological institutions, and theologians continue to be at risk being at the sole mercy of the institution and its management. A few of the notable theologians who met untimely deaths while still in service include Mutyala Theophilus (1895-1946), D. S. Amalorpavadass (1932-1990), George Soares-Prabhu (1929-1995), and others, with the recent one being Siga Arles (1950-2015). The Cantabrigian and Old Testament Scholar, Victor Premasagar (1927-2005), then on a teaching assignment with Bethel Bible College, Guntur had been at the receiving end due to medical negligence of an ophthalmologist and had issues with visibility and later met his death in the institution, while being its principal.

Somehow, the extended arm of social security as envisaged by the State for the good of every Citizen of India employed in some entity or the other, seems to elude theologians. Christianity in India dates back to AD 52. The Indian yogi and mystic, Jaggi Vasudev, believes that the Church is organized, but he seemed to have said that in matters of organizational setup. In Melanchthon's case, apprehensions were cast on his health issue and usability to the institution, resulting in moves to dislodge him from his quarters due to non-performance of teaching tasks, but it was met with resistance from certain sections of alumni, notable among whom include a New Testament scholar, best known for his administration of the Senate of Serampore College (University) during the 1970s as well as an Old Testament scholar, better known in theological circles for his scholarship of the Old Testament having associated with the Serampore College and Andhra Christian Theological College as faculty member from the 1970s. As such, the principal, E. C. John, chose to tread the ground of humaneness by ensuring social security to a fellow theologian who suffered from a paralytic stroke during the course of his employment with the institution.

Academic offices
Preceded by S. J. Samartha, CSI	Teacher - in - Religions, United Theological College, Bangalore; 1968-1994	Succeeded by William P. Peery, AELC; Eric J. Lott, CSI
Awards
Preceded by R. G. Shaefer, BMS	Recipient of George Howells Prize (History of Religions); 1961	Succeeded by J. A. Gonsalves, CNI
Preceded by V. E. Varghese, MMTSC	Recipient of Senators' Prize in Biblical Studies; 1961	Succeeded by G. S. Albert Ezekiel, CBCNC
