= Dharmakkan Dhanaraj =

Indian Old Testament scholar

The Reverend Doctor D. Dhanaraj, CSI Dr. Phil. (Osnabrück)
- Born: Dharmakkan Dhanaraj; 18 December 1950; Tamil Nadu, India
- Died: 16 October 2017 (aged 66); Mangalore (Karnataka), buried in CSI-Gorigudda Cemetery, Mangalore.
- Other name: Dhanaraj Ayyagaru
- Citizenship: India
- Education: B.Sc. (Madurai), B. D. (Serampore), M.Th. (Serampore), Dr. Phil. (Osnabrück)
- Occupations: Pastor and Teacher
- Years active: 1974-2015

Ecclesiastical career
- Religion: Christianity
- Church: Church of South India (A Uniting church comprising Wesleyan Methodist, Congregational, Lutheran, Calvinist and Anglican missionary societies – SPG, WMMS, LMS, Basel Mission, CMS, and the Church of England)
- Writings: Towards a fruitful living,.ref>D. Dhanaraj, Towards a fruitful living in United Theological College Magazine 1977, Volume XLIV, 1977, pp. 48-51 available at the Archives in the library of Karnataka Theological College, Mangalore.</ref>; The relationship of man to God as expressed in the piety of selected Psalms.; Theological significance of the motif of enemies in selected psalms of individual lament.; Structural Approach to Psalm Exegesis: Psalm 8 and 54 as Examples.; A Survey of the History of Old Testament Theology
- Congregations: Pollibetta and Kushalanagar
- Offices held: Teacher - in - Old Testament, Karnataka Theological College, Mangalore (1978-2015), Principal, Moegling Institute of German Language, Mangalore (1992-2015)
- Title: The Reverend Doctor

Dharmakkan Dhanaraj (18 December 1950– 16 October 2017) was an Indian Old Testament scholar who taught at the Karnataka Theological College, Mangalore, a seminary established in 1965 and affiliated to the nation's first university, the Senate of Serampore College (University).

After serving more than 40 years for the cause of spiritual formation and the teaching of German language studies, through the Karnataka Theological College and the Moegling Institute for German Language, both in Mangalore, Dhanaraj died on Monday, 16 October 2017 in Mangalore after a brief illness and his funeral mass was conducted at 16:00 hours on Tuesday, 17 October 2017, by Bishop emeritus John Sadananda, CSI, at the CSI-Shanthi Cathedral, Balmatta, Mangalore in the presence of Sydney Salins, CSI, H. R. Cabral, CSI, Annie Watson, CSI, F. Anilkumar, CSI, Bishop emeritus C. L. Furtado, CSI, D. R. Sadananda, CSI and Mohan Manoraj, CSI, the present CSI Bishop - in - Mangalore. Dhanaraj's demise comes close on the heels of the notable Old Testament Scholar, Bishop emeritus Samuel Amirtham, CSI, who departed during the last week of September 2017.

== Contribution ==
As a Scholar on Psalms, Dhanaraj's work was published in 1992 and simultaneously reviewed in three German journals, namely the Zeitschrift für die Alttestamentliche Wissenschaft (1994), the Verkündigung und Forschung (1995) and the Theologische Literaturzeitung (1995) followed by The Catholic Biblical Quarterly (1996) and has also been listed in three of the annual editions of Elenchus of Biblica (Volumes 8, 10, 12 of 1992, 1994, 1996). Ellen T. Charry observes that Dhanaraj divided Psalm 3 into three segments depending on point of view taken by the speaker, a fact reiterated by John J. Ahn. Further, Dhanaraj's research work has been held in nearly 75 library holdings ranging from Seminaries to state universities and National libraries across Africa, Asia, Australia, Europe, North America and South America and has been referred by many Scholars over the years' including his Doktorvater,

- 1989 (Eckart Otto), Rechtsgeschichte der Redaktionen im Kodex Ešnunna und im "Bundesbuch": Eine redaktionsgeschichtliche und rechtsvergleichende Studie zu altbabylonischen und altisraelitischen Rechtsuberlieferungen,
- 1989 (Edited by G. Johannes Botterweck, Helmer Ringgren, Heinz-Josef Fabry), Theological Dictionary of the Old Testament, Volume 12,
- 1998 (Ulrich Bail), Gegen das Schweigen klagen. Eine intertextuelle Studie zu Psalm 6, Psalm 55 und 2 Samuel 13,1-22,
- 2005 (Daniel J. Estes), Handbook on the Wisdom Books and Psalms,
- 2011 (John J. Ahn), Exile as Forced Migrations: A Sociological, Literary, and Theological approach on the displacement and resettlement of the southern kingdom of Judah,
- 2012 (Wilton Gerardo Sánchez Castelblanco), Que les caigan brasas de fuego (Sal 140,11) - Comentario exegético del salmo 140 (Let burning flames come down on them (Psalm 140,11) - Exegetical commentary of Psalm 140),
- 2013 (D. Keith Campbell), Of Heroes and Villains: The Influence of the Psalmic Lament on Synoptic Characterization,
- 2014 (W. Dennis Tucker Jr.), Constructing and Deconstructing Power in Psalms 107–150,
- 2015 (Ellen T. Charry), Psalms 1-50 (Brazos Theological Commentary on the Bible),

== General and spiritual studies ==
After initial graduate studies at the CSI-American College in Madurai, Tamil Nadu where Dhanaraj pursued studies in sciences leading to B.Sc. in 1969, he discerned his avocation towards priesthood and became an aspirant with the Madurai-Ramnad Diocese of the Church of South India, then under the bishopric of The Right Reverend George Devadas, CSI who became his Spiritual Confessor and led Dhanaraj to take up seminary studies leading to Priesthood.

=== Spiritual studies ===
Dhanaraj then underwent ministerial formation at the United Theological College, Bangalore between 1970 and 1974 during the Principalship of J. R. Chandran, CSI, studying for a Bachelor of Divinity (B. D.) under faculty comprising The Rev. G. D. Melanchthon, AELC, W. P. Peery, AELC, E. C. John, CSI and others.

During Dhanaraj's study period between 1970 and 1974, his companions included D. I. Hans, CSI, P. J. Lawrence, CSI, J. W. Gladstone, CSI, Sydney Salins, CSI, John Sadananda, CSI, P. Surya Prakash, CSI and others who were pursuing graduate courses while R. Yesurathnam, CSI, D. W. Jesudoss, TELC, G. Babu Rao, CBCNC, Basil Rebera^{Laity}, D. S. Satyaranjan, IPC, Nitoy Achümi, NBCC, Timotheas Hembrom, NELC, S. John Theodore, CSI and others were pursuing postgraduate courses at varying intervals including G. Solomon, STBC who came there for a specialized course in Biblical Hebrew.

In the ensuing convocation of the Senate of Serampore College (University) held on February 1, 1975 at the Serampore College, Serampore under the Registrarship of C. Devasahayam, CBCNC, Dhanaraj was awarded a Bachelor of Divinity degree where the Convocation Commemoration Mass in Serampore was conducted by the Old Testament Teacher G. Babu Rao, CBCNC of Serampore College at the CNI-St. Olave's Church, Serampore.

=== Advanced spiritual studies ===
Again from 1976 to 1978, Dhanaraj studied for a postgraduate course during the Principalship of J. R. Chandran, CSI specialising in Old Testament under E. C. John, CSI, G. M. Butterworth, CoE and Gerhard Wehmeier, EKD and submitted a dissertation entitled The relationship of man to God as expressed in the piety of selected Psalms and was awarded a Master of Theology (M. Th.) degree by the university under the Registrarship of D. S. Satyaranjan, IPC who had by that time become Registrar of the university succeeding J. T. Krogh, NELC. The 1979 convocation of the university was held at Secunderabad in February at the Andhra Christian Theological College led by the Old Testament Scholars, Victor Premasagar, CSI and G. Babu Rao, CBCNC who had by that time moved from Serampore to Secunderabad and again conducted the Convocation Commemoration Mass at the St. Gregorious Malankara Orthodox Syrian Cathedral in the neighbourhood of the college.

During Dhanaraj's second period of studies at Bangalore between 1976 and 1978, his graduate companions included S. W. Meshack, IELC, M. Mani Chacko, CSI, K. David Udayakumar, SALC and others.

=== Research studies ===
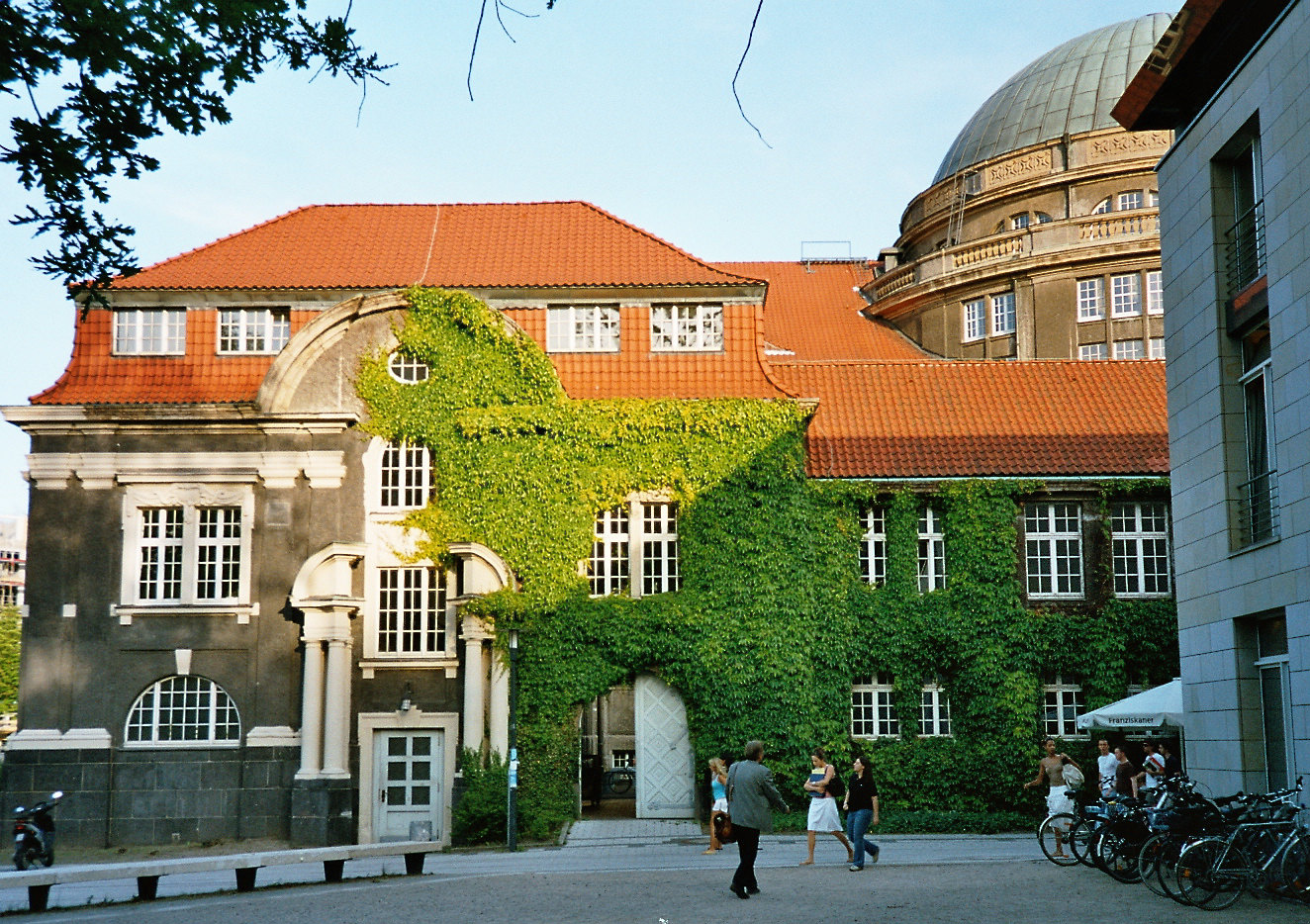
The University of Hamburg where Dhanaraj began his research studies in 1979.

After a period of German language studies at the Goethe Institute, Pune during the final years of the 1970s, Dhanaraj moved to Germany enrolling as a student for the period 1980-1985 and began researching at the University of Hamburg under Prof. Klaus Koch and Prof. Eckart Otto entitling his dissertation as Theological significance of the motif of enemies in selected psalms of individual lament. Dhanaraj's other companions at the University of Hamburg included Godwin Shiri, CSI J. W. Gladstone, CSI Ofosu Adutwum, PCG and also G. Babu Rao, CBCNC who went there on a 2½ years research exposure to the university.

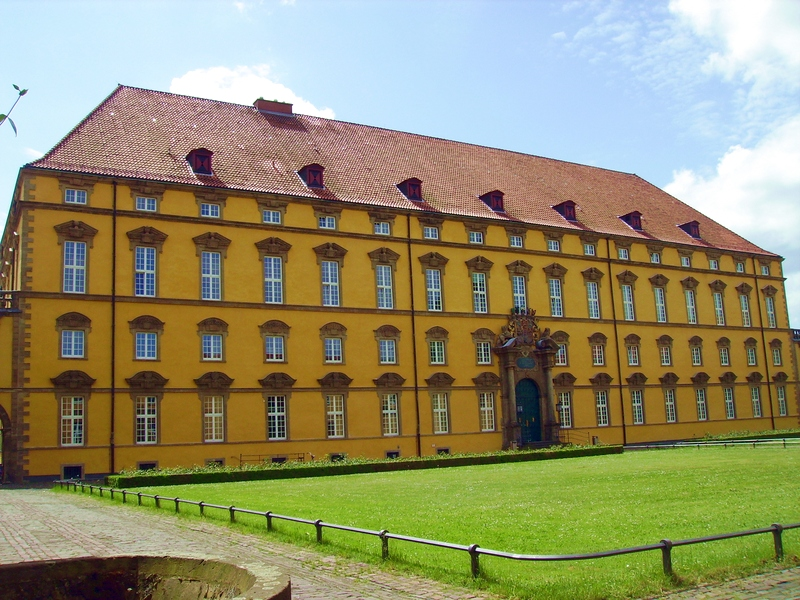
University of Osnabrück in Lower Saxony which awarded the doctoral degree to Dhanaraj in 1988.

Dhanaraj later transferred himself to the University of Osnabrück in 1986 as his guide, Prof. Eckart Otto had moved out from the University of Hamburg to join the University of Osnabrück and Dhanaraj continued his research there under Prof. Eckart Otto and was awarded a Doctorate of Philosophy in the year 1988 by the University of Osnabrück and a couple of years later, his thesis was published in 1992 by J. J. Augustin based in Glückstadt, Germany.

== Ecclesiastical ministry ==
=== Pastoral ===
After completion of seminary studies by 1974 at the Protestant Regional Theologiate United Theological College in Bangalore, Dhanaraj expressed interest to begin pastoral work in Karnataka and sought transfer from the Madurai-Ramnad Diocese (headquartered in Madurai under the bishopric of The Right Reverend George Devadas, CSI) to the Karnataka Southern Diocese (headquartered in Mangalore under the bishopric of The Right Reverend S. R. Furtado, CSI) for which the process of Incardination and excardination was put in place leading to his excardination from the CSI Madurai-Ramnad Diocese and subsequent incardination into the CSI Karnataka Southern Diocese.

Dhanaraj then began pastoring parishes falling under the ecclesiastical purview of the Karnataka Southern Diocese of the Church of South India beginning with the Christ Church, Pollibetta, and to the Maddock Memorial Church, Kushalanagar, both falling under the civil jurisdiction of Kodagu district in south west Karnataka.

=== Seminary ===
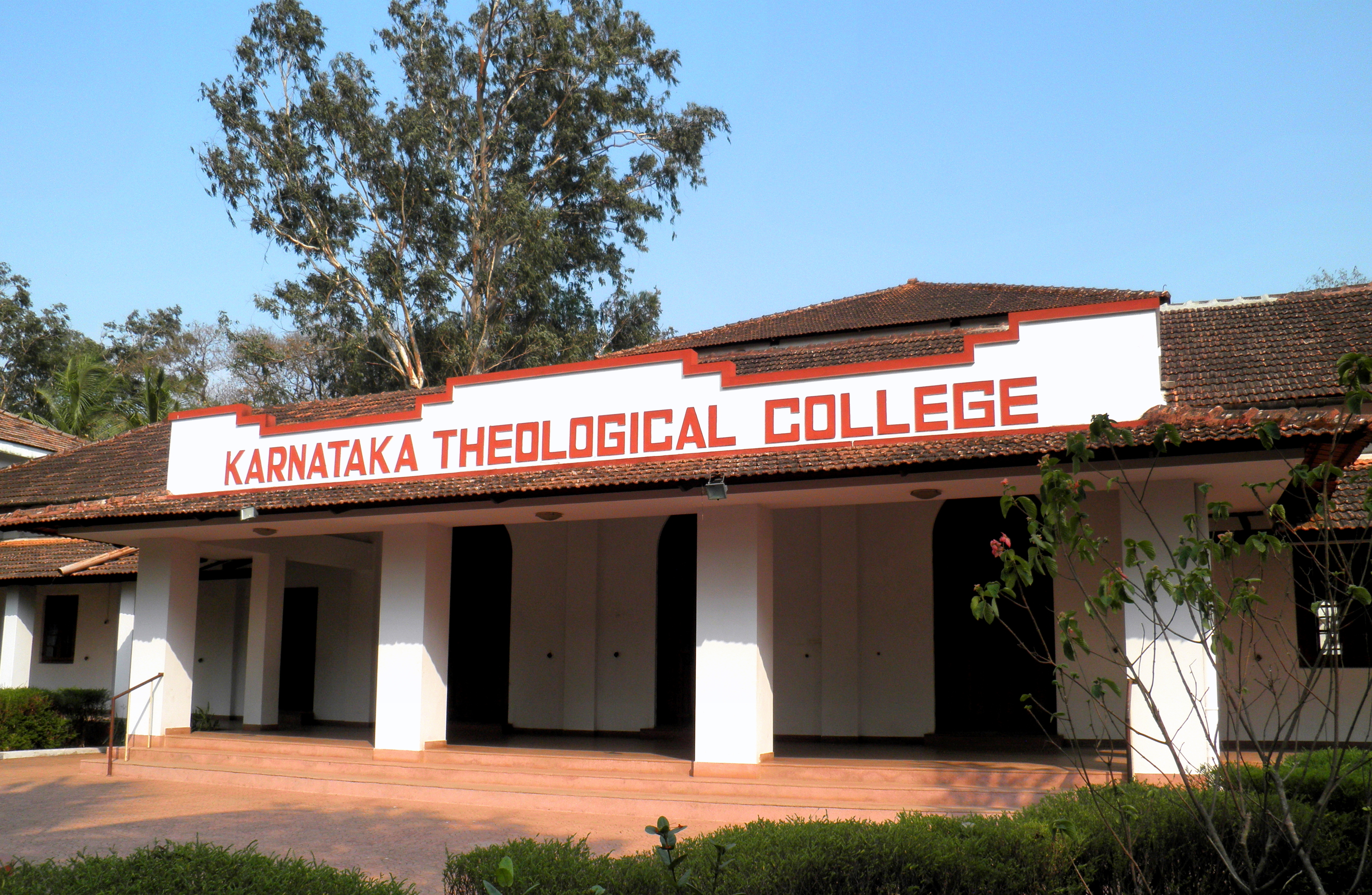
Karnataka Theological College, Mangalore where Dhanaraj taught for more than three decades.

Dhanaraj moved to Mangalore in 1978 after completing his postgraduate studies in Old Testament at the Protestant Regional Theologiate in Bangalore and began teaching at the Karnataka Theological College along with C. D. Jathanna, CSI and also John Sadananda, CSI. After two years' of teaching, Dhanaraj proceeded on a 5-year study leave for research studies to Germany in 1980 and returned in 1986 to resume teaching of the Old Testament, Hebrew language and Aramaic language to ministerial candidates studying for Bachelor of Divinity course offered through the Senate of Serampore College (University). In 2003, Dhanaraj went on sabbatical leave to the Lutheran Theological Seminary at Philadelphia and taught courses during spring semester.

== German language teaching ==
With Dhanaraj's expertise in the German language, the Moegling Institute for German Language (permanently affiliated to the University of Mangalore), the only German language institute in Mangalore set up within the premises of the Karnataka Theological College took Dhanaraj as one of its faculty members after his return from Germany in 1983 and after nearly a decade of teaching, Dhanaraj became Principal of the institute in 1992. The institute has been notable for admitting students with basic school certificate and metamorphose students into basic German language speakers within a year and also award them a proper UGC recognised certificate from the Mangalore University.

=== Mangalore University Syndicate Member ===
In 2004, when the University of Mangalore Syndicate was reconstituted during the term of Vice Chancellor B. Hanumaiah, the university included Dhanaraj as a representative of the Moegling Institute of German Language in the newly reconstituted 22-member highest body of the university.

Academic offices
Preceded by C. D. Jathanna, CSI; 1961 - 1983, John Sadananda, CSI; 1974 - 2009	Teacher - in - Old Testament, Karnataka Theological College, Mangalore; 1978-2015	Succeeded by K. Sagar Sundar Raj, CSI; 2012-Present
Preceded by F. S Furtado^{Laity} 1979 - 1992	Principal, Moegling Institute of German Language, Mangalore; 1992 - 2015	Succeeded by Fedric Anilkumar, CSI; 2015 -Present
