= Samuel Amirtham =

Indian Bishop and Old Testament Scholar

Bishop Samuel Amirtham, CSI D. D. Honoris causa (Serampore)
- The Right Reverend
- Church: Church of South India (A Uniting church comprising Wesleyan Methodist, Congregational and Anglican missionary societies – SPG, WMMS, LMS, CMS, and the Church of England)
- Diocese: South Kerala
- Appointed: 20 May 1990
- In office: 1990-1997
- Retired: 19 August 1997
- Predecessor: Isaiah Jesudason, CSI
- Successor: J. W. Gladstone, CSI
- Previous posts: Teacher - in - Old Testament, United Theological College, Bangalore, (1963-1969), Principal, Tamil Nadu Theological Seminary, Madurai (1969-1978), Director, Programme on Theological Education, World Council of Churches, Geneva (1980-1990)

Orders
- Ordination: 1957 by A. H. Legg, CSI
- Consecration: 20 May 1990 by P. Victor Premasagar, CSI and Vasanth P. Dandin, CSI
- Rank: Bishop

Personal details
- Born: Samuel Amirtham; 19 August 1932 Parassala, Kerala
- Died: 26 September 2017 (aged 85) Parassala, Kerala
- Buried: Parassala
- Denomination: Christianity
- Parents: Mother: Smt. Annal, Father:Sri J. Amirtham
- Occupation: Pastor
- Education: B. Sc. (Madras), B. D. (Serampore), M. A. (Jerusalem), Dr. Theol. (Hamburg)
- Alma mater: Madras Christian College, Tambaram (Tamil Nadu), United Theological College, Bangalore (Karnataka), Hebrew University of Jerusalem (Israel), Missions Academy at the University of Hamburg, Hamburg (Germany)

Samuel Amirtham (19 August 1932 – 26 September 2017) was an Indian Bishop and Old Testament Scholar who taught in Spiritual formation centres affiliated to Senate of Serampore College (University), India's first University {a University under Section 2 (f) of the University Grants Commission Act, 1956} founded by the Baptist Missions led by Joshua Marshman, William Carey, and William Ward.

In the 1980s, Amirtham was Director on the Programme for Theological Education of the World Council of Churches, Geneva where he substantially contributed to Ecumenism and returned to India in the 1990s when he became Bishop - in - South Kerala until he stepped down from the bishopric in 1997 on attaining superannuation.

== Studies ==
After general studies leading to B. Sc. specializing in Physics from the Madras Christian College, Tambaram, Amirtham took up teaching at the Scott Christian College, Nagercoil until he evinced interest in Spirituality to take up the profession of Priesthood enrolling as a ministerial candidate under the Diocese of South Kerala, then under the bishopric of A. H. Legg who became his Spiritual Confessor, eventually leading to his enrollment at the Protestant Regional Theologiate in Bangalore.

=== Spiritual studies ===
In 1953, Amirtham joined the United Theological College, Bangalore, then under the Principalships of the College's first Old Testament Teacher, Max Hunter Harrison, ABCFM, and followed by the notable Systematic Theologian, Joshua Russell Chandran, CSI, studying for a three-year period ending in 1957 and was awarded the graduate degree of B. D. by then Registrar of the Serampore, William Stewart.

During the period 1953-1957, Amirtham's companions undergoing Spiritual formation at varying intervals included P. Victor Premasagar, CSI, E. C. John, CSI, C. D. Jathanna, CSI, G. B. Devasahayam, CSI, K. E. Swamidass, CSI, M. C. Mani, CSI, and others.

=== Advanced spiritual studies ===
While teaching at his alma mater, the United Theological College, Bangalore in the 1960s, Amirtham qualified for undertaking research studies at the University of Hamburg, Hamburg, Germany enrolling for the Doctor of Theology programme specializing in Old Testament under Hans-Joachim Kraus and Klaus Koch, and was awarded the doctoral degree in 1969 based on his dissertation entitled The presence of God in the Psalms.

Amirtham became the second student from India to have specialized in Old Testament in the University of Hamburg after C. D. Jathanna, CSI.

== Ecclesiastical Ministry ==
=== Servanthood ===
In 1957, after ordination by South Kerala Diocese led by A. H. Legg, Amirtham began serving parishes within its ecclesiastical jurisdiction until 1963 when he was reassigned to take up the role of Spiritual formator.

==== Bishopric ====
In 1990, when Isaiah Jesudason retired from the bishopric on attaining superannuation, Amirtham who had by that time returned to India contested the vacant bishopric and was elected as the fourth successor of A. H. Legg as Bishop - in - South Kerala and principally consecrated on 20 May 1990 at the Church of South India-Mateer Memorial Church, Trivandrum by Old Testament Scholar and Moderator of the Church of South India Synod, P. Victor Premasagar, CSI and co-consecrated by Deputy Moderator, Vasanth P. Dandin, Church of South India.

Marathakavalli David, Church of South India, the first ordained Woman priest of the South Kerala Diocese was already ordained a year before Amirtham assumed the bishopric and Gender equality, to the extent possible, continued to be maintained by Amirtham together with his ministerial companions in the Church of South India Synod.

In 1997, Amirtham vacated the bishopric on attaining superannuation resulting in Sede vacante that was filled up with the appointment of J. W. Gladstone as the successor of Amirtham.

=== Teaching ===
==== Spiritual formator ====
In 1963, Amirtham became a faculty member at the United Theological College, Bangalore headed by Joshua Russell Chandran, CSI teaching along with notable faculty that included Stanley Jedidiah Samartha, CSI, V. C. Samuel, MOSC and others and also availed study leave for doctoral studies returning in 1969. Meanwhile, Ecumenism brought together two seminaries in Tamil Nadu leading to the formation of the Tamil Nadu Theological Seminary, Madurai in 1969 where Amirtham moved to and became the first principal and continued to teach Old Testament and Biblical Hebrew.

Old Testament scholarship and teaching reached a pinnacle in the 1970s with acknowledged Scholars at the helm in Spiritual formation centres all over the country with Gnana Robinson, CSI and Samuel Amirtham at the Tamil Nadu Theological Seminary, Madurai, C. D. Jathanna, CSI, D. Dhanaraj, CSI and John Sadananda, CSI at the Karnataka Theological College, Mangalore, E. C. John, G. M. Butterworth and Gerhard Wehmeier at the United Theological College, Bangalore, Kallarakkal Abraham George, MOSC at the Orthodox Pazhaya Seminary, Kottayam, K. V. Mathew, MMTSC at the Mar Thoma Theological Seminary, Kottayam and Victor Premasagar, CSI and G. Solomon, STBC. While this was so, Rene Van de Walle, SJ led the Old Testament studies at the Jnana-Deepa Vidyapeeth, Pune while John D. W. Watts, SBC and G. Babu Rao, CBCNC taught at Serampore College, Serampore.

==== Administrator ====
In 1969, Amirtham was appointed the first principal of the Tamil Nadu Theological Seminary in Madurai. The period 1970s, witnessed Old Testament Scholars leading schools of Christian missions with Samuel Amirtham at the Tamil Nadu Theological Seminary, Madurai, Victor Premasagar, CSI at the Andhra Christian Theological College and C. D. Jathanna, CSI at the Karnataka Theological College, Mangalore.

Amirtham was known for introducing the gurukulam model of community living at the seminary, and is known for having established a living theology concept.

=== Promoting ecumenism ===
He was Director of the Programme on Theological Education, World Council of Churches from 1980 to 1990. In 1986, Amirtham and C. H. S. introduced a new concept when they presented "The Teaching of Ecumenics" at the WCC. The next year, they co-edited a book by the same name.

=== Other initiatives ===
He established the Palmyrah Workers Development Society (PWDS) in 1977.

== Honors ==
Spiritual formators teaching in affiliated institutions of the Senate of Serampore College (University) contributed essays honouring Amirtham beginning with the Tamil Nadu Theological Seminary, Madurai which published For the Sake of the Gospel in 1980 edited by Gnana Robinson, CSI followed by Board of Theological Education of the Senate of Serampore College under the leadership of K. C. Abraham proceeded to publish a contributory volume in 1993 titled New Horizons in Ecumenism: Essays in Honour of Bishop Samuel Amirtham.

In 1988, Amirtham was awarded a Doctor of Divinity degree by Honoris causa during the tenure of D. S. Satyaranjan, IPC as Registrar of the Senate of Serampore College (University).

Academic offices
Preceded by E. C. John, CSI; 1959-1993	Teacher - in - Old Testament, United Theological College, Bengaluru; 1963-1969	Succeeded by G. M. Butterworth, 1972-1978
Preceded by Position created	Principal, Tamil Nadu Theological Seminary, Madurai; 1969-1978	Succeeded by Gnana Robinson
Other offices
Preceded by Aharon Sapsezian	Director, Programme on Theological Education, World Council of Churches, Geneva; 1980-1990	Succeeded by John Samuel Pobee
Church of South India Ecclesiastical Titles
Preceded by Isaiah Jesudason, CSI; 1973-1990	CSI-Bishop - in - South Kerala, Trivandrum; 1990-1997	Succeeded by J. W. Gladstone, CSI; 1997-2011
