= Paul Rajashekar =

Indian Lutheran theologian

The Reverend Paul Rajashekar
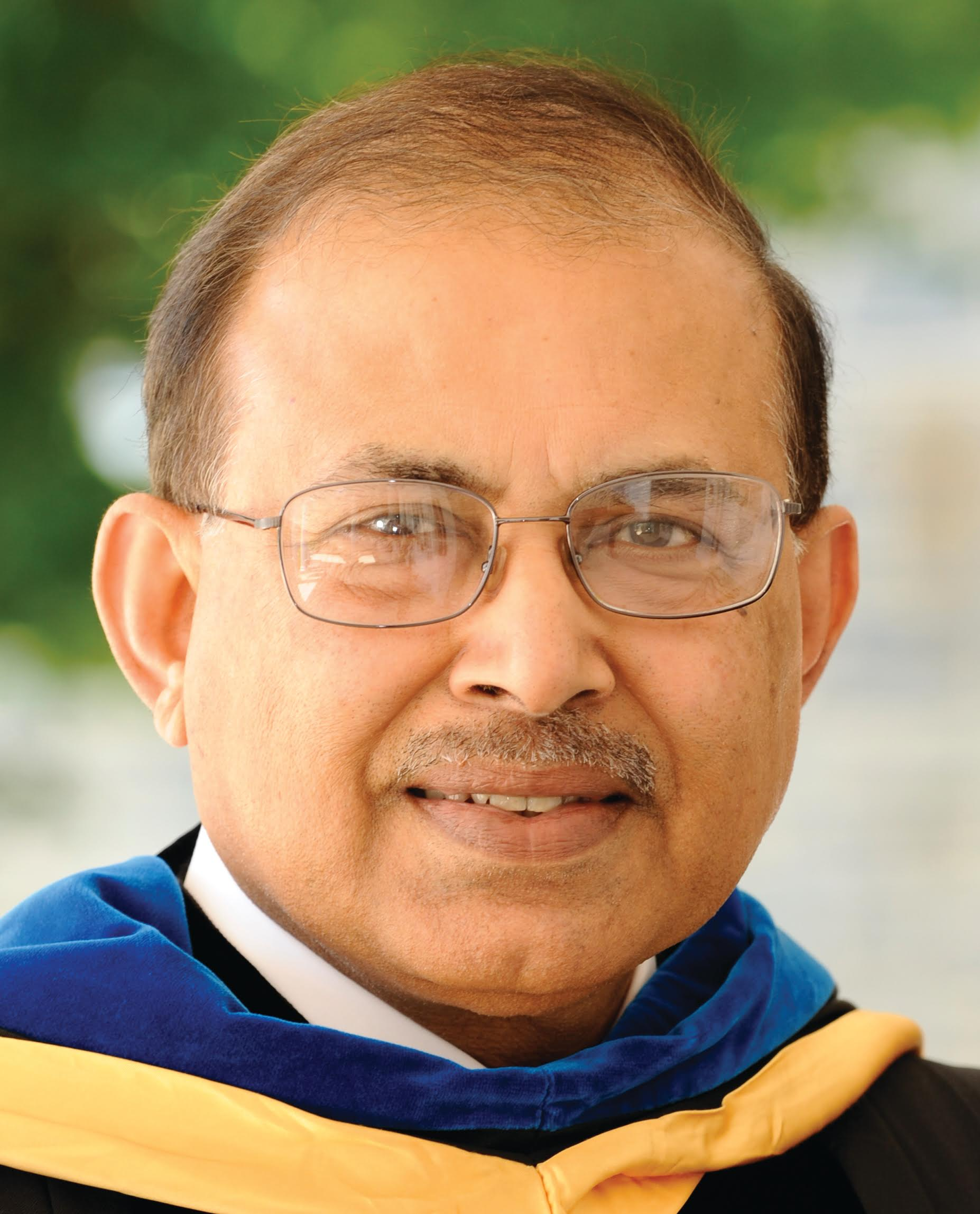
- Born: J. Paul William Rajashekar; 2 June 1948 (age 77); Mangalore, Mysore State, India
- Citizenship: United States
- Education: B. A. (Mysore) (1968), B. D. (Serampore) (1971); S. T. M. (Concordia) (1974), Ph. D. (Iowa) (1981)
- Alma mater: St. Philomena's College, Mysore (India), United Theological College, Bangalore (India), Concordia Seminary, St. Louis (United States), University of Iowa, Iowa (United States)
- Occupation: Theological Teacher
- Years active: 1971-present
- Religion: Christianity
- Church: India Evangelical Lutheran Church (IELC)
- Ordained: 1972
- Congregations served: IELC Church, Ambur (India) (1971-1972), Good Shepherd Lutheran Church, Wellman (United States) (1976-1979)
- Offices held: Councillor, Evangelical Lutheran Church in America Council (2006-2010),
- Title: Luther D. Reed Professor of Systematic Theology Emeritus

J. William Paul Rajashekar (born 1948), better known as Paul Rajashekar, is a systematic theologian who is the Luther D. Reed Emeritus Professor of Systematic Theology at United Lutheran Seminary, Pennsylvania Rajashekar is best known for his writings on Martin Luther's theology, ecumenism and inter-faith dialogue. He grew up in a setting of religions in India and has oft-spoken at numerous platforms and quotes Max Mueller, (adapted)...one who knows one (religion), knows none.

== Education ==
Rajashekar received a B.A. at St. Philomena's College, Mysore in 1968 He then chose the avocation of priesthood and approached the ecclesiastical office of the India Evangelical Lutheran Church in which he became an aspirante.

=== Graduate ===
Rajashekar joined the United Theological College, Bangalore {affiliated to Senate of Serampore College (University)} in the year 1968 during the Principalship of the Systematic Theologian Joshua Russell Chandran. This was the same year that the religions scholar, G. D. Melanchthon, AELC joined the seminary to begin his teaching. The 3-year study period of Rajashekar in Bangalore coincided with the study periods of R. S. Sugirtharajah, S. J. Theodore, T. Hembrom, H. S. Wilson, D. I. Hans, P. J. Lawrence, Basil Rebera, J. W. Gladstone, D. Dhanaraj, Sydney Salins and as well as that of D. W. Jesudoss and Regunta Yesurathnam who were pursuing postgraduate studies. After a 3-year course in spirituality, Rajashekar was awarded a Bachelor of Divinity degree by the University during its convocation held in 1972 during the Registrarship of Chetti Devasahayam, CBCNC.

=== Postgraduate and doctoral ===
In 1972, Rajashekar proceeded to the United States to pursue a postgraduate course in theology leading to S.T.M., specializing in Patristics during 1972-1974 at the Concordia Seminary, St. Louis and left for India to begin teaching at the Gurukul Lutheran Theological College, Chennai and returned to the United States in 1976 to enroll as a doctoral candidate at the University of Iowa, Iowa where he researched in Systematic theology and History of Religions with a dissertation titled Faith Active in Love and Truth Realized in Love: A Comparative Study of the Ethics of Martin Luther and Mahatma Gandhi and was awarded a Ph. D. in 1981.

== Career ==
During 1971-1972, Rajashekar served as a Parish Priest of the Ambur Synod of the IELC. In 1974, Rajashekar began to teach at the Gurukul Lutheran Theological College, Chennai in which the IELC is a participating Church Society. After a two-year teaching stint at the Seminary, he proceeded on doctoral studies to the United States only to return in 1981 and joined the United Theological College, Bangalore where he taught for nearly four years until 1984 when he moved to Geneva to take up an assignment with the Lutheran World Federation.

From 1984 through 1991, Rajashekar was on the staff of the Lutheran World Federation based at Geneva, Switzerland, and made a significant contribution as Executive Secretary for Dialogue with People of other Faiths and Ideologies.

In 1991, Rajashekar became a member of faculty of the Lutheran Theological Seminary at Philadelphia where he rose to the position of Academic Dean from 2000 to 2012, returning to the teaching faculty as the Luther D. Reed Professor in Systematic Theology until his retirement from its succeeding institution, United Lutheran Seminary, at the end of 2020.

== Writings ==
=== Books ===
Rajashekar, Paul (1990). Luther and Islam: An Asian Perspective. Vandenhoeck und Ruprecht, Göttingen.

=== Articles in books ===
- Rajashekar, Paul (1982). "Apostolicity and Apostolic Succession" (PDF). In George, K. M.; E. Hoefer, Herbert (eds.). A Dialogue begins: Papers, Minutes and Agreed Statements from the Lutheran-Orthodox Dialogue in India 1978-1982. Gurukul/Sophia, Chennai/Kottayam. pp. 203–213.
- Rajashekar, Paul (1982). "The Sacramental Signs of the Church" (PDF). In George, K. M.; E. Hoefer, Herbert (eds.). A Dialogue begins: Papers, Minutes and Agreed Statements from the Lutheran-Orthodox Dialogue in India 1978-1982. Gurukul/Sophia, Chennai/Kottayam. pp. 247–257.
- Rajashekar, Paul; von Brück, Michael (2001). "Hinduism; Hinduism and Christianity; India". In Fahlbusch, Erwin; William Bromiley, Geoffrey (eds.). Evangelisches Kirchenlexikon. William B. Eerdmans Publishing Company, Grand Rapids.
- Rajashekar, Paul (2009). "Theological Education for Interfaith Engagement: The Philadelphia Story" (PDF). In Roozen, David; Hadsell, Heidi (eds.). Changing the Way Seminaries Teach: Pedagogies for Interfaith Dialogue. Hartford Seminary, Hartford. pp. 157–182.
- Rajashekar, Paul (2009). "Rethinking Lutheran Engagement with Religious Plurality" (PDF). In L. Bloomquist, Karen (ed.). Transformative Theological Perspectives, Theology in the Life of the Church. Vol. 6. Lutheran University Press, Minneapolis. pp. 105–116.
