= George Michael Butterworth =

British Old Testament scholar

The Reverend Doctor G. M. Butterworth
- Born: George Michael Butterworth
- Education: Ph.D.
- Alma mater: King's College, London
- Occupations: Pastor and Teacher

Ecclesiastical career
- Religion: Christianity
- Congregations: Broughton Community Church
- Offices held: Teacher - in - Old Testament, United Theological College, Bangalore (1972-1978); Lecturer - in - Old Testament, Oak Hill Theological College, London
- Title: The Reverend Doctor

G. M. Butterworth is an Old Testament scholar who taught at the United Theological College, Bangalore from 1972 through 1978 and later on moved to TAFTEE in Bangalore and finally to England where he continued to bring out the message of the Old Testament.

== Writings ==
=== Books ===
- 1987, Understanding Old Testament History Today (Joshua-Esther),
- 1989, The Structure of the Book of Zechariah,
- 1992, Structure and the Book of Zechariah,
- 2003, Leviticus and Numbers: A Bible Commentary for Every Day,

=== Articles ===
- undated, The Revelation of the Divine Name?,
- 1978, You Pity the Plant : A Misunderstanding,
- 1985, Evidence for the Prosecution,

=== Notes ===
- 1997, A note on rhm in New International Dictionary of Old Testament Theology and Exegesis,
- 1997, A note on nḥm in New International Dictionary of Old Testament Theology and Exegesis,

== Teaching ==
Butterworth joined the United Theological College, Bangalore in the year 1972 when Joshua Russell Chandran was its Principal. The period was eventful as the seminary in Bangalore as it had a few seminarians specializing in Old Testament studies who include,

- 1970–1973, Timotheas Hembrom of Bishop’s College, Calcutta,
- 1970–1973, Basil Rebera of the Bible Society of India,
- 1971–1973, G. Babu Rao who was entrusted by the Bible Society of India with the OT Telugu language translation,
- 1972–1974, S. J. Theodore of the Church of South India, Diocese of Karimnagar,
- 1972–1975, Nitoy Achümi, also associated with the Bible Society of India in its Naga language translation,
- 1975–1977, R. Daniel Premkumar, associated with the Church of South India Synod,
- 1976–1978, D. Dhanaraj, taught at the Karnataka Theological College,
- 1977–1979, J. Bhaskar Jeyaraj of South Asia Institute of Advanced Christian Studies

When Butterworth began teaching at the seminary in 1972 in Bangalore, his colleague was E. C. John and a year later in 1973, they were joined by Gerhard Wehmeier, a notable Old Testament scholar and the three of them led the Old Testament scholarship in Bangalore. While this was so, the Old Testament studies in Serampore College, Serampore were led by the notable Old Testament Scholar, John D. W. Watts and G. Babu Rao who had by then moved to Serampore to begin his teaching. Incidentally, it was Butterworth who guided the graduate thesis of John Sadananda, the present Master of the Senate of Serampore College (University).

Academic offices
Preceded by Samuel Amirtham	Teacher - in - Old Testament; United Theological College, Bangalore; 1972-1978	Succeeded by Theodore N. Swanson
