= D. I. Hans =

Religions Scholar

David Emmanuel Hans alias D. I. Hans
- Born: Karnataka, India
- Occupation: Theologian
- Writings: 1979, A Historical-Critical Study of Basava's Ethical Teachings; 1984, Vīraśaiva sāhitya raśmi: A comprehensive bibliography on Veerashaiva literature in Kannada, English, Sanskrit, Hindi, Marathi, Urdu, Telugu and Tamil
- Congregations served: Church of South India Karnataka Southern Diocese
- Title: The Reverend

D. I. Hans is a Religions Scholar who researched on Vijayanagara literature in Kannada, especially the Veerashaiva writings with special reference to Basavanna. Hans used Historical criticism to study Basavanna's ethical teachings. As a Veerashaiva Scholar, Hans also prepared a bibliography on the existing Veerashaiva literature available in some of the Languages of India, namely, Sanskrit, Hindi, Marathi, Urdu, Telugu and Tamil.

Hans teaches Religions at the Protestant Regional Seminary in Mangalore, the Karnataka Theological College, a Seminary established in 1965 and affiliated to the nation's first University, the Senate of Serampore College (University).

== Studies ==
=== Graduate ===
From 1968-1971, Hans studied a graduate degree for undergoing ministerial formation leading to Bachelor of Divinity (B. D.) at the United Theological College, Bangalore under the Principalship of Joshua Russell Chandran. During his student days, the companions of Hans at the College included S. J. Theodore, Timotheas Hembrom, H. S. Wilson, P. J. Lawrence, Basil Rebera, J. W. Gladstone and others who were undergoing ministerial formation during successive years'. In the ensuing convocation of the Senate of Serampore College (University), Hans was awarded a graduate degree by the University during the Registrarship of C. Devasahayam.

=== Research studies ===
For postgraduate studies, Hans again studied at the Protestant Regional Seminary in Bangalore from 1977 to 1979, specializing in Religions under G. D. Melanchthon, William Peery and Eric J. Lott, the three of whom hailed from the Missions in Andhra Pradesh with the latter two having taught at the Andhra Christian Theological College, Hyderabad. During the period of his studies at the Seminary, the other postgraduate companions of Hans included D. Dhanaraj, R. Joseph and others studying during successive years'. Hans titled dissertation Critical Evaluation of the Contribution of the Hindu Code Bill to the status of women in the Hindu Society was done under the supervision of Hunter P. Mabry and was awarded a postgraduate degree by the University in the successive convocation of the University during the Registrarship of D. S. Satyaranjan.

== Ecclesiastical ministry ==
As a Teacher of Religions, Hans began to teach at a Seminary notable for its Religions Scholar, S. J. Samartha.

Academic offices
Preceded by S. J. Samartha	Teacher-in-Religions; Karnataka Theological College, Mangalore; 1979-Present	Succeeded by -
