= Gerhard Wehmeier =

German scholar

The Reverend Doctor Gerhard Wehmeier EKD
- Born: Gerhard Wehmeier; July 12, 1935; Lemgo, North Rhine-Westphalia, Germany
- Died: April 25, 2009 (aged 73); Immenhausen, Hesse, Germany
- Citizenship: Germany
- Education: Dr. Theol.
- Alma mater: Basel University, Switzerland
- Occupations: Pastor and Teacher
- Years active: 1962–2000
- Religion: Christianity
- Church: Evangelical Church of Hesse Electorate-Waldeck
- Ordained: 1962
- Congregations served: Kassel-Wilhelmshöhe (1962–1968); United Church, Washington (2000–2003)
- Offices held: Teacher – in – Old Testament, United Theological College, Bangalore (1973–1978); Director, Hofgeismar Seminary, Hofgeismar (1980–1989)
- Title: The Reverend Doctor

Gerhard Wehmeier (1935–2009) was an Old Testament Scholar hailing from Germany from the Evangelical Church of Hesse Electorate-Waldeck. Wehmeier taught Old Testament at the United Theological College, Bangalore from 1973 through 1978.

== Studies ==
Wehmeier studied at the seminary in Bielefeld-Bethel and later at the Universities in Göttingen, Basel, Bonn and Atlanta in North America.

== Writings ==
- 1970, Der Segen im Alten Testament: eine semasiologische Untersuchung der Wurzel brk,
- 1974, The Theme Blessing for the Nations in the Promises to the Patriarchs and in the Prophetical Literature,
- 1977, The Prohibition of Theft in the Decalogue,

== Teaching ==
Wehmeier began teaching Old Testament at the United Theological College, Bangalore from 1973 during the Principalship of J. R. Chandran. Wehmeier's students who specialized in Old Testament during that period include,

- 1972–1974, S. J. Theodore of the Church of South India, Diocese of Karimnagar,
- 1972–1975, Nitoy Achümi of the Bible Society of India,
- 1975–1977, R. Daniel Premkumar of the Church of South India Synod,
- 1976–1978, D. Dhanaraj of the Karnataka Theological College,
- 1977–1979, J. Bhaskar Jeyaraj of the South Asia Institute of Advanced Christian Studies.

When Wehmeier joined the seminary in 1973, John Sadananda, the present Master of the Senate of Serampore College (University) was still a graduate student who benefited from the Old Testament scholarship of Wehmeier and his other two colleagues, G. M. Butterworth and E. C. John and the three of them led the Old Testament studies in Bangalore while John D. W. Watts and G. Babu Rao led the Old Testament studies in Serampore College, Serampore for nearly half a decade.

After Wehmeier returned to Germany in 1978 to take up responsibilities with his home Church, the Evangelical Church of Hesse Electorate-Waldeck, he continued to be involved in matters relating to ministerial support for students pursuing seminary studies in India. It was Wehmeier who made possible the overseas research studies of Daniel Sadananda, a New Testament Scholar and current President of the United Theological College, Bangalore Society.

== Reminisce ==
Bishop de:Martin Hein, EKD,

...a purposeful working member of the Church who had never wanted to focus on his person, but had always given priority to the service of the Gospel and the Church. He deserves special recognition for the theological training and the service in the Church as Pastor of the pastors. Wehmeier showed himself as an ecumenical Christian with a comprehensive horizon through his work in India and the United States.

Academic offices
Preceded by G. M. Butterworth	Teacher – in – Old Testament; United Theological College, Bangalore; 1973–1978	Succeeded by Theodore N. Swanson
