= John Sadananda =

Indian Anglican bishop (born 1949)

Bishop Emeritus John S. Sadananda, CSI Dr. Theol. (Göttingen)
- Bishop Emeritus in Karnataka Southern Diocese of Church of South India
- Church: Church of South India (A Uniting church comprising Wesleyan Methodist, Congregational, Lutheran, Calvinist and Anglican missionary societies – SPG, WMMS, LMS, Basel Mission, CMS, and the Church of England)
- Diocese: Karnataka Southern Diocese
- Elected: 2009
- In office: 2009-2013
- Predecessor: Devaraj Bangera
- Successor: Mohan Manoraj
- Previous posts: Pastor, Basel Evangelical Mission /Church of South India (1969–1974), Teacher/Principal, Karnataka Theological College, Mangalore (1974/1992-2009), Bishop - in - Karnataka Southern Diocese of Church of South India, Mangalore (2009-2013)

Orders
- Ordination: 1969 as Deacon and 1975 as Presbyter by S. R. Furtado
- Consecration: 28 August 2009 by J. W. Gladstone, Moderator and Christopher Asir, Deputy Moderator, Church of South India Synod
- Rank: Bishop

Personal details
- Born: John Stephen Sadananda; 24 September 1949 (age 76) Karnataka
- Denomination: Christianity
- Residence: Mangalore, Karnataka (India)
- Parents: Smt. Salome and Sri Daniel Sadananda
- Occupation: Pastor
- Education: L. Th. (Serampore), B. D. (Serampore), M. A. (Mysore), Dr. Theol. (Göttingen)
- Alma mater: Karnataka Theological College, Mangalore (India), United Theological College, Bangalore (India), University of Mysore, Mysore (India), University of Göttingen, Göttingen (Germany)

Bishop Emeritus John S. Sadananda (born 24 September 1949) was the Master of Serampore College (University), the nation's first University) with degree-granting authority validated by a Danish Charter and ratified by the Government of West Bengal.

Sadananda was appointed as the Master of the University in 2010. As an academic, Sadananda had been a Senator of the University from 1993 onwards since the time he was appointed as Principal of the Karnataka Theological College which has been an affiliated institution of the University. From 2006 to 2011, Sadananda had been President of the University.

In ecclesiastical matters, Sadananda was the fifth Bishop in Karnataka Southern Diocese of the Church of South India occupying the Cathedra placed in CSI-Shanthi Cathedral, Mangalore from 2009 to 2013.

== Studies ==
=== Licentiate ===
Sadananda underwent ministerial formation as a candidate of the Basel Evangelical Mission at the Karnataka Theological College, Mangalore, affiliated to the nation's first University in 1965, the very year of the formation of the institution under the Principalship of Robert Scheuermeier taking a Licentiate in Theology in 1968 awarded by the Serampore College (University) led by its Registrar, C. Devasahayam. After a one-year ministerial period, he was ordained as a Deacon in 1969 by which time the Basel Evangelical Mission unionized itself into the Church of South India due to which Sadananda became a Deacon of the Church of South India under which he continued his ministry in the Diocese.

=== Graduate ===
In order to upgrade his academics, Sadananda joined the United Theological College, Bangalore in 1972 where he studied up to 1974 taking a Bachelor of Divinity under the Principalship of Joshua Russell Chandran. During his two-year period at the Seminary in Bangalore, although a graduate student, Sadananda evinced keen interest in the Sacred Scriptures and the ancient Biblical languages which caught the attention of the Old Testament Scholar, E. C. John as well as the postgraduate students specialising in Old Testament, G. Solomon, A. P. Chacko, Basil Rebera, G. Babu Rao, Nitoy Achümi, S. J. Theodore, and Timotheas Hembrom. As part of the University requirements, Sadananda wrote his graduate thesis drawing parallels between the Book of Proverbs and the proverbial collections in Kannada which the Old Testament Teacher G. Babu Rao highlighted in one of his works.

Sadananda's graduate companions included Sydney Salins, Christopher Asir, P. Surya Prakash, D. Dhanaraj and others. During the final year of his study in Bangalore, the Old Testament Scholar, Gerhard Wehmeier joined the College enriching the interest in Old Testament studies and Sadananda submitted a thesis entitled A Comparative Study of the Form and Content of the Book of Proverbs and of Sarvajna Vachanagalu done under the supervision of the Old Testament Scholar G. M. Butterworth. The University awarded a degree at its Convocation held on 1 February 1975 at the Serampore College, Serampore where incidentally the Commemoration Mass was conducted by G. Babu Rao of Serampore College at the CNI-St. Olave's Church, Serampore.

=== Postgraduate ===
Sadananda also pursued a postgraduate degree from the University of Mysore taking a Master of Arts in Kannada.

=== Research studies ===
Sadananda enrolled at the Goethe Institute, Pune during 1977/1978 for language proficiency courses in German after which he proceeded to Germany in 1978 for an integral course leading to Doctor of Theology specializing in Old Testament with his B.D. degree from the Serampore College (University) which is considered by the German universities for entry into doctoral programmes. Sadananda researched for 5 years at the University under Professors Hans-Joachim Kraus and R. Smend. In 1983, Sadananda was able to complete his doctoral dissertation entitled Revelation in the Psalms and submitted it to the University which awarded a Doctor of Theology degree which was later published by the University of Göttingen in October 1983.

During Sadananda's study period in Germany (1978–1983), he was joined by his senior from his seminary days in Bangalore, J. W. Gladstone who enrolled at the University of Hamburg in 1978 for pursuing doctoral studies in Church History. A year later, they were joined by D. Dhanaraj, who happened to be Sadananda's graduate companion, who enrolled at the University of Hamburg in 1979 to pursue doctoral studies in Old Testament. Two years later in 1982, they were joined by G. Babu Rao, their postgraduate companion during their seminary days' in Bangalore, who came for a 2½ year study period to the University of Hamburg. While Gladstone, Dhanaraj and Babu Rao were in Hamburg in the northern part of Germany, Sadananda was at Göttingen in the central part but was able to meet G. Babu Rao during the biannual Kirchentag that took place at Hannover in 1983.

== Ecclesiastical career ==
=== Pastoral ministry ===
From 1968 to 1970, Sadananda pastored parishes of the erstwhile Basel Evangelical Mission which already joined the newly trifurcated Diocese of Mysore. Due to the ecclesiastical jurisdiction, Sadananda was allotted the Karnataka Southern Diocese led by its Bishop S. R. Furtado. Again from 1974 to 1978, he pastored CSI-St. Paul’s Church, Mangalore.

=== Teaching ministry ===
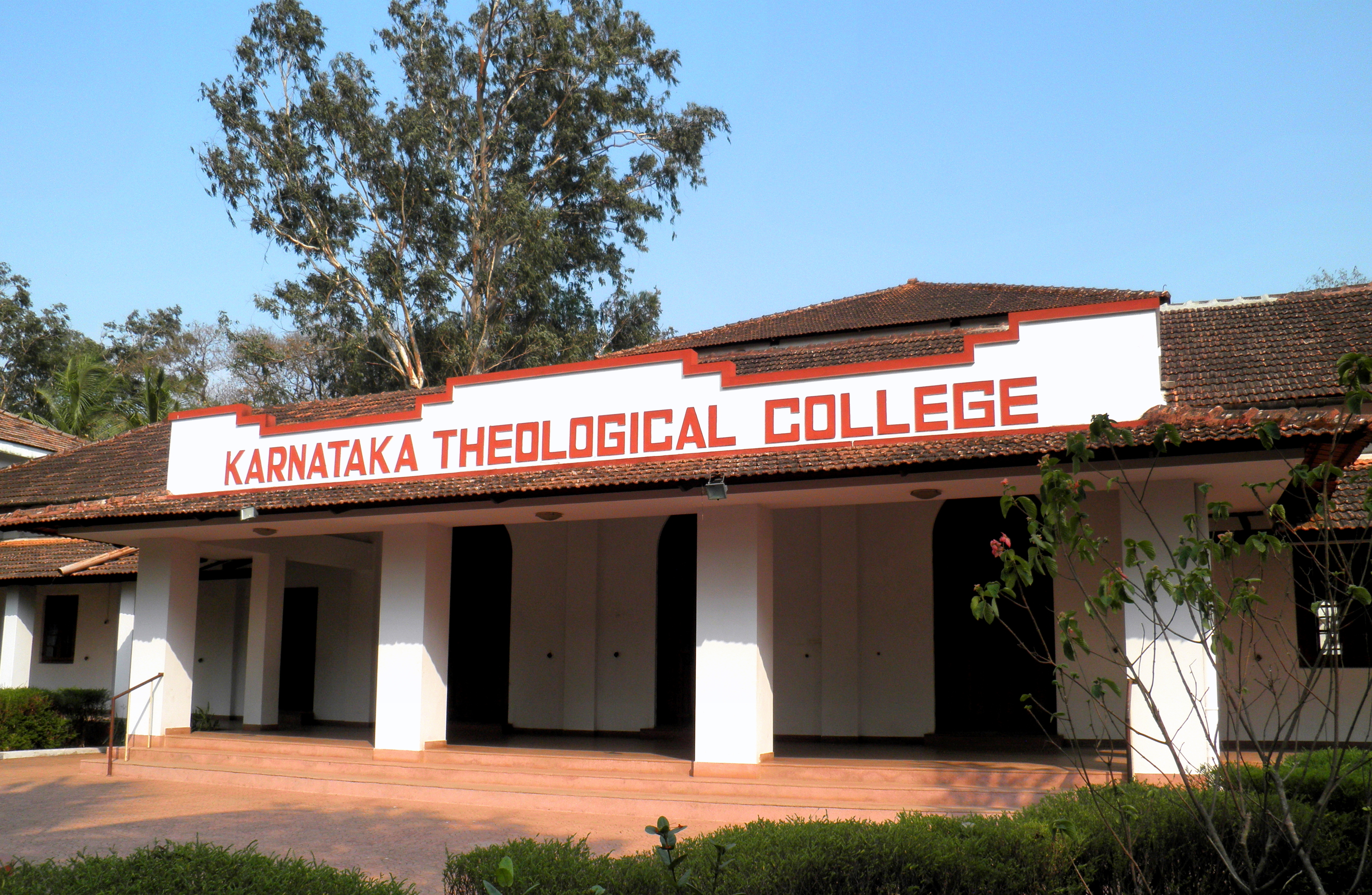
Karnataka Theological College, Mangalore - Sadananda was an alma mater of this institution and also taught for more than three decades.

Ever since Sadananda's completion of graduate studies at the Protestant Regional Seminary in Bangalore in 1974, he began teaching at the Protestant Seminary in Mangalore led by Principal C. D. Jathanna both of whom taught Old Testament for successive batches of students undergoing ministerial formation at the Seminary. After a period of study leave (1978-1983), Sadananda returned to Mangalore and taught along with D. Dhanaraj. While this was so, Sadananda's postgraduate companion, G. Babu Rao, first taught Old Testament at Serampore College, Serampore and later moved to the Protestant Regional Theologiate in Hyderabad while J. W. Gladstone, his senior, taught Church History at the Kerala United Theological Seminary in Trivandrum.

In 1992, Sadananda was made Principal of the College and led the Protestant Seminary in a responsible manner and represented it at the Serampore College (University) as an Invitee on ex officio basis. In 2009, after teaching for nearly 35 years (1974–2009), Sadananda gave up his teaching and administrative responsibilities at the seminary as he was elected to the bishopric.

=== Bishopric ===
In 2009, the Church of South India Synod declared Sadananda as the fifth Bishop-elect leading to Sadananda's consecration at the CSI-Shanthi Cathedral on 28 August 2009 in Mangalore by the Principal Consecrator, J. W. Gladstone, Moderator and Christopher Asir, Deputy Moderator of the Church of South India Synod in the presence of other clergy. After a 5-year bishopric, Sadananda vacated the Cathedra on attaining superannuation resulting in sede vacante which was filled with the consecration of Mohan Manoraj.

== Honorary commitments ==
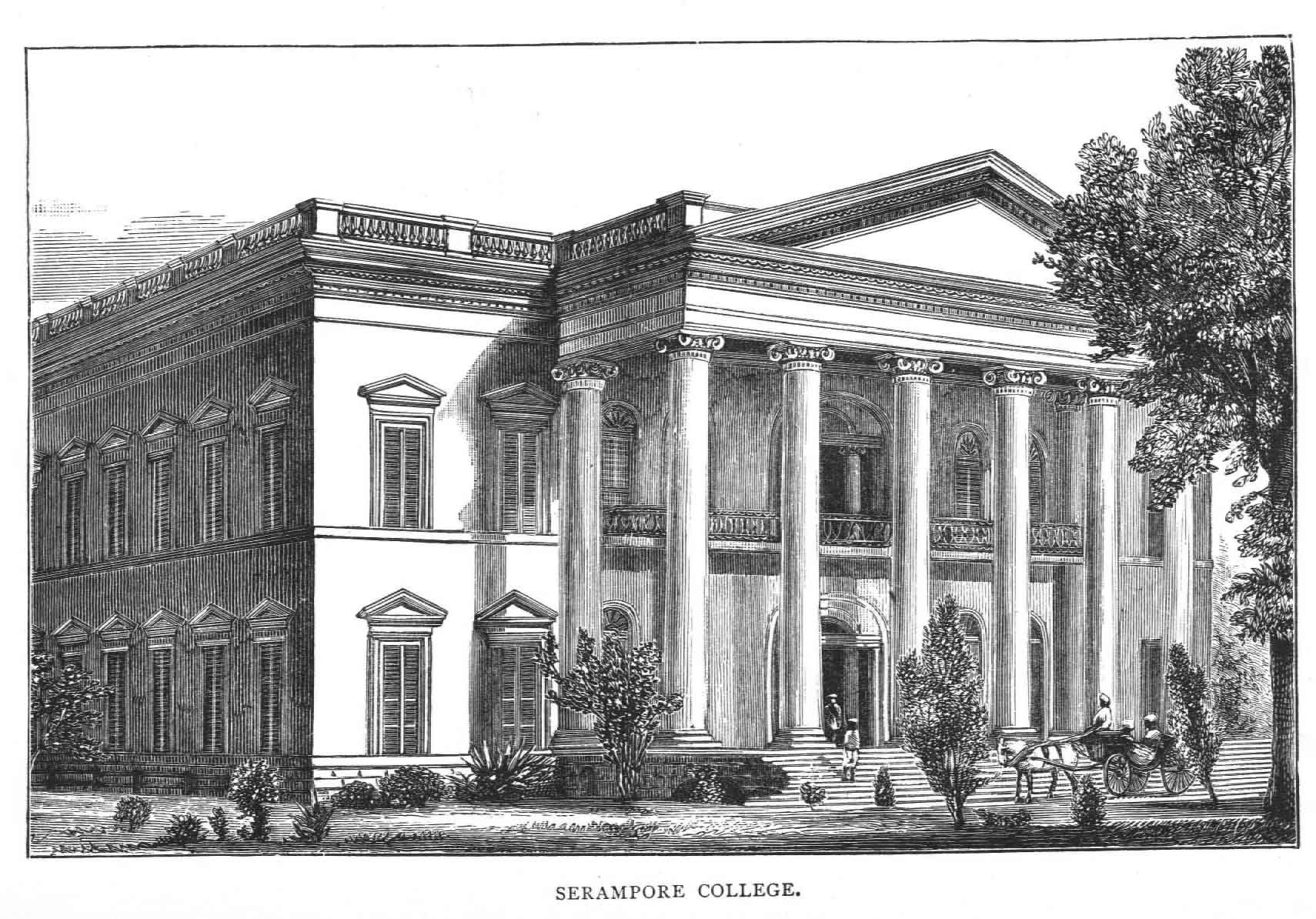
Serampore College (University), Serampore where Sadananda has associated himself for the cause of Spiritual formation for nearly twenty five years.

=== Senate ===
Since 1993, Sadananda has been a Senator of the Serampore College (University) right until 2010, a record 18-year period during which he was involved in academic commitments within the University. He held many responsibilities at the University, especially during the Registrarship of D. S. Satyaranjan which later continued with successive Registrars who were at the helm,

- 1993-2010, Senator, Serampore College (University),
- 1994-2005, Secretary, Board of Theological Education of the Senate of Serampore College,
- 2005-2010, President, Board of Theological Education of the Senate of Serampore College,
- 2005-2010, President, Serampore College (University),

=== Other institutions ===
Sadananda also served in other ecclesiastical institutions,

- Ecumenical Christian Centre, Bangalore, as Chairperson from 2005 through 2009,
- Inter-Church Service Association, Chennai, as Chairperson,

== Writings ==
- 1974, A Comparative Study of the Form and Content of the Book of Proverbs and of Sarvajna Vachanagalu,
- 1983, Revelation in the Psalms,
- 1985, The Concept of Partnership: A response to Rev. Robert Scheuermeier,
- 1989, Theology by the People - An Old Testament Perspective,
- 2001, Equipping the People of God,
- 2006, Mission perspectives and Search for an Ecclesiology,
- 2006, Peace and justice-commitment for Sahodaya and Sarvodaya,

== Honours ==
In 2015, the Board of Theological Education of the Senate of Serampore College published a festschrift in honour of Sadananda edited by Wati Longchar and P. Mohan Larbeer with essays written by friends and colleagues of Sadananda.

Religious titles
Preceded by Devaraj Bangera; 2004-2009	CSI Bishop - in - Karnataka Southern Diocese, Mangalore; 2009 -2013	Succeeded by Mohan Manoraj; 2014-
Academic offices
Preceded by C. L. Furtado; 1983 - 1992	Principal, Karnataka Theological College, Mangalore; 1992 - 2009	Succeeded by H. R. Cabral; 2009-
Preceded by C. D. Jathanna; 1965 - 1983	Teacher - in - Old Testament, Karnataka Theological College, Mangalore; 1974 - 2009	Succeeded by D. Dhanaraj; 1978 - 2015
Educational offices
Preceded by J. W. Gladstone; 2000 - 2005	President; Serampore College (University), Serampore; 2006 - 2011	Succeeded by Issac Mar Philoxenos Episcopa; 2011 - 2017
Honorary titles
Preceded by Hilda Peacock; 2010	Master; Serampore College (University), Serampore; 2010-2019	Succeeded by Anilkumar John Servand
