= Daniel Sadananda =

Daniel Rathnakara Sadananda
- Born: Daniel Rathnakara Sadananda; Karnataka, India
- Occupation: Theologian
- Parent(s): Smt. Jessie Jemima and James Lawrence Sadananda
- Writings: 1990, Sacramentalism in the Fourth Gospel: An exploration into the sacramental concern of the Fourth Evangelist; 2004, The Johannine Exegesis of God: An Exploration Into the Johannine understanding of God; 2014, Contribution of Basel Missionaries to Medical and Educational Field
- Congregations served: Church of South India Karnataka Southern Diocese
- Offices held: Pastor, Karnataka Southern Diocese, Church of South India, -1986, Teacher, Karnataka Theological College, Mangalore, 1990-Present
- Title: The Reverend Doctor

Daniel Rathnakara Sadananda is a New Testament Scholar who is re-elected as the General Secretary (Triennium 2017-2020) of the Church of South India Synod headquartered in Chennai as well as the Chairperson (triennium 2015-2018) of the Council of the United Theological College, Bangalore, the only autonomous College under the Senate of Serampore College (University). He also serves as the Vice President of National Council of Churches in India (2016-2020) as well Executive Secretary of the Communion of Churches in India comprising CNI, CSI, Marthoma Churches and now MCI.

In terms of scholarship, Sadananda is an authority on Johannine theology and has also contributed the history of the Basel Evangelical Mission by initiating research into Moegling's encyclopedia, Bibliotheca Carnatica and Ferdinand Kittel's complete works.

== Studies ==
=== Post-graduate ===
After ministerial formation at the Karnataka Theological College, Mangalore, Sadananda was ordained as Deacon in 1986, and as Presbyter in 1989. Sadananda studied at the United Theological College, Bangalore where he enrolled for a postgraduate programme, Master of Theology, specializing in New Testament under Professor Dr. M. V. Abraham between 1988-1990. Sadananda's companions during his study years at Bangalore comprised B. D. Prasad Rao, H. R. Cabral and Jonadob Nathaniel, the present Director Translations of the Bible Society of India. Sadananda's postgraduate thesis was entitled Sacramentalism in the Fourth Gospel: An exploration into the sacramental concern of the Fourth Evangelist done under Professor M. V. Abraham for which he was awarded a Master of Theology (M. Th.) degree by the university under the Registrarship of D. S. Satyaranjan.

=== Research studies ===
For doctoral studies, Sadananda was able to enroll at the Kirchliche Hochschule, Bethel, Bielefeld in Germany with the help of Gerhard Wehmeier of the Evangelical Church of Hesse Electorate-Waldeck who introduced him to Professor Andreas Lindemann of the Kirchliche Hochschule, Bethel, Bielefeld where Sadananda then began researching under Professor Andreas Lindemann with the title The Johannine Exegesis of God: An Exploration Into the Johannine understanding of God, which was co-moderated by Professor François Vouga. Subsequently, Sadananda's work was published in 2004 by a publisher in Germany.

== Ecclesiastical ministry ==
=== Teacher ===
Since 1990, Sadananda began teaching at the Seminary established in 1847 by the Basel Evangelical Mission Society, which later became Karnataka Theological College, Mangalore, 1965 and affiliated to the nation's first University, the Senate of Serampore College (University).

In 1997 August on completion of his doctoral studies, he joined KTC faculty and in 2002 August he was promoted as Professor of New Testament.

He was a visiting Professor and researcher at Phillip’s University, Marburg, Germany, 2007 April – 2008 May

He also delivered guest lectures at Stellenbosch University, Cape town, South Africa, in August 2001; Immanuel College, Toronto, Canada, in July 2003 University of Augsburg, Germany, in October 2004 and April; Augustana Forum, Augsburg, Germany, in April 2008, Hofgeismar Predigerseminar and Evangelische Akademi, Germany (EKD), in May 2008; Kirchliche Hochschule, Bethel, Bielefeld, Germany – In honour of Prof. Andreas Lindemann on his 65th birthday, in October 2008.

=== Administrator ===
Sadananda was the first Kannadiga to have been elected as the General Secretary in the history of the Church of South India during the 34th Synod of the Church of South India held in Vijayawada in January 2014 which also saw the election of Govada Dyvasirvadam as the Moderator and Thomas K. Oommen as the Deputy Moderator.

Sadananda has served as the director, Karnataka Theological Research Institute (KATHRI – affiliated to Kannada University for M.Phil. and Ph.D.) 2008-2014 and as the treasurer, Karnataka Christian Educational Society, Mangalore, 2010-2014.

He also served as director of 'Sahodaya' - Programme Centre of the KTC Mangalore, 2003–2010; as director, Department of Theological Studies by Extension at KTC, 1999–2007 which Offers Bachelor of Christian Studies (BCS), Diploma in Christian Studies (Dip.C.S.) and Certificate in Theology (C.Th.) for laity.

=== Honorary initiatives ===
As an ecclesiastical figure, Sadananda was a member of the Dialogue Commission between the Vatican and the World Alliance of Reformed Churches He attended Commission meetings and presented papers at Amsterdam, Netherlands 1999, Rome, Italy 2000, Cape Town, South Africa 2001, Belfast, Northern Ireland 2002, Toronto, Canada 2003, Venice, Italy 2004. 2000 August - Audience and consultation with Pope John Paul II as part of the WARC-RC Dialogue Commission in Vatican and is also a member of the theological Network of the World Communion of Reformed Churches.

Sadananda is also the honorary executive secretary of the Communion of Churches in India, an ecclesial communion of the Church of North India, Church of South India and Mar Thoma Church.

In August 2015, the Council of the United Theological College, Bangalore elected Sadananda as the chairperson of the College Society for the triennium 2015-2018 succeeding G. Devakadasham, the outgoing chairperson.

In April 2016 Sadananda was elected vice president of National Council of Churches in India, at the Jabalpur Assembly, for the quadrennial 2016-2020.

In September 2017 Sadananda was elected as vice president of Christian Institute of Religion and Society, Bangalore. In December 2017 Sadananda was elected to the Senate of Serampore College, as senator, to serve the Senate of Serampore College as it enters its centenary year and Serampore College its bicentenary year.

In 2012 January, Sadananda was invited as Bible study leader at the XXXIII Session of the CSI Synod held at Kanyakumari and conducted two Bible studies on "That in God's hands they may be One" and "That they all may be One as We are One".

Between 2000-2006, 2010-12 he served as the convenor, CSI Liturgy Commission (Four terms) and oversaw the process of revision, editing, printing and publishing of the CSI Book of Common Worship - first-ever revision of the CSI Liturgy after the Book of Common Worship which was adopted shortly after the formation of CSI in 1947. The revision process took six years of intense and committed hard work. The Revised Book of Common Worship was accepted and authorised for general use in the CSI during Synod Session at Bangalore 2004. Officially released at the Synod Session at Mysore 2006.

Sadananda has also served as Member, Communion of Churches in India (CSI-CNI-Mar Thoma Church) Worship and Mission Commission2000-2004; and Member, CCI Lectionary Committee, involved in the revision of the CCI Common lectionary, 2012-2014.

Since June 2010, he is also the Honorary Correspondent of CSI-KASDES Kittel Memorial Pre-university College, Mangalore, CSI-KASDES Kittel Memorial High School, Mangalore and CSI-KASDES UBMC Higher Primary School, Gorigudda, Mangalore of which he is an alumnus.

Academic offices
Preceded by Sydney Salins; 1974-2015	Teacher-in-New Testament; Karnataka Theological College, Mangalore; 1990-	Succeeded by 'Incumbent'
Religious titles
Preceded by M. M. Philip; 2010-2014	General Secretary, Church of South India Synod, Chennai; 2014-2017, 2017-2020	Succeeded by Incumbent
Honorary titles
Preceded by G. Devakadasham; 2012-2015	Chairperson, Council of the United Theological College, Bangalore; 2015-2018	Succeeded by Incumbent
