= Eric J. Lott =

English religious scholar (born 1934)

- Born: 27 May 1934; North Devon, England
- Other names: Guruji
- Education: Richmond Adult Community College, Richmond; King's College, London (BD); University of Lancaster, Lancaster (M.Litt.) and (PhD)
- Church: Methodist
- Ordained: 1961
- Writings: See list
- Congregations served: The Melton Mowbray Methodist Circuit
- Offices held: Professor of Religions
- Title: Reverend Doctor

Eric J. Lott (born 27 May 1934 in North Devon, England) is a religious scholar who taught in Andhra Pradesh and Karnataka. Of the Indian languages, he knew Sanskrit, Telugu and Kannada.

== Background ==
After theological studies at Richmond Methodist Theological College, he joined a graduate course in divinity at King's College, London and earned a B. D. degree in 1959.

The Wesleyan Methodist Missionary Society designated Lott as a missionary to India and sent him in 1959 to minister in the Diocese of Dornakal of the Church of South India.

Lott was ordained in 1962 in the Cathedral of the Epiphany in Dornakal during the Bishopric of P. Solomon, as a Presbyter of the Church of South India.

== Contribution ==
=== Andhra Pradesh ===
Lott first taught at the Andhra Union Theological College, Dornakal from 1962 to 1964 along with Victor Premasagar, then Lecturer of Old Testament. The Principal of the College in Dornakal at that time was C. S. Sundaresan and the College was affiliated to the Senate of Serampore College.

With the 1964 merger of the College in Dornakal into the newly formed ecumenical Andhra Christian Theological College in Rajahmundry, then headed by W. D. Coleman, Lott began taking classes in the river town of Rajahmundry. Later in 1972, Lott moved to Hyderabad along with the College when it was relocated to Hyderabad.

During Lott's teaching career in Andhra Pradesh from 1962 to 1976, Lott taught New Testament and Religions to students pursuing L.Th., B.Th., and BD in Dornakal, Rajahmundry, and Hyderabad.

In 1973, the Andhra Christian Theological College released Service for All Seasons, Lott's ecumenical worship book, which continues to be the primary worship book for students of Baptist, Lutheran, Anglican, Pentecostal, and Methodist backgrounds studying theology at the seminary in Hyderabad. The book was also adopted in a Church setting by the United Church in Defence Colony in Sainikpuri, Hyderabad, which serves an ecumenical congregation.

=== Karnataka ===
From 1977, Lott began teaching Religions at the United Theological College, Bengaluru along with G. D. Melanchthon, then Professor of Religions. The college enjoyed autonomous status with the Senate of Serampore College. Lott mentored students pursuing theology who came from diverse backgrounds. During the late 1970s during the Principalship of Joshua Russell Chandran, Lott encountered a student who would not complete his M.Th. thesis in Religions. The student's thesis was on self-proclaimed avatar Sai Baba; when Lott offered revision suggestions, the student balked, since he believed that the "spirit of Sathya Sai Baba" had already taken control of the thesis and it could not be revised, lest the spirit got disturbed.

== Higher studies ==
While teaching at Rajahmundry, Lott took study leave for the academic year 1969–1970 and completed postgraduate studies (M.Litt.) at the University of Lancaster in England. His dissertation was later published under the title God and the Universe in the Vedāntic Theology of Rāmānuja.

In 1975, Lott again went on study leave to the University of Lancaster to pursue doctoral studies. His 1977 doctoral dissertation was entitled Vedāntic approaches to God.

== Writings ==
- 1973 – Service for All Seasons
- 1975 – India's Religions (in Telugu)
- 1976 – God and the Universe in the Vedāntic Theology of Rāmānuja: A Study in his Use of the Self-body Analogy
- 1980 – Vedāntic Approaches to God
- 1986 – Worship in an Indian Context: Eight Intercultural Liturgies
- 1988 – Vision, Tradition & Interpretation: Theology, Religion & Religious Studies
- 1998 – Healing Wings: Acts of Jesus for Human Wholeness
- 2005 – Religious Faith, Human Identity: Dangerous Dynamics in Indian & Global Life
- 2008 – Faces of Vision: Images of Life and Faith (with Jyoti Sahi)

== Ornithology ==
An amateur ornithologist, Lott contributed to knowledge on several Indian bird species through his observations and writings, which include:

- "On the Occurrence of White-naped Tit Parus nuchalis in Southern India"
- The Birds of the Cauvery Valley

== Honours ==
In 1985 the Indian Institute of World Culture, Bengaluru, invited Lott to deliver the Justice B. Vasudevamurthy Memorial Lecture.

In 1996 David C. Scott and Israel Selvanayagam brought out a festschrift published for the United Theological College and entitled Re-Visioning India's Religious Traditions in Lott's honour on his turning 60.

In 1998 and 2000 Lott delivered the Cambridge Teape Lectures in Cambridge and India respectively.

== Retirement ==
Lott retired on health grounds in 1988 from the United Theological College. From 1989 he began pastoral work in the inner city community of Leicester in England.

== Reminisce ==
Talathoti Punnaiah who studied a 3-year theology course leading to Bachelor of Theology at the Andhra Christian Theological College, both at Rajahmundry and at Hyderabad from 1970-1973 recalls his association with Lott,

Lott was from England who learnt Telugu and Sanskrit languages and taught us the life of Christ and Hinduism very well. I used to ask him several questions in the class and he used to patiently give answers to me. During a year he was our Faculty Leader and took us all to Khammam for preaching tour. He was a very good teacher and preacher. He was a melodious singer. He was an inspiration to all of us.

Academic offices
Preceded by G. D. Melanchthon	Professor of Religions; United Theological College, Bengaluru; 1977–1988	Succeeded by David C. Scott
Preceded by New position	Professor; Andhra Christian Theological College, Hyderabad; 1964–1976	Succeeded by R. R. Sundara Rao
Preceded by	Professor; Andhra Union Theological College, Dornakal; 1962–1964	Succeeded by
