= Hannibal Richard Cabral =

The Reverend Doctor H. R. Cabral, CSI
- Born: Hannibal Richard Cabral; June 25, 1955; Mangalore, Madras State
- Died: October 23, 2021 (aged 66); Mangalore, Karnataka
- Burial place: Mangalore, Karnataka
- Other names: Honey Cabral
- Education: B. Th., B. D., M. Th., D.Th. (Serampore), Th.M. (Princeton)
- Alma mater: Karnataka Theological College, Mangalore; United Theological College, Bangalore; Princeton Theological Seminary, Pasadena; South Asia Theological Research Institute, Bangalore
- Occupations: Theologian, educator, communication specialist, dramatist
- Years active: 1976-2021 (45 years)
- Known for: Composing over 500+ songs in Kannada and Tulu
- Parent(s): Smt. Manorama and Sri Percy Cabral
- Religion: Christianity
- Church: Church of South India (A Uniting church comprising Wesleyan Methodist, Anglican, Presbyterian, Congregational and Calvinist Church Societies)
- Ordained: 1976 as Deacon; 1980 as Presbyter
- Writings: See section
- Congregations served: Tarikere (1976-1977), Boston (1996-1997), North Wildwood, New Jersey (2007-2008), Mangalore (1976-2021)
- Offices held: Principal, Karnataka Theological College, Mangalore (2009-2020); Secretary, Karnataka Christian Education Society (2009-2020); Chairperson, Karnataka Theological Research Institute (2009-2020); Patron, Indian Red Cross Society, Dakshina Kannada District branch
- Title: The Reverend Doctor

Hannibal Richard Cabral (25 June 1955 — 23 October 2021) was the former principal of Karnataka Theological College, Mangalore, a seminary established in 1965 and affiliated to India's first University, the Senate of Serampore College. Cabral was appointed by the College Council as Principal in 2009.

== Studies ==
Cabral had his spiritual formation at the Karnataka Theological College, Mangalore, when he enrolled for a graduate course in 1971, receiving a Bachelor of Theology degree and later was upgraded to a Bachelor of Divinity degree at the Karnataka Theological College during the principalship of C. D. Jathanna. Cabral took postgraduate studies at United Theological College, Bangalore during the years 1988-1990 and worked out a dissertation entitled An evaluation of the effectiveness of selected Christian dramas in Kannada in communication of the Gospel during the Principalship of Gnana Robinson leading to the award of Master of Theology. Cabral also studied at the Princeton Theological Seminary for a year in 1993.

Continuing his studies, Cabral enrolled for doctoral studies at the South Asia Theological Research Institute, Bangalore and on successful submission of his dissertation, he was awarded a Doctor of Theology degree by the Senate of Serampore College in 1998. Cabral pursued all his theological degrees from the University, with the exception of a postgraduation course from Princeton, and was awarded degrees in successive Convocations by the Senate of Serampore College (University).

== Initiatives ==
In 2010, Karnataka Theological College, under the Principalship of Cabral, announced the start of a two-year postgraduate programme leading to the award of Master of Arts in association with the George August University of Göttingen.

== Writings ==
- Cabral, Honey (2006). "Missionaries and Carnatic Music". In Wendt, Reinhard (ed.). An Indian to the Indians?: On the Initial Failure and the Posthumous Success of the Missionary Ferdinand Kittel (1832-1903). Otto Harrossowitz Verlag. pp. 255–264.
- Cabral, Honey (2001). "The Role of Music in Religious Communication: Implications for a Theological Curriculum". In Traber, Michael (ed.). Communication in Theological Education: New Directions. ISPCK. pp. 163–174.
- Cabral, Honey (2003). "Secularism in the Context of Religious Plurality". Religion and Society. 48 (1): 67–77.
- Cabral, Honey (1991). An evaluation of the effectiveness of selected Christian dramas in Kannada in communication of the Gospel (M.Th. thesis). Serampore University.

Christian Hymns in vernacular languages were composed and sung to Indian classical music by the early Missionaries and the early Christians in India. P. Solomon Raj in the context of the Christian Hymnal in Telugu writes that it has been of high literary standard consisting of hymns in Telugu set in music patterns of Carnatic music and Hindustani classical music. Similarly, in 2000, Roger E. Hedlund (who taught at the Serampore College and is the Editor of the missiological journal, Dharma Deepika), the missiologist wrote that, along with the Bible, the Christian Hymnal in Telugu also formed the main bulwark of Christian spiritual life for the Telugu folk and of equal use to both the non-literates and the literates as well. Cabral in his article Missionaries and Carnatic Music wrote that the early missionaries with special reference to Ferdinand Kittel were bemused by the Hindustani classical music and began composing songs in the local tradition.

== Lyricist ==
Cabral composed more than 500 songs in Kannada, English, Tulu and Hindi and had a stint at radio with the State-run All India Radio and the Far East Broadcasting Associates.

Academic offices
Preceded by John S. Sadananda; 1991-2009	Principal, Karnataka Theological College, Mangalore; 2009-2020	Succeeded by Hubert Manohar Watson
