= H. S. Wilson =

Henry Steward Wilson
- Born: 1946; Karnataka, India
- Occupation: Theologian

Ecclesiastical career
- Church: Church of South India Karnataka Southern Diocese
- Ordained: 19 November 1978 at CSI-St. Paul’s Church, Mangalore by S. R. Furtado
- Offices held: Pastor, Church of South India (1973-1979); Professor, United Theological College, Bangalore (1978-1988); Director, Ecumenical Relations Department, Church of South India Synod(1988-1989); Executive Secretary, Department of Theology, World Alliance of Reformed Churches, Geneva(1989-1998); Director, Center for Global Theologies, Wartburg Theological Seminary (2000-2003); Director, Multicultural Mission Resource Center, Lutheran Theological Seminary at Philadelphia(2003-2006); Adjunct Professor, Lutheran Theological Seminary at Philadelphia(2007-); Guest Professor, Karnataka Theological College, Mangalore (2007-)
- Title: The Reverend Doctor

H. S. Wilson (born 1946) is the Executive Director of Foundation for Theological Education in the Southeast Asia based in Philadelphia. Wilson is widely known in India for his contribution to theological education as the Director (1980 through 1988) of Research and Church Relations at the Board of Theological Education of the Senate of Serampore College, Bangalore, the theological arm of the Senate of Serampore College (University), the nation's first University

== Studies ==
Wilson studied at St. Aloysius College (Mangalore), obtaining a degree in Commerce (B. Com.) from the University of Mysore. He had his ministerial formation at the United Theological College, Bangalore as a candidate of the United Basel Mission between 1967–1970 where he obtained a Bachelor of Divinity (B. D.) entitling his graduate thesis as An Impact of Protestant Christianity of the Religious, Social, and Cultural Aspect of Tuluva Community in South Kanara. Later, the University, under the Registrarship of Chetti Devasahayam, awarded him a degree.

From 1970 to 1972, he pursued a Master of Arts (M.A.) degree from Karnataka University. Afterwards, he went over to Princeton, New Jersey to study for a postgraduate degree in Theology, where he took a Master of Theology (Th.M.) degree from the Princeton Theological Seminary. He then continued his studies up to research level by enrolling at the Drew University, obtaining a Doctor of Philosophy (Ph.D.) degree in 1977. There, he submitted a thesis entitled The Speaking God: Luther's Theology of Preaching done under the guidance of Professors Bard Thompson, James Pain and Charles L. Rice.

== Writings ==
=== Books ===
- 1977, The Speaking God: Luther's Theology of Preaching.
- 1988 (Edited), The Church on the Move: A Quest to Affirm the Biblical Faith - Essays in honour of P. Victor Premasagar
- 1990 (Edited), Moving Communities in Mission: Consultation on Vision for Equipping the Local Congregations in Mission
- 1996 (Edited), Pastoral Theology from a Global Perspective: A Case Study Approach

=== Articles ===
- 1986, Involvement of the Wesleyan Kanarese Mission in the Mysore Territory in the Nineteenth Century,
- 1989, The Puebla document and the Church's commitment to the poor and the oppressed,
- 1989, Bible as People's Book: Experiences of the Basic Christian Communities,
- 2000, Need to forgive for a new relationship: A relevant 'Crucipraxis' for today
- 2004, Distance Education: A Challenge to Theological Education,
- 2005, Luther on Preaching as God Speaking,
- 2006, Role of the Theological Educator in a Multicultural Context
- 2015, Transcending exclusive claims about God: A plea to pursue binding relations among the followers of Abrahamic faith heritage.

== Ecclesiastical career ==
=== Pastoral ministry ===
As a ministerial candidate of the United Basel Mission, Wilson pastored at the United Basel Mission Church in Mumbai from 1973–1974. During his overseas study, he was Youth Pastor at the Arcola Methodist Church, New Jersey. From 1978-1979, he was Honorary Associate Presbyter at CSI-St. Andrew's Church, Bangalore.

Although Wilson belonged to the Basel Mission which had unionized itself into the Church of South India in 1968, he continued to be in the fold of the United Basel Mission. The ecclesiastical unification of the erstwhile Basel Mission did not go well with the congregations resulting in undecided allegiance, an act which resulted in chaos due to poor management. Wilson took some time to decide his allegiance and eventually came into the fold of the Church of South India resulting in his ordination on 19 November 1978 at CSI-St. Paul’s Church, Mangalore by S. R. Furtado then Bishop - in - Karnataka Southern Diocese.

=== Teaching ministry ===
==== India ====
After Wilson completed his doctoral studies, he returned to India and took up a teaching assignment at the United Theological College, Bangalore and taught from 1977 to 1988 serving under two Principals, J. R. Chandran and E. C. John. For a year (1989), he served as Ecumenical Relations Director he moved to the Church of South India Synod on the invitation of the Moderator, Victor Premasagar.

==== Overseas ====
From 1989 to 1998, Wilson was at Geneva serving as Executive Secretary, Department of Theology, World Alliance of Reformed Churches, Geneva. Again, from 1998 to 2003, Wilson was Wilhelm Loehe Associate Professor of World Mission at the Wartburg Theological Seminary, Dubuque. From 2003 to 2006, Wilson was H. George Anderson Professor of Mission and Cultures at the Lutheran Theological Seminary at Philadelphia.

== Contribution to theological education ==
=== India ===
During Wilson's stint at the BTESSC from 1980-1988, he ensured that budding theologians were recognised and sent for higher theological education, both locally and internationally, to sustain its continuity in India. At the same time, research and publishing were carried on at BTESSC in a manner benefiting theological education. Vernacular language bibliographies were edited during Wilson's tenure at BTESSC along with Hunter P. Mabry and Zaihmingthanga, resulting in compilations titled Bibliography of Original Christian Writings (respective language). One such bibliography compiled by Ravela Joseph and B. Suneel Bhanu has been a source book for original Christian writings through which successive Theologians have used these compilations to increase their scholarship and research.

=== Global ===
As Executive Director of the Foundation for Theological Education in Southeast Asia based in Philadelphia, Wilson has been in the forefront of advancement of theological education both in mainland China as well as its neighbouring countries in South East Asia.

Academic offices
Preceded by T. V. Philip; 1976-1979	Director of Research and Church Relations, BTESSC, Bangalore; 1979-1988	Succeeded by C. L. Furtado; 1988
