= Fedric Anilkumar =

Indian theologian

Jackey
- Born: 19 July 1962 (age 63); Kodagu, Karnataka, India
- Occupation: Theologian
- Ordained: 1986
- Writings: 1985, Kannada Christa Sankerthanegalu (in Kannada); 2009, Symbolism or Idolatry? An appraisal of the use of the symbols in mission with special reference to Basel Mission in Karnataka, India, between 1834 and 1864
- Congregations served: Church of South India Karnataka Southern Diocese
- Offices held: Pastor, Church of South India Society (1986-2004)
- Title: The Reverend Doctor

Fedric Anilkumar is a Theologian who teaches at the Karnataka Theological College, Mangalore, a Seminary established in 1965 and affiliated to the nation's first University, the Senate of Serampore College (University).

Anilkumar has researched on Christian symbolism with special reference to one of the Protestant Church Societies in Karnataka, the Basel Evangelical Mission, which has since unionized itself into the Church of South India. The subject of Christian symbolism is largely taken as Idolatry causing a mix-up of sorts. However, Anilkumar points out that Christian symbolism is distinct from Idolatry.

Concerning Symbolism, the Theologian Louis La Ravoire Morrow drew out a secular standout as early as 1949,

Symbolism is essential to all kinds of religious worship. The Old Testament is full of it, forming the basis of our Christian symbolism, by which we apprehend through our senses a God-given and absolute beauty and truth.

As such, Morrow wrote that the early Church also began using symbolism from times immemorial,

From earliest times the Church has made use of symbols, to foster devotion, or to stand for some mystery of the Faith that needed to be kept secret from pagans. For instance: the early Church used a fish to stand for Christ; a town, a ship, or a woman with uplifted arms to stand for the Church.

As for the ambiguity in Christian symbolism, Morrow has explained that the Bible prohibits the worship of symbols but not the use of symbols as such. In such a setting, Anilkumar's work has made inroads into the world of Christian symbolism and also digs out the perspectives of the Missionaries, the ones who brought Christianity to India and the other from the perspective of the Indian Christians whose culture and ethos is rich in tradition and rituals. Pioneer Theologians like D. S. Amalorpavadass have already addressed these issues through the Second Vatican Council which voted in favour of inculturation. Much like D. S. Amalorpavadass, Anilkumar points out that Christian symbolism had a distinct meaning, each pointing out to a Biblical event and as such it could not be identified with Idolatry.

== Studies ==
Anilkumar had his ministerial formation at the Karnataka Theological College, Mangalore studying during the Principalships of C. D. Jathanna and C. L. Furtado and then joined the Church of South India in 1986. After a ministerial service, he proceeded to the United Kingdom and pursued postgraduate studies at the Birmingham University where he gained a postgraduate degree in 1999 specializing in pastoral ministry and returned to Mangalore to take up his teaching ministry.

For further research studies Anilkumar went to Germany where he researched at the Faculty of Philosophy at the University of Regensburg on the topic of Symbolism and successfully submitted a doctoral dissertation entitled Symbolism or idolatry? An appraisal of the use of symbols in mission with special reference to the Basel Mission in Karnataka, India, between 1834 and 1964 which was moderated by Professors Bröking-Bortfeld, Thomas Kothmann and Hans Schwarz after which the University awarded him a doctoral degree in 2009.

== Ecclesiastical ministry ==
=== Pastoral ===
As a Pastor of the Karnataka Southern Diocese of the Church of South India, Anilkumar also served in pastoral roles at the healthcare institutions, the CSI-Lombord Memorial Hospital, Udipi and the CSI-Holdsworth Memorial Hospital, Mysore. Anilkumar was a member of the Executive Committee of the Karnataka Southern Diocese of the Church of South India.

=== Teaching ===
Ever since Anilkumar completed his doctoral studies in 2009, he began teaching at his alma mater, the Karnataka Theological College, Mangalore, where he teaches Christian Ministry, an important subject in the University curriculum.

=== Ecumenical ===
Fedric Anilkumar was the Secretary of the Mangalore Christian Council which has been instrumental in hosting joint celebrations of the Catholic, Orthodox, Protestant and Charismatic Churches in Mangalore.

Academic offices
Preceded by	Teacher, Karnataka Theological College, Mangalore	Succeeded by
