= Ellen Charry =

American theologian and author

Ellen Tabitha Charry (born 1947) is an American theologian and author who is the Margaret W. Harmon Professor of Systematic Theology at Princeton Theological Seminary.

== Early life and education ==
Born Ellen T. Zubrack, Charry grew up in Philadelphia and earned a BA in social work at Barnard College. She then obtained a Masters in Social Work from Yeshiva University. After her children were born, she returned to study, graduating with both an MA and PhD in religion from Temple University. Her 1987 dissertation, supervised by Paul van Buren (himself a student of Karl Barth), was titled Franz Rosenzweig and the Freedom of God. From 1989 to 1991, she was a postdoctoral fellow at Yale Divinity School with a grant from the Henry Luce Foundation.

== Career ==
Charry was on the faculty of the Perkins School of Theology at Southern Methodist University from 1992 until 1997. She joined the faculty of Princeton Theological Seminary in 1997, teaching interfaith, historical and systematic theology. She is the Margaret W. Harmon Professor of Systematic Theology.

Charry has served on the editorial boards of The Christian Century, Scottish Journal of Theology, and Pro Ecclesia and edited Theology Today from 1997 to 2004.

Charry's research has focused on how religious commitments and theological convictions contribute to human flourishing, and interfaith understanding between Judaism and Christianity. She has written on Christian doctrine, moral formation, and the intersections between theology and psychology. She says that Christians have been averse to happiness, and argues that thinking about happiness is both consistent with Scripture and represented in ancient Christian thought. Her book God and the Art of Happiness coins the term "asherism" to refer to a happiness that is found in "the pursuit of an excellent way of life in community."

Combining her own personal experience with Judaism and Christianity with her philosophical thinking, she has written about the need for both Jews and Christians to overcome their differences and "help each other straighten out their own tradition."

== Personal life ==
Charry was married to Dana Charry, a psychiatrist, who died of lung cancer in 2003. Her chapter on lament in the book Lament: Reclaiming Practices in Pulpit, Pew, and Public Square shares letters they wrote to family and friends during his illness. She has two daughters and two granddaughters. Charry comes from a Jewish background and became an Episcopalian Christian while studying religion. Her PhD supervisor, Paul van Buren, was her baptismal sponsor.

== Selected publications ==
=== Books ===
- Moltmann, Jürgen; Wolterstorff, Nicholas; Charry, Ellen T. (1998). A Passion for God's Reign: Theology, Christian Learning and the Christian Self. Eerdmans. ISBN 9780802844941.
- Charry, Ellen T. (1999). By the Renewing of Your Minds: The Pastoral Function of Christian Doctrine. Oxford University Press. ISBN 9780195134865.
- Charry, Ellen T. (2000). Inquiring After God: Classic and Contemporary Readings. Wiley. ISBN 9780631205449.
- Charry, Ellen T. (2010). God and the Art of Happiness. Eerdmans. ISBN 9780802860323.
- Charry, Ellen T. (2015). Psalms 1-50: Sighs and Songs of Israel. Brazos Theological Commentary on the Bible. Brazos Press. ISBN 9781493400058.

=== Articles and chapters ===
- Charry, Ellen T. (2005). "May We Trust God and (Still) Lament? Can We Lament and (Still) Trust God?". In Patrick D. Miller; Sally A. Brown (eds.). Lament:Reclaiming Practices in Pulpit, Pew, and Public Square. Westminster John Knox Press. pp. 95–108. ISBN 9780664227500.
- Charry, Ellen T. (2005). "Sacramental Ecclesiology". In Mark Husbands; Daniel J. Treier (eds.). The Community of the Word:Toward an Evangelical Ecclesiology. InterVarsity Press. pp. 213–214.
- Charry, Ellen T. (2008). "Experiencing Salvation Liturgically". Theology in Service of the Church:Essays in Honor of Joseph D. Small. Geneva Press. pp. 57–67. ISBN 9780664502973.
- Charry, Ellen T.; Kosits, Russell D. (2016). "Christian theology and positive psychology: An exchange of gifts". The Journal of Positive Psychology. 12 (5): 468–479. doi:10.1080/17439760.2016.1228010. S2CID 152127114.
- Charry, Ellen T. (2017). "Theology and Psychology in Conversation". In Matthew A. White; Gavin R. Slemp; A. Simon Murray (eds.). Future Directions in Well-Being: Education, Organizations and Policy. Springer. pp. 35–38. ISBN 9783319568898.
