= K. David Udayakumar =

Indian theologian

Kurapati David Udayakumar
- Born: 30 September 1955 (age 70); Andhra Pradesh
- Education: B.A. (Venkateswara), B. D. (Serampore), M. Th. (Serampore), D. Th. (Serampore)
- Church: South Andhra Lutheran Church
- Writings: 1981, A Study of the Pauline View of Sin with special reference to Romans 1–8 in comparison with the teaching in the Gita; 1998, Church-in-Mission: Facing Contemporary Challenges; 2001, Impact of Context on Missionary Paradigm: Hermannsburg and Joint Synod of Ohio Missions in South Andhra Lutheran Church (1864–1945).
- Offices held: Pastor, South Andhra Lutheran Church (1981–1992) professor, Gurukul Lutheran Theological College, Chennai (1992–Present)
- Title: The Reverend Doctor

David Udayakumar (born 30 September 1955) was Principal of Gurukul Lutheran Theological College, Chennai, affiliated to the nation's first University, the Senate of Serampore College.

== Studies ==
After early ministerial formation at the United Theological College, Bangalore from 1977–1981 at the United Theological College, Bangalore, affiliated to the nation's first University, the Senate of Serampore College, under the Principalship of Joshua Russell Chandran, he obtained a Bachelor of Divinity and in the ensuing year, he returned to the Seminary for pursuing a postgraduate course, Master of Theology from 1982–1985 specialising in New Testament under Professors K. James Carl and J. G. Frank Collison where he worked out a dissertation entitled "Inheritance" in Pauline eschatology.

Udayakumar also registered for research studies with the Senate of Serampore College (University) and specialised in Missiology for which the University awarded him a Doctor of Theology degree in 2001.

All the three successive theological degrees, B. D., M. Th. and D. Th. were awarded by the Senate of Serampore College (University) during the Registrarship of D. S. Satyaranjan.

== Ecclesiastical career ==
After a brief 1-year ministry between 1981–1982, Udayakumar again became a Pastor from 1985 onwards pastoring Churches of the South Andhra Lutheran Church established by the Hermannsburg Mission in the districts of Chittoor and Nellore. In 1987, Udaykumar was Exchange Pastor of the Evangelical-Lutheran Mission in Lower Saxony from 1987 to 1992 and then joined the Gurukul Lutheran Theological College to take up a teaching assignment. In 2011, Udayakumar was made Principal of the College, a position which he has been occupying till the present times.

== Writings ==
- 1981, A Study of the Pauline View of Sin with special reference to Romans 1–8 in comparison with the teaching in the Gita,
- 1998, Church-in-Mission: Facing Contemporary Challenges,
- 2001, Impact of Context on Missionary Paradigm: Hermannsburg and Joint Synod of Ohio Missions in South Andhra Lutheran Church (1864–1945).

Academic offices
Preceded by S. W. Meshack; 2006–2011	Principal, Gurukul Lutheran Theological College, Chennai; 2011–2018	Succeeded by D. J. S. Ponnusamy
