= Elenchus of Biblica =

- Discipline: Biblical studies
- Language: English

Publication details
- Former name(s): Elenchus Bibliographicus Biblicus
- History: 1969-2011
- Publisher: Pontifical Biblical Institute (Italy)
- Frequency: Annually

Standard abbreviations
- ISO 4: Elenchus Biblica

Indexing
- ISSN: 0392-7423
- LCCN: 90649128
- OCLC no.: 985721230

Links
- Journal homepage

The Elenchus of Biblica was an annual bibliography listing of writings in a given year relating to Biblical studies published by the Pontifical Biblical Institute. It was split off from Biblica in 1969 as Elenchus Bibliographicus Biblicus, obtaining its final name in 1986. Publication was suspended after the 2011 volume.
