= Rajula Annie Watson =

Indian theologian

Rajula Annie Watson (nee Thomas)
- Born: Rajula Annie Thomas; 18 January 1960; India
- Occupation: Theologian
- Parent(s): Leelamma Thomas (Mother), Meporath Abraham Thomas (Father)
- Writings: See section
- Congregations served: Church of South India Karnataka Southern Diocese
- Title: The Reverend Doctor

Rajula Annie Watson (nee Thomas) is a theologian who presently teaches at the Karnataka Theological College, Mangalore, a seminary established in 1965 and affiliated to the nation's first university, the Senate of Serampore College. Annie has been a member of the Association of Theologically Trained Women of India since 1991 as well as Associate Presbyter at CSI-Hebich Memorial Church, Mangalore.

In 2008, the Evangelical Mission in Solidarity, Stuttgart, featured Annie in their journal darum-journal under the caption Kampf gegen die Erdewarmung.

== Studies ==
Annie studied bachelor's degree in theology at the United Theological College, Bangalore between 1987 and 1991 where she obtained a Bachelor of Divinity (B. D.) awarded by the Senate of Serampore College (University) under the Registrarship of D. S. Satyaranjan. She later studied for a doctorate at the University of Regensburg at the Faculty of Philosophy obtaining a Doctorate of Philosophy (Dr. Phil.) where she was supervised by Prof. Hans Schwarz.

On publication of Watson's doctoral thesis, titled, Development and Justice: A Christian Understanding of Land Ethics it was simultaneously reviewed in the following journals,

- Missionalia (2005),
- Theologische Literaturzeitung (2004),
- Theologische Revue (2004),
- Revue théologique de Louvain (2004),

== Writings ==
- 2004, Development and Justice: A Christian Understanding of Land Ethics,
- 2007, Overcoming Violence against Women,* 2007, Towards a Christian Land Ethic,
- 2010, Baptism, means of grace or means of conflicts? : the significance of baptism in today's religiously pluralistic society,
- 2010, Women and Mission in a pluralistic context
- 2011, Gender justice: towards full humanity of women and men
- 2014, Visibility of the invisible: Status and role of women in church mission and ministry

Academic offices
Preceded by -	Teacher, Karnataka Theological College, Mangalore	Succeeded by -
