= Sydney Salins =

College educator

The Reverend Sydney Sebastian Salins
- Born: Karnataka, India
- Occupation: Theologian
- Parent(s): Elizabeth (mother); W. A. Salins (father)
- Writings: The Institutions on Balmatta, Mangalore
- Congregations served: Church of South India Karnataka Southern Diocese

Sydney S. Salins is a New Testament scholar who teaches at the Karnataka Theological College, Mangalore, a seminary established in 1965 and affiliated to the nation's first university, the Senate of Serampore College (University).

Salins was a participant at the original exploratory committee on dialogue in 1997 conducted by the World Council of Churches

== Studies ==
Salins had his ministerial formation at the United Theological College, Bangalore, between 1970 and 1974, studying along with his companion John Sadananda for a Bachelor of Divinity (B. D.) awarded by the Senate of Serampore College (University) under the registrarship of J. T. Krogh. Again from 1980 to 1982, Salins studied along with another companion Surya Prakash for a postgraduate course specialising in the New Testament under J. G. F. Collison and K. James Carl and submitted a dissertation entitled A study of the use of the christological title, "Son of Man" in the writings up to 325 AD for which he was awarded a Master of Theology (M. Th.) degree by the university under the Registrarship of D. S. Satyaranjan.

== Teaching ministry ==
Soon after his graduate studies at the Protestant Regional Seminary in Bangalore, Salins began teaching at the Karnataka Theological College, Mangalore, from 1974 onwards and later availed study leave to equip himself with a postgraduate degree in New Testament in 1982. After a forty-year teaching ministry that began in 1974, Salins retired in early 2015 on attaining superannuation but continues to teach at the Seminary in Mangalore.

Academic offices
| Preceded by Sunanda Anandakumara | Teacher-in-New Testament; Karnataka Theological College, Mangalore; 1974–2015 | Succeeded by D. R. Sadananda |
