= Karnataka Theological College =

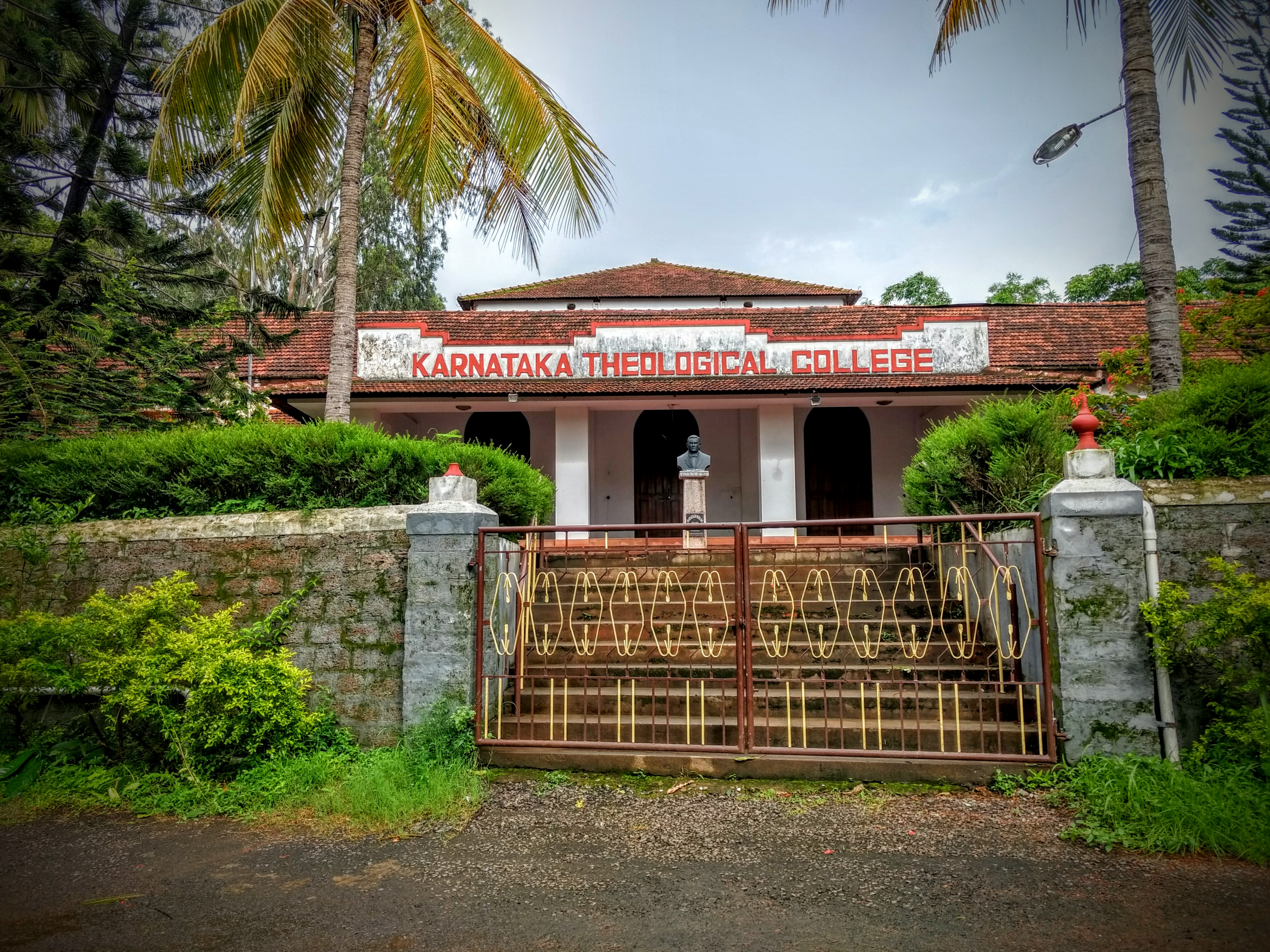
- Type: Seminary
- Established: 1847; 179 years ago
- Affiliations: Senate of Serampore College (University)
- Principal: The Rev. Dr. H. M. Watson, CSI, Dr. Theol. (Regensburg, Germany)
- Location: Mangaluru, Karnataka, India
- Website: http://www.kaces.org/KTC/homepage

Karnataka Theological College (founded in 1847) is an ecumenical seminary catering to the Kannada-speaking students wishing to pursue the priestly vocation. KTC is located in Mangaluru of Karnataka in South India, and is affiliated to the nation's first University, the Senate of Serampore College.

== History ==
Succession of Biblical Studies Faculty
Old Testament and Hebrew Language; The Rev. C. D. Jathanna, Dr. Theol. (Hamburg), The Rev. D. Dhanaraj, Dr. Phil. (Osnabrück), The Rev. J. S. Sadananda, Dr. Theol. (Göttingen), The Rev. K. Sagar Sundar Raj, M.Th. (Serampore); New Testament and Greek Language; The Rev. Sunanda Anandakumara, Dr. Theol. (Hamburg), The Rev. Sydney Salins, M.Th. (Serampore), The Rev. Daniel Sadananda, Dr. Theol. (Bethel), The Rev. Christopher George, M.Th. (Serampore)

The Karnataka Theological College was founded in 1847 with the coming together of two distinct theological seminaries,

- the Union Kanarese Seminary (UKS) founded in 1912 in Tumkur, and
- the Basel Evangelical Mission Theological Seminary (BEMTS) founded in 1847 in Mangalore.

In 1967, C. D. Jathanna, the then principal of the college formed the Karnataka Christian Educational Society with the College as the nucleus along with another institute, the Hebich Technical Training Institute. He added several new educational institutions such as Balmatta Institute of Printing Technology, Balmatta Institute of Commerce, KACES ITI in Stichcraft, KACES Hostel, and Moegling Institute of German Language. At Present Karnataka Theological College offers residential Bachelor of Divinity degree course and the external courses of B.C.S., Dip. C.S. and C. Th. The students are basically from three dioceses of the Church of South India, Lutherans and Methodists and this is the only regional Theological College which offers training in Kannada language in Karnataka.

== Present staff ==
Present Faculty at the Karnataka Theological College with subjects taught
Discipline	Faculty Name	Gen der	Teaching Status	Highest Degree	Alma mater	University
Old Testament	The Rev. K. Sagar Sundar Raj	Male	Full-time	M.Th.	UTC, Bangalore	Serampore
New Testament	The Rev. Christopher George	Male	Full-time	M. Th.	UTC, Bangalore	Serampore
Systematic Theology	The Rev. H. M. Watson	Male	Full-time	Dr. Theol.	University of Regensburg, Regensburg	Regensburg
History of Religions	The Rev. B. Chennakesavalu	Male	Full-time	M.Th.	Gurukul, Chennai	Serampore
Christian Ministry	The Rev. F. Anilkumar	Male	Full-time	Dr. Theol.	University of Regensburg, Regensburg	Regensburg
Women's Studies	The Rev. Annie Watson	Female	Full-time	Dr. Theol.	University of Regensburg, Regensburg	Regensburg
History of Christianity	The Rev. P. C. James	Male	Full-time	M.Th.	-	Serampore
History of Christianity	The Rev. C. L. Furtado	Male	Part-time	Dr. Theol.	Missions Academy, Hamburg	Hamburg
Social analysis	The Rev. Mohan Manoraj	Male	Part-time	M.Th.	TTS, Madurai	Serampore
Social Analysis/Indian Society	Dr. V. Basil Hans	Male	Part-time	Ph.D.	Mangalore University, Mangalore	Mangalore
English Literature	Sherly Furtado	Female	Part-time			
Missions	The Rev. H. S. Wilson	Male	Part-time	Ph.D.	Drew University, Madison	Drew

== Gallery ==
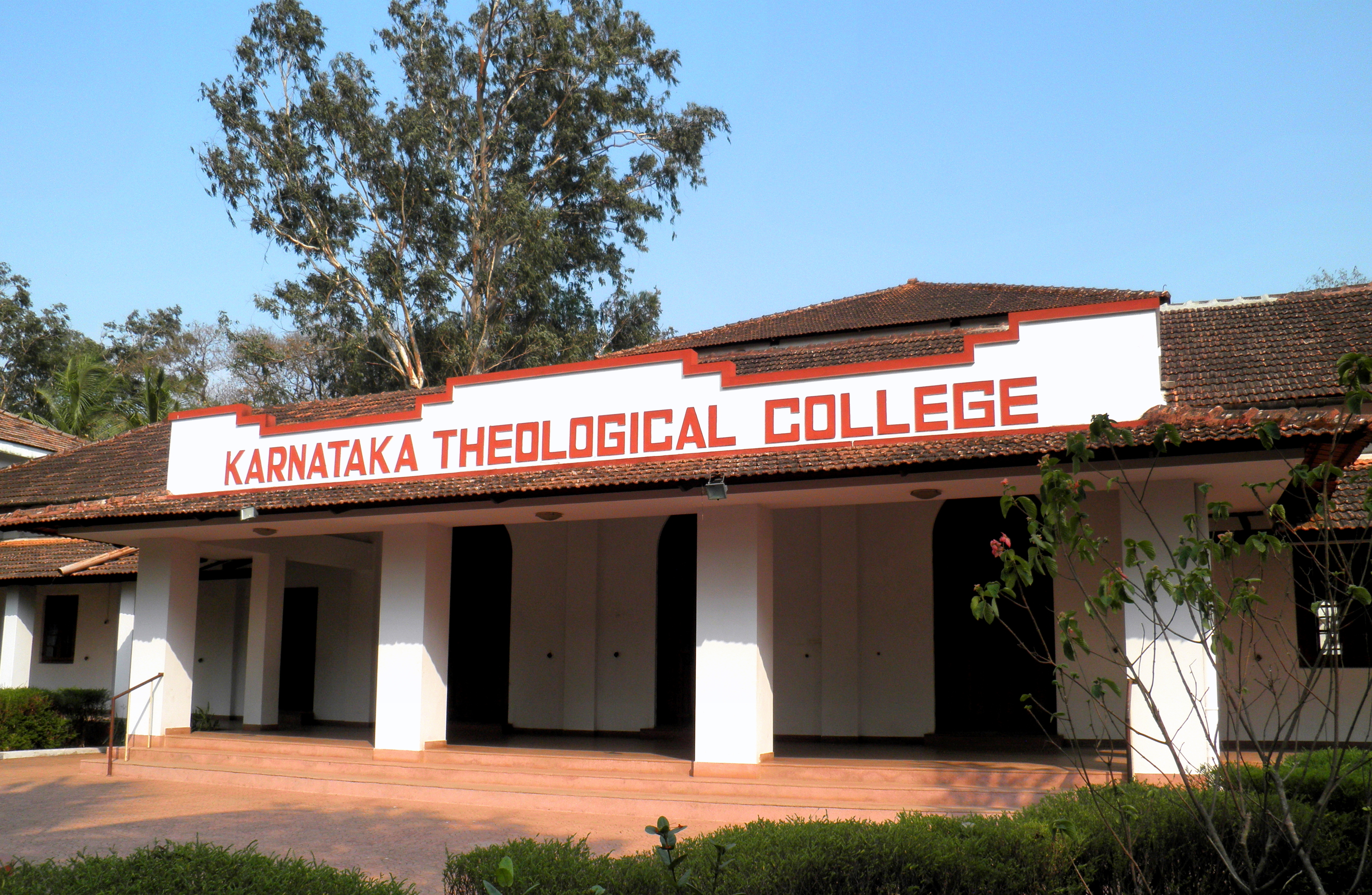
Edifice

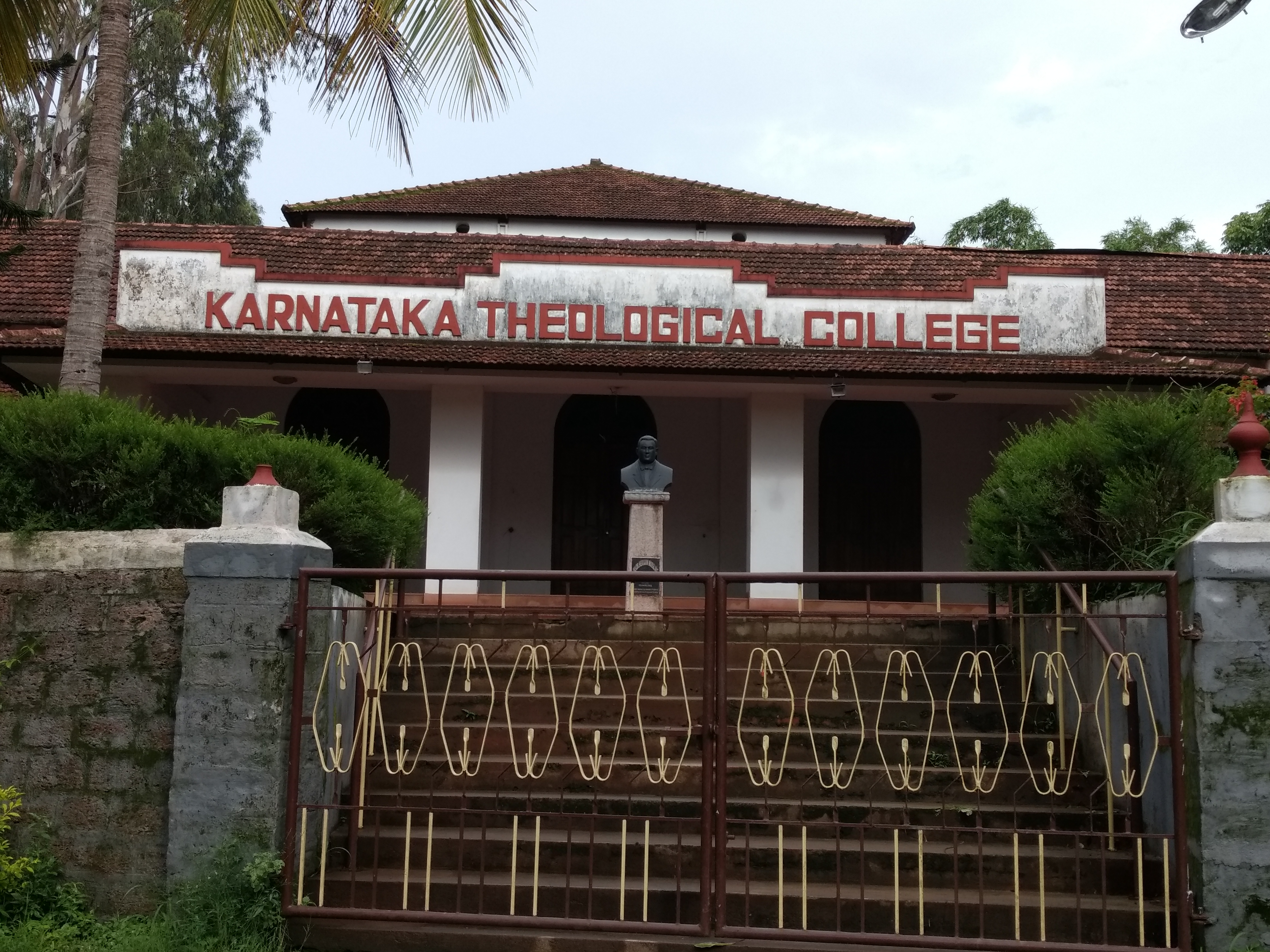
Gate close up

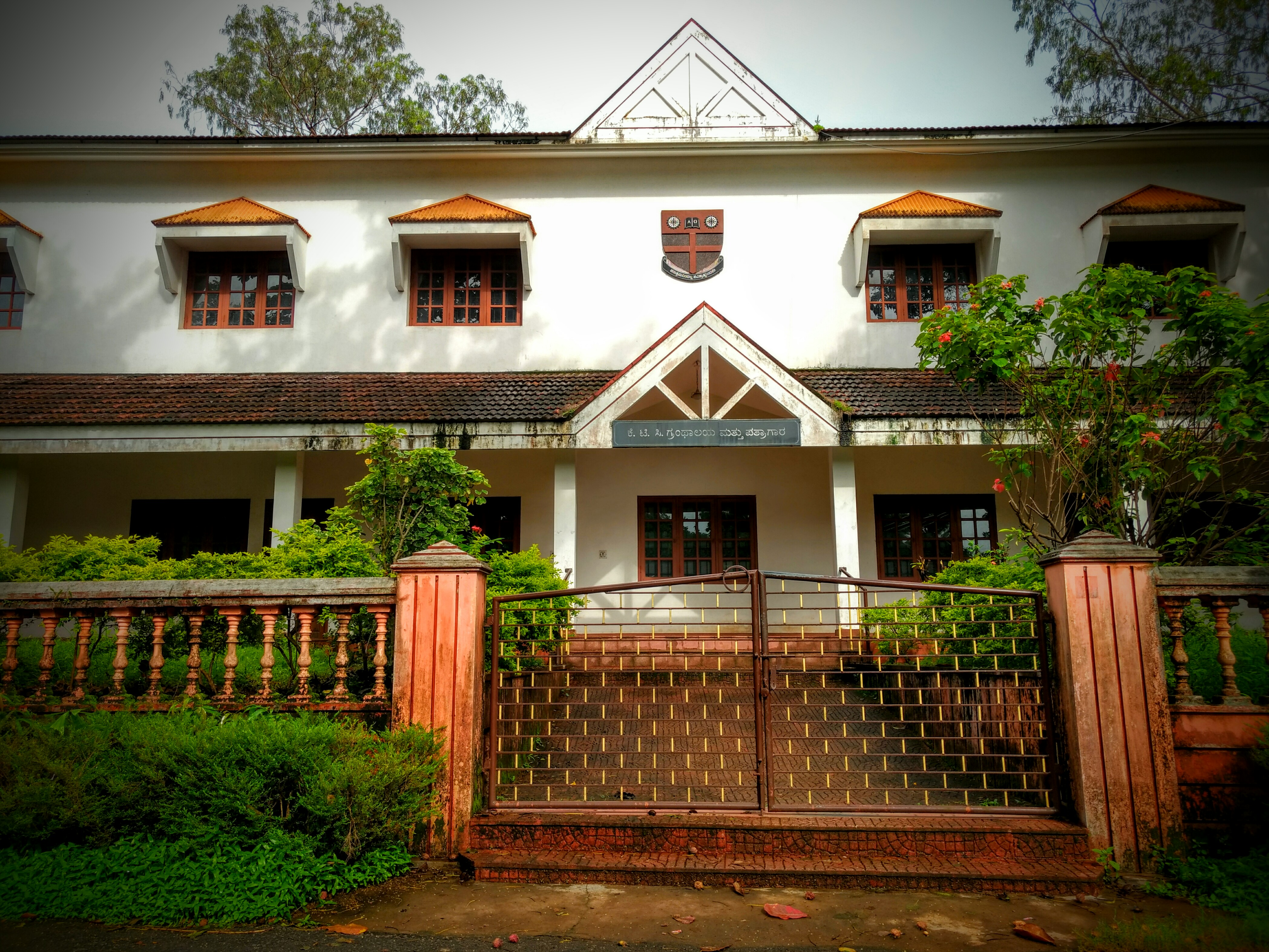
Library

== Succession of Administrators ==
Years	Name	Academic credentials
1965–1967	The Rev. R. Scheuermeier,	D. D. (Serampore),
1967–1983	The Rev.^{✝} C. D. Jathanna	Dr. Theol. (Hamburg)
1983–1991	The Rev. C. L. Furtado	Dr. Theol. (Hamburg),
1991–2009	The Rev. J. S. Sadananda	Dr. Theol. (Göttingen),
2009–2020	The Rev. H. R. Cabral,	D.Th. (Serampore)
2020-Present	The Rev. Dr. H. M. Watson,	Dr. Theol. (Regensburg, Germany)

== Notable persons associated with the seminary ==
- The Rev.^{✝} D. P. Shettian, Past pupil and Bishop,
- The Rev.^{✝} S. R. Furtado, Faculty member and Bishop,
- The Rev.^{✝} S. J. Samartha, Faculty member of the erstwhile Basel Evangelical Mission Theological Seminary,
- The Rev. Devaraj Bangera, Past pupil and Bishop Emeritus,
- The Rev. D. I. Hans, Teacher of Religions.
- The Reverend Dr Hannibal Richard Cabral
