= E. C. John =

Indian Old Testament scholar

The Reverend E. C. John D. D. (Honoris causa)
- Born: Elavinakuzhy Cherian John; 8 November 1927; Travancore
- Died: 29 October 2020 (aged 92); Bangalore, Karnataka
- Other name: ECJ
- Education: B.Sc. (Travancore), B.D. (Serampore), B.A. (Cantab.), M.A. (Cantab.), Dr. Theol. (Heidelberg)
- Alma mater: University of Travancore, Thiruvananthapuram, United Theological College, Bangalore, University of Cambridge (United Kingdom), University of Heidelberg (Germany)
- Occupations: Priesthood; Theology; Church
- Years active: 1954-2007
- Spouse: Juliane Hanna John (nee Ehrenberg)

Ecclesiastical career
- Religion: Christianity
- Church: Church of South India, Madhya Kerala Diocese
- Ordained: 1954
- Congregations: CSI Church, Tiruvalla (1954-1957)
- Offices held: Teacher - in - Old Testament, United Theological College, Bangalore (1959-1993)

E. C. John (8 November 1927 – 29 October 2020) was an Indian Old Testament scholar and a member of the Society for Biblical Studies in India. He was also a member of the George Bell Institute at the University of Chichester, Chichester and the Society for Old Testament Study, England.

He was acknowledged for his scholarship of the Old Testament. G. Babu Rao, one of his earliest pupils specializing in the Old Testament wrote that his professor, E. C. John pointed out parallels for Epiphany and Theophany from Vaishnavism and Saivism respectively.

== Writings ==
=== Books written ===
- 1968, Death and life in the prophecy of judgment with reference to Amos, Hosea, Isaiah and Jeremiah,
- 1983, The Servant of the Lord (Meditations on the Prophets),
- 1999 (with Juliane Hanna John nee Ehrenberg), To Tell of the Struggle is a Struggle: Resistance, Protest and Witness during the Third Reich,

=== Books edited ===
- 2006 (with Samson Prabhakar), Christian Identity and Cultural Nationalism: Challenges and Opportunities,

=== Articles ===
- 1954, On Reviving the Peace Movement for World Peace, United Theological College (Bangalore) and World Council of Churches (Geneva). With Juliane Hanna Ehrenberg, Bangalore, CMS, Church of England), colleagues and friends at Church of South India and Church of North India.
- 1969, Forgiveness in the Prophecy of Judgment,
- 1971, Divine Manifestations,
- 1974, Old Testament understanding of death,
- 1977, Righteousness in the prophets,
- 1977, Life and Death in Old Testament Research,
- 1978, Theological Research and the Churches in India: Old Testament,
- 1984, Israel and Inculturation: An Appraisal,
- 1984, Fellowship in the Holy Spirit - Biblical Perspectives,
- 1985, A vision for the future,
- 2004, The Reception of the Old Testament in India,
- 2007, Reading the Old Testament from a Dalit Perspective,

== Studies ==
After completing graduate studies in sciences leading to B.Sc., E. C. John chose priesthood as a full time vocation and went for spiritual formation in Bangalore.

=== Spiritual studies ===
John studied theology at the United Theological College, Bengaluru from 1951 to 1954 when Max Hunter Harrison was its Principal. From 1954 to 1957 he served as a presbyter of the Church of South India in Tiruvalla.

=== Advanced spiritual studies ===
In 1957 he was sent to the University of Cambridge, Cambridge where he pursued both graduate and postgraduate studies leading to B. A. (1959) and M. A. (1963) specializing in Old Testament (MA Tripos part iii). During John's stay at the University of Cambridge, the decennial Lambeth Conference took place which John attended it as a guest along with Leslie Brown, and Lesslie Newbigin.

=== Doctoral research ===
While teaching at the Seminary in Bengaluru, he applied for the Alexander von Humboldt research fellowship and went on study leave from the Seminary to the University of Heidelberg, Heidelberg for doctoral studies in Old Testament where he studied with Claus Westermann and Gerhard von Rad who were experts in Old Testament studies. During John's study period in Heidelberg, his companions included Ulrich Bergmann (Neuendettelsau Mission), Ms Whittaker, Nicholas J. Tromp, who spent a period of study at the university. Upon completion of his doctoral studies in 1968, John's thesis was published with the title, Death and life in the prophecy of judgment with reference to Amos, Hosea, Isaiah and Jeremiah, E. C. John returned to Bengaluru and continued teaching in the United Theological College till his retirement in 1993.

== Contributions ==
=== Teaching ===
After John completed his studies in Cambridge University in 1959, he began teaching the Old Testament in Bangalore for generations of students both at the graduate, postgraduate and doctoral levels. In 1983 E. C. John took charge as principal of the United Theological College, Bengaluru from his predecessor Joshua Russell Chandran and continued as principal until 1993 when he relinquished charge and handed over the baton to Gnana Robinson.

John's legacy of teaching has passed on to his postgraduate students who specialized in the Old Testament and Hebrew language, which continued through those who took up teaching at seminaries elsewhere comprising,

- 1968-1970, John Guy Bookless, at the United Theological College, Bangalore,
- 1969-1971, Anil Kumar Daniel Solanki,
- 1971-1973, G. Babu Rao, CBCNC, at the Serampore College, Serampore and later at the Andhra Christian Theological College, Secunderabad,
- 1971-1973, Timotheas Hembrom, NELC, at the Bishop’s College, Calcutta,
- 1976-1978, D. Dhanaraj, CSI, at the Karnataka Theological College, Mangalore,
- 1977-1979, J. Bhaskar Jeyaraj, at the South Asia Institute of Advanced Christian Studies, Bangalore,
- 1978-1980, Geevarghese Mathew, MMTSC, at the Mar Thoma Theological Seminary, Kottayam,
- 1979-1981, G. D. V. Prasad, CSI, at the Bishop’s College, Calcutta,
- 1980-1982, D. Jones Muthunayagom, CSI, at the Tamil Nadu Theological Seminary, Madurai and later at United Theological College, Bangalore,
- 1980-1982, James Vijayakumar, at the United Theological College, Bangalore,
- 1981-1983, Mani Chacko, CSI, at the Gurukul Lutheran Theological College, Chennai,
- 1985-1987, M. Prithvi Raju, AELC, at the Andhra Evangelical Lutheran Church Seminary in Rajahmundry,
- 1986-1988, Ch. Victor Moses, AELC, at the Gurukul Lutheran Theological College, Chennai,
- 1986-1988, N. V. Luther Paul, AELC, at the Andhra Christian Theological College, Secunderabad,
- 1987-1989, D. John Samuel Ponnusamy, CSI, at the Tamil Nadu Theological Seminary, Madurai,
- 1987-1989, J. R. John Samuel Raj, CSI, at the Kerala United Theological Seminary, Trivandrum and later at the United Theological College, Bangalore,

=== Commentary ===
John led the editorial team comprising M. J. Joseph, K. V. Mathew, Jacob Verghis, Saphir P. Athyal and Mathew P. John that worked to bring out the One volume Malayalam Bible Commentary with contributions from 47 Scholars and published in 1979 through the Theological Literature Committee, Tiruvalla.

=== Peace studies ===
John worked with an international community of theologians at United Theological College, on the peace movement and peace for the people, in association with the World Council of Churches, and their advisory responsibilities with the United Nations Organization.

=== Hobbies ===
John was an avid gardener and enthusiastic tennis and volleyball player. He taught himself to play the flute.

== Honours ==
In the Senate of Serampore College (University) Convocation 2009 held at the Tamil Nadu Theological Seminary, Madurai, John was awarded a Doctor of Divinity honoris causa.

== Reminisce ==
Talathoti Punnaiah who studied a postgraduate course leading to Master of Theology at the United Theological College, Bangalore from 1989-1991 recalls his association with John, "E. C. John was my Principal at the College. He was a good Administrator."

Professional and academic associations
| Preceded by R. Van de Walle, SJ | President, Society for Biblical Studies in India; 1970–1972 | Succeeded by Joseph Pathrapankal, CMI |
Academic offices
| Preceded by Max Hunter Harrison, ABCFM | Teacher - in - Old Testament, United Theological College, Bengaluru (Karnataka); 1959–1993 | Succeeded by Gnana Robinson, CSI |
| Preceded by J. R. Chandran, CSI | Principal, United Theological College, Bengaluru (Karnataka); 1983–1993 | Succeeded by Gnana Robinson, CSI |
