= Shrimati =

Indian honorific

Sreemati, also spelt Srimati, Shreemati, Shrimathi, and Shrimatty (Sanskrit: श्रीमती, pronounced [ʃɾiːmɐt̪iː]; abbreviated as Smt.) is a traditional Indian honorific used to address or refer to married women. It is equivalent to the English title "Mrs." and is commonly prefixed to the name of a married woman in many Indian languages including Sanskrit, Hindi, Bengali, Marathi, Tamil.

== Etymology ==
The word Shrimati originates from Sanskrit, in which Shri means "wealth," "prosperity," or is used as a respectful title, and -mati is a suffix meaning "possessing" or "having." Together, Shrimati conveys a respectful address to a woman.

== Usage ==
Shrimati is traditionally used before the name of a married woman in formal, social, and official contexts in India and among Indian diaspora communities worldwide. It serves as a mark of respect and is often abbreviated as Smt. in written communication.

== Kumari ==
Kumari (Sanskrit: कुमारी; Sanskrit pronunciation: [kuːmɑːriː]) is a traditional honorific used in India, Nepal, Bangladesh, and other South Asian countries to address or refer to an unmarried woman. It is similar to the English title "Miss" and is usually placed before a woman's name to indicate her unmarried status.

Unlike Shrimati, which is used for married women, Kumari explicitly denotes unmarried women, reflecting cultural and social distinctions in many South Asian communities. It is commonly used in formal settings such as official documents, invitations, and spoken communication.

In some cultural and religious contexts, Kumari also refers to a goddess worshipped as a symbol of purity and divine femininity.

Although modern usage is evolving, Kumari remains an important and widely recognized honorific in South Asia.
