= Joshua Russell Chandran =

Indian Christian theologian

Joshua Chandran
- Born: 6 May 1918; Kadamangudi, Thanjavur district, British India (now in Tamil Nadu, India
- Died: 27 September 2000 (aged 82); Bangalore (now Bengaluru), Karnataka, India
- Other names: Chandran
- Education: University of Madras, Chennai (BA & MA); United Theological College, Bengaluru (BD Honours); Mansfield College, Oxford (B.Litt.); Union Theological Seminary in the city of New York (S.T.M.)
- Church: Church of South India, Diocese of Kanyakumari
- Ordained: 20 October 1946
- Writings: See separate section
- Offices held: Principal, United Theological College, Bengaluru
- Title: Reverend Doctor

Joshua Russell Chandran (6 May 1918 – 27 September 2000) was an Indian Christian theologian, who served as President of Senate of Serampore College, Bengal (1970–1), and as President of the United Theological College, Bangalore (1954–83), and was for some years a vice-chairman of the World Council of Churches (1966–68).

== Early life and education ==
Joshua Russell Chandran was born in Nagercoil, South India, on 6 May 1918 into a family who were communicant members of the South India United Church. After schooling and collegiate education, he took his BA and MA in Mathematics at the University of Madras, Chennai (1933–1938).

In 1941 he enrolled at the United Theological College, Bengaluru in 1941, where he took his B.D. in 1945.

=== Pastorate and further study ===
Chandran belonged to the South India United Church; which made him a pastor of South Travancore Church Council in 1945. He was ordained on 20 October 1946, and he continued serving as pastor until 1947.

in 1947 he left India for Britain, to study at the University of Oxford, Mansfield College, Oxford for pursuing a B.Litt. His B.Litt. thesis was titled A Comparison of the pagan apologetic of Celsus against Christianity as contained in Origen's Contra Celsum and the neo-Hindu attitude to Christianity as represented in the works of Vivekananda and an estimate of the value of Origen's reply for Christian apologetics with reference to neo-Hinduism.

He then studied at Union Theological Seminary, New York, during the academic year 1949–1950 earning an S.T.M.

=== Teacher ===
On his return to India in 1950 the Church of South India asked him to teach theology and ethics at the United Theological College, Bengaluru, then under the Principalship of Max Hunter Harrison. In 1954 Chandran succeeded Max Hunter Harrison as Principal, and remained in post until 1983, when he was succeeded by E. C. John.

== Contribution ==
=== Theological education ===
As the first Indian Principal of the United Theological College, Bengaluru, J. R. Chandran provided quality leadership to the College in many aspects.

In 1970 and 1971 he also served as President of the Senate of Serampore College.

In the academic year 1964–65, Chandran was Henry Winters Luce Visiting Professor of World Christianity at the Union Theological Seminary in the city of New York.

He was the first President of the Ecumenical Association of Third World Theologians (EATWOT) for the first five-year term (1975–1981).

=== Church leadership ===
Chandran served as Vice Moderator of the Central Committee of the World Council of Churches from 1966 to 1968. His contribution to ecumenism was far-reaching.

== Honours ==
India's first University, the Senate of Serampore College (University) in West Bengal conferred upon Russell Chandran an honorary doctorate in 1962.

In 1978 Samuel Amirtham and others also came out with a festschrift in honour of Chandran, titled A Vision for Man: Essays on Faith, Theology, and Society in Honour of Joshua Russell Chandran.

== Retirement and death ==
Although Russell Chandran retired in 1984, he began living in Bengaluru. He went to Suva, Fiji, to the Pacific Theological College for some time before returning to Bengaluru.

On 27 September 2000, Joshua Russell Chandran died in Bangalore.

Academic offices
Preceded by M. H. Harrison; 1937–1954	Principal; United Theological College, Bengaluru; 1954–1984	Succeeded by E. C. John; 1984–1993

== See also ==
- Rev. Dr. B. V. Subbamma
- Rev. Yisu Das Tiwari
- Bishop N. D. Ananda Rao Samuel
- Rev. Fr. Dr. D. S. Amalorpavadass
- Rev. Emani Sambayya
- Bishop Victor Premasagar
