= P. Surya Prakash =

Indian bishop

Bishop Emeritus, P. Surya Prakash, CSI
- Bishop Emeritus – in – Karimnagar
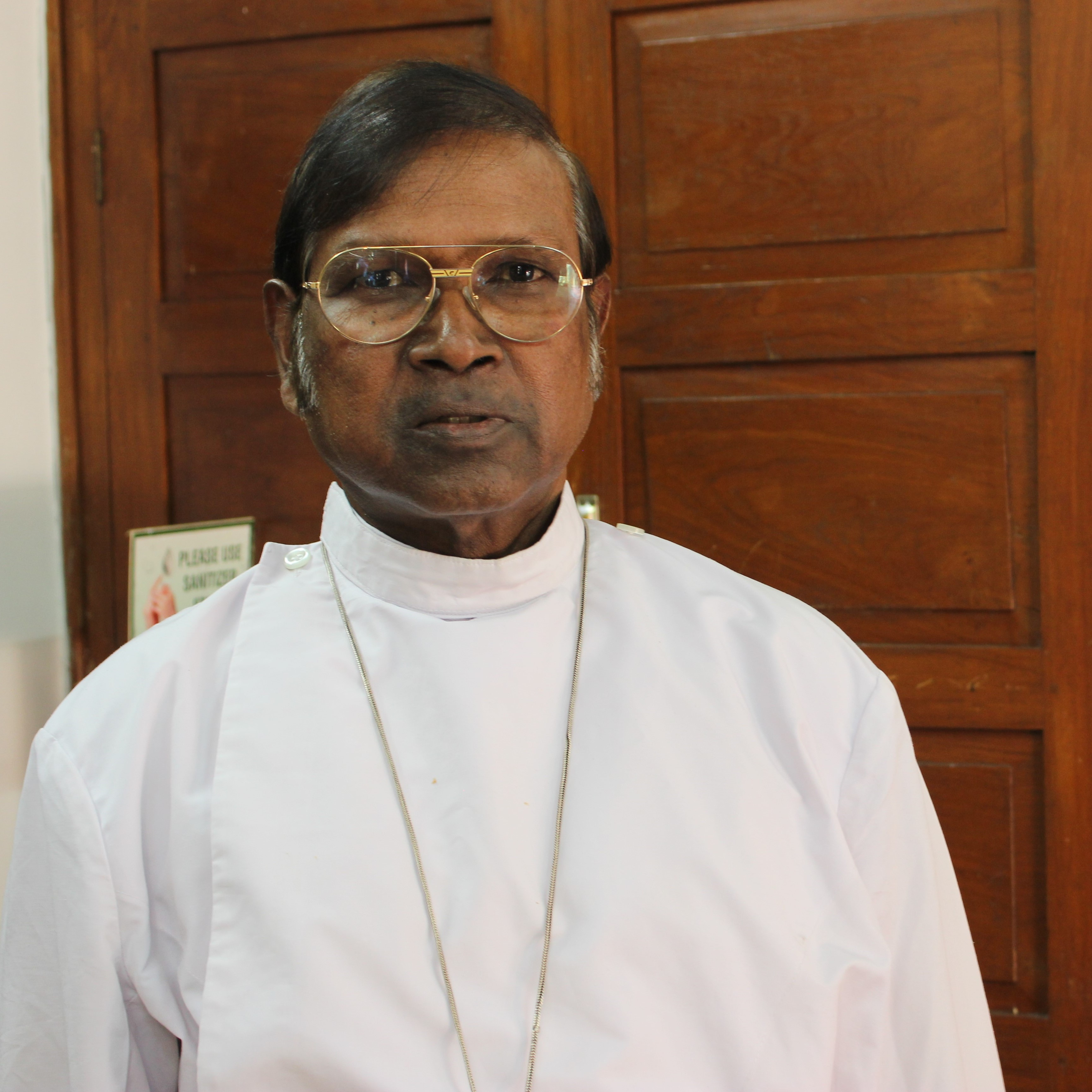
- Church: Church of South India
- Diocese: Karimnagar
- See: Church of South India
- In office: 2007–2014
- Predecessor: S. John Theodore
- Successor: K. Reuben Mark
- Previous posts: Pastor, Diocese of Medak (1976–1986); Associate Presbyter, CSI-St. Mark's Cathedral, Bangalore (1991-2000); Professor of Homiletics, United Theological College, Bangalore (1991-2000); India Liaison Secretary, Evangelical Mission in Solidarity, Stuttgart (2000-2005); President, India Sunday School Union, Coonoor (2002-2011); Presbyter-in-charge, CSI-Church of St. John the Baptist, Secunderabad (2005-2007); Member, Council of the Senate of Serampore College (University), Serampore, (2006-2017); President, Christian Institute for the Study of Religion and Society, Bangalore (2007-2011); Bishop - in - Karimnagar, Church of South India (2007-2014); Chairperson, Andhra Christian Theological College, Hyderabad (2009-2011); President, United Theological College, Bangalore (2009-2012); Chairperson, Henry Martyn Institute, Hyderabad (2010-2015)

Orders
- Ordination: 31 July 1977, Medak by The Right Reverend B. G. Prasada Rao, Bishop - in - Medak
- Consecration: 26 March 2007 by The Most Reverend B. P. Sugandhar, Moderator

Personal details
- Born: 28 February 1949 (age 77) Dudgaon, Nizamabad District, Andhra Pradesh

Bishop Emeritus P. Surya Prakash was the fifth Bishop-in-Karimnagar Diocese of the Church of South India. from 2007 through 2014 and occupied the Cathedra in Karimnagar's Wesley Cathedral. He retired on account of superannuation in 2014 following which the Church of South India Synod headquartered in Chennai appointed a successor to him in 2015.

After discerning his avocation towards priesthood, Surya Prakash entered the portals of a Protestant Seminary in 1972 in Bangalore where he studied spirituality leading to the award of the graduate degree of Bachelor of Divinity in 1976 after which he began pastoring parishes within the ecclesiastical jurisdiction of the Diocese of Medak, Church of South India. In 1980, Surya Prakash went on to major in Greek and New Testament and became a member of the Society for Biblical Studies, India in which his Professor, J. G. F. Collison was already a distinguished member. Again from 1982, Surya Prakash continued to pastor parishes of the Diocese of Medak until Victor Premasagar sent him for doctoral studies in 1987 to the Kirchliche Hochschule, Bethel, Bielefeld, Germany where researched on Homiletics specializing in indigenous movements and Churches in India, especially the work of Sadhu Sundar Singh. Roger E. Hedlund, the Missiologist with major contribution to indigenous Christianity in India terms Surya Prakash as a leading authority on Sadhu Sundar Singh.

From 1991 onwards, Surya Prakash spent nearly a decade teaching Homiletics at the United Theological College, Bangalore, an autonomous College affiliated to the Senate of Serampore College (University) until 2000 when he went to Stuttgart as India Liaison Secretary of the EMS succeeding Luise Plock who bridged the gap after C. L. Furtado. After a distinguished record at Stuttgart, Surya Prakash returned to India in 2005 donning the role of a Presbyter at the Diocese of Medak until his elevation to the Bishopric in 2007 in the adjoining Diocese of Karimnagar to succeed the Old Testament Scholar and Bishop S. J. Theodore who retired on attaining superannuation.

Surya Prakash contributes as an academic and as an administrator to the Church taking into consideration not only the mainline Churches but the small and indigenous Churches in India as well. In 2006, India's first University (a University under Section 2 (f) of the University Grants Commission Act, 1956)with degree-granting authority validated by a Danish Charter and ratified by the Government of West Bengal elected Surya Prakash as a Member of its Council. In 2010, the Henry Martyn Institute, Hyderabad an Institute with inter-faith concerns with focus on Islam partnered by the Canadian Baptist Ministries elected Surya Prakash as its Chairperson where he provides leadership in an inter-religious setting.

== Early years and studies ==
Surya Prakash was born in Dudgaon in Nizamabad District in undivided Andhra Pradesh, India to Smt. Guyyani Sundaramma and Sri Perumalla Prakasham who realised the need for education and sent him to the CSI-Wesley Boys High School, Secunderabad from where he completed schooling and pre-university studies in 1968 and continued higher studies at the State-run Nizam College of the Osmania University where he earned a graduate degree leading to Bachelor of Arts in English in 1972.

=== Spirituality and Seminary studies ===
During the incumbency of Bishop H. D. L. Abraham, then Bishop – in – Medak (1968–1975), Surya Prakash evinced interest in pursuing a priestly vocation and was sent to the United Theological College, Bengaluru in 1972, then headed by the eminent theologian Joshua Russell Chandran, where Surya Prakash completed the graduate degree of Bachelor of Divinity (B. D.) in 1976 during the Registrarship of D. S. Satyaranjan at Bengaluru. Incidentally, Christopher Asir and J. W. Gladstone who also led the Bishopric of the Church of South India in other dioceses also happened to pursue theology at the same College during that period.

=== Ordination & Pastorship ===
Soon after Surya Prakash's return to his Diocese, he was assigned a Deacon's role in Parishes of the Diocese of Medak and assigned to Varni near Nizamabad and was ordained by then Bishop – in – Medak, B. G. Prasada Rao (1976–1981) as a Presbyter on 31 July 1977 in the Medak Cathedral in Medak after which he was made Presbyter – in – Charge in Adilabad.

=== Post-graduate studies ===
The Diocese of Medak sent Surya Prakash to pursue further studies in theology and was sent again to the United Theological College, Bengaluru where he enrolled for the post-graduate degree of Master of Theology (M. Th.) in the discipline of New Testament in 1980 studying under J. G. F. Collison and K. James Carl then Professors of New Testament who stipulated a tough regimen of study which Surya Prakash stuck to and worked out a dissertation entitled Theological motives in Mark - a redactional critical study. This was during the time that the Old Testament Scholar G. Babu Rao began doctoral studies in Bengaluru. Prakash's classmates included Prasanna Kumari Samuel of the Andhra Evangelical Lutheran Church.

Surya Prakash also went to Boston University, Boston, Massachusetts and had an exposure at the Boston University School of Theology where he was also Student Chaplain at the United Methodist Church of All Nations By the year 1982, Surya Prakash was awarded an M. Th. in New Testament by the Senate of Serampore College. Prakash was then reassigned a ministerial role in the Diocese of Medak as Presbyter – in – Charge in Bellampalli.

=== Research ===
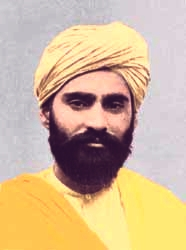
Sadhu Sundar Singh, the inspiration for Prof. Surya Prakash's doctoral thesis at Bielefeld.

In the year 1987, during the Bishopric of the Old Testament Scholar the Right Reverend Victor Premasagar (1982–1992), Surya Prakash was sent for higher studies to Bielefeld, North Rhine-Westphalia, Germany where he pursued a doctoral degree (Dr. Theol.) in Homiletics under the India-born Traugott Stählin at the Kirchliche Hochschule Bethel. submitting a dissertation entitled "The Preaching of Sadhu Sundar Singh: A Homiletic Analysis of Independent Preaching and Personal Christianity" which was later published in 1991.

== Ecclesiastical contribution ==
=== Professorship ===
The United Theological College, Bengaluru, then under the Principalship of the Old Testament Scholar E. C. John invited Surya Prakash to serve on its faculty where he began teaching Practical Theology from 1991 to 2000. Apart from his teaching, Prakash continued to don the priestly mantle. He was Associate Presbyter at St. Peter's Telugu Church, Mission Road and at St. Mark's Cathedral, Bangalore Mahatma Gandhi Road, Bangalore. In 1993 during the Principalship of the Old Testament Scholar Gnana Robinson Prakash was sent to Princeton Theological Seminary, New Jersey for a course in Speech Communication in Ministry and Worship During the academic year 1997 – 1998, the Professor went on a sabbatical as Visiting Professor to San Francisco Theological Seminary, San Anselmo and thereafter to Germany to the historical Mission Seminary in Hermannsburg. He also taught at his alma mater Kirchliche Hochschule Bethel, Bielefeld before returning to Bengaluru.

=== Administratorship ===
==== Evangelisches Missionswerk in Südwestdeutschland (EMS) ====
While teaching at the Seminary in Bengaluru, the Evangelisches Missionswerk in Südwestdeutschland (EMS) – (Association of Churches and Missions in South Western Germany), Stuttgart invited Surya Prakash to be its Liaison Secretary for India in 2000. The then Principal of the Seminary, O. V. Jathanna relieved him while the Diocese of Medak under B. P. Sugandhar (1993–2008) loaned the services of Surya Prakash to the EMS, Stuttgart. Surya Prakash began monitoring partnership between the EMS and the Church of South India. He was also made the Deputy General Secretary of the EMS in 2002.

While at Stuttgart, Surya Prakash was also on the Chaplaincy of St. Catherine's Church.

With the end of the term of Surya Prakash at the EMS, he returned to Medak Diocese in 2005 and was made Presbyter-in-Charge of Church of St. John the Baptist, Secunderabad.

=== Bishopric ===
The Diocese of Karimnagar had seen four Bishops since its erection post 1950. Bishops B. Prabhudass, G. B. Devasahayam, K. E. Swamidass and Sanki John Theodore provided stable leadership. John Theodore, the predecessor of Surya Prakash vacated the Cathedra on account of attaining superannuation resulting in sede vacante. The Church of South India Synod announced fresh elections to be conducted following which Surya Prakash hailing from the Diocese of Medak contested and declared elected. Then Moderator of the Church of South India, B. P. Sugandhar principally consecrated Surya Prakash as Bishop – in – Karimnagar on 26 March 2007 at the CSI-Wesley Cathedral, Karimnagar. After leading the Diocese for nearly eight years, Surya Prakash retired on attaining superannuation in 2014. The sede vacante was filled in by the Church of South India Synod which appointed K. Reuben Mark in 2015 to succeed him.

==== Lambeth Conference ====
The Church of South India (CSI)is an autonomous body in the Anglican Communion headed by the Archbishop of Canterbury, Lambeth. Bishops of the CSI also participate in the decennial Lambeth Conference. Bishop Surya Prakash attended the fourteenth Lambeth Conference held at the University of Kent, Kent from 16 July – 3 August 2008.

== Writings ==
=== Articles ===
- 1991, Sermon Preparation: Biblical Preaching, Methodological Issues and Perspectives,
- 1994, Mission of the Church in a Pluralistic Society,
- 1995, Homiletics and Preaching in India,
- 1997, Liturgy and Worship of the Church of South India,
- 2001, Towards Understanding "Ecumenism" as Mission of the Church,
- 2004, Sadhu Sundar Singh's Contribution,
- 2005, The Episcopacy in the Church of South India: A Reflection by a CSI Presbyter: My Vision of Episcopacy in the CSI,
- 2005, Church in India: Is it a visible sign of the invisible grace of God?,
- 2009, Spirit of Lent, in Mount of Olives, our Lenten journey with Jesus,

=== Books ===
==== Books written ====
- 1991, The Preaching of Sadhu Sundar Singh: A Homiletic Analysis of Independent Preaching and Personal Christianity,

==== Books edited ====
- 1997, Unite-liberate-celebrate: A Guide for the Study of the Theme,
- 2001, (with Vinod Victor and Leslie Nathaniel), Ecumenism: Prospects and Challenges,

== Leadership ==
=== Academic institutions ===
==== Senate of Serampore College (University) ====
From 2006 onwards Surya Prakash began serving as a Council member of India's first University striving for providing sound spiritual formation to the Priests of the Church in India.

==== Andhra Christian Theological College ====
Formed in 1964, the Andhra Christian Theological College, Hyderabad is a special purpose entity with major partners including the Lutherans, Baptists, Methodists and the Church of South India in which Surya Prakash represented the Diocese of Karimnagar and was ex-officio member of the Board of Governors of the College which elected him as the Chairperson of the Board for a 3-year term, 2009-2011.

==== United Theological College, Bangalore ====
In 2009, the United Theological College, Bangalore, an autonomous College affiliated to the Senate of Serampore College (University) elected Surya Prakash as its President where he provided leadership to the College with high academic credentials.

=== Inter-faith institution ===
==== Henry Martyn Institute ====
Henry Martyn Institute, Hyderabad managed by the Canadian Baptist Ministries which also has concerns at the Andhra Christian Theological College as well as along the sea coast along the Bay of Bengal through the Convention of Baptist Churches of Northern Circars elected Surya Prakash as its Chairperson of its Council in 2010 where Surya Prakash continues in that role.

=== Child-centric institution ===
==== India Sunday School Union ====
In 2002, the Coonoor based India Sunday School Union elected Surya Prakash as its President for the term 2002-2011.

=== Social research institution ===
==== Christian Institute for the Study of Religion and Society ====
The CISRS, Bangalore is a social research institution which elected Surya Prakash as its President for the term 2007-2011.

Religious titles
Preceded by S. J. Theodore; 1993-2007	Bishop - in - Karimnagar; Church of South India; 2007-2014	Succeeded by K. Reuben Mark; 2015-
Academic offices
Preceded by	Professor, United Theological College, Bangalore; 1991-2000	Succeeded by
Other offices
Preceded by Luise Plock; 1997-2000	India Liaison Secretary, Evangelical Mission in Solidarity, Stuttgart; 2000-2005	Succeeded by -
Honorary titles
Preceded by C. L. Furtado	Chairperson, Henry Martin Institute, Hyderabad; 2010-2015	Succeeded by G. Dyvasirvadam; 2015-2019
Preceded by G. Dyvasirvadam; 2003-2009	Chairperson, United Theological College, Bangalore; 2009-2012	Succeeded by G. Devakadasham; 2012-2015
Preceded by S. V. Sampath Kumar, MCI; 2005-2007	President, Christian Institute for the Study of Religion and Society; Bangalore; 2007-2011	Succeeded by V. Devasahayam; 2011-2014
Preceded by V. E. Christopher, AELC; 2007-2009	Chairperson, Board of Governors, Andhra Christian Theological College, Hyderabad; 2009-2011	Succeeded by R. R. D. Sajeeva Raju, STBC; 2011-2013
Preceded by M. Elia Peter, MCI -2002	Chairperson, India Sunday School Union; Coonoor; 2002-2011	Succeeded by Dhyanchand Carr; 2011-
