= K. Reuben Mark =

Church of South Indian bishop

The Most Rt. Rev. Dr. K. Reuben Mark, moderator of CSI
- Bishop – in – Karimnagar and Moderator of CSI Inter-diocesan Office - in - Chennai
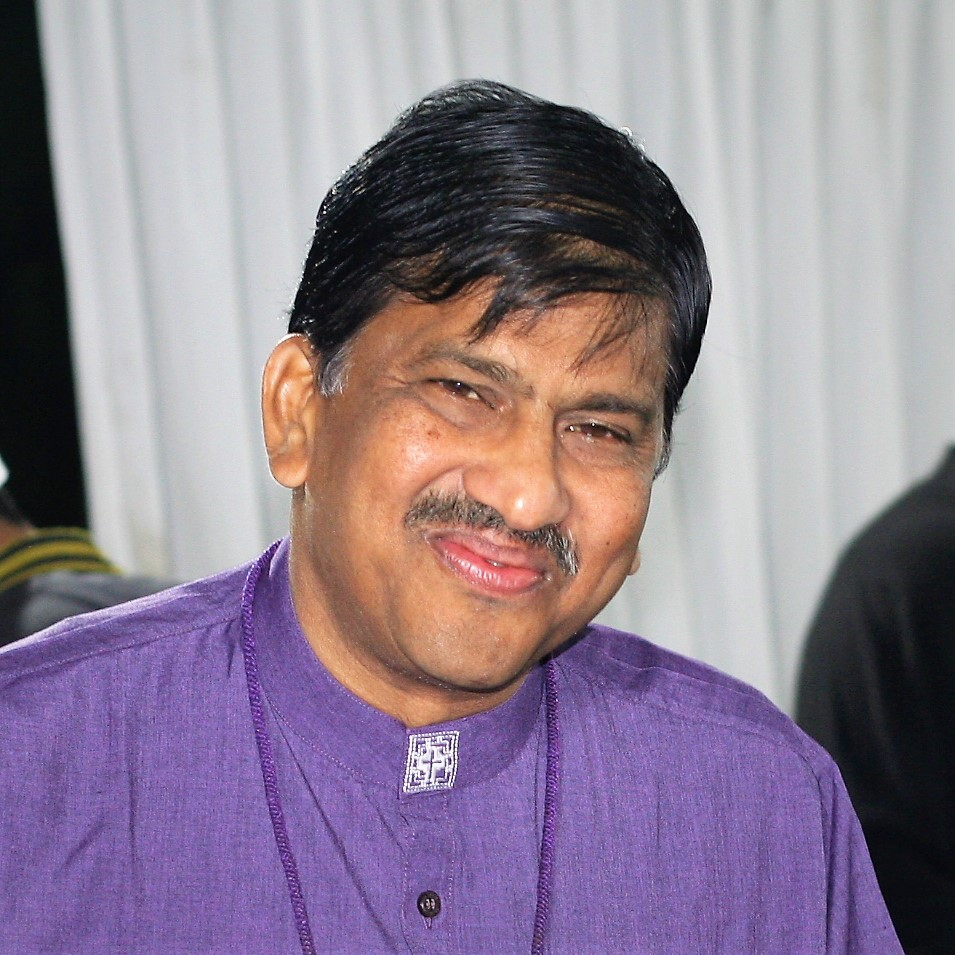
- Bishop Reuben Mark at the Protestant Regional Theologiate in Secunderabad on 1 January 2019
- Church: Church of South India (A Uniting church comprising Wesleyan Methodist, Anglican, the Church of England, Lutheran churches, and missionary societies: SPG, WMMS, LMS, Basel Mission, and CMS in India )
- Diocese: Karimnagar
- Elected: 2015
- Predecessor: Bishop P. Surya Prakash, CSI
- Successor: Incumbent
- Previous posts: Priest, Diocese of Karimnagar, Church of South India (1988–1995), Professor, Andhra Christian Theological College, Hyderabad (1995-2015)

Orders
- Ordination: 1988 by Bishop K. E. Swamidass, CSI at CSI-Wesley Cathedral, Karimnagar
- Consecration: 4 May 2015 by The Most Reverend G. Dyvasirvadam, CSI, then Moderator and Principal consecrator and The Right Reverend Thomas K. Oommen, CSI then Deputy Moderator and co-consecrator
- Rank: Bishop

Personal details
- Born: Kantipudi Reuben Mark; 29 March 1961 (age 65)
- Denomination: Christianity
- Residence: Mukarampura, Karimnagar
- Parents: Sri Shadrach
- Occupation: Priesthood
- Education: B. D. (Serampore), M. Th. (Serampore), Ph.D. (Higginbottom)
- Alma mater: United Theological College, Bangalore (Karnataka), University of Copenhagen Faculty of Theology, Copenhagen (Denmark), Sam Higginbottom Institute of Agriculture, Technology and Sciences, Allahabad (Uttar Pradesh)

Rt. Rev. Dr. K. Reuben Mark is the present moderator of church of South India and (2015 onwards) Bishop in Karimnagar and the sixth in succession and occupies the Cathedra of the Bishop placed in Karimnagar's CSI-Wesley Cathedral. Reuben Mark is currently a Council Member for the period 2015–2018 at the fully-ecumenical United Theological College, Bangalore. During the XXXVIth session of Church of South India Synod, Reuben Mark has been elected as Deputy Moderator for the triennium 2020-2023 succeeding V. Prasada Rao.

Before he assumed the ecclesiastical office of the Bishop, Reuben Mark was Professor in Homiletics from 1995 through 2015. Mark's professorship was at the Andhra Christian Theological College, affiliated to India's first University, the Senate of Serampore College (University) {a University under Section 2 (f) of the University Grants Commission Act, 1956} with degree-granting authority validated by a Danish Charter and ratified by the Government of West Bengal.

== Moderator of CSI ==
He was elected as Deputy Moderator of CSI Synod from 2020 to 2023. After Reuben Mark was the Moderator of the CSI Synod from July 2025

== Ministerial formation ==
=== Graduate ===
After the completion of graduate studies in Hanumakonda, Reuben Mark discerned his avocation towards priesthood and became a ministerial candidate of the Diocese of Karimnagar of the Church of South India, then under the bishopric of G. B. Devasahayam, CSI who took him into the Church and became his Spiritual Confessor and sent him for spiritual formation to the United Theological College, Bangalore, where he studied Bachelor of Divinity degree from 1984 to 1988 under the Principalship of the Old Testament Scholar, E. C. John, CSI and was taught by faculty that comprised G. D. Melanchthon, AELC James Carl, SALC Theodore N. Swanson, ELCA, D. N. Premnath, CSI and others. In 1988 when Reuben Mark returned to the Diocese, he was ordained in 1988/1989 by then Bishop K. E. Swamidass, CSI following which he began ministering in parishes of the Diocese of Karimnagar.

=== Postgraduate ===
In 1992, Reuben Mark was resent to the United Theological College, Bangalore to upgrade his academics and studied from 1992 to 1994 during the successive Principalships of E. C. John, CSI and Gnana Robinson, CSI taking a postgraduate degree in Master of Theology specializing in Homiletics under Professor P. Surya Prakash, CSI then Faculty Member at the United Theological College, Bangalore. Reuben Mark was awarded graduate and post-graduate degrees by the Senate of Serampore College (University) during the Registrarship of D. S. Satyaranjan, IPC.

=== Research studies ===
After a period of teaching ministry at the near-ecumenical Seminary in Secunderabad, Reuben Mark was again sent by his Bishop S. John Theodore, CSI for research studies at the University of Copenhagen Faculty of Theology, Copenhagen, Denmark where he researched from 2000 to 2004 on the theme, A Homiletical analysis of the Revival Sermons of D. G. S. Dhinakaran and its Relevance of the Dalit Perspective and later transferred himself to the Sam Higginbottom Institute of Agriculture, Technology and Sciences, Allahabad researching under the able guidance of Prof. V. K. Singh and was awarded the doctoral degree in 2009.

== Ecclesiastical ministry ==
=== Pastoral ===
After his Seminary studies, Reuben Mark was ordained as a Deacon in 1988 by then Bishop K. E. Swamidass, CSI and the following year as a Presbyter at the CSI-Wesley Cathedral in Karimnagar and began pastoring parishes within the ecclesiastical jurisdiction of the Diocese of Karimnagar until 1992 when he went to upgrade his academics in the Protestant Seminary in Bangalore. After his return from the Seminary in 1994, Reuben Mark began re-pastoring the parishes until 1995 when Bishop S. John Theodore, CSI sent him for teaching ministry to the Protestant Regional Seminary in Secunderabad.

=== Teaching ===
In 1995, Reuben Mark joined the Faculty of the Andhra Christian Theological College, Secunderabad and began teaching Practical Ministry/Homiletics at the Andhra Christian Theological College, Secunderabad from 1995 to 2015 and taught in a near-ecumenical setting comprising the Wesleyan, Methodist, Lutheran, Congregational, Baptist, and Anglican Church societies beginning with the periods of Principalship comprising the Church of South India, the Convention of Baptist Churches of Northern Circars, the Samavesam of Telugu Baptist Churches, and the Andhra Evangelical Lutheran Church notably under The Rev. R. Yesurathnam, CSI, The Rev. K. D. G. Prakasa Rao, CBCNC and D. J. Jeremiah, CBCNC, The Rev. B. J. Christie Kumar, STBC, The Rev. N. V. Luther Paul, AELC, The Rev. Ch. Vasantha Rao, CSI and The Rev. T. Mathews Emmanuel, CBCNC.

After a two-decades teaching ministry that began in 1995, Reuben Mark was recalled to the Diocese of Karimnagar by the Church of South India Synod in mid-2015 as his name was announced as Bishop-elect for the Diocese of Karimnagar resulting in his resignation from the Faculty of the near-ecumenical Protestant Regional Theologiate in Secunderabad.

=== Bishopric ===
During the period when Reuben Mark was teaching at the Seminary in Secunderabad, the Diocese of Karimnagar saw the change of at the Bishopric in 2007 following which P. Surya Prakash, CSI, Reuben Mark's Professor at Bangalore was consecrated as the fifth Bishop - in - Karimnagar who occupied the Cathedra up to 2014 until his resignation on account of superannuation resulting in sede vacante. The Church of South India Synod conducted elections for the Bishopric following which G. Dyvasirvadam, CSI, then Moderator of the Church of South India Synod announced the appointment of K. Reuben Mark as Bishop-elect for the Diocese of Karimnagar.

On 4 May 2015 the Most Reverend G. Dyvasirvadam, CSI, then Moderator principally consecrated Reuben Mark with other co-consecrator, The Right Reverend Thomas K. Oommen, CSI, then Deputy Moderator at the CSI-Wesley Cathedral, Karimnagar in the presence of Bishops of the adjoining dioceses, B. D. Prasada Rao, CSI, Eggoni Pushpalalitha, CSI Order of Sisters, V. Prasada Rao, CSI and the General Secretary of the Church of South India Synod, Daniel Sadananda, CSI. Also present were the two living patriarchs of the Diocese of Karimnagar, the Old Testament Scholar S. J. Theodore, CSI and P. Surya Prakash, CSI.

Religious titles
Preceded by Bishop V. Prasada Rao; 2017-2019	Deputy Moderator, CSI Synod, Chennai; 2020-2023	Succeeded by Incumbent
Preceded by Bishop P. Surya Prakash; 2007-2014	Bishop - in - Karimnagar, Church of South India, Karimnagar; 2015-Present	Succeeded by Incumbent
Academic offices
Preceded by The Rev. P. Joseph, STBC; 1986-1994	Professor - in - Homiletics, Andhra Christian Theological College, Secunderabad; 1995-2015	Succeeded by The Rev. A. John Prabhakar, STBC; 1999-
