= B. Prabhudass =

Anglican bishop in India

Bishop Bishop Babbili Prabhudass CSI
- Bishop
- Church: Church of South India
- Diocese: Karimnagar
- See: CSI-Wesley Cathedral, Karimnagar
- Elected: 1978
- In office: 1978-1982
- Predecessor: Position created
- Successor: G. Benjamin Devasahayam
- Previous posts: Priest, Diocese of Dornakal, Church of South India (1945-1974); Lecturer, United Theological College, Bangalore(1974-1977)

Orders
- Ordination: 1945 by Bishop Anthony Blacker Elliott
- Consecration: 1978, CSI-Wesley Cathedral, Karimnagar by The Most Reverend N. D. Ananda Rao Samuel (Principal Consecrator) and The Right Reverend Solomon Doraiswamy (Co-consecrator)
- Rank: Bishop

Personal details
- Born: Babbili (Bobbili) Prabhudass
- Died: 1996
- Buried: Christian Cemetery, Narayanguda, Hyderabad; 17.4000° N, 78.0167° E
- Denomination: Christianity
- Occupation: Priesthood
- Education: B.D. (Serampore), M. Th. (Serampore),
- Alma mater: United Theological College, Bangalore

Bishop Babbili Prabhudass (died 1996) was the first elected Bishop - in - Karimnagar Diocese of the Church of South India which was ecclesiastically bifurcated from the Diocese of Dornakal of the Church of South India in early 1978. Prabhudass led the bishopric for a period of five years from 1978 through 1982.

Prior to assuming the ecclesiastical office of the Bishop, Prabhudass was a seminary teacher from 1974 to 1977 during the principalship of the Systematic Theologian Joshua Russell Chandran at a fully ecumenical United Theological College, Bangalore, a Theologiate in Bangalore which had co-faculty drawn from the Carmelites of Mary Immaculate-Dharmaram College in Bangalore.

== Writings ==
- Personal Evangelism,
- Guide to Evangelism
- Sister Carol and the Church of South India

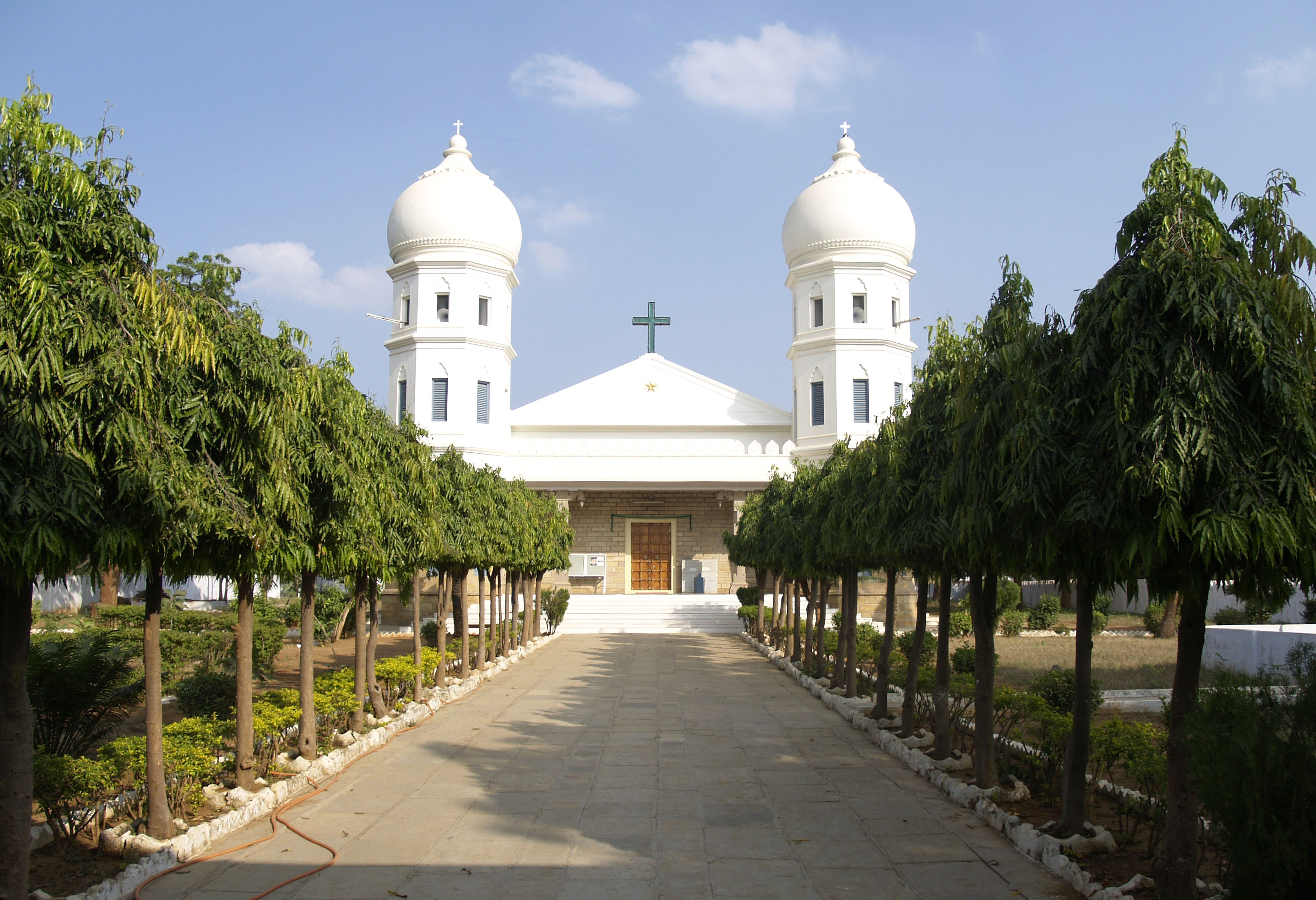
CSI-Epiphany Cathedral, Dornakal. During 1974, Prabhudass served as Cathedral Presbyter for a few months.

== Studies ==
=== Graduate ===
After Prabhudass discerned his avocation to become a Priest, the Diocese of Dornakal led by V. S. Azariah sent him for ministerial formation to the United Theological College, Bangalore, one of the affiliated seminaries of the Senate of Serampore College (University) where he pursued a spiritual course leading to Bachelor of Divinity between 1941 and 1945 during the Principalship of Max Hunter Harrison. Other companions of Prabhudass during that period who were studying at varying intervals included A. E. Inbanathan, C. Arangaden, J. R. Chandran, S. J. Samartha, B. G. Prasada Rao and others. Prabhudass was awarded the degree of B.D. during ensuing convocation of the University during the Registrarship of The Rev. C. E. Abraham.

=== Post-graduate ===
In 1951, during the bishopric of A. B. Eliott, Prabhudass was resent to the United Theological College, Bangalore for upgrading his academics where he enrolled for a postgraduate course leading to Master of Theology during 1951-1952, during the Principalship of M. H. Harrison becoming the fifth postgraduate student in the history of the College. The University awarded an M.Th. during its convocation the following year during the Registrarship of The Rev. W. W. Winfield.

Prabhudass also went for research exposure to England, during the Bishopric of P. Solomon and returned to India in 1958.

== Ecclesiastical ministry ==
Soon after Prabhudass completed his seminary studies, he was assigned pastoral roles in the Diocese of Dornakal from 1945 onwards. Prabhudass was a Seminary Teacher at the Andhra Union Theological College (AUTC), Dornakal, teaching along with Eric J. Lott. By 1959, much before the integration of the AUTC into the Andhra Christian Theological College, Rajahmundry, Prabhudass had moved out to medical ministry as a Chaplain at the CSI-Mission Hospital, Phanigiri.

During 1974 he was assigned the role of a Cathedral Presbyter of the CSI-Epiphany Cathedral, Dornakal for a short period until he was sent to teach at the United Theological College, Bangalore the same year.

=== Seminary Teacher ===
Prabhudass was a Faculty Member from 1974 to 1977 at the United Theological College, Bangalore affiliated to India's first University, the Senate of Serampore College (University) {a University under Section 2 (f) of the University Grants Commission Act, 1956} with degree-granting authority validated by a Danish Charter and ratified by the Government of West Bengal. Prabhudass was Lecturer of Pastoralia and Dean of Practical Work. and taught both graduate and post-graduate students. Prabhudass was also part of the literary circles of the college and was made a member of the editorial committee of the UTC-Gurukul Alumni Journal.

In 1975 when the United Theological College, Bangalore embarked on a fully ecumenical initiative with co-faculty made available from the Carmelites of Mary Immaculate-Dharmaram College, Bangalore, Prabhudass was also featured in the souvenir marking the inauguration of the educational partnership. During the teaching period of Prabhudass from 1974 to 1977 the candidates studying at that period comprised Christopher Asir, P. Surya Prakash, S. W. Meshack, Mani Chacko, D. N. Premnath and others from the graduate section while J. W. Gladstone, D. Dhanaraj and others hailed from the post-graduate section. Prabhudass' stint at the College coincided with the Registrarship of D. S. Satyaranjan who was the College Registrar and Lecturer - in - New Testament.

In 1977, while Prabhudass was teaching at the Theologiate in Bangalore, he was recalled to the Diocese of Dornakal led by P. Solomon as there were plans for a greater role for Prabhudass in the Diocese. Based on the communication from the Bishop, Joshua Russell Chandran Principal relieved Prabhudass in 1977 enabling him to return to the Diocese of Dornakal in September 1977.

=== Bishopric ===
==== The Diocese ====
The Diocese of Dornakal which was ecclesiastically erected in 1912 was led by Bishop V. S. Azariah right from the time of its inception until his sudden death in 1945 In the postcolonialism scenario, the geographical area of the diocese was considerably reduced during the bishopric of A. B. Eliott with the formation of new dioceses in 1947 resulting in the Diocese of Krishna-Godavari, Diocese of Rayalaseema and Diocese of Nandyal. As a result of the conversations that took place in the Church of South India Synod to further reduce the ecclesiastical jurisdiction of the Diocese of Dornakal, the Moderator, N. D. Ananda Rao Samuel announced the bifurcation of the Diocese of Dornakal as a result of which the Diocese of Karimnagar was erected on March 12, 1978 Subsequently, the CSI-Wesley Church in Karimnagar was consecrated as a Cathedral. Prabhudass was reassigned to the Diocese of Karimnagar upon bifurcation.

==== Consecration and ministry ====
With the erection of the Diocese of Karimnagar in 1978, the Church of South India Synod announced the appointment of Prabhudass to lead the newly erected diocese. N. D. Ananda Rao Samuel then Moderator of the Church of South India Synod principally consecrated Prabhudass at the CSI-Wesley Cathedral, Karimnagar as the first Bishop - in - Karimnagar in the presence of the co-consecrator, Solomon Doraiswamy, the Deputy Moderator at the CSI-Wesley Cathedral in Karimnagar and P. Solomon, the Bishop-in-Dornakal. During the bishopric of Prabhudass from 1978 to 1982, he was entitled to use the ecclesiastical prefix The Right Reverend and attended two conclaves of the Church of South India Synod,

- the seventeenth Synod held at the Madras Christian College, Tambaram from 10–14 January 1980 which elected Solomon Doraiswamy as its Moderator and I. Jesudasan as its Deputy Moderator,
- the eighteenth Synod held at Vellore from 11–15 January 1982 which elected I. Jesudasan as its Moderator and Sundar Clarke as its Deputy Moderator.

Prabhudass was part of the Synod in 1982 which voted with 2/3rds majority for the Ordination of women as Priests in the Church of South India leading to the subsequent ordination of Elizabeth Paul in 1987 as the first ordained woman Priest of the Church of South India. Incidentally, J. R. Chandran, a companion of Prabhudass, co-founded the Association of Theologically Trained Women in India which took up the issue of Ordination of women not only with the Protestant Churches in India but also with the Catholic Church heads.

After ministering for nearly 5 years in the bishopric, Prabhudass vacated the Cathedra in Karimnagar in 1982 on attaining superannuation resulting in sede vacante following which the Church of South India Synod led by I. Jesudasan, then Moderator of the Church of South India Synod appointed G. B. Devasahayam in 1982 to succeed Prabhudass.

==== Lambeth Conference ====
As Bishop - in - Karimnagar, Prabhudass attended the eleventh Lambeth Conference held at the University of Kent at Canterbury in 1978 presided by the Archbishop of Canterbury, Donald Coggan.

=== Administrator ===
Ever since Prabhudass was consecrated as a Bishop in 1978, he became an ex-officio member of the Board of Governors at the Andhra Christian Theological College, a vernacular medium Protestant Regional Theologiate in Hyderabad with near-ecumenical composition consisting of,

- the Baptists (Convention of Baptist Churches of Northern Circars and Samavesam of Telugu Baptist Churches),
- the Anglicans, the Congregationalists and the Wesleyans through the Church of South India (Dioceses of Dornakal, Karimnagar, Krishna-Godavari, Madras, Medak, Nandyal, Rayalaseema)
- the Lutherans (Andhra Evangelical Lutheran Church, Good Samaritan Evangelical Lutheran Church and South Andhra Lutheran Church),
- the Methodists (Methodist Church in India)

The theologiate in which Prabhudass was a Board Member was notable for its Old Testament scholarship throughout India as two Old Testament Scholars Victor Premasagar and G. Babu Rao were teaching at the regional theologiate at that time. Prabhudass provided the required management especially at a time when the Principalship rotated from the Church of South India to the Convention of Baptist Churches of Northern Circars due to the election of Victor Premasagar, CSI, Ph.D. (St. Andrews) as General Secretary of the Church of South India Synod in 1980 resulting in the appointment of Komaravalli David, CBCNC, Ph.D. (Edinburgh) by the Board of Governors.

== Honours ==
In 1959, the Edinburgh Medical Missionary Society reported,

(Adapted) Prabhudass has a tremendous concern for evangelism and the building up of the Church

In 2007, the Diocese of Karimnagar has named its Evangelistic Training School in memory of B. Prabhudass. In 2010, a mission focusing on the leprosy-afflicted living in the suburbs of the twin cities of Hyderabad and Secunderabad in India was instituted to the memory of Prabhudass jointly by Christ the King and the Episcopal Diocese of Fort Worth (Episcopal Church) where annual charity events are taken up for creating awareness and mobilizing resources for the mission.

Religious titles
Preceded by Position created	Bishop - in - Karimnagar, Church of South India; 1978-1982	Succeeded by G. Benjamin Devasahayam; 1982 - 1987
Preceded by R. John G. Samuel; July 1971 - August 1974	Cathedral Presbyter, CSI-Epiphany Cathedral, Dornakal; August 1974 - October 1974	Succeeded by R. John G. Samuel; November 1974 - June 1977
Honorary titles
Preceded by Position created	Member, Board of Governors, Andhra Christian Theological College, Hyderabad; 1978 - 1982	Succeeded by G. Benjamin Devasahayam; 1982 - 1987
Academic offices
Preceded by Christopher Doraisingh	Lecturer - in - Pastoralia, United Theological College, Bangalore; 1974 - 1977	Succeeded by D. D. Pitamber
