= Gone Benjamin Devasahayam =

Bishop G. B. Devasahayam CSI
- CSI-Bishop – in – Karimnagar
- Native name: మహ గనుడు గొనె బెంజమిన్ దేవసహాయం అయ్యాగారు
- Church: Protestant Church of South India (comprising Wesleyan Methodist, Congregational and Anglican missionary societies - SPG, WMMS, LMS, CMS, and the Church of England)
- Diocese: Karimnagar
- See: CSI-Wesley Cathedral, Karimnagar
- Elected: 1982
- In office: 1982 - 1987
- Predecessor: B. Prabhudass
- Successor: K. E. Swamidass
- Previous posts: Pastor, Diocese of Medak, Church of South India (1956-1982)

Orders
- Ordination: by Frank Whittaker, CSI-Bishop - in - Medak
- Consecration: 1982, CSI-Wesley Cathedral, Karimnagar by The Most Reverend I. Jesudasan, Moderator, The Right Reverend Sundar Clarke, Deputy Moderator
- Rank: Bishop

Personal details
- Born: Gone Benjamin Devasahayam; August 23, 1925 Telangana
- Died: August 20, 1996 (aged 70) Secunderabad, Telangana
- Buried: CSI-Wesley Cemetery, Bhoiguda, Secunderabad, Telangana
- Denomination: Christianity
- Parents: Smt. Lydia (Mother) and Sri G. Benjamin (Father)
- Occupation: Priesthood
- Education: B.D., M.A.,
- Alma mater: United Theological College, Bangalore, McCormick Theological Seminary, Chicago

Bishop G. B. Devasahayam (born 23 August 1925; died 20 August 1996) was the second elected CSI-Bishop - in - Karimnagar Diocese of the Church of South India who occupied the Cathedra from 1982 through 1987 placed in the CSI-Wesley Cathedral in Karimnagar Town in Telangana, India

Devasahayam hailed from the Protestant CSI-Diocese of Medak which was predominantly a Wesleyan Methodist congregation initiated by the Wesleyan Methodist Missionary Society which unionized itself into the Church of South India that was inaugurated on 20 September 1947 at the CSI-St. George's Cathedral, Chennai. After Devasahayam discerned his avocation towards priesthood, then Bishop, Frank Whittaker sent him to the Protestant Regional Theologiate in Bangalore for ministerial formation during 1952–1956 after which Devasahayam was ordained and began ministering in the ecclesiastical jurisdiction of the Diocese of Medak during the successive bishoprics of Frank Whittaker, Eber Priestley, H. D. L. Abraham and B. G. Prasada Rao. After nearly 25 years of pastoral ministry, Devasahayam contested the bishopric in the adjoining Diocese of Karimnagar and was declared elected by the Church of South India Synod resulting in his appointment as the second CSI-Bishop - in - Karimnagar where he began his bishopric from 1982 and continued to build up the ministry and evangelism in the diocese following the precedent set by his predecessor B. Prabhudass.

In 1987, after shepherding the bishopric for nearly six years, Devasahayam announced his resignation from the ecclesiastical office of the Bishop citing health reasons and vacated the Cathedra resulting in sede vacante. The sudden turn of events took the ecclesiastical circles by storm making the Church of South India Synod led by Moderator I. Jesudason and Deputy Moderator P. Victor Premasagar to huddle and take steps to fill the sede vacante caused by the resignation of Devasahayam.

== Ministerial formation ==
=== Graduate ===
Devasahayam pursued spiritual studies at the United Theological College, Bangalore affiliated to India's first University, the Senate of Serampore College (University) {a University under Section 2 (f) of the University Grants Commission Act, 1956} with degree-granting authority validated by a Danish Charter and ratified by the Government of West Bengal. Devasahayam studied at the seminary for four years from 1952 to 1956 during the Principalships of Max Hunter Harrison and Joshua Russell Chandran leading to award of Bachelor of Divinity during the annual convocation of the university held in 1957 during the Registrarship of William Stewart.

=== Postgraduate ===
After a decade and half of ecclesiastical ministry, the Diocese of Medak led by H. D. L. Abraham sent Devasahayam to the McCormick Theological Seminary, Chicago in 1971 to upgrade his academics where he enrolled for a Master of Arts programme leading to the award of the M.A. by the seminary.

== Ecclesiastical ministry ==
=== Pastorate ===
After a 4-year ministerial formation at the Protestant Regional Theologiate in Bangalore during 1952–1956, Devasahayam was ordained as a Pastor by Frank Whittaker, the first CSI-Bishop - in - Medak following which he began to minister parishes in the ecclesiastical jurisdiction of the Diocese of Medak pastoring in Secunderabad, Nizamabad, Dudgaon in Telangana region of the erstwhile Andhra Pradesh state.

=== Bishopric ===
In 1982 when the first CSI-Bishop - in - Karimnagar, B. Prabhudass vacated the Cathedra on attaining superannuation, the Church of South India Synod announced the conduction of fresh elections to fill in the sede vacante, following which Devasahayam from the adjoining Diocese of Medak was declared elected and appointed to the bishopric leading to his consecration in 1982 by I. Jesudasan then Moderator of the Church of South India Synod who principally consecrated Devasahayam as CSI-Bishop - in - Karimnagar in the presence of Sundar Clarke, the Deputy Moderator and co-consecrator.

As Bishop, Devasahayam took part in the biennial conclaves of the Church of South India Synods of 1984 and 1986 held at Secunderabad and Trivandrum respectively.

In 1987, Devasahayam vacated the Bishopric on account of health reasons resulting in an unexpected sede vacante very much similar to the present papacy of Pope Benedict XVI who resigned citing health reasons in 2013. The Church of South India Synod filled the sede vacante by announcing the appointment of K. E. Swamidass, who incidentally was a companion of Devasahayam during his seminary studies in Bangalore.

== Governor ==
As CSI-Bishop - in - Karimnagar, Devasahayam was ex officio member of the Board of Governors of the near-ecumenical Andhra Christian Theological College, a Protestant Regional Theologiate situated in Hyderabad comprising a few Protestant societies, the Wesleyans, Methodists, Lutherans, Baptists, Congregationalists, and the Anglicans. Devasahayam represented the Karimnagar Diocese which was again a Wesleyan congregation from 1982 through 1987 on the Board of Governors coinciding with the successive cycle of Principalships held by Convention of Baptist Churches of Northern Circars and the Samavesam of Telugu Baptist Churches led by The Rev. K. David, Ph.D. (Edinburgh) and The Rev. S. Joseph, D.Th. (Serampore) respectively.

== Retirement and death ==
After Devasahayam sought early retirement from the bishopric in 1987 on account of health reasons, he returned to the Diocese of Medak and resided in Secunderabad. In 1992 Devasahayam took part in the consecration of the Old Testament Scholar S. John Theodore as the fourth CSI-Bishop - in - Karimnagar along with his predecessor B. Prabhudass as well as K. E. Swamidass his successor.

Devasahayam continued to minister in the Diocese of Medak until his death on 20 August 1996.

Religious titles
Preceded by B. Prabhudass, CSI; 1978-1982	CSI-Bishop - in - Karimnagar; Church of South India; 1982-1987	Succeeded by K. E. Swamidass, CSI; 1987-1992
Other offices
Preceded by B. Prabhudass, CSI; 1978-1982	Member, Board of Governors; Andhra Christian Theological College, Hyderabad; 1982-1987	Succeeded by K. E. Swamidass, CSI; 1987-1992
