= Sanki John Theodore =

Bishop Emeritus Sanki John Theodore CSI
- Bishop Emeritus – in – Karimnagar
- Church: Christian
- Diocese: Karimnagar
- See: Church of South India
- In office: 1992-2007
- Predecessor: K. E. Swamidass
- Successor: P. Surya Prakash
- Previous posts: Pastor, Diocese of Karimnagar, Church of South India (1970–1992); Visiting Professor of Old Testament, Andhra Christian Theological College, Hyderabad(1980-1984)

Orders
- Consecration: by The Most Reverend Bird Ryder Devapriyam, Moderator, The Right Reverend Jason S. Dharmaraj, Deputy Moderator

Bishop Emeritus Sanki John Theodore was the fourth Bishop-in-Karimnagar Diocese of the Church of South India.

== Studies ==
John Theodore's spiritual formation was at the United Theological College, Bangalore affiliated to India's first University, the Senate of Serampore College (University) {a University under Section 2 (f) of the University Grants Commission Act, 1956}with degree-granting authority validated by a Danish Charter and ratified by the Government of West Bengal where he studied the graduate degree of Bachelor of Divinity from 1966-1970.

After a two-year ministerial work, Theodore again studied from 1972-1974 enrolling for a postgraduate degree of Master of Theology specializing in Old Testament under E. C. John G. M. Butterworth, and Gerhard Wehmeier, working out a dissertation entitled The concept of creation in the Book of Deutero-Isaiah at the United Theological College, Bangalore. Theodore was part the pioneer group of postgraduate students who specialised in Old Testament comprising A. P. Chacko, Basil Rebera, G. Babu Rao, Nitoy Achümi, and Timotheas Hembrom. Theodore's graduate and post-graduate degrees were awarded by the University during the Registrarship of Chetti Devasahayam.

== Ministry and Teaching ==
Ever since his return in 1970 from the Protestant Seminary in Bangalore, Theodore began to minister parishes in the Dornakal Diocese of the Church of South India until its bifurcation resulting in the creation of Karimnagar Diocese of the Church of South India in 1978 on account of which he was reassigned to the ecclesiastical Diocese of Karimnagar.

== Bishopric ==
In 1992, the bishopric of Karimnagar led by K. E. Swamidass fell vacant due to his resignation on attaining superannuation. In the resulting elections that were conducted by the Church of South India Synod, the name of John Theodore came into the panel of three probable Bishops for Karimnagar. Bird Ryder Devapriam then Moderator of the Church of South India Synod announced the appointment of Sanki John Theodore as the fourth Bishop-in-Karimnagar. Bird Ryder Devapriyam principally consecrated John Theodore as Bishop - in - Karimnagar at the CSI-Wesley Cathedral, Karimnagar in the presence of Jason S. Dharmaraj, the Deputy Moderator, Victor Premasagar, Bishop - in - Medak, Bishop T. B. D. Prakasa Rao from the Diocese of Krishna-Godavari and three patriarchs of Karimnagar Diocese, B. Prabhudass, G. B. Devasahayam and K. E. Swamidass.

During Theodore's bishopric from 1992-2007, he attended the thirteenth Lambeth Conference presided by George Carey then Archbishop of Canterbury. In 2007, Theodore retired on attaining superannuation causing a sede vacante. The Church of South India Synod announced the appointment of P. Surya Prakash of the adjoining Diocese of Medak.

Religious titles
Preceded by K. E. Swamidass; 1987-1992	Bishop - in - Karimnagar; Church of South India; 1992-2007	Succeeded by P. Surya Prakash; 2007-2014
Other offices
Preceded by K. E. Swamidass; 1987-1992	Member, Board of Governors; Andhra Christian Theological College, Hyderabad; 1992-2007	Succeeded by P. Surya Prakash; 2007-2014
