= United Theological College, Bangalore =

Protestant seminary in India renowned for Dalit Theology

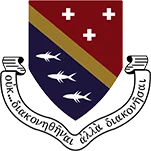
- Motto: SICUT FILIUS HOMINIS NON VENIT MINISTRARI SED MINISTRARE ET DARE ANIMAM SUAM REDEMPTIONEM PRO MULTIS
- Motto in English: Even as the Son of man is not come to be ministered unto, but to minister and to give his life a redemption for many.
- Type: Seminary
- Established: 1910; 116 years ago
- Affiliations: Senate of Serampore College (University); Serampore – 712201; West Bengal
- Director: The Right Reverend Dr. Royce Manoj Victor, CSI
- Principal: The Rev. A. Israel David, CSI
- Academic staff: 10+
- Location: 63, Miller's Road, Benson Town, Bengaluru 560 006, Karnataka, India; 12°59′45″N 77°35′56″E
- Website: http://www.utc.edu.in/

United Theological College (UTC) is an ecumenical Mainline Protestant seminary founded in 1910. It is situated in the southern city of Bangalore in the state of Karnataka in South India and is affiliated with the Senate of Serampore College (University). It is an ecumenical institution in Bangalore, recognized as the principal center for the development and practice of Dalit theology.

== The College ==
Since 1976, it has been granted the status of an autonomous college under Senate of Serampore. The college has welcomed world leaders. Mahatma Gandhi visited it in 1927 and declared, To live the gospel is the most effective way…I can say that the life of service and uttermost simplicity is the best preaching. India Post released a centenary commemorative stamp in honor of the United Theological College (UTC) on 8 July 2011.

== Motto ==
UTC's motto comes from Matthew 20:28 in the Vulgate: SICUT FILIUS HOMINIS NON VENIT MINISTRARI SED MINISTRARE ET DARE ANIMAM SUAM REDEMPTIONEM PRO MULTIS which translates as "Even as the Son of man is not come to be ministered unto, but to minister and to give his life a redemption for many". It is sometimes condensed to Not to be Served but to Serve. In the University emblem the motto is in Greek (not in Latin): οὐ... διακονηθῆναι ἀλλὰ διακονῆσαι

== Courses offered ==
The UTC was granted autonomy in the year 1976 by the Senate of Serampore College (University). The following are the courses offered by the College:

- Diploma in Women's Studies
- Certificate Course in Christian Studies
- Diploma for Proficiency in Counselling
- Diploma in Young Men's Christian Association Professional Secretaryship
- Bachelor of Divinity, B.Div.
- Master of Theology, Th.M.
- Doctor of Theology, Th.D.

Succession of Old Testament Faculty at UTC, Bangalore

Full-time faculty

- 1931-1958/1963-1965, The Rev. ^{✝}M. H. Harrison, Th.M. (ANTS),
- 1959–1993, The Rev. E. C. John, Dr.theol. (Heidelberg),
- 1963–1969, The Rev. Samuel Amirtham, Dr.theol. (Hamburg),
- 1972–1978, The Rev. G. M. Butterworth, Ph. D. (London),
- 1973–1978, The Rev. Gerhard Wehmeier, Dr.theol. (Basel),
- 1979–1994, The Rev. Theodore N. Swanson, Ph. D. (Vanderbilt),
- 1979-1985, The Rev. Rudolf Ficker, Dr. Theol. (Heidelberg),
- 1984–1987, The Rev. D. N. Premnath, Th. D. (GTU),
- The Rev. James Vijayakumar, D. Th. (Serampore),
- The Rev. D. Jones Muthunayagom, D. Th. (Serampore),
- 1993–2000, The Rev. Gnana Robinson, Dr.theol. (Hamburg),
- The Rev. Jules Francis Gomes, Ph. D. (Cantab.),
- The Rev. K. Jesurathnam, Ph. D. (Edinburgh),
- The Rev. J. R. John Samuel Raj, Dr.theol. (Hamburg)
- 2016-The Rev. Laila L-Vijayan, D.Th. (Serampore)
- 2017–The Rev. Ch. Vasantha Rao, Dr.theol. (Hamburg)
- 2022-The Rev. R. Jeeva Kumar, D.Th. (Serampore)

Visiting Faculty

- 1957, The Rev. Norman Henry Snaith,
- 1968, The Rev. Victor Premasagar, Ph.D. (St.Andrews),
- 1979, The Rev. Klaus Koch, Dr.theol. (Heidelberg),
- 1986, The Rev. John Emerton, M.A., (Oxon.),
- 1994, The Rev. Martin Krause, Dr.theol. (Hamburg),
- 1994, The Rev. Donata Doerfel, Dr.theol. (Hamburg),
- 1994–1996, The Rev. Henning Graf Reventlow, Dr.theol. (Göttingen),
- 1995–1996, The Rev. Ed Noort, Dr.theol. (Göttingen),
- 2007–2010, The Rev. Byron E. Shafer, Ph.D., (Harvard),
- 2007, The Rev. de:Friedemann W. Golka, Ph.D., (Oxon.),

== Exchange programs ==
The UTC has exchange programs with the Theological Faculty of the University of Basel Switzerland and the Divinity School of the University of Edinburgh, Scotland. It has a Memorandum of Understanding signed by Revd Dr O V Jathanna and Prof Kenneth Brown with the University of Edinburgh wherein a post-graduate student can study a semester in Bengaluru.

== Publications ==
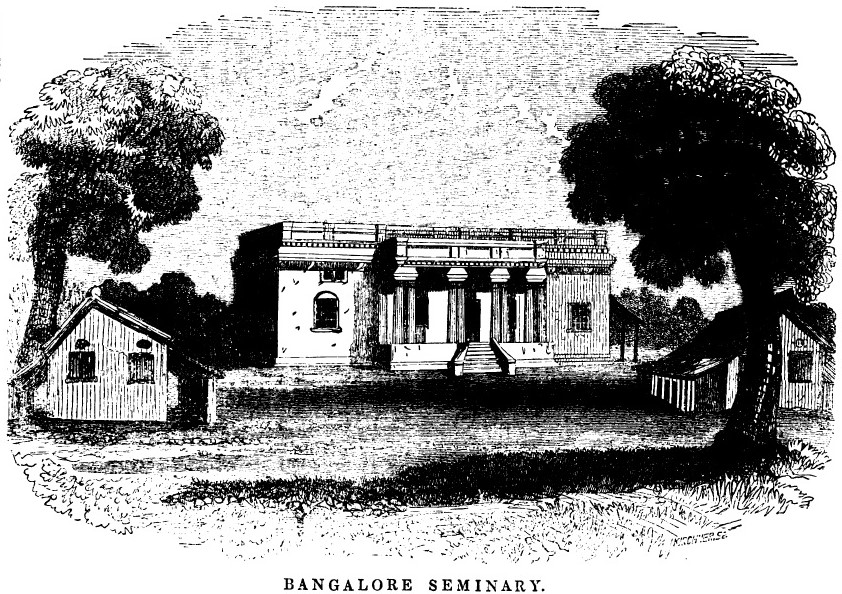
Bangalore Seminary (1843) From the 'Evangelical Magazine and Missionary Chronicle: Vol XXI' (p.193). The London Mission Seminary was established early 19th Century, located at the beginning of Mission Road. This has since been demolished and the land is part of the Mitralaya School Campus

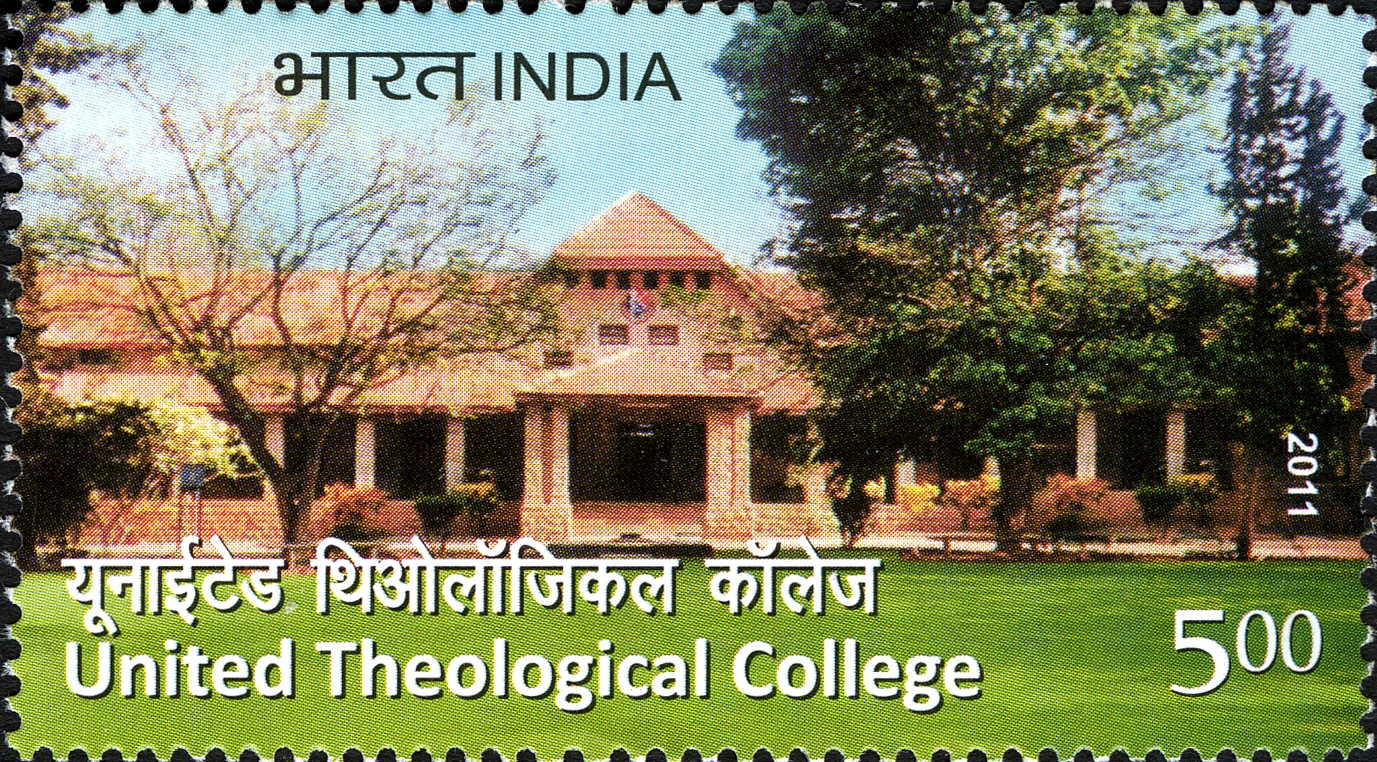
United Theological College on a 2011 stamp of India

- Masihi Sevak, a pastoral magazine with three releases in a year.
- Hymns of the Tamil Śaivite Saints an English Translation of the Tiruvacakam, by Francis Kingsbury and GE Phillips (edited by Fred Goodwill)

== Campus life ==
The college had been a recipient of prizes from the Mysore Horticultural Society, Bengaluru for well-maintained gardens and lawns. Good environment for study purpose.

== Library ==
The college has a large theological library including 200-year-old palm leaf manuscripts. The United States Embassy awarded a grant for preservation of these rare palm leaf manuscripts in 2006.

== Present Faculty ==
Present Faculty at the United Theological College with subjects taught
Faculty Name	Gen der	Domicile	Highest Degree	Alma mater	University
Discipline: Old Testament
The Rev. D. J. Muthunayagom, CSI	M	Tamil Nadu	D.Th.	Missions Academy, Hamburg (Germany)/ SATHRI, Bangalore	Serampore
The Rev. K. Jesurathnam, STBC	M	Andhra Pradesh	Ph.D.	New College, Edinburgh (Scotland)	Edinburgh
The Rev. J. R. John Samuel Raj, CSI	M	Kerala	Dr. Theol.	Missions Academy, Hamburg (Germany)	Hamburg
Discipline: New Testament
The Rev. J. G. Muthuraj, CSI	M	Tamil Nadu	Ph.D.	University of Durham, Durham (England)	Durham
The Rev. J. Jeyakumar, MCI	M	Tamil Nadu	M.Th.	UTC, Bangalore	Serampore
The Rev. Johnson Thomaskutty	M	Kerala	Ph.D.	Radboud Universiteit Nijmegen (Holland)	Nijmegen
The Rev. Dexter S. Maben, CSI	M	Karnataka	Dr. Theol.	Theological Seminary Bethel (Kirchliche Hochschule Bethel), Bielefeld (Germany)	Bethel
Discipline: Theology and Ethics
The Rev. R. Sahayadhas, IELC	M	Tamil Nadu	D.Th.	UTC, Bangalore	Serampore
The Rev. George Zachariah, MMTSC	M	Kerala	Ph. D	Lutheran School of Theology, Chicago (United States)	LSTC
The Rev. Allan Samuel Palanna, CSI	M	Karnataka	Ph.D.	University of Kent, Canterbury (England)	Kent
The Rev. Mervin Shinoj Boas, CSI	M	Kerala	Ph. D	Lutheran School of Theology, Chicago (United States)	LSTC
Discipline: History of Christianity
The Fr. M. O. John, MOSC	M	Kerala	D. D.	University of Vienna, Vienna (Austria)	Vienna
Discipline: Mission and Ecumenicism
The Prof. Rev. Dr. P.T. George, University of Birmingham	M	United Kingdom	Ph.D.	University of Birmingham, Heidelberg (Germany)	United Kingdom
Rev. Sr. Rani Joseph Mary Sruthi, SND	F	Karnataka	Ph.D.	Pontifical Urban University, Rome (Italy)	Urban
The Rev. Gudrun Löwner, EKD	F	Germany	Ph.D.	Heidelberg University, Heidelberg (Germany)	Heidelberg
Discipline: Christian Ministry
Dr. Nalini Arles^{Laity}	F	Karnataka	Ph.D.	New College, Edinburgh (Scotland)	Edinburgh
Dr. Joseph George^{Laity}	M	Kerala	Th.D.	Candler School of Theology, Atlanta (United States)	Emory
The Rev. Santosh S. Kumar, CSI	M	Kerala	D.Th.	Melbourne College of Divinity, Melbourne (Australia)	Divinity
Discipline: Women's Studies
Dr. Lalrinawmi Ralte^{Laity}	F	Mizoram	D.Min., D.Th.	Episcopal Divinity School, Cambridge (United States)/ SATHRI, Bangalore	Serampore
Discipline: Communication
The Fr. Jerry Kurian, MJSOC	M	Kerala	M.Th.	UTC, Bangalore	Serampore
Discipline: English
Ms. Geetha Basappa^{Laity}	F	Karnataka	M.A.		

== Succession of Administrators ==
Academic administrators who have led the seminary have been designated Principal.

Tenure	No.	Names of Administrators at UTC, Bangalore	Earned academic credentials (highest degree)
1910–1911	I.	The Rev. ^{✝}James Mathers, LMS, OBE,	B. D.
1911–1924	II.	The Rev. ^{✝}L. P. Larsen, DMS,	M.A.,
1924–1930	III.	The Rev. ^{✝}D. S. Herrick, ABCFM	M.A.,
1930–1931	IV.	The Rev. ^{✝}W. J. T. Small, WMMS	M.A. (Cantab.),
1931–1936	V.	The Rev. ^{✝}W. H. Thorp, WMMS	B.A. (London),
1936–1937	VI.	The Rev. ^{✝}George Parker, LMS	B. D.
1937–1954	VII.	The Rev. ^{✝}M. H. Harrison, ABCFM	Th.M. (Andover),
1954–1983	VIII.	The Rev. ^{✝}J. R. Chandran, CSI	S.T.M. (Union),
1983–1993	IX.	The Rev. ^{✝}E. C. John, CSI	Dr. Theol. (Heidelberg),
1993–2000	X.	The Rev. ^{✝}Gnana Robinson, CSI	Dr. Theol. (Hamburg),
2000–2008	XI.	The Rev. O. V. Jathanna, CSI	Dr. Theol. (Basel),
2008–2009	XII.	The Rev. S. I. Selvanayagam, CSI	D. Th. (Serampore),
2009–2017	XIII.	The Rev. J. R. Samuel Raj, CSI	Dr. Theol. (Hamburg)
2017–2025	XIV.	The Rev. Ch. Vasantha Rao, CSI	Dr. Theol. (Hamburg)
2025–	XV.	The Rev. A. Israel David, CSI	D. Th. (Serampore)

== Notable people ==
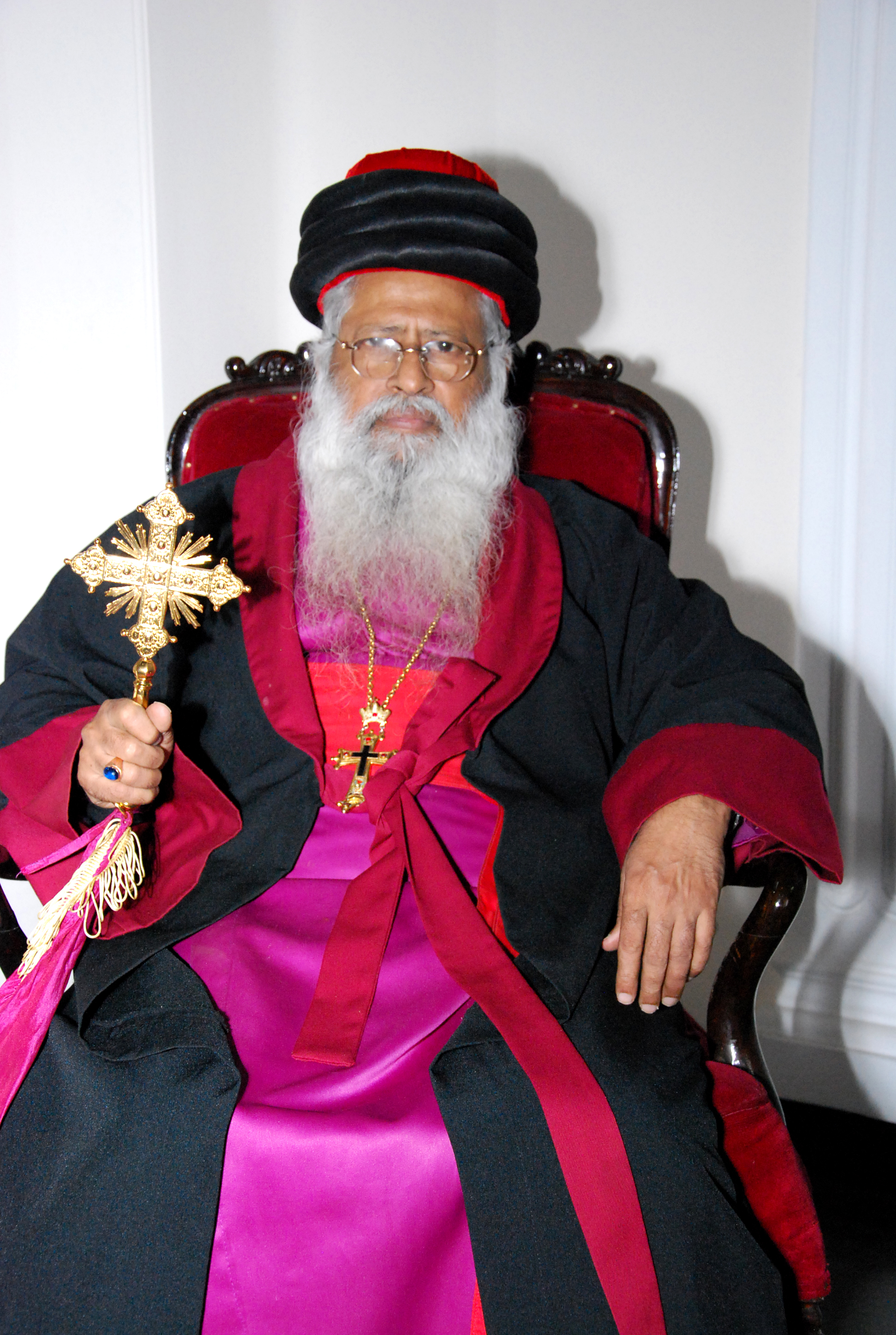
Metropolitan Mar Aprem Mooken specialized in History of Christianity

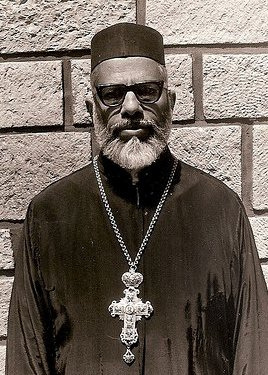
Father V. C. Samuel a specialist in Christology

Pastor Lynn de Silva who struck parallels between Christianity and Buddhism and devised Lynn de Silva's theology

Notable alumni with course undertaken and years of study
Name	Course	Years	Congre- gation	Domicile
Hospet Sumitra	B.D.	1910–13	CSI	Andhra Pradesh
Premaka Gurushantha	B.D.	1912–16	CSI	Karnataka
Juhanon Mar Thoma	B.D.	1917–22	MMTSC	Kerala
Emani Sambayya	B.D.	1928–32	CNI	Andhra Pradesh
D. T. Niles	B.D.	1929–34	CMC	Sri Lanka
H. D. L. Abraham	B.D.	1934–37	CSI	Karnataka
P. Solomon	B.D.	1936–40	CSI	Telangana
A. E. Inbanathan	B.D.	1939–43	CSI	Tamil Nadu
C. Arangaden	B.D.	1940–44	CSI	Kerala
B. G. Prasada Rao	B.D.	1941–45	CSI	Telangana
B. G. Prasada Rao	M.Th.	1953–56	CSI	Telangana
S. J. Samartha	B.D.	1941–45	CSI	Karnataka
B. Prabhudass	B.D.	1941–45	CSI	Telangana
B. Prabhudass	M.Th.	1951–52	CSI	Telangana
J. R. Chandran	B.D.	1941–44	CSI	Tamil Nadu
J. R. Chandran	M.Th.	1944–45	CSI	Tamil Nadu
K. Devasahayam	M.Th.	1942–43	AELC	Andhra Pradesh
Philipose Mar Chrysostom	B.D.	1943–46	MMTSC	Kerala
Lynn de Silva	B.D.	1943–47	CMC	Sri Lanka
Solomon Doraiswamy	B.D.	1944–46	CSI	Tamil Nadu
Alexander Mar Thoma	B.D.	1945–48	MMTSC	Kerala
D. J. Ambalavanar	B.D.	1945–50	CSI	Sri Lanka
B. E. Devaraj	Special course	1946–47	CNI	Andhra Pradesh
Gaddala Solomon	B.D.	1949–52	STBC	Andhra Pradesh
Gaddala Solomon	Refresher course in Hebrew language	1972–73	STBC	Andhra Pradesh
N. D. Ananda Rao Samuel	B.D.	1950–53	CSI	Andhra Pradesh
V. C. Samuel	B.D.	1950–53	MOSC	Kerala
Victor Premasagar	B.D.	1950–54	CSI	Telangana
E. C. John	B.D.	1951–54	CSI	Kerala
G. B. Devasahayam	B.D.	1952–56	CSI	Telangana
K. E. Swamidass	B.D.	1952–56	CSI	Telangana
C. D. Jathanna	B.D.	1952–55	CSI	Karnataka
Samuel Amirtham	B.D.	1953–56	CSI	Kerala
Joseph Mar Thoma	B.D.	1953–57	MMTSC	Kerala
John Philipose	B.D.	1955–58	CSI	Kerala
K. V. Mathew	M.Th. (OT)	1957–58	MMTSC	Kerala
Gnana Robinson	B.D.	1957–60	CSI	Tamil Nadu
Gnana Robinson	M.Th. (OT)	1961–63	CSI	Tamil Nadu
D. P. Shettian	B.D.	1960–61	CSI	Karnataka
R. Yesurathnam	B.D.	1963–67	CSI	Telangana
R. Yesurathnam	M.Th.	1969–72	CSI	Telangana
R. Yesurathnam	D.Th.	1978–82	CSI	Telangana
G. T. Abraham	B.D.	1962–66	CSI	Andhra Pradesh
C. L. Furtado	B.D.	1962–64	CSI	Karnataka
Arvind P. Nirmal	B.D	1962- 65	CNI	Maharashtra
Kallarakkal Abraham George	M.Th. (OT)	1963–65	MOSC	Kerala
Wesley Ariarajah	B.D.	1963–66	MCSL	Sri Lanka
Mar Aprem Mooken	M.Th.	1964–66	ACE	Kerala
B. P. Sugandhar	B.D.	1964–68	CSI	Telangana
Philipose Mar Eusebius	B.D.	1964–66	MMTSC	Kerala
R. S. Sugirtharajah	B.D.	1965–69	MCSL	Sri Lanka
R. S. Sugirtharajah	M.Th. (NT)	1973–75	MCSL	Sri Lanka
S. John Theodore	B.D.	1966–70	CSI	Telangana
S. John Theodore	M.Th. (OT)	1972–74	CSI	Telangana
H. S. Wilson	B.D.	1967–70	CSI	Karnataka
Basil Rebera	B.D.	1967–71	Laity	Sri Lanka
Basil Rebera	M.Th. (OT)	1971–73	Laity	Sri Lanka
Elizabeth Paul	B.D.	1967–74	CSI	Tamil Nadu
Timotheas Hembrom	B.D.	1968–70	NELC	Jharkhand
Timotheas Hembrom	M.Th. (OT)	1971–73	NELC	Jharkhand
D. I. Hans	B.D.	1968–71	CSI	Karnataka
D. I. Hans	M.Th.	1977–79	CSI	Karnataka
P. J. Lawrence	B.D.	1968–71	CSI	Andhra Pradesh
J. Paul Rajashekar	B.D.	1968–71	IELC	Tamil Nadu
J. W. Gladstone	B.D.	1969–72	CSI	Kerala
J. W. Gladstone	M.Th.	1972–74	CSI	Kerala
D. W. Jesudoss	M.Th.	1970–71	TELC	Tamil Nadu
Sydney Salins	B.D.	1970–74	CSI	Karnataka
Sydney Salins	M.Th. (NT)	1980–82	CSI	Karnataka
D. Dhanaraj	B.D.	1970–74	CSI	Tamil Nadu
D. Dhanaraj	M.Th. (OT)	1976–78	CSI	Tamil Nadu
D. S. Satyaranjan	M.Th. (NT)	1971–73	IPC	Andhra Pradesh
G. Babu Rao	M.Th. (OT)	1971–73	CBCNC	Andhra Pradesh
G. Babu Rao	Doctoral studies	1980–82	CBCNC	Andhra Pradesh
Nitoy Achümi	M.Th. (OT)	1971–73	NBCC	Nagaland
Christopher Asir	B.D.	1971–75	CSI	Tamil Nadu
John Sadananda	B.D.	1972–74	CSI	Karnataka
P. Surya Prakash	B.D.	1972–76	CSI	Telangana
P. Surya Prakash	M.Th. (NT)	1980–82	CSI	Telangana
D. N. Premnath	B.D.	1973–77	CSI	Andhra Pradesh
M. Mani Chacko	B.D.	1975–79	CSI	Kerala
M. Mani Chacko	M.Th. (OT)	1981–83	CSI	Kerala
K. David Udayakumar	B.D.	1977–81	SALC	Andhra Pradesh
K. David Udayakumar	M.Th. (NT)	1982–85	SALC	Andhra Pradesh
Ravela Joseph	M.Th.	1978–80	STBC	Andhra Pradesh
Ravela Joseph	Doctoral studies	1983–84	STBC	Andhra Pradesh
G. Devakadasham	M.Th.	1979–81	CSI	Tamil Nadu
N. Sam Yesudhas	M. Th.	1979-81	CSI	Tamil Nadu
G. D. V. Prasad	M.Th. (OT)	1979–81	CSI	Andhra Pradesh
Roger Gaikwad	M.Th.	1981	MCI; PCI	Maharashtra
G. Dyvasirvadam	M.Th.	1982–84	CSI	Andhra Pradesh
G. Dyvasirvadam	Doctoral studies	1992	CSI	Andhra Pradesh
Chuauthuama	B.D.	1983-1987	PCI	Mizoram
Evangeline Anderson-Rajkumar	B.D.	1983–87	ALC	Tamil Nadu
Evangeline Anderson-Rajkumar	D.Th.	1992–97	ALC	Tamil Nadu
K. Reuben Mark	B.D.	1984–88	CSI	Telangana
K. Reuben Mark	M.Th.	1992–94	CSI	Telangana
Paulson Pulikottil	M.Th. (OT)	1986-88	IPC	Kerala
Ch. Victor Moses	M.Th. (OT)	1986–88	AELC	Andhra Pradesh
Annie Watson	B.D.	1987–91	CSI	Karnataka
B. D. Prasada Rao	M.Th.	1987–89	CSI	Andhra Pradesh
H. R. Cabral	M.Th.	1988–90	CSI	Karnataka
H. R. Cabral	D.Th.	1992–97	CSI	Karnataka
Jonadob Nathaniel	M.Th. (NT)	1988–90	CSI	Tamil Nadu
Daniel Sadananda	M.Th. (NT)	1988–90	CSI	Karnataka
A. C. Solomon Raj	B.D.	1988–92	CSI	Telangana
A. C. Solomon Raj	M.Th.	1998-01	CSI	Telangana
