= Diocese of Karimnagar of the Church of South India =

Diocese of the Church of South India in Telangana, India

Diocese of Karimnagar

Location
- Ecclesiastical province: Church of South India

Information
- Cathedral: Wesley Cathedral

Current leadership
- Bishop: K. Reuben Mark

Website
- CSI Karimnagar Diocese

The Diocese of Karimnagar is a diocese of Church of South India in Telangana state of India.The diocese is one among the 22 dioceses of Church of South India, a United Protestant denomination.

== History of the Diocese ==
The Wesleyan Methodist Missionaries from England began working since 1879 in the Districts of Hyderabad, Medak, Nizamabad, Karimnagar and Nalgonda. As a result of their mission work churches were established along with Schools and Hospitals. After the formation of Church of South India in the year 1947, Karimnagar and Nalgonda areas from Medak were annexed to the Dornakal Diocese. Diocese of Karimnagar was formed in the year 1978 by bifurcating Dornakal Diocese. The churches in the district of Karimnagar and Nalgonda were bifurcated from Dornakal Diocese along with Warangal District to form the new diocese.

== Bishops ==
=== Before the formation of the Church of South India ===
- V. S. Azariah
- A. B. Eliott (1945–1955)

=== After the formation of the Church of South India before bifurcation ===
- A. B. Eliott (1945–1955)
- P. Solomon (1955–1978)

=== Post-bifurcation from the Diocese of Dornakal ===
- B. Prabhudass (1978–1982)
- G. Benjamin Devasahayam (1982–1987)
- K. E. Swamidass (1987–1992)
- S. John Theodore (1992–2007)
- P. Surya Prakash (2007–2014)
- K. Reuben Mark (2015-)

== Notable Churches in the Diocese ==
- Wesley Cathedral, Karimnagar

The CSI Wesley Cathedral church was built by the missionaries in the year 1978. Wesley Cathedral has been completely renovated and rededicated in 2011. The cathedral celebrated its centenary in 2012.

- CSI Wesley Church, Jagital
- CSI Church Panigiri

== Institutions Under the Diocese ==
- Bishop Prabhudass Memorial Evangelistic Training School, Jagtial
- Bishop K.E.Swamidass Laity Training Institute, Karimnagar
- C.S.I High School, Karimnagar
- C.S.I High School, Alier
- C.S.I Mission High School, Parkal
- C.S.I Lant Memorial ITI, Karimnagar
- C.S.I Primary School, Jagtial
