= Matthew Vellanickal =

Indian theologian

- Born: 25 September 1934; Arpookara, Kerala
- Education: 1964 - Pontifical Urbaniana University, Rome (L.Th.); 1970 - Pontifical Biblical Institute, Rome (S.S.D.)
- Church: Syro-Malabar Catholic Church
- Title: Reverend Father Doctor

Matthew Vellanickal (born 25 September 1934) is a New Testament scholar and a vicar general of the Syro-Malabar Catholic Archdiocese of Changanassery.

== Studies and work ==
Matthew Vellanickal pursued doctoral studies in the discipline of New Testament at the Pontifical Biblical Institute, Rome under the Belgian New Testament Exegete Ignatius de la Potterie and was awarded the doctoral degree in 1970 based on his dissertation The Divine Sonship of Christians in the Johannine Writings. He was a member of the Pontifical Biblical Commission from 1978 to 1984, and President of the Paurastya Vidyapitham (Pontifical Oriental Institute of Religious Studies), Kottayam from 1982 to 1994. He was also Professor of New Testament at St. Thomas Apostolic Seminary, Kottayam.

== Writings ==
- The Divine Sonship of Christians in the Johannine Writings
- Studies in the Gospel of John
- Biblical prayer experience
- Church: Communion of Individual Churches - Biblico-Theological Perspectives on the Communion Ecclesiology of Vatican II
- Biblical Theology of Evangelization
- Biblical Theology of the Individual Churches
- Biblico-Theological Foundations of Ecclesial Identity
- Ecclesial Communion: A Biblical Perspective
- Evangelization in the Johannine Writings
- The Christian Community as a Bearer of the Good News
- The Pauline Doctrine of Christian Sonship
- Understanding of Evangelization in the context of present-day India

Professional and academic associations
| Preceded by Victor Premasagar, CSI; 1974-1975 | President, Society for Biblical Studies in India; 1976-1977 | Succeeded by K. David, CBCNC; 1978-1979 |
Academic offices
| Preceded by | Professor of New Testament, St. Thomas Apostolic Seminary, Kottayam, Kerala | Succeeded by |
