= Lynn de Silva's theology =

Lynn de Silva's theology began at an early stage in Lynn de Silva's ministry, when his interest in Buddhism and its culture began to increase. He believed that the credibility of Christianity depended on its ability to relate to Buddhism, which was the faith of the majority of the Sri Lankan population. His objective was to develop a richer appreciation of the similarities between Buddhism and Christianity, in particular, to communicate the Christian message in a manner that the Sri Lankan culture understood, and to construct a theology that is focused towards the Buddhist cultural environment. To this end, he used Buddhist concepts to communicate Christian beliefs in a language understood from the Buddhist context, and he aimed at extending Christian theology with Buddhist concepts in order to gain a more thorough understanding of Christianity. In his book The Problem of the Self in Buddhism and Christianity, de Silva states the following:

There is a growing body of opinion within Christianity that its theology is shop-soiled and needs drastic revision in order first, to re-root it in the basic biblical teaching, secondly, to bring it into harmony with new insights and modes of thought coming from other faiths, ideologies and modern science and thirdly, to relate it to social realities... What I have attempted is to help this process of transformation in Christian thinking. However, theological thinking in order to be meaningful and relevant must be contextual. The context of this book is Buddhism.

To obtain the necessary background in Sri Lankan Buddhist practices, de Silva consulted reputed Buddhist monks and scholars, visited Buddhist places of worship, and consulted written sources on Sri Lankan Buddhism. Although most of his studies were completed in English, he took a special effort to master Sinhalese and the Sri Lankan culture. Furthermore, he became proficient in Pali, the language of the Buddhist scriptures. His findings eventually led to his most popular work, the book titled Buddhism: Beliefs and Practices in Sri Lanka (de Silva 1974). In the early 1980s, this book was considered unparalleled as an introduction to Buddhism in Sri Lanka, and also considered the most complete, thorough and sensitive book on Buddhism in Sri Lanka, resulting in it generally being recommended by professors and monks as a standard book on Buddhist practices in Sri Lanka.

== Tilakkhana ==
Lynn de Silva believed that the construction of a theology that is focused towards the Buddhist cultural environment "must begin with living existential realities and not with metaphysical speculations," and that such a theology should attempt at understanding man's existence from concrete experiences common to mankind. In Tilakkhana, or the three characteristics – anicca, dukkha and anattā – of all existence discovered by the Buddha in his diagnosis of the human predicament, de Silva finds the appropriate starting point for such a theology.

Although Tilakkhana is a Buddhist concept, de Silva finds that Tilakkhana is not a concept alien to the Bible. In his search for Tilakkhana in the Bible, de Silva finds anicca and dukkha in a number of Biblical passages, such as Psalms 90, that speak of the transitoriness, suffering, and anxiety of human life. This leads him to believe that "the polarity of conflict between being and the possibility of non-being that lies at the core of human existence, the mood of anxiety, the finitude and precariousness of man's life, is a familiar theme that runs through the Bible." Furthermore, de Silva finds that, although there is no systematic exposition of Tilakkhana in the Bible as found in Buddhist texts, the undertones of anicca, dukkha and anattā do occur together in the Bible.

== Anattā-Pneuma ==
In 1979, de Silva released his most outstanding contribution to Theology, the book titled The Problem of the Self in Buddhism and Christianity (de Silva 1979), which has since been cited extensively (e.g.,) and attracted reviews from international journals (e.g.,). In this book, de Silva compares the biblical notion of "the soul" (pneuma) or "the self," with the Buddhist doctrine of "no soul" (anattā) or "no self." Contrary to popular belief, de Silva shows that modern Christian scholarship does not support the notion of a soul as an immortal entity separate from the body. He argues that such a misconception arose as a consequence of the translation of the Bible into Greek:

The idea of an immortal soul is certainly a firmly established traditional belief of Christians, but it is a belief that has entered Christian thinking through the influence of Greek Philosophy and is altogether alien to what the Bible teaches about the nature and destiny of man.... It can be confidently said that in the Bible, there is no notion of an immortal soul existing independently as an eternal, immutable, and perdurable entity, which inhabits the body and escapes it at death. It is this notion that Buddhism rejects in no uncertain terms, and on this point there is a fundamental agreement between Buddhism and biblical theology, so much so that it is possible to state the biblical view of man making use of Buddhist categories of thought.(de Silva 1979)

Based on his observation, de Silva shows how the Buddhist doctrine of anattā is complementary to the Christian notion of personal identity – pneuma. He distinguishes that, while pneuma focuses on man as a relational entity, anattā focuses on man as an isolated entity. Furthermore, de Silva infers that if we do consider anattā to be real in Buddhism or Christianity, pneuma must also be real for Nibbāna or the Kingdom of God to be a positive ideal. In conclusion, de Silva proposes the compound notion anattā-pneuma as a solution for the problem of the self in Buddhism and Christianity; this new notion, he states, conforms with the anattā Buddhist-Christian belief in the non-existence of an immortal soul inhabiting the body, but also lays more emphasis on social relationships by means of pneuma.

In his review of de Silva's book The Problem of the Self in Buddhism and Christianity, Joseph Kitagawa argues that de Silva is too narrow in his analysis of the anatta doctrine; he claims that a better analysis would have been for de Silva to take into consideration the broader implication of the anattā doctrine, and to challenge the very basis of Greek philosophy which had influenced much of Christian theology. Furthermore, Kitagawa argues that de Silva could have entertained the possibility that Theravada Buddhism might look for Ultimate Reality more readily in the Mahayana Buddhist tradition, rather than turning towards Christianity. In Donald Mitchell's analysis of the same book by de Silva, he states that a better framework for dialogue with Hindu traditions could be allowed if de Silva considered an expanded hermeneutical circle that includes a more positive notion of soul that is compatible with the biblical understanding of man. By doing so, Mitchell argues, de Silva would be able to "include inherently valuable insights from the Christian tradition on the nature of man."

From the evangelical theologians, Tissa Weerasinghe believed that de Silva needs to put more emphasis on the "glaring disharmony" between Christianity and Buddhism that their differing views on the biblical notion of soul suggest. In relation to de Silva's treatment of this notion, Dyrness states that insights into the biblical picture of human life apart from God cannot be found by a dialogue with Buddhism, but by Christian Asians carefully considering the Scriptures and their own Asian setting. A similar perspective is taken by Lim et al., who insist that de Silva should communicate the Christian message to the Buddhists, instead of giving Buddhist meanings to Christian concepts and harmonising in a syncretistic way the concepts belonging to the two religions. In a publication that aims at an evangelical approach to religions and cultures, Yung interprets de Silva's contribution as not so much an able exercise in dialogue, but, rather, a brilliant Christian apologetic, addressed to Theravada Buddhists.

== Salvation ==
With his inclusivistic view on religion in the early stages of his career, Lynn de Silva believed that salvation does not only apply to Christians, but also to other religions. He maintains that while Christians can use Christ as their means for salvation, other religions can use their own means for salvation:

This does not mean that only those who consciously acknowledge the Lordship of Jesus Christ as known in history will be saved and all others will be lost eternally. The Christ-event is the classic instance of salvation, but not the exclusive event in history through which God has mediated his salvation to mankind. The other events, although they do not measure up to the classic event, are in no way insufficient means of salvation. Each event, like the Christ event, is a promise and guarantee of the salvation that is to be in the end-time.(de Silva 1967b)

Later in his life, de Silva developed more of a pluralistic view on religion, believing that neither of the two religions is superior to the other. This change of view is evident in his posthumously published article Buddhism and Christianity Relativised, in volume 9 of the Dialogue journal.

In Tilakkhana, de Silva finds a foundation for a constructive dialogue with Buddhists regarding the role of Jesus as saviour in Christianity. Buddhists overcome Tilakkhana by turning attention away from the self and focusing their attention towards anattā; therefore, the ultimate goal to which Buddhism is directed towards – Nibbana – can be achieved by self effort. This, de Silva believes, is one of the "deepest dilemmas in Buddhism," leading him to ask the question "What is the self that denies the self and at the same time asserts that it alone can save the self?" He infers that "to deny the self and to affirm self-sufficiency is a contradiction."

He argues that it is the Bible that takes the anattā characteristic of Tilakkhana seriously. With Jesus as saviour, de Silva believes a perfect solution for man's tragic condition in Tilakkhana can be found in Christianity; in particular, he shows that the role of Jesus as saviour supports his conviction that a person cannot save himself through self effort. He goes on to say that by emphasising the anattā characteristic, Christians could make an attempt to convince Buddhists of the necessity of divine help in attaining Nibbana.

Despite doctrinaire Buddhists' claims, de Silva shows that the need for a saviour has found expression in Buddhism in numerous ways. By examining his own culture, de Silva goes on to show that the majority of lay Buddhists in Sri Lanka view the Buddha as a living saviour, who is able to confer blessings to mankind.

In her Ph.D. thesis containing a chapter on de Silva's work, Damayanthi Niles claims that there is a problem with de Silva's argument in relation to salvation, in that it "reconciles the exclusive Christ-event and the inclusive vision of God's salvific plan purely on Christian terms," and that it does not take the "religious visions and commitments of other faiths seriously." Furthermore, she argues that de Silva's understanding of salvation, as found in his paper Non-Christian Religions and God's Plan of Salvation (de Silva 1967b), borrows a religious idea from other religions and uses the idea to make Christianity more palatable to other religions and to Christians sensitive to pluralism.

== Anattā and God ==
Lynn de Silva shares John Hick's view that although different religions use different concepts such as God and Buddha, all these concepts refer to the same Ultimate Reality. Regarding this commonality between religions, de Silva writes:

Man is related to a power or reality 'above' or 'beyond' himself, i.e., beyond his material life. This reality is referred to in different religions as Brahma, Allah, 'Buddha'--life, or even Nirvana. Religion is therefore an expression of man's relation to the limits of his own existence. That ultimate frontier of human existence, in whichever way religions may conceive it, is what the word 'God' signifies.

He acknowledges that the Buddhist way for obtaining peace and insight without the need for belief in God constitutes a "novel and powerful challenge to Christianity." However, he maintains that the concept of God could still become a fruitful area for dialogue with Buddhism. For such dialogue to take place, he argues that a reorientation of Christian thought about God is necessary, in order to eliminate some of their base notions of God and to help them come to a more thorough understanding of what they mean by "God."

In relation to the place of "God" in Buddhism, de Silva contributed to the development of the Dharma-God idea, in which what the Buddha rejected is interpreted as being the notions that were considered during the Buddha's generation to be associated with God, rather than the Ultimate Reality that the term "God" or "Brahman" signified. Regarding the concept of Dharma (or Dhamma) in Buddhism, de Silva states that if there is nothing beyond the Dhamma, then the Dhamma must be the supreme Being in whom the highest ideals are acknowledged and actualised.

His main contribution toward overcoming the incompatibility between Buddhism and Christianity in regards to the concept of God is in arguing that an understanding of the Biblical treatment of anattā can find a place for "God" in Buddhism. In particular, he argues that Christianity carries the concept of anattā into its logical conclusion, and that "it is in relation to the reality of God that the reality of anattā can be meaningful".

== Thanatology ==
In the last few years before his death, de Silva focused his study towards the study of human death, namely, the field of Thanatology. His quest was motivated mainly by the death of his wife Lakshmi in December 1980, but also by his curiosity about the meaning of resurrection. With this frame of mind, de Silva studied the beliefs and practices of people with respect to death, such as the phenomenon of mediums, with help from Buddhist exponents of reincarnation. Although traces of his findings were found in his last writings, de Silva died before completing his study, in May 1982. His last findings were published posthumously by his friend and colleague, Fr. Aloysius Pieris S.J., in the paper Buddhism and Christianity Relativised, which appeared in volume 9 of the Dialogue journal.

In this paper, de Silva talks about "Life Beyond Death," and writes that theologians should not ignore data about the Parapsychology. He urges that evidence about the paranormal is compelling, and that it is a field that merits careful study. Regarding Purgatory, de Silva states in this paper that the Hindu/Buddhist view, where Ultimate Reality is reached through a process of purification through liberation from self and elevation to stages of spiritual development, is more acceptable than the belief in a single life on earth and an everlasting hell or heaven after death. Furthermore, he insists that the Hindu/Buddhist view conforms to modern theological as well as psychical research. In agreement with the Hindu/Buddhist view, de Silva regards Purgatory to be a place of cleansing, which ultimately makes a person ready for eternal life in Heaven:

We need to purge the doctrine of Purgatory of its traditional imagery and restate the truth underlying it. Basically, purgatory symbolizes the process of purging the distoring elements in a person; it is a process of cleansing by which a person is fitted for his ultimate destiny. The kind of "suffering" as a penalty for wrongs done, but as a painful surrender of the ego-centered self, the losing of self, the discovery that one is anattā in the process of finding one's true being. Purgatory is a process of spiritual death and rebirth, of progressive sanctification, a process which begins in this very life.

In his final Dialogue journal publication Reflections on Life in the Midst of Death, de Silva explains that it is sin which has created the illusion of self in man, and that it is this illusion that drives man towards self-possession and selfishness. He states that belief in self alienates man from Ultimate Reality as well as from one another, giving rise to dukkha or feelings of despair, emptiness and meaninglessness, when man is in the midst of death. He stresses on the importance of love in overcoming this clinging to self, and maintains that love is non-selfish by nature, and that love involves responsibility and venturing beyond one's own interests:

Separation which is the result of sin can be overcome according to the Christian understanding, only by love, for love is the reunion of life with life, the reconciliation of the self with God and with itself. Love transforms death into meaningful destiny...when we love someone, we do not merely love him but we love the love that is in him and this is eternal life in action. Such love has an eternal quality. Nothing can destroy it. Love is stronger than death.

Tissa de Alwis, in his Th.D. thesis studying the works of Lynn de Silva, argues that "de Silva's attempt to harmonise Rebirth, Purgatory, and an intermediate state, which is a kind of a continuum in which one passes from a near state of annihilation to the closest union with God, is inconsistent with the radical picture of Biblical anatta"; furthermore, de Alwis states that de Silva "fails to define lostness in the final sense and slides into an unrestricted universalism."

== Publications ==
=== Books ===
- de Silva, Lynn A. (1950), Purana Darshanaya (Sinhalese), Colombo, Sri Lanka: M.D. Gunasena
- de Silva, Lynn A. (1961), Lukge Subaranchi Pradipaya (Sinhalese), Colombo, Sri Lanka: Committee for Publication of Christian Literature
- de Silva, Lynn A. (1964), Creation, Redemption and Consummation in Buddhist and Christian Thought, Chiang Mai, Thailand: Thailand Theological Seminary
- de Silva, Lynn A. (1968), Reincarnation in Buddhist and Christian Thought, Colombo, Sri Lanka: Christian Literature Society, ASIN B0006C3NP6
- de Silva, Lynn A. (1974), Buddhism: Beliefs and Practices in Sri Lanka, Colombo, Sri Lanka: Wesley Press, ASIN B0000CQC8X
- de Silva, Lynn A. (1979) [First edition published by the Study Center for Religion and Society, Colombo, 1975], The Problem of the Self in Buddhism and Christianity (2nd ed.), London: Macmillan Press, ISBN 0-333-23660-2
- de Silva, Lynn A. (1980), Lakdiva Pariharaika Buddhagama (Sinhalese), Colombo, Sri Lanka: Ecumenical Institute for Study and Dialogue

=== Book chapters ===
- de Silva, Lynn A. (1967a), Singh, Herbert Jai (ed.), "Buddhist-Christian Dialogue", Inter-Religious Dialogue, Bangalore: The Christian Institute for the Study of Religion and Society
- de Silva, Lynn A. (1971), S. J. Samartha (ed.), "Some Issues in Buddhist-Christian Dialogue", Dialogue Between Men of Living Faiths: Papers Presented at the Consultation Held at Ajaltoun, Lebanon, March 1970, Geneva: WCC: 47–58
- de Silva, Lynn A. (1975), "[Contributed material to chapter on Buddhism]", in Brown, David A. (ed.), A Guide to Religions, S.P.C.K. and United Society for Christian Literature for the Theological Education Fund, pp. 123–154, ISBN 978-0-281-02849-8
- de Silva, Lynn A. (1976), Elwood, Douglas J. (ed.), "The Problem of the Self in Buddhism and Christianity", What Asian Christians Are Thinking: A Theological Source Book, Quezon City: New Day Publishers of the Christian Literature Society of the Philippines: 105–118
- de Silva, Lynn A. (1976), "Sri Lanka: Theological Construction in a Buddhist Context", in Anderson, Gerald H. (ed.), Asian Voices in Christian Theology, Maryknoll: Orbis Books, pp. 37–52, ISBN 0-88344-016-4
- de Silva, Lynn A. (1978), Amirtham, Samuel (ed.), "An Existential Understanding of the Doctrine of Creation in the Context of Buddhism", A Vision for Man: Essays on Faith, Theology and Society: In Honour of Joshua Russell Chandran, Madras: Christian Literature Society: 78–91
- de Silva, Lynn A. (1979a), Carter, John Ross (ed.), "Christian Community within Communities", Religiousness in Sri Lanka, Colombo: Marga Institute: 273–300
- S. J. Samartha; de Silva, Lynn A., eds. (1979b), Man in Nature: Guest or Engineer? A Preliminary Enquiry by Christians and Buddhists into the Religious Dimensions in Humanity's Relation to Nature, Colombo, Sri Lanka: The Ecumenical Institute for Study and Dialogue [in cooperation with the WCC, Geneva], pp. 16–23
- de Silva, Lynn A. (1980), "Christian Reflection in a Buddhist Context", in Fabella, Virginia (ed.), Asia's Struggle for Full Humanity: Towards a Relevant Theology: Papers from the Asian Theological Conference, January 7–20, 1979, Wennappuwa, Sri Lanka, Maryknoll, NY: Orbis Books, pp. 96–107, ISBN 0-88344-015-6
- de Silva, Lynn A. (1980), Francis, T. Dayananda (ed.), "Dialogue in the Context of Sri Lanka Buddhism", New Approaches to Interfaith Dialogue, Uppsala: Church of Sweden Mission: 89–102
- de Silva, Lynn A. (1982), Jathanna, Constantine D. (ed.), "The theological significance of people of other faiths", Dialogue in Community: Essays in Honour of S. J. Stanley, Mangalore: Karnataka Theological Research Institute: 31–45
- de Silva, Lynn A. (1992), Francis, T. Dayananda; Balasundaram, F. J. (eds.), "Dialogue in the Context of Sri Lanka Buddhism", Asian Expressions of Christian Commitment: A Reader in Asian Theology, Madras: Christian Literature Society: 394–406

=== Papers ===
- de Silva, Lynn A. (1952), Premaoushadaya (Sinhalese), Colombo, Sri Lanka: Liberty Press
- de Silva, Lynn A. (1952), Premaye Rahasa (Sinhalese), Colombo, Sri Lanka: Salvation Army Press
- de Silva, Lynn A. (1957), Deva Vishvasaya (Sinhalese), Colombo, Sri Lanka: Committee for the Publication of Christian Literature
- de Silva, Lynn A. (1957), Belief in God, Colombo, Sri Lanka: Committee for the Publication of Christian Literature
- de Silva, Lynn A. (1961), Than, U. Kyaw (ed.), "The Biblical Understanding of Man and of Man in Society in Relation to Buddhism", A Consultation on Buddhist-Christian Encounter, Rangoon. [Reprinted in Cyclostyled form by Study Center, Sri Lanka, 1964]
- de Silva, Lynn A. (1961), Than, U. Kyaw (ed.), "The Christian Solution to the Problem of Man in Relation to Buddhism", A Consultation on Buddhist-Christian Encounter, Rangoon. [Reprinted in Cyclostyled form by Study Center, Sri Lanka, 1964]
- de Silva, Lynn A. (1964), Bauddha Jatika Balavegaya and the Search for the Historical Jesus, Colombo, Sri Lanka
- de Silva, Lynn A. (1966), Why can't I save myself? The Christian Answer in Relation to Buddhist Thought, Colombo, Sri Lanka: The Christian Study Centre
- de Silva, Lynn A. (1967b), Hayward, Victor E. W. (ed.), "Non-Christian Religions and God's Plan of Salvation", Study Encounter, 2, 3, WCC: 61–67
- de Silva, Lynn A. (1967c), Hayward, Victor E. W. (ed.), "Relevant Areas of Dialogue with Buddhists", Study Encounter, 2, 3, WCC: 79–80
- de Silva, Lynn A. (1967d), "The Buddhist challenge and the Christian response", Logos, 2, 8, Ecumenical Institute for Study and Dialogue: 1–16
- de Silva, Lynn A. (1968), Potter, Philip (ed.), "Good News of Salvation to the Buddhist", International Review of Missions, 288, 57 (228), WCC: 448–458, doi:10.1111/j.1758-6631.1968.tb01996.x
- de Silva, Lynn A. (1969), The Cross and the Bodhi Tree, Wesley Press
- de Silva, Lynn A. (1970), Why believe in God? The Christian Answer in Relation to Buddhism, Colombo, Sri Lanka: The Christian Study Centre
- de Silva, Lynn A. (1971), Small, Walter J. T. (ed.), "Encounter with Buddhism", A History of the Methodist Church in Ceylon, Colombo, Sri Lanka: 570–579
- de Silva; Lynn A., eds. (1972), Dialogue Between Men of Living Faiths: statements by Buddhists, Hindus, Christians, Muslims, Colombo: Wesley Press, for the Study Center
- de Silva, Lynn A. (1975), Brown, David A. (ed.), "Buddhism", A Guide to Religions: Study Guide No. 12, London: S.P.C.K.
- de Silva, Lynn A. (1976), Peton, David M. (ed.), "Dialogue [Part of a talk delivered at the Fifth Assembly of the World Council of Churches, Nairobi]", Breaking Barriers, London: S.P.C.K.
- de Silva, Lynn A. (1977), "Dialogue: A Matter of Necessity [Also in French as: "Le dialogue n'est plus un choix, Mais Une Necessite", in Volume 3 of Mensuel]", One World, 23, Colombo, Sri Lanka: WCC: 10–11
- de Silva, Lynn A. (1979c), Emergent Theology in the Context of Buddhism, Colombo, Sri Lanka: Ecumenical Institute for Study and Dialogue
- de Silva, Lynn A. (1980), Elwood, Douglas J. (ed.), "Emergent Theology in the Context of Buddhism", Asian Christian Theology: Emerging Themes, Philadelphia: Westminster John Knox: 220–238
- de Silva, Lynn A. (1982), "Reflections on Life in the midst of Death [Presented at Department of Faiths and Ideologies (DFI) of the World Council of Churches in Bali, Indonesia in December 1981]", Dialogue, 10, Colombo, Sri Lanka: Ecumenical Institute for Study and Dialogue: 4–17
- de Silva, Lynn A. (c. 1960), "Buddhism and Christianity", Encyclopedia of Buddhism, Sri Lanka
- Corless, Roger J.; de Silva, Lynn (1992), "Christians Learning About Buddhist Neighbors [Published posthumously]", Occasional Paper #6, Office of Ecumenical and Interfaith Relations, Presbyterian Church

=== Newspaper and magazine articles ===
- de Silva, Lynn A. (October 5, 1971), "Dialogue Between Faiths", The Ceylon Daily, Sri Lanka
- de Silva, Lynn A. (March 26, 1978), "Many Mansions", The Sunday Observer, Sri Lanka
- de Silva, Lynn A. (September–October 1981), "Glimpses of life beyond death", The Ceylon Churchman, Sri Lanka

=== Dialogue journal ===
Following is a list of editorials and article edits in the Dialogue journal by Lynn de Silva.

Old series (September 1961 – April 1973)
Title	Number	Page	Month	Year
From Diatribe to Dialogue (Editorial)	1	1	September	1963
Comments and Criticisms on Dr. K.N. Jayathilake's article "Can the Buddhist Theory of Rebirth be Proved"	1	14	September	1963
Mexico 1963 (Editorial)	2	23	January	1964
B.J.B. and the Search for the Historical Jesus (letter)	2	38	January	1964
Living on the Christian–Buddhist Frontier (Editorial)	3	45	June	1964
The Problem of Suffering: The Christian Answer in the Light of Buddhist Thought	4	75	October	1964
The Gospel in Relation to the Buddhist view of History	5	110	February	1965
The Problem of the Self – The Christian Solution in Relation to Buddhist Thought	6	123	July	1965
The Look in the Eye (Editorial)	7	139	November	1965
"The Girl was Born"	8	180	March	1966
The Validity of Empirical Evidence in Reincarnational Stories	8	182	March	1966
Biogenesis versus Reincarnation	8	185	March	1966
Is Buddhism Atheistic?	9	193	July	1966
How do we know God?	9	199	July	1966
Is God a Person?	9	202	July	1966
Rebirth — The Critic's Reply	9	206	July	1966
Alternate Theories to the Theory of Reincarnation	9	209	July	1966
Beyond Tolerance (Editorial)	10	213	November	1966
Christian Religions and God's Plan of Salvation	11	246	April	1967
Pistis and Saddhā	12	281	September	1967
The Christian Attitude to Buddhism	13	7–12	December	1967
Christian Attitude to Buddhism: A Reply	13	19–24	December	1967
Faith and Authority (Editorial)	14	317	February	1968
Three Open Letters to the Chairman of the Buddhist Symposium: on Faith, Authority & Omniscience	15	91	July	1968
Towards an Indigenous Theology (Editorial)	16	29	November	1968
The Doctrine of Creation	16	31	November	1968
A Parable (Editorial)	17	54	March	1969
Gautama's Search for the Ultimate (God)	17	63	March	1969
Dharma as the Ultimate Reality	17	67	March	1969
Buddhism, Christianity and the Death of God	18	76	August	1969
Theistic Development in Buddhism	19	85	December	1969
Dialogue and Mission	20,21	95	June	1970
Dialogue and Mission	20,21	107	June	1970
"Beirut" over Radio Ceylon	22	132	October	1970
Worship of the Buddha Image	25	167	December	1972
Relic Worship and the cult of the Bodhi Tree	26	195	December	1972

New series (January 1974 – January 1981)
Title	Volume	Number	Page
What is Dialogue (Editorial)	1	1	1
The Debate of the Century: The Panadura Vade	1	1	17
HolyWorldlines (Editorial)	2	1	1
The Meaning of Religion in Sri Lanka Today: A Christian View	2	1	12
Can the Mind Exist apart from the Brain?	2	2	76
Anattā and God	2	3	106
Freedom from Teutonic Captivity (Editorial)	3	1	1
Concord (Editorial)	3	2	43
Turn to "Community" as the Focus for Dialogue	4	1,2	1
The Understanding and Goal of Dialogue	4	1,2	3
Proselytism	4	1,2	37
Religious Dimensions in Humanity's Relation to Nature (Christian Scriptural Insights)	5	1	19
Rethinking Theology in the Context of Buddhism	6	1,2	53
Living in a Pluralistic World (Editorial)	6	3	83
Every Religion has Its Jealousies (Editorial)	7	1	1
Monks and the Asian Reality (Editorial)	7	2	47
Dialogue Creative Transformation	8	1,2,3	1
Buddhism and Christianity Relativised	9	1,2,3	73
Reflections on Life in the Midst of Death	10	1	4

=== De Silva as subject ===
- de Alwis, Tissa Brian (1982). Christian-Buddhist Dialogue in the Writings of Lynn A. de Silva (Th.D. thesis). Andrews University.
- Dornberg, Ulrich (1992), "Lynn A. de Silva", Searching Through the Crisis: Christians, Contextual Theology and Social Change in Sri Lanka in the 1970s and 1980s, Colombo: Center for Society and Religion: 137–140
- Balasundaram, Franklyn J. (1994), The Prophetic Voices of Asia, vol. 2, Colombo: Center for Society and Religion, pp. 107–115
- de Silva, Lynn (1998), Mit Buddha und Christus Auf dem Weg (An Anthology of Six Major Writings of Lynn de Silva), translated by Moerschbacher, Marco; Höhensteiger, Petrus, Freiburg: Herder
- Niles, Damayanthi Mercy Arulratnum (1998). Religion and the Christian Faith in South Asia: A Critical Enquiry into the Writings of Hendrik Kraemer, Lynn de Silva & M. M. Thomas with Regard to the use of Understandings of Religion in the Theological Task (Ph.D. thesis). University of Chicago.
