= Max Hunter Harrison =

The Reverend Max Hunter Harrison, ABCFM Old Testament Exegete
- Born: 24 December 1893; Victoria, Illinois
- Died: 20 February 1985 (aged 91); Newton, Massachusetts
- Education: B. A. (Knox); B. S. T. (ANTS); M. Th. (ANTS); M. Ed. (Harvard); Ph. D. (Columbia
- Alma mater: Knox College, Galesburg, Illinois (1911-1913); Andover Newton Theological School, Newton, Massachusetts (1913-1917); Harvard Divinity School, Cambridge, Massachusetts (1916-1917); Union Theological Seminary (New York City) (1926-1928)
- Years active: 1918–1985 (67 years)
- Religion: Christianity
- Ordained: 21 June 1918, West Newbury
- Offices held: Principal, United Theological College, Bengaluru (1937-1954)
- Title: The Reverend Doctor

Max Hunter Harrison (24 December 1893 – 1986) was the Principal of the United Theological College (Bangalore), the only autonomous College under the nation's first University, the Senate of Serampore College (University).

== Studies ==
Harrison graduated from Knox College with a major in Mathematics and Greek. He then enrolled for a spiritual course at the Andover Newton Theological School, Newton where he earned a Bachelor of Sacred Theology degree. He later studied at the Harvard Graduate School of Education and the Harvard Divinity School. His dissertation was later published with the title, Hindu Monism and Pluralism as Found in the Upanishads and in the Philosophies Dependent Upon Them.

== Principalship ==
In 1937, Harrison was appointed as the Principal of the Seminary and served until 1954 when J. R. Chandran took over.

K. M. Hiwale, a past Registrar of the college records that Harrison taught at the college during two periods, 1931-1958 and again from 1963 to 1965.

== Writings ==
- 1932, Hindu Monism and Pluralism as Found in the Upanishads and in the Philosophies Dependent Upon Them
- 1956, The place of Old Testament studies in Indian theological education
- 1957, After Ten Years.

Academic offices
Preceded by W. H. Thorp, WMMS	Principal; United Theological College, Bengaluru; 1937–1954	Succeeded by J. R. Chandran, CSI
Educational offices
Preceded by Position created	Teacher – in – Old Testament; United Theological College, Bengaluru; 1931–1958/1963–1965	Succeeded by E. C. John, CSI
