= Kallepalli E. Swamidass =

Indian bishop

Bishop Kallepalli E. Swamidass CSI
- Bishop – in – Karimnagar (1987-1992)
- Church: Christian
- Diocese: Karimnagar
- See: Church of South India
- In office: 1987-1992
- Predecessor: G. B. Devasahayam
- Successor: S. John Theodore
- Previous posts: Pastor, Diocese of Karimnagar, Church of South India (1956-1987)

Orders
- Consecration: 1987, CSI-Wesley Cathedral, Karimnagar by The Most Reverend I. Jesudasan, Moderator, The Right Reverend Victor Premasagar, Deputy Moderator

Bishop Kallepalli E. Swamidass was the third Bishop of the Karimnagar Diocese of the Church of South India.

== Studies ==
The United Theological College, Bangalore affiliated to India's first University, the Senate of Serampore College (University) {a University under Section 2 (f) of the University Grants Commission Act, 1956} was the spiritual formation ground for Swamidass with degree-granting authority validated by a Danish Charter and ratified by the Government of West Bengal where he studied the graduate degree of Bachelor of Divinity from 1952-1956.

During the period of his collegiate studies, Swamidass was active in the literary circles at the United Theological College, Bangalore and used to contribute to the college magazine. During 1953-1954 Swamidass was Assistant Editor for the UTC Magazine. In 1955, his article, The Cantonment Station. was published in the College Magazine of 1954.

In addition to his graduate degree in divinity, K. M. Hiwale, then Registrar of the United Theological College, Bangalore notes that Swamidass has a postgraduate degree Master of Sacred Theology which he pursued at an overseas Seminary.

== Bishopric ==
In 1987, Bishop G. B. Devasahayam resigned from the Bishopric citing health reasons which resulted in sede vacante, a situation akin to the present days when the papacy led by Pope Benedict XVI ended in 2013 on account of health reasons. The sudden turn of developments led the Church of South India Synod to huddle and announce the appointment of K. E. Swamidass as the Bishop-in-Karimnagar. I. Jesudasan then Moderator of the Church of South India Synod principally consecrated Swamidass as Bishop - in - Karimnagar in the presence of Victor Premasagar, the Deputy Moderator. Incidentally, Swamidass and his predecessor G. B. Devasahayam were companions at the Seminary in Bangalore during their study days from 1952-1956.

During Swamidass's bishopric from 1987-1992, he attended the twelfth Lambeth Conference presided by Robert Runcie then Archbishop of Canterbury. After serving for nearly six years in the Diocese, Swamidass vacated the Bishopric in 1992 on attaining superannuation resulting in sede vacante. The Church of South India Synod led by Bird Ryder Devapriyam announced the appointment of the Old Testament Scholar Sanki John Theodore to succeed Swamidass.

Religious titles
| Preceded by G. B. Devasahayam; 1982-1987 | Bishop - in - Karimnagar; Church of South India; 1987-1992 | Succeeded by S. John Theodore; 1992-2007 |
Other offices
| Preceded by G. B. Devasahayam; 1982-1987 | Member, Board of Governors; Andhra Christian Theological College, Hyderabad; 1987-1992 | Succeeded by S. John Theodore; 1992-2007 |
