= Luther Abraham =

Indian Protestant bishop

Bishop H. D. L. Abraham, CSI Assistant Bishop - in - Mysore (1966-1968) Bishop - in - Medak (1969-1975)
- The Right Reverend
- Church: Church of South India (A Uniting church comprising Wesleyan Methodist, Congregational, Presbyterian and Anglican missionary societies – ABCFM, SPG, WMMS, LMS, Basel Mission, CMS, and the Church of England)
- Diocese: Mysore (present day Karnataka Northern, Karnataka Southern and Karnataka Central); Medak
- In office: 1969–1975
- Predecessor: Position created (in Mysore); Eber Priestley, CSI (in Medak)
- Successor: Position discontinued (in Mysore); B. G. Prasada Rao, CSI (in Medak)
- Previous posts: Parish Priest - in - Hatcholli (1937-1945), Adoni (1945-1948), Bellary (1948-1966); Spiritual Formator, Union Kanarese Seminary, Tumkur (1956-1962); Assistant Bishop - in - Mysore (1966-1968)

Orders
- Ordination: 1940, Adoni by C. B. Firth of the London Missionary Society
- Consecration: 17 November 1966 by Norman C. Sargant, CSI
- Rank: Bishop

Personal details
- Born: Henry Divakara Luther Abraham; 8 February 1908 Vikarabad, Hyderabad state
- Died: 1 January 1987 (aged 78) Bellary, Karnataka
- Denomination: Christianity
- Education: Wardlaw High School, Bellary, Ceded Districts College, Anantapur, United Theological College, Bangalore

Henry Diwakar Luther Abraham (8 February 1908 – 1 January 1987) (H. D. L. Abraham; known as Luther) was the second successor of Frank Whittaker as Bishop in Medak and an able administrator.

== Writings ==
- Church and Evangelism
- The Teaching Ministry in My Diocese – Efforts and Deficiencies

== Appraisal by Scholars ==
K. M. George who authored Church of South India: Life in Union, 1947–1997:

.....An able administrator, courageous and bold like Martin Luther and Abraham.

N. Sabhapathy, a former Presbyter in Bellary who wrote about the life of Abraham:

.....He seemed to have a good influence among Village Elders and Christians in many villages. A person of great talent blessed with good health and having a zeal for evangelism. He initiated jathara in accordance with the Indian culture in the Indian situation.

== History and studies ==
Abraham was born on 8 February 1908 in Vikarabad, Telangana to Evangelist J. Y. Abraham and Smt. Paranjyothamma and studied at Wardlaw High School in Bellary from where he went to Anantapur and studied for a degree in Arts (BA) at the Ceded Districts (C.D.) College in Anantapur. He went to the United Theological College, Bengaluru between 1934 and 1937.

== Ecclesiastical ministry ==
=== Pastor ===
In 1937, he was posted to Hacholli as Assistant Pastor and in 1940, he was ordained by C. B. Firth in Adoni. Abraham also established new congregations in Challakudlur, Ravihal, Lingaladinne and Chickbellary. He seemed to have a good influence among Village Elders and Christians in many villages. E. Herbert Lewis, then Missionary supervised Abraham in his work. In 1945, Abraham was transferred from Hacholli to Adoni to a Kannada-speaking congregation.

Two years later, the Church of South India was formed on 27 September 1947. After serving three years in Adoni, Abraham was transferred to Bellary where he served till 1962. In 1953, he proposed to start a Jathara at Chickbellary during holy Easter week for three days under the mangroves of the River Tungabhadra. It was in April 1954 that the Jathara was held.

In 1956, Abraham was sent to the Selly Oak Colleges, Birmingham to lecture on Pastoria and Church Ethics for overseas missionaries. He was then assigned a teaching and administrative roles at the Union Kanarese Seminary in Tumkur before being transferred back to Bellary.

In 1962, Abraham was transferred to Cowlbazar, Bellary where he began serving until 1966.

=== Bishopric ===
Abraham was consecrated as Assistant Bishop - in - Mysore on 17 November 1966 at the St. Mark's Cathedral, Bengaluru by Norman C. Sargant, Bishop - in - Mysore.

After more than two years' of shepherding in Karnataka, Abraham was transferred and installed as Bishop - in - Medak on 3.2.1969 to set right some long-pending problems and to provide stable leadership. Abraham retired in 1975 on reaching superannuation and settled down in Bellary.

== Ex officio endeavours ==
Abraham also became the President of the College Council of Karnataka Theological College, Mangalore.

The Synod of the Church of South India again sought Abraham to set right disturbances at the Diocese of Krishna-Godavari as N. D. Ananda Rao Samuel, Bishop – in – Krishna Godavari had left the diocese in 1978 and sought refuge in Chennai, the Synodical Headquarters of the Church of South India. Abraham was again brought to Diocese of Northern Karnataka to act as Moderator's Commissary until the consecration of V. P. Dandin in 1981.

Religious titles
| Preceded by Eber Priestley | Bishop - in - Medak, Medak; 1969–1975 | Succeeded by B. G. Prasada Rao |
| Preceded by Position created | Assistant Bishop - in - Mysore, Bangalore; 1966–1968 | Succeeded by Position discontinued |
Honorary titles
| Preceded by Eber Priestley | Member, Board of Governors, Andhra Christian Theological College, Rajahmundry/Secunderabad; 1969-1975 | Succeeded by B. G. Prasada Rao |
Academic offices
| Preceded by | Seminary Teacher; Union Kanarese Seminary, Tumkur; 1956-1962 | Succeeded by |
