= Victor Premasagar =

Indian churchman and Old Testament scholar

Bishop P. Victor Premasagar, CSI B. D. (Serampore), M. A. (Cambridge), Ph. D. (St. Andrews)
- The Right Reverend
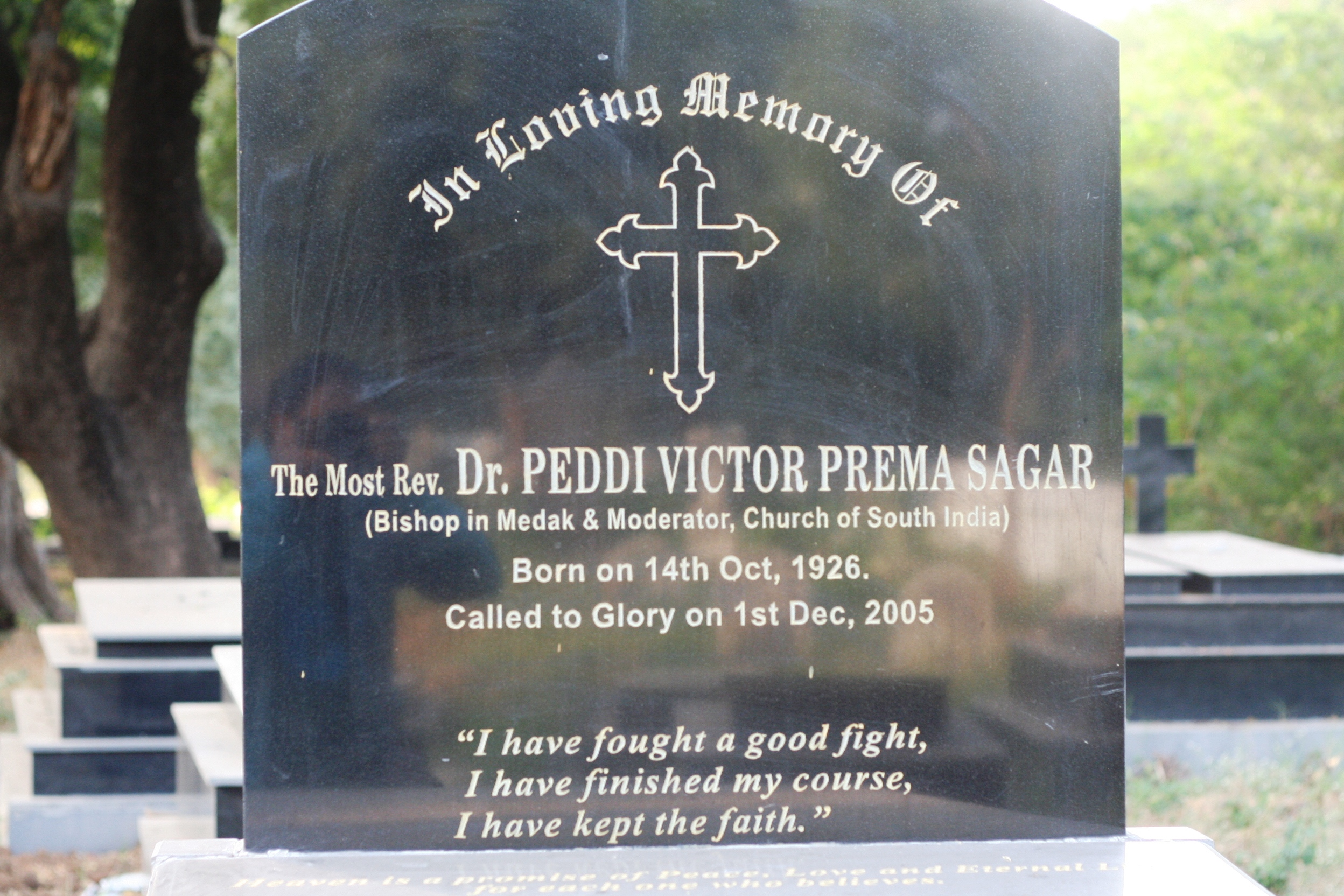
- Church: Church of South India
- Diocese: Medak
- Elected: 1983
- In office: 1983–1992
- Predecessor: B. G. Prasada Rao
- Successor: B. P. Sugandhar
- Previous posts: General secretary, Church of South India Synod, Chennai, (1980–1983), principal, Andhra Christian Theological College, Secunderabad (1973–1980), professor of Old Testament, Andhra Christian Theological College, Secunderabad (1966–1980)

Orders
- Ordination: by Frank Whittaker
- Consecration: 1983 by I. Jesudason
- Rank: Bishop

Personal details
- Born: Peddi Victor Premasagar; 14 October 1927 Dudgaon, Telangana
- Died: 1 December 2005 (aged 78) St. Joseph's General Hospital, Guntur, Andhra Pradesh
- Buried: Secunderabad Cantonment
- Denomination: Christianity
- Occupation: Priesthood
- Education: B. D., M. A., Ph. D.
- Alma mater: Andhra Christian College, Guntur (Andhra Pradesh), United Theological College, Bangalore (Karnataka), Westminster College, Cambridge (England), St Mary's College, Fife (Scotland)

Victor Premasagar (1927–2005) was the fourth successor of Frank Whittaker as Bishop in Medak. He was an Indian churchman and Old Testament scholar who made major contributions to research on the Old Testament and to the field of theology. Premasagar's articles appeared in the Expository Times (1966), the Vetus Testamentum (1966), the International Review of Mission (1972), and the Indian Journal of Theology (1974) and cited in major works relating to the theme of Promise in the Bible and critical works on Psalms LXXX and the Hebrew word HOQ in the Tanakh.

Premasagar was a pastor hailing from the Church of South India who tended rural congregations in the Diocese of Medak in north Telangana until 1961 when he became a seminary teacher at Dornakal and then moving out to Rajahmundry and later Secunderabad in 1972 and taught Old Testament. In 1980, the Church of South India recalled Premasagar to take up ministerial responsibilities and made him general secretary of the Church of South India Synod at its XVIIth session of the held at Tambaram. In 1983, Premasagar became a bishop and subsequently a moderator of the Church of South India Synod for two consecutive bienniums: 1988–1990 and 1990–1992.

== Early years ==
Premasagar was born in Medak and was raised a Christian in what is now the Church of South India. In addition to the ancient Indian epics, his boyhood was filled with stories from the Bible. In the foreword to Promise in the Ancestral Narratives, his doctoral dissertation, Premasagar made mention of the Biblical stories that his mother told during his childhood and the promise they held. He completed his schooling from Wesley School in Secunderabad. It was around this time that he to study divinity.

He completed his college studies from the century-old Andhra-Christian College (under Andhra University), Guntur. His contemporaries there included N.T. Rama Rao (a film actor and later Chief Minister of Andhra Pradesh). Premasagar was involved in athletics. Football and tennis were his favourite sports.

== Spiritual studies ==
=== Graduate: Karnataka ===
Victor went to the United Theological College in Bangalore and studied spirituality during 1950–1954 and took his Bachelor of Divinity in 1955 in the ensuing convocation of the Senate of Serampore College (University) during the Registrarship of The Rev. William Stewart. Others studying during that period at UTC Bangalore included G. Solomon, V. C. Samuel, E. C. John, Samuel Amirtham, N. D. Anandarao Samuel, C. D. Jathanna, K. E. Swamidass, G. B. Devasahayam.

=== Postgraduate: England ===
Premasagar was sent to Cambridge University where he specialized in the study of the Old Testament studying from 1964 to 1966 at Westminster College, Cambridge (affiliated to the University of Cambridge) and was awarded the Cambridge Tripos.

=== Doctoral: Scotland ===
In 1969, the Board of Governors of ACTC accorded Premasagar study leave, which he used to go to St. Andrews University, Scotland for further studies in the Old Testament. He studied in St Mary's College between 1969 and 1972 and was guided by William McKane and J. D. Martin. He was awarded a Ph.D. by St. Andrews University based on his dissertation entitled The Theme of Promise in the Patriarchal Narratives.

== Ecclesiastical ministry ==
=== Pastor ===
After Premasagar's ordination as presbyter, he began pastoring parishes in Siddipet, Mancherial, Soan, and Shankarampet.

=== Teacher ===
Premasagar first taught at the Andhra Union Theological College (AUTC), Dornakal, between 1961 and 1964, and his other colleagues included Eric J. Lott and later he left for specialized studies to England. By this time, the AUTC together with the Lutheran Theological College, Rajahmundry and the Baptist Theological Seminary, Kakinada formed the Andhra Christian Theological College in 1964. By the time Premasagar returned from his studies in 1966, he was reassigned to teach at the new entity in the river town of Rajahmundry.

Again between 1969 and 1972 after a period of study leave, he returned to ACTC to continue his teaching and became its second principal in 1973 succeeding W. D. Coleman. On invitation from Wartburg Theological Seminary, Dubuque, Iowa, in the United States, he took sabbatical from ACTC to teach there for a year. On his return, the board of governors extended the term of principalship by two more terms, 1973–1976 and 1977–1980. David, a New Testament scholar, succeeded Premasagar as principal at ACTC.

Premasagar used to teach Old Testament and Hebrew language at the Andhra Christian Theological College, first at Rajahmundry and then at Secunderabad and co-faculty included W. D. Coleman and M. Vidyanandam. By 1973, Premasagar's collegemate G. Solomon, a teacher in Old Testament at the Ramayapatnam Baptist Theological College joined the faculty, also teaching Old Testament. By 1977, G. Babu Rao, a teacher in Old Testament at Serampore College, Serampore moved to the college.

=== Synod and bishopric ===
==== Synod ====
- General Secretary

While continuing to serve at ACTC, he was elected in-absentia as General secretary of the Church of South India Synod at its XVIIth session held at Tambaram in 1980.

- Deputy Moderator

During the XXth session of the Church of South India Synod held at Trivandrum in 1986, Premasagar was elected as the deputy moderator.

- Moderator

During the XIst session of the Church of South India Synod held during 13–18 January 1988 in Madurai, he was elected as the moderator of the Church of South India.

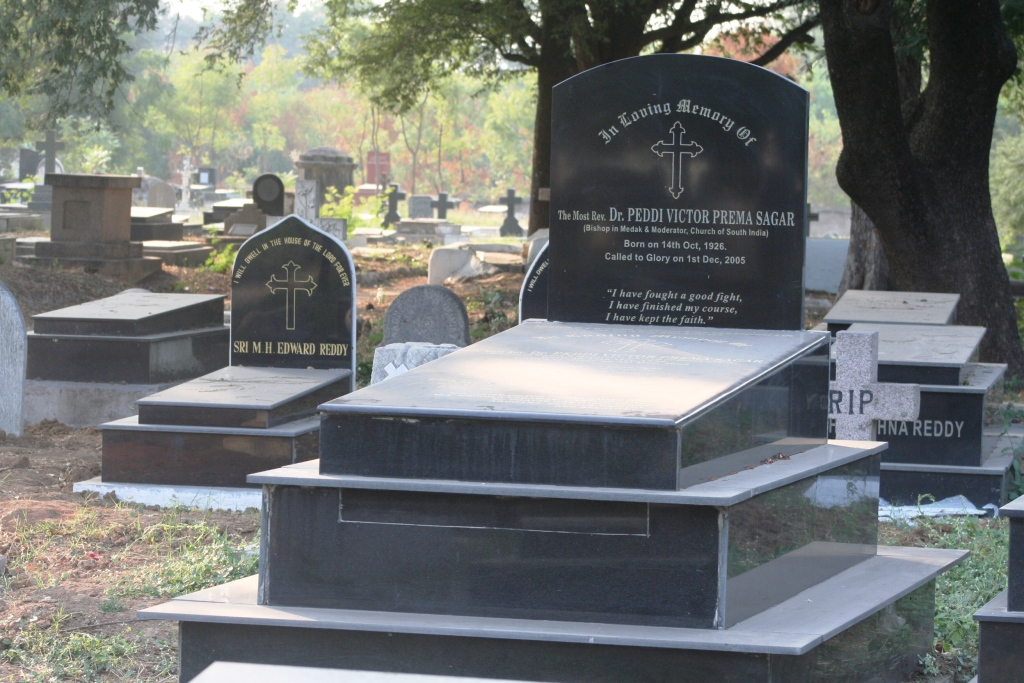
Tomb of Victor Premasagar at the Cemetery of CSI-Church of St. John the Baptist, Parade Grounds, Secunderabad Cantonment.

==== Bishopric ====
Later, in 1983 he was elected as the bishop-in-Medak, Asia's largest Anglican bishopric. It was at this time that indigenous methods were devised and put into practice for raising funds from the local congregations for supporting church programmes which was met with widespread success. He was instrumental in bringing rapid development of the church – congregation-wise as well as in its social action.

As for the educational institutions in the Diocese of Medak, schools were made to adapt to modern trends to face the changing pattern. St. George's Grammar School, Wesley College and other educational institutions were modernised during Premasagar's tenure.

In 1983, Elizabeth II of the United Kingdom came to Hyderabad. On 20 November 1983, the Queen celebrated her 36th wedding anniversary in the Holy Trinity Church in Bolarum, Secunderabad. The church service was officiated by Bishop Premasagar and his ministerial colleagues Rev. B. Prabhakar Rao and Rev. B. P. Sugandhar, the present bishop-in-Medak and the moderator of the CSI.

==== Lambeth Conference ====
The bishops of the Church of South India are invited to the decennial Lambeth Conference held at the Lambeth Palace, the seat of the archbishop of Canterbury in London. Rev. Premasagar attended the eleventh and twelfth conferences in 1978 and 1988 respectively.

== Other endeavours ==
=== Bible Society of India ===
Premasagar was a translator for the Bible Society of India (BSI) in its Telugu Bible Common Language Translation Programme since the 1970s. He headed the Translations Committee of the Bible Society of India Andhra Pradesh Auxiliary until the 1990s and then was followed by Rev. G. Babu Rao, his colleague while at ACTC. Premasagar was also the president of the Bible Society of India headquartered in Bangalore from 1988 to 1994 and continued to be a member of the India Bible Society Trust Association for a long period.

== Retirement ==
After retirement from the bishopric, Rev. Ryder Devapriyam, Bishop in Nandyal and a former colleague of Rev. Premasagar while at ACTC, succeeded him as the moderator while Rev. B. P. Sugandhar, presbyter-in-charge of Church of St John the Baptist, Secunderabad became the bishop-in-Medak.

Post-retirement, Premasagar spent about a year at the Presbyterian Church of Wales as an invitee. On his return to India, Premasagar taught part-time at ACTC. He was later invited by Dr. K. Rajaratnam, director of Gurukul Lutheran Theological College, Chennai to teach and guide doctoral students and was Professor Emeritus of Old Testament.

In 2000, Premasagar accepted an invitation to become principal of Bethel Bible College, Guntur, where he taught until his death at St. Joseph's Hospital, Guntur, on 1 December 2005.

== Works and legacy ==
Premasagar's research works have appeared in scholarly journals including the Vetus Testamentum and the Indian Journal of Theology. Some essays were written in his honour (festschrift) commemorating his shastipoorthi (completion of sixty years) and brought into a book edited by H. S. Wilson entitled The Church on the Move: Essays in honour of Victor Premasagar which was reviewed in 1990 by George Peck in the International Review of Mission Research. and a majority of his writings until that point of time compiled by his colleague, The Rev. G. Babu Rao, CBCNC, appeared in the appendix to the festschrift.

- 1966, Note on Psalm lxxx,
- 1966, A Note on HOQ in the Old Testament,
- 1972, Crisis for Salvation Theology!,
- 1974, Theology of Promise in the Patriarchal Narratives,
- 1976, A Review of the Literature on Pastoral Ministry published in India during the last Twenty-Five Years
- 1976, He emptied Himself – Bible Studies on Jesus Christ Frees and Unites,
- 1977, Biblical concept of righteousness and the Indian context,
- 1986, God's words to our Fathers: Towards an inclusive missiology in International Review of Mission, July 1986, pp.279-284.
- 1992, The Gods of our Fathers – Towards a Theology of Indian Religious and Cultural Heritage
- 1994, Vanaprasthasrama Dharma: A Programme of Renewal and Religion,
- 2000, Promise in the Ancestral Narratives: A theme of the early Hebrew traditions,
- 2000, Evangelium Dei: Mission Paradigm for a New Global Vision,
- 2002, Interpretive Diary of a Bishop – Indian Experience in Translation and Interpretation of some Biblical passages,
- 2004, Theology of a Convert: A Contribution to Indian Christian Theology from the Cultural and Religious Heritage of India,
- 2005, Jacob at the Jabbok: A struggle resulting in Transforming Experience,

Professional and academic associations
Preceded by Joseph Pathrapankal, CMI; 1972–1973	President, Society for Biblical Studies in India; 1974–1975	Succeeded by Matthew Vellanickal, Syro-Malabar; 1976–1977
Educational offices
Preceded by Saral K. Chatterjee^{Laity} 1975–1977	President, Senate of Serampore College (University), Serampore; 1977–1983	Succeeded by C. D. Jathanna, CSI; 1984–1986
Honorary titles
Preceded by R. S. Bhandare, CNI; 1982–1988	President, Bible Society of India, Bangalore; 1988–1994	Succeeded by Robert R. Cunville, TBCU; 1994–2000
Academic offices
Preceded by W. D. Coleman, AELC, 1964–1973	Principal, Andhra Christian Theological College, Secunderabad; 1973–1980	Succeeded by K. David, CBCNC; 1980–1986
Preceded by W. D. Coleman, AELC; 1964–1981; M. Vidyanandam, CSI; 1964–1972	Teacher – in – Old Testament, Andhra Christian Theological College, Secunderabad; 1966–1980	Succeeded by G. Solomon, STBC; 1973–1977; G. Babu Rao, CBCNC; 1977–1998
Other offices
Preceded by D. L. Gopalaratnam^{Laity} 1978–1980	General Secretary, Church of South India Synod, Chennai; 1980–1983	Succeeded by M. Azaraiah, CSI; 1983–1988
Religious titles
Preceded by B. G. Prasada Rao, CSI; 1976–1981	Bishop in Medak, Medak; 1983–1992	Succeeded by B. P. Sugandhar, CSI; 1993–2009
Preceded by Sundar Clarke, CSI; 1982–1986	Deputy Moderator. Church of South India Synod, Chennai; 1986–1988	Succeeded by D. Pothirajulu, CSI; 1988–1990
Preceded by I. Jesudason, CSI; 1982–1988	Moderator; Church of South India Synod, Chennai; 1988–1992	Succeeded by Ryder Devapriam, CSI; 1992

== See also ==
- Telugu Christian
- Biblia Hebraica Stuttgartensia, Latin Vulgate
- Biblical Criticism, Form Criticism
- Rev. Dr. Gerhard von Rad, Rev. Dr. Claus Westermann, Dr. Klaus Koch
- St. George's Grammar School (Hyderabad)
