= B. G. Prasada Rao =

Indian church leader (1916–1998)

Bishop B. G. Prasada Rao, CSI Bishop - in - Medak (1976-1981)
- The Right Reverend
- Church: Church of South India (A Uniting church comprising Wesleyan Methodist, Congregational, Calvinist, Presbyterian and Anglican missionary societies – ABCFM, Dutch Reformed Church, SPG, WMMS, LMS, Basel Mission, CMS, and the Church of England)
- Diocese: Medak
- In office: 1976–1981
- Predecessor: H. D. L. Abraham, CSI
- Successor: P. Victor Premasagar, CSI
- Previous posts: Auxiliary Secretary, Bible Society of India Andhra Pradesh Auxiliary, Secunderabad

Orders
- Ordination: 1948 by Frank Whittaker, CSI
- Consecration: 1976 by Ananda Rao Samuel, CSI
- Rank: Bishop

Personal details
- Born: 29 December 1916 Karimnagar, Hyderabad state
- Died: 24 June 1998 (aged 81) Hyderabad, Andhra Pradesh (1956-2014)
- Denomination: Christianity
- Occupation: Priest
- Education: B.D. (Serampore); M.Th. (Serampore)
- Alma mater: United Theological College, Bangalore (Karnataka)

B. G. Prasada Rao (Bollam Gnana Prasada Rao; 1916–1998) was the third successor of Frank Whittaker as Bishop in Medak.

== Studies ==
Prasada Rao studied theology at the United Theological College, Bengaluru between 1941 and 1945 along with Joshua Russell Chandran and Stanley Jedidiah Samartha, and again between 1953 and 1956 when he undertook an M.Th.

== Leadership ==
When the Evangelist A. B. Masilamani retired as the Auxiliary Secretary of the Bible Society of India Andhra Pradesh Auxiliary, Prasada Rao was appointed in 1969 by rural Pastor, A. E. Inbanathan, the then General Secretary of the Bible Society of India. Then Bishop - in - Medak, H. D. L. Abraham loaned the services of Prasada Rao to the Bible Society of India. It was during Prasada Rao's tenure at the Bible Society of India that Common Language Translation of the Telugu Bible (Old Testament) was undertaken by Suppogu Israel and G. Babu Rao. Incidentally, G. Babu Rao later became the Auxiliary Secretary between 1998 and 2001. In 1975, H. D. L. Abraham retired from the Bishopric of Medak on reaching superannuation. B. G. Prasada Rao also contested the vacant Bishopric and was declared elected by the then Moderator of the Synod of the Church of South India, N. D. Ananda Rao Samuel.

Prasada Rao was principally consecrated in 1976 by N. D. Ananda Rao Samuel, then Moderator.

In 1981, Prasada Rao retired from the Bishopric on reaching superannuation and became Coordinator and Director for the Haggai Institute of World Evangelism.

Other offices
Preceded by A. B. Masilamani, CBCNC; 1963–1969	Auxiliary Secretary; Bible Society of India Andhra Pradesh Auxiliary; 1969–1976	Succeeded by T. B. D. Prakasa Rao, CSI; 1976–1981
Religious titles
Preceded by H. D. L. Abraham, CSI; 1969–1975	Diocese of Medak of the Church of South India; Bishop - in - Medak; 1976–1981	Succeeded by Victor Premasagar, CSI; 1983–1992
