= Timotheas Hembrom =

- Born: 31 July 1939; Kolkata, India
- Died: 18 August 2020 (aged 81)
- Education: L.Th./Santal Theological College, Benagaria, B. D./United Theological College, Bangalore, M. Th./United Theological College, Bangalore, D.Th./South Asia Theological Research Institute, Bangalore
- Church: Northern Evangelical Lutheran Church/Church of North India
- Ordained: 1985 by D. C. Gorai, Bishop - in - Kolkata, Church of North India
- Writings: See section
- Congregations served: Osmond Memorial Church, Kolkata
- Offices held: Professor, Santal Theological College, Benagaria 1970-1971, Chera Theological College, Cherrapunji, 1973-1977, Bishop’s College, Calcutta 1977-, Gossner Theological College, Ranchi
- Title: The Reverend Doctor

Timotheas Hembrom (31 July 1939 – 18 August 2020) was an ordained Minister of the Church of North India and an Old Testament Scholar who taught at the Bishop's College, Kolkata, affiliated to the nation's first University, the Senate of Serampore College (University). As a Biblical scholar, Hembrom was a member of the scholarly Society for Biblical Studies in India, with members from the Protestant, Orthodox, Catholic and Charismatic Church societies. He researched on Santali creation traditions and his work was first published in 1996 (reprinted in 2013) was simultaneously reviewed in the Indian Journal of Theology and the Journal of Hindu-Christian Studies.

Hembrom had been the editor of the Santali magazine, Jug-Sirijol published by the Santali Cultural and Literary Society, Kolkata in Roman script.

== Contributions ==
=== Comparative studies between creation stories ===
Hembrom's research and exegetical work on the Santhals highlights the hitherto unknown facts about their creation traditions which seem identical to the Biblical creation traditions. K. P. Aleaz writes that Hembrom worked on finding out parallels between the Biblical creation stories and the Santal creation stories, which seemed identical with those in the Genesis creation stories. In this context of similarity, K. P. Aleaz in A Tribal Theology from a Tribal World - View considers Renthy Keitzer, Nirmal Minz and Hembrom as the Theologians with focus on Tribal cultures and ideologies.

In a recent work by the Scholar Ivy Imogene Hansdak of the Jamia Millia Islamia on Santal creation stories the research of Hembrom was highlighted

The Santal theologian and writer, Dr. Timotheas Hembrom, has made a study of the Santal creation myth in his work, The Santals: Anthropological-Theological Reflections on Santali and Biblical Creation Traditions (1996). Here he begins by comparing Skrefsrud‘s version with Campbell‘s version, and then concludes by validating the latter. This version is then compared with the Biblical creation narrative. Two other writers, Marine Carrin and Harald Tambs-Lyche, have also commented on Skrefsrud‘s version of the Santal creation myth in their work, An Encounter of Peripheries: Santals, Missionaries, and their Changing Worlds, 1867-1900 (2008). According to them, Skrefsrud presented this myth as a parallel to Genesis, a tendency still found among Christian Santals.

As a comparative religion scholar who drew parallels between the Genesis creation story and the Santal creation traditions, Hembram attributes the lead given by Old Testament's leading Scholar, Claus Westermann, "Our very extensive knowledge of literature about creation and primeval time does not allow us to draw a sharp line of distinction between the high cultures and the primitive cultures and then to exclude the latter from the pre-history of the biblical story of primeval events."

=== Santali Linguistics ===
The Jug-Sirijol which advances Santali language and literature focusing on the tribal identities continues to be published in Roman script which has been in use since the pre-colonial times. Hembrom had been editor of Jug-Sirijol for a number of years'. Although a new script, Ol Chiki alphabet was propagated in 1979, it had met dissent with the Santhal people who voiced their concerns to the scholarly fora including the University of California, Berkeley and had also referred to the concerns of Hembrom who wrote on the use of Ol Chiki alphabet,

(adapted)…in West Bengal the issue of Santali script was further complicated by the Government when in 1979 it recognized Ol Chiki Script for publication of Santali literature.... but the Ol Chiki script has remained as an abnormally born baby still in an incubator all through these last twenty years.

== Studies ==
=== Pre-graduate ===
After early schooling at the Kaerabani Santal High School in Kaerabani, Dumka district, Hembrom had his ministerial formation at Santal Theological College, Benagaria, which had just then received affiliation from the nation's first University, the Senate of Serampore College (University). Hembram studied at the College during the Principalship of J. T. Krogh and moved to Serampore College, Serampore in 1967 from where he obtained a Licentiate in Theology from the University under the Registrarship of C. Devasahayam.

=== Graduate ===
In order to upgrade his academics, Hembram proceeded to Bangalore where he studied from 1968 to 1970 at the United Theological College, Bangalore, affiliated to the nation's first University, the Senate of Serampore College (University), under the Principalship of Joshua Russell Chandran where he upgraded to Bachelor of Divinity. Hembram companions at the College included H. S. Wilson, P. J. Lawrence, J. W. Gladstone and others who studied at varying intervals.

=== Postgraduate ===
In his second stint at the College in Bangalore between 1971-1973, Hembrom enrolled for postgraduate studies, Master of Theology, specialising in Old Testament under his Teachers, E. C. John, G. M. Butterworth and Gerhard Wehmeier working out a dissertation entitled Man and his destiny in the priestly sections of the Pentateuch. Hembrom was part of the pioneer group of postgraduate students who specialised in Old Testament comprising A. P. Chacko, Basil Rebera, G. Babu Rao, Nitoy Achümi, and S. J. Theodore. However, Hembrom was awarded a degree only in 1975 in the ensuing convocation of the Senate of Serampore College (University) held on 1 February 1975 at the Serampore College, Serampore under the Registrarship of C. Devasahayam, Hembrom was awarded a Master of Theology degree where the Convocation Commemoration Mass in Serampore was conducted by his seminary companion, G. Babu Rao who had already become an Old Testament Teacher at Serampore College. at the CNI-St. Olave's Church, Serampore.

=== Doctoral ===
While teaching at the Bishop's College, Kolkata, Hembrom availed study leave and pursued research studies with the South Asia Theological Research Institute, Bangalore, a doctoral-level institute under the Senate of Serampore College (University) researching on the Santals with special reference to their creation stories and was supervised by Renthy Keitzar and Nirmal Minz who enabled him to work on his thesis after which Hembrom was able to submit his doctoral dissertation in 1991 which was originally entitled The Creation narrative of the Santals and the Genesis Creation narrative: A probing into their theological motifs after which the Senate of Serampore College (University) awarded him a doctoral degree during the registrarship of D. S. Satyaranjan.

== Inculturation and the practicalities ==
Hembrom belonged to the Lutheran Danish Santal Mission (Northern Evangelical Lutheran Church). In the 1960s, an unexpected turn of events took place relating to the issue of inculturation. Although Hembram had his schooling at the Mission schools established by the Danish Santal Mission which was founded in 1867, where he grew on strong Christian ethics and enrolled for theological studies at the Santal Theological College, Dumka district and later at the Protestant Regional Seminary in Bangalore where he completed graduate studies in theology (Bachelor of Divinity), returning to his alma mater in 1970 to resume teaching when J. T. Krogh still happened to be the Principal. This was the 1960s when the Second Vatican Council had concluded and Papal encyclicals were issued concerning the local cultures and their adaptation in the Christian liturgy. Rev. Fr. D. S. Amalorpavadass who pitched for inculturation at the Second Vatican Council found that his appeals had been met. However, back at the Santal Theological College, the Lutherans were yet to adapt the local traditions into the Christian liturgy. During that period, Hembrom took a couple of his students to a Santali wedding where they happened to participate in music and dance which involved the playing of Santal music using the Tamak' and Tumdak'. The Danish Santali Mission (Northern Evangelical Lutheran Church) took a rigid stance debarring not only Hembrom but even those students who accompanied him. In the ensuing student unfriendly environment, the Principal, J. T. Krogh voiced his apprehension at the decision of the Council of the Northern Evangelical Lutheran Church and left the College taking along with him the five debarred students as well as his debarred colleague Hembram and joined en masse in the Church of North India-led Bishop’s College, Calcutta. The students continued their studies at the Bishop’s College, Calcutta, Hembrom was sent by the College for postgraduate studies to Bangalore while J. T. Krogh was accommodated into the Faculty at the Bishop’s College, Calcutta.

Hembrams continued to be grateful to the Lutheran Danish Santal Mission (Northern Evangelical Lutheran Church) and rather attributed the circumstances to lack of understanding at that point of time. The issue of inculturation, also referred to as indigenization took a dominant role in the scholarly meetings of the Society for Biblical Studies in India in which Hembrams also happens to be a member. Successive biennial conclaves of the Old Testament and New Testament scholars of the Protestant, Orthodox, Catholic and Charismatic traditions discussed whether it is possible to interpret the Bible in an Indian way. Rev. Fr. Joseph Pathrapankal, Rev. Dr. E. C. John, Rev. Fr. Matthew Vellanickal and other members of the scholarly society contributed immensely to the Indian interpretation and adopting of traditional forms in worship. Year's later, Biblical scholars also published Indian Interpretation of the Bible in 2000 honouring Rev. Fr. Joseph Pathrapankal. Similarly, Comparative religion scholars of the Indian seminaries began to adopt the native traditions and particularly the Indian ethos in Christian liturgy.

== Ecclesiastical ministry ==
=== Benagaria ===
Hembrams was a Teacher at his alma mater, the Santal Theological College, Benagaria and started his ecclesiastical teaching ministry. After a two-year break during 1968-1970 to upgrade his academics at Bangalore, he returned to the Benagaria and taught again during 1970-1971.

=== Cherrapunji ===
After Hembrams specialised in Old Testament, he proceeded to the Chera Theological College, Cherrapunji where he taught from 1973-1977.

=== Kolkata ===
After a stint of four years at Cherrapunji, Hembram moved to the Bishop’s College, Kolkata and was Professor of Old Testament from 1977. His other colleagues at the Seminary included the renowned Religions Scholar, Yisu Das Tiwari. During the latter half of the 1980s, G. D. V. Prasad who specialized in Old Testament joined the College as a Teacher and became a colleague of him .

He also acted as Research Guide and was Registrar at the North India Institute of Post Graduate Theological Studies, a joint initiative of Serampore College and the Bishop’s College, Kolkata. As a member of the Church History Association of India, Hembrom was also elected as the Treasurer of the Eastern India Branch of the Society in 2006.

=== Ranchi ===
He is also taught at the Gossner Theological College, Ranchi, an institution known for the Theologian Nirmal Minz who happened to be one of his doctoral supervisors.

== Death ==
Hembrom died on the 18th of August, 2020.

== Writings ==
No date, Doing Theology with the people of primal religion in India: Absence of Hymns and Praises to God has a theological reason in the ancestral religion of the Santals
1996, Maran Buru Bonga - Satan Equation a Theological Crime,
1996/2013, The Santals: Anthropological-Theological reflections on Santali and Biblical Creation Traditions,
2007, The significance of water in the Old Testament,
2012 (in Santali), Santal, Sirjon binti ar bhed-bhangao

== Honours ==
In 2014, the Diocese of Durgapur of the Church of North India awarded the annual Paul Olaf Bodding memorial award to Timotheas Hembrom for his writings highlighting the Tribal ethos of India.

Professional and academic associations
Preceded by D. K. Sahu	Registrar, North India Institute of Post Graduate Theological Studies; Kolkata/Serampore	Succeeded by Siga Arles
