= Gossner =

Gossner may refer to:

== People ==
- Ernst Gossner (born 1967), Austrian film director, screenwriter and producer
- Hans-Jürgen Goßner (born 1990), German politician
- Johannes Gossner (1773–1858), German clergyman and philanthropist
- Miriam Gössner (born 1990), German biathlete and cross-country skier
- Simone Daro Gossner (1920–2002), Belgian-American astronomer

== Education ==
- Gossner Theological College, a Christian Theological Seminary in Jharkhand, India
- Gossner College, a Christian college in Assam, India

== Other ==
- Gossner Foods, one of the largest cheese manufacturers in the United States, based in Logan, Utah
