= D. S. Satyaranjan =

Indian theologian (1939–2022)

The Reverend D. S. Satyaranjan, IPC D.D. Honoris causa (Serampore) (2016)
- Born: Dondapati Samuel Satyaranjan; 19 January 1939; Eluru, West Godavari District, Madras Presidency
- Died: June 13, 2022 (aged 83); Secunderabad, Hyderabad district, Telangana
- Other name: Satyaranjan Ayyagaru
- Education: B.A. (Andhra); B. D. (Serampore); M. Th. (Serampore); D.Min. (SFTS)
- Alma mater: Sir C. R. Reddy College, Eluru (Andhra Pradesh); Serampore College, Serampore (West Bengal); United Theological College, Bangalore (Karnataka); San Francisco Theological Seminary, San Francisco (California)
- Years active: 1965-2022 (57 years)
- Known for: Administration of India's first modern University
- Religion: Christianity
- Church: Indian Pentecostal Church of God
- Ordained: by N. D. Ananda Rao Samuel, Bishop - in - Diocese of Krishna-Godavari and Moderator of the Church of South India
- Writings: Satyaranjan, D. S. (1973). Gifts of the Spirit" - A study of Divine Charismata in the New Testament with special reference to I Corinthians 12-14 (MTh). Serampore.; Satyaranjan, D. S. (2009). The Preaching of Daniel Thambirajah (D.T.) Niles: Homiletical Criticism. New Delhi: ISPCK. ISBN 978-81-8458-092-1.
- Congregations served: St. Olave's Church, Serampore (West Bengal); CSI-St. Peter's Church, Bangalore (Karnataka); CSI-Church of St. John the Baptist, Secunderabad (Telangana)
- Offices held: Administrative Officer, Senate of Serampore College (University), Serampore (1965–1971); Lecturer - in - New Testament and Registrar, United Theological College, Bengaluru (1973–1978); Registrar, Senate of Serampore College (University), Serampore (1978–2004)
- Title: The Reverend Doctor

D. S. Satyaranjan (19 January 1939 – 13 June 2022) was a Silver Jubilee Pastor, a New Testament Scholar, and an Administrator who served as the Registrar of the Senate of Serampore College (University), the nation's first University {a University under Section 2 (f) of the University Grants Commission Act, 1956} with degree-granting authority validated by a Danish Charter and ratified by the Government of West Bengal.

Satyaranjan was Registrar of the University from 1978 through 2004 serving more than 26 years in the University traversing the Indian subcontinent as the University had affiliated institutions not only in India but also in Bangla Desh, and Sri Lanka. Recognising the services of Satyaranjan to the University and the theological domain, the Council of the Senate of Serampore College (University) conferred the degree of Doctor of Divinity by Honoris Causa in 2016 at its annual convocation in one of its affiliated colleges, the Andhra Christian Theological College, Hyderabad in Telangana.

== Studies ==
=== Graduate ===
After graduate studies leading to B.A. degree through the Andhra University in 1959, Satyaranjan went for ministerial formation to the Serampore College, West Bengal where he studied from 1961-1964 during the Principalship of William Stewart. Satyaranjan's teachers included Yisu Das Tiwari who taught Sanskrit and Religions. Suppogu Joseph also partly studied in Serampore during 1964 coinciding with the final year of Satyaranjan's studies at the College. The University awarded a B.D. degree in the ensuing convocation in 1965 during the Registrarship of C. Devasahayam.

=== Postgraduate ===
In the year 1971 Satyaranjan sought study leave and proceeded to the United Theological College, Bangalore under the principalship of J. R. Chandran. Satyaranjan's postgraduate companions included Arthur Jayakumar, Basil Rebera, C. P. Athyal, Dhyanchand Carr, G. Babu Rao, Godwin Shiri, Kishore Kosala, M. Kipgen, P. B. Santram, S. D. L. Alagodi, T. Joy, Timotheas Hembrom and V. E. Varghese. After a two-year study period, Satyaranjan obtained a M.Th. degree in New Testament where he also worked out a dissertation entitled "Gifts of the Spirit" - A study of Divine Charismata in the New Testament with special reference to I Corinthians 12-14. The University awarded a postgraduate degree during the Registrarship of C. Devasahayam in the ensuing convocation that took place in Serampore College, Serampore in 1974.

=== Research studies ===
In 1986, Satyaranjan was admitted to the San Francisco Theological Seminary for a D.Min. programme under the supervision of Charles L. Bartow where he researched on the theme, The Implementation of Criteria for Homiletical Criticism educed from D. T. Niles' Theory and Practice of Preaching in an Evaluation of selected Indian Sermons. The Senate granted sabbatical to Rev. Satyaranjan who then proceeded to the United States of America and spent time at the San Francisco Theological Seminary (SFTS).

After nearly twenty five years, Satyaranjan's doctoral work was published in 2009 with the title The Preaching of Daniel Thambirajah (D.T.) Niles: Homiletical Criticism.

== Ecclesiastical ministry ==
=== Serampore ===
==== Administrative Officer ====
After completing studies in Serampore College, Satyaranjan was invited to serve as an Administrative Officer at the Senate of Serampore College (University). Accepting the responsibility entrusted to him, he served in that capacity from 1965 through 1971 under the then Registrar, Rev. Chetti Devasahayam. This period partly coincided with the graduate studies (1964-1967) of G. Babu Rao, James Massey, S. Jeyapaul David and others as well as that of Suppogu Joseph who was pursuing postgraduate studies (1966-1968).

==== Registrar ====
By 1978, the Senate of Serampore College (University) in which Rev. Satyaranjan earlier served as Administrative Officer invited him again, this time to serve as its Registrar. By this time, Satyaranjan's postgraduate companion, G. Babu Rao, an Old Testament Teacher during 1974-1977 at Serampore College had moved to Secunderabad to begin teaching at the Protestant Regional Theologiate and the following year in February 1979, the annual convocation of the University, with Satyaranjan as Registrar, was held at the Andhra Christian Theological College, Secunderabad where the Commemoration Mass was led by G. Babu Rao at the St. Gregorious Malankara Orthodox Syrian Cathedral in the neighbourhood. For nearly 26 years Satyaranjan was involved in the University administration and finally retired on attaining superannuation as Registrar of the University in 2004 following which the Council of the University appointed Y. Ravi Tiwari to succeed him.

=== Bangalore ===
During 1973-1978, Satyaranjan was Lecturer of New Testament at the United Theological College, Bangalore, also serving as Registrar of the College during the Principalship of J. R. Chandran.

== Honours ==
In 2004, the Board of Theological Education of the Senate of Serampore College and the South Asia Theological Research Institute brought out a fetschrift in honour of Satyaranjan entitled, Together with People: Essays in honour of Rev. D. S. Satyaranjan edited by Samson Prabhakar and has essays by his companions J. W. Gladstone, H. S. Wilson, Roger Gaikwad, Gabriele Dietrich and others.

In 2016, the Senate of Serampore College (University) conferred a Doctor of Divinity degree by honoris causa upon Satyaranjan at its annual convocation held at the Andhra Christian Theological College, Hyderabad in Telangana by the Master of the University, John Sadananda.

Academic offices
Preceded by J. T. Krogh, NELC	Registrar; Senate of Serampore College (University); 1978–2004	Succeeded by Y. Ravi Tiwari, MCI
