= P. G. George =

Indian Old Testament Scholar (born 1952)

The Reverend Doctor P. G. George MMTSC
- Born: Paduthottu G. George 8 October 1952; Travancore Cochin, India
- Other name: George Achen
- Citizenship: Indian
- Education: Government Science College, Rewa; Awadhesh Pratap Singh University, Rewa (B.Sc.), M.Sc.); Wycliffe College, Toronto (M.Div., Th.M., Th.D.)
- Occupation: Theologian
- Parent: P. V. George

Ecclesiastical career
- Religion: Christianity
- Church: Malankara Mar Thoma Syrian Church
- Ordained: 23 April 1991
- Congregations: St. John's Mar Thoma Church, Queens, New York City (1992-1994), Long Island Mar Thoma Church, Merrick, New York, (1992-1994), Mar Thoma Church, Kolkata, (2002)
- Offices held: Professor, Mar Thoma Theological Seminary, Kottayam (2004); Principal, Dharma Jyoti Vidyapeeth, Faridabad (-2014); Dean of Research, South Asia Theological Research Institute, Serampore (2014-)
- Title: Rev. Dr.

P. G. George (born 8 October 1952) is an Indian Old Testament scholar who was dean of studies at the South Asia Theological Research Institute, Serampore, West Bengal.

== Life ==
George's research works have been reviewed in the Toronto Journal of Theology and the Elenchus of Biblica. George researched on the Hebrew Bible using the methodology of Semantics which puts him among the Translation scholars in the line of Basil Rebera.

George is a member of the Society for Biblical Studies, India which has been a scholarly fellowship for Biblical scholars of the Protestant, Orthodox, Catholic, and Charismatic Churches since the past fifty years and has attended the biennial conclave of the Society for Biblical Studies, India in 2014 held at Bangalore which elected P. Joseph Titus as its president for the biennium 2014–2016. George's teacher, Anthony Raymond Ceresko, OSFS was also a member of the Society for Biblical Studies, India.

Concerning the scholarship of George, the Old Testament Guru, Fr. Anthony Raymond Ceresko, OSFS wrote,

George's thorough analysis of the terms for "Rod" has brought to light important nuances of meaning in the Hebrew vocabulary, especially with regard to the principal words, מַטֶּה matteh and sḗbeṭ. The insights uncovered by Dr. George's work offer valuable information for scholars involved in Bible translation, Hebrew lexicography, and the study of the societal patterns in ancient Israel

== Writings ==
=== Articles ===
- 1983, Saint Thomas Christians: Whence and Whither,
- 2002, Towards An Immigrant Theology,
- 2002, Plight of Urban Youth: A Practical Interpretation of 2 Kings 2, 23-25,
- 2005, Immigrant Abraham’ on the Move: Towards an Immigrant Theology.
- 2010, Re-defining the Mission: Proverbs as an 'Immigrant Theologian' and a Pastor,
- 2012, An Immigrant Community at the Crossroads,
- no date (Edited), Towards the First Holy Communion Day: An outline of the Mar Thoma Catechism,

=== Books ===
==== Authored ====
- in Malayalam

- 2002, Snehatinte Neerchalukal,
- 2006, Suvarna Mozhikal,
- 2007, Krush: Kashtappedunna Manushante Prathyasha,

- in English

- 2004, The Rod in the Old Testament: A Study of Vocabulary and Function
- 2006, Cross: Hope of Suffering Humanity,
- 2009, Towards the First Communion Day,

==== Edited ====
- in Malayalam

- 2007 (co-edited with E. J. George Achen), Suvisheshathinte Kavalbhadan
- 2007, Narachathala Sobayulla Kiridam,
- 2010 (co-edited with Philipose Mar Chrysostom) Pradidina Chindakal,

- in English

- 2015 (Edited), Theological Research in the Global South: Prospects and Challenges,
- 2015 (Edited), Reclaiming manyness : re-reading M. M. Thomas in the light of Indian Christian theologies,

==== Translated ====
- 2004, (Translated from Malayalam original), The Lord’s Prayers: A Devotional Study by Juhanon Mar Thoma,

=== Commentaries ===
- 2015 (with Paul Swarup, CNI), Commentary on Exodus in South Asia Bible Commentary: A One-Volume Commentary on the Whole Bible,

== Devotional audio ==
In 1999, George provided the lyrics for the Malayalam devotional audio Yesuve Ninakkai with music composed by Senu Thomas and sung by Vijay Yesudas and K J Yesudas.

== Education ==
=== India ===
George pursued graduate and postgraduate courses in Sciences at the Government Science College, Rewa in Madhya Pradesh and has both a B.Sc. and an M.Sc. degree from the Awadhesh Pratap Singh University, Rewa.

=== Canada ===
George first enrolled at the Wycliffe College, Toronto for an M.Div. programme and continued his studies leading to postgraduation studies at Wycliffe College, Toronto during 1983 where he specialized in Old Testament supervised by Stanley Walters.

He then enrolled for a doctoral programme his studies at Wycliffe College, where he was once again supervised by Stanley Walters. George's doctoral thesis was entitled The Rod in the Old Testament: A Study of Vocabulary and Function. He received the Th.D degree in 1988.

== Ecclesiastical ministry ==
From 1992 to 1994, George was a Vicar at parishes in the New York City.

After returning from New York City, George began teaching Old Testament at the Mar Thoma Theological Seminary, Kottayam along with Geevarghese Mathew, then Professor of Old Testament.

The Dharma Jyoti Vidyapeeth, Faridabad is an institution of the Mar Thoma Church affiliated to the Senate of Serampore College (University) whose first principal was the legendary Old Testament Scholar, K. V. Mathew who served from 2000 to 2002 followed by V. S. Varghese. During the later years, George moved from Kottayam to Faridabad, where he became principal of the college and served in that capacity till 2014.

In 2014, George moved to Serampore where he was appointed Dean of Research at the South Asia Theological Research Institute where he used to guide doctoral-level researchers.

Academic offices
Preceded by Geevarughese Mathew	Professor of Old Testament, Mar Thoma Theological Seminary, Kottayam, Kerala; 1988-1992/2003-2007	Succeeded by
Preceded by	Principal, Dharma Jyoti Vidyapeeth, Faridabad, Haryana -2014	Succeeded by Koshy P. Varghese
Preceded by H. Vanlalauva	Dean of Research, South Asia Theological Research Institute, Serampore, West Bengal; 2014-2018	Succeeded by Limatula Longkumer
