= Gossner Evangelical Lutheran Church in Chotanagpur and Assam =

Lutheran Church in India

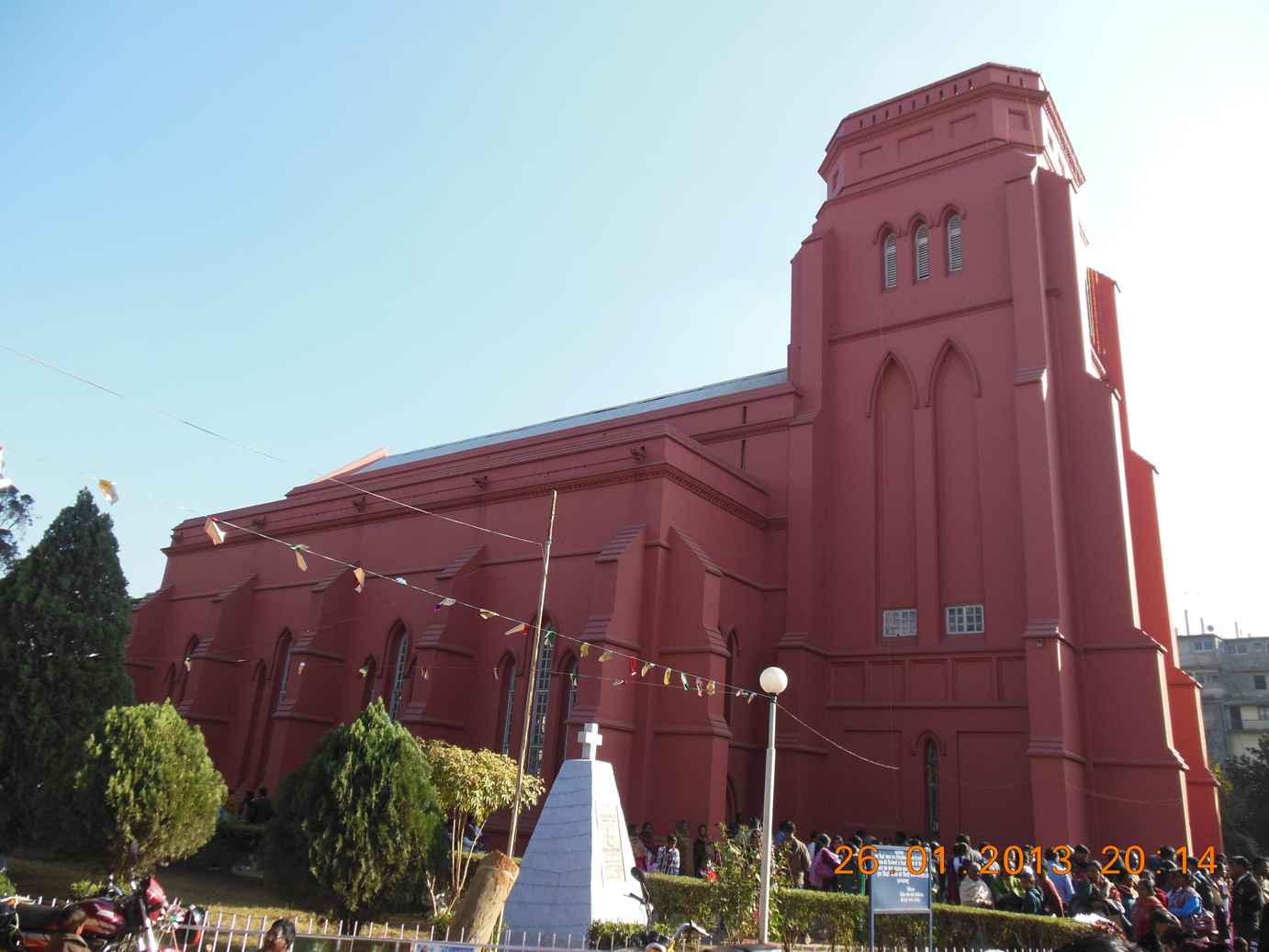
- Gossner Evangelical Lutheran Church in Chotanagpur and Assam.
- Classification: Protestant
- Orientation: Lutheran
- Theology: Lutheran
- Leader: Moderator The Most Rt. Rev. Marshall Kerketta
- Region: India
- Headquarters: Main Road Ranchi Jharkhand, India 834001
- Congregations: 1,895
- Members: 583,960+ (2013)

The Gossner Evangelical Lutheran Church in Chotanagpur and Assam (GELC) is a major Christian Protestant denomination in India, with hundreds of thousands of members. It was established on 2 November 1845. The church is affiliated with the National Council of Churches in India, the United Evangelical Lutheran Church in India, the Lutheran World Federation, and the World Council of Churches. It is currently led by Moderator Bishop Marshall Kerketta. GELC is one of the three Lutheran denominations in northeast India, alongside the Bodo Evangelical Lutheran Church and the Northern Evangelical Lutheran Church.

== History ==
The Gossner Evangelical Lutheran Church, headquartered in Ranchi, Jharkhand (formerly Bihar), is one of the largest and most widespread Lutheran churches in India. Its origins date back to 1845 when Johannes Evangelista Gossner from Germany sent four missionaries to launch the Lutheran mission in India. These missionaries were:

- Rev. Emil Schatz
- Rev. August Brandt
- Rev. Fredrick Basch
- Rev. Theodore Yankey

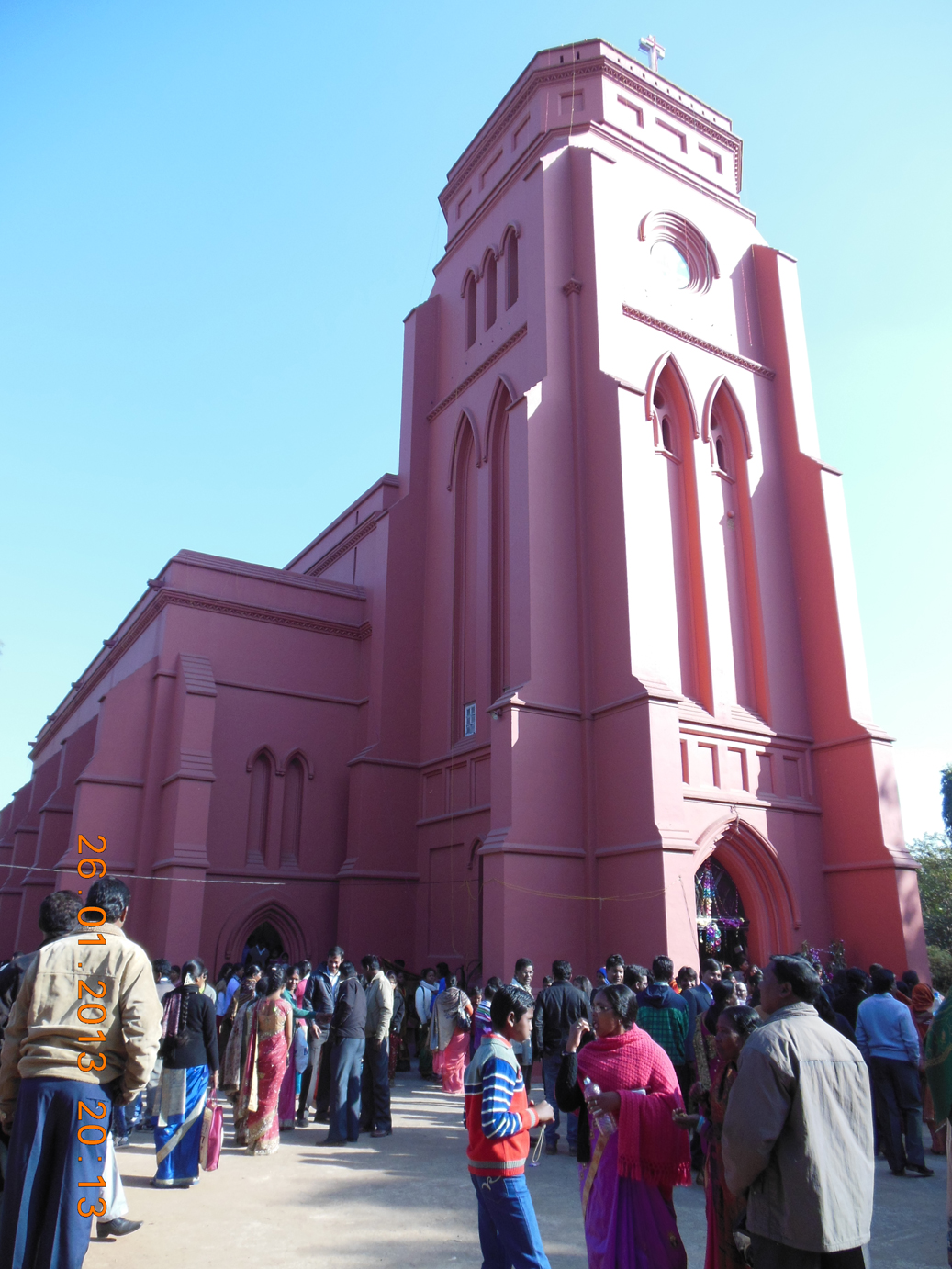
Main Building, G.E.L.Church, Ranchi

The missionaries departed from Germany in 1844 and arrived in Kolkata (formerly Calcutta) in 1845. Their initial destination was Mergui in Myanmar (formerly Burma), where they planned to preach the Christian faith among the Karen people or in areas near the foothills of the Himalayas. However, after meeting some people from Ranchi, they decided to change their plans and focus on Chotanagpur and its main town, Ranchi. They arrived in Ranchi on 2 November 1845 and set up camp on what is now known as the 'Bethesda Ground' in Ranchi.

== First Baptisms ==
The first baptism was conducted on 25 June 1846, when a girl named Martha received the sacrament. Additional children were baptized on 26 June 1846.

Adult Conversions:

- Four Oraon individuals were baptized on 9 June 1850.
- One Munda individual was baptized on 26 October 1851.
- Nine Bengali individuals were baptized on 1 October 1855.
- Two Kharia individuals were baptized on 8 June 1866.
- One Ho individual was baptized on 10 May 1868.

Rev. Johannes Evangelista Gossner contributed ₹13,000 from his personal funds to support the missionaries in building a church in Ranchi. The church was named Christ Church. It still stands today and is regularly used for worship.

== Protests ==
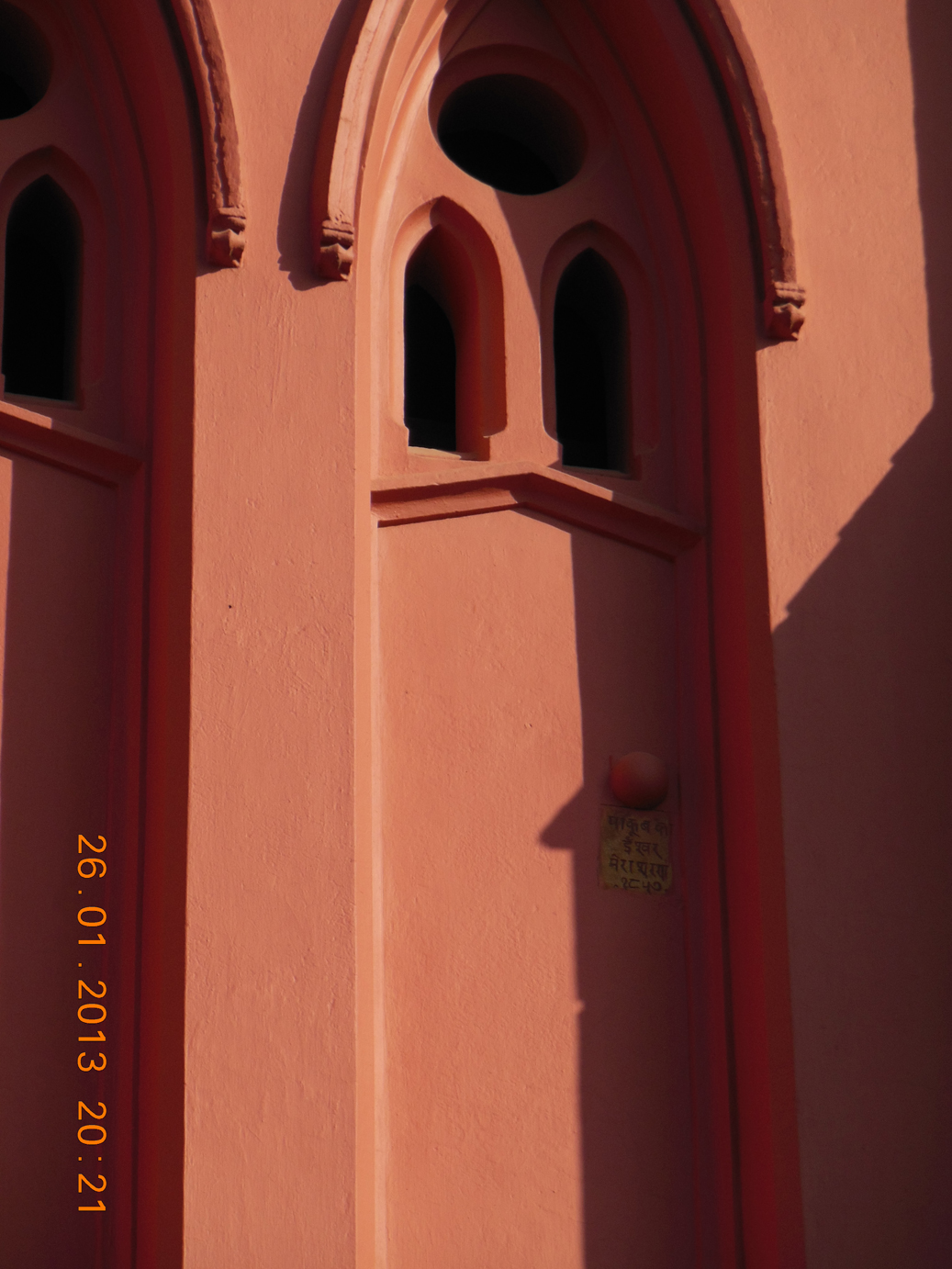
The historical cannonball, G.E.L.Church, Ranchi

During the Indian Rebellion of 1857, in July, the church faced widespread protests. The students and other Christians in the area were forced to flee and took refuge in the jungles of Dumargari, Bilsereng, located 38 km from Ranchi. To mark the place, they erected a Stone Cross, which is now known as Khristan Dera. A service is held at this site every year on 1 February.

During the rebellion, mutineers from the British Army stationed in the area fired cannonballs at the church building in Ranchi. Although the church structure suffered no significant damage, the top of the building was blown off, and one cannonball remains embedded in a wall to this day as a historical remnant.

During World War I, the missionaries were forced to return to Germany in 1915. Control of the church was subsequently handed over to Rev. Foss Westcott, the then Anglican Bishop at the time. Rev. Westcott is also known as the founder of Bishop Westcott Boys' School.

== Autonomy and Administration ==
The church declared its autonomy on 10 July 1919. A body called the 'Central Church Council' was formed to oversee the church and its sub-organizations. The government established a body called the 'Mission Trust of Northern India' to govern and manage the church's property. This trust was dissolved in 1928. The trust agreed to hand over all the church's property to be managed by the 'Board of Trustees' until 1938. On 9 May 1940, the Board transferred all the property back to the church.

The church was officially registered on 30 July 1921 in the office of the Registrar of Joint Stock Companies, Patna, under the 'Societies Registration Act 21 of 1860' (Vide No. 273J).

The church was then headed by the President of the Church. The first president was Rt. Rev. Hanukdatto Lakra, while the first secretary was Mr. Peter Hurad. The advisory board was dissolved on 10 February 1928. Many of the German missionaries returned to India in the same year and began working under the church.

They were placed under house arrest starting in 1939, when the Second World War began.

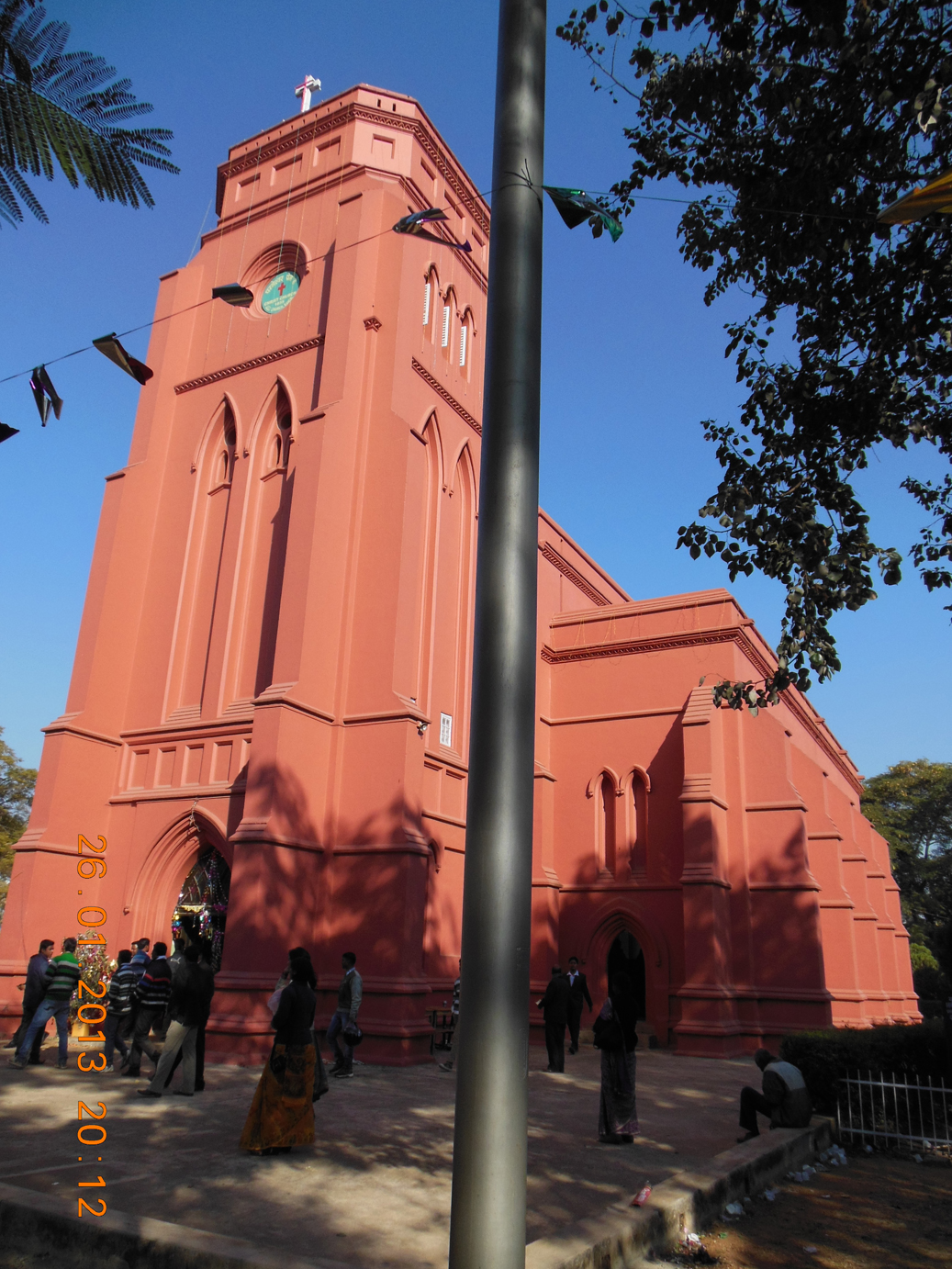
Main Building, G.E.L.Church, Ranchi

The rules were amended in 1948, and the entire area was divided into 15 Synods, with the congregation in Ranchi selected as the headquarters. The rules were amended again in 1960, and the church was reorganized into 4 Anchals (units of districts within the church), with a Synod in Khuntitoli and the Ranchi congregation serving as the headquarters. In 1970, Khuntitoli was declared the fifth diocese. A Central Advisory Board, 5 Anchals, and several other boards were also formed to assist the Central Advisory Board (K.S.S.).

The Central Advisory Board decided to amend the rules once again in 1973, with the amendments set to take effect in 1975. However, due to several reasons, the amendments were not implemented. The K.S.S. was reformed, but only by the four Anchals of the church, which was unconstitutional. As a result, the North West Anchal conducted its elections based on the 1960s constitution and formed the North Western Gossner Evangelical Lutheran Church. Later, two priests from the North Western Gossner Evangelical Lutheran Church joined the Gossner Evangelical Lutheran Church and became part of the North West Anchal. Efforts to reach a compromise were made by the United Evangelical Lutheran Church in India over many years, but all of them failed.

Another effort to amend the rules was made, but it also failed. The amendments finally came into effect on 2 November 1995. According to these amendments, the church was divided into the Ranchi Headquarters Congregation and 5 dioceses:

- North East Diocese (Assam, Tejpur)
- North West Diocese (Ranchi and northwestern areas)
- South East Diocese (southeast of Ranchi, Kadma, Khunti)
- South West Diocese (southwest of Ranchi, Odisha, Rajgangpur)
- Central Diocese (Khuntitoli, Simdega)

In a meeting held from 16–18 May 2006, the central council included Jatatoli and Kinirkela Parishes from the North West Diocese, as well as Kornjo Parish from the South East Diocese, in the Central Diocese. This was formally announced on 17 January 2007.

== Present-day operations ==
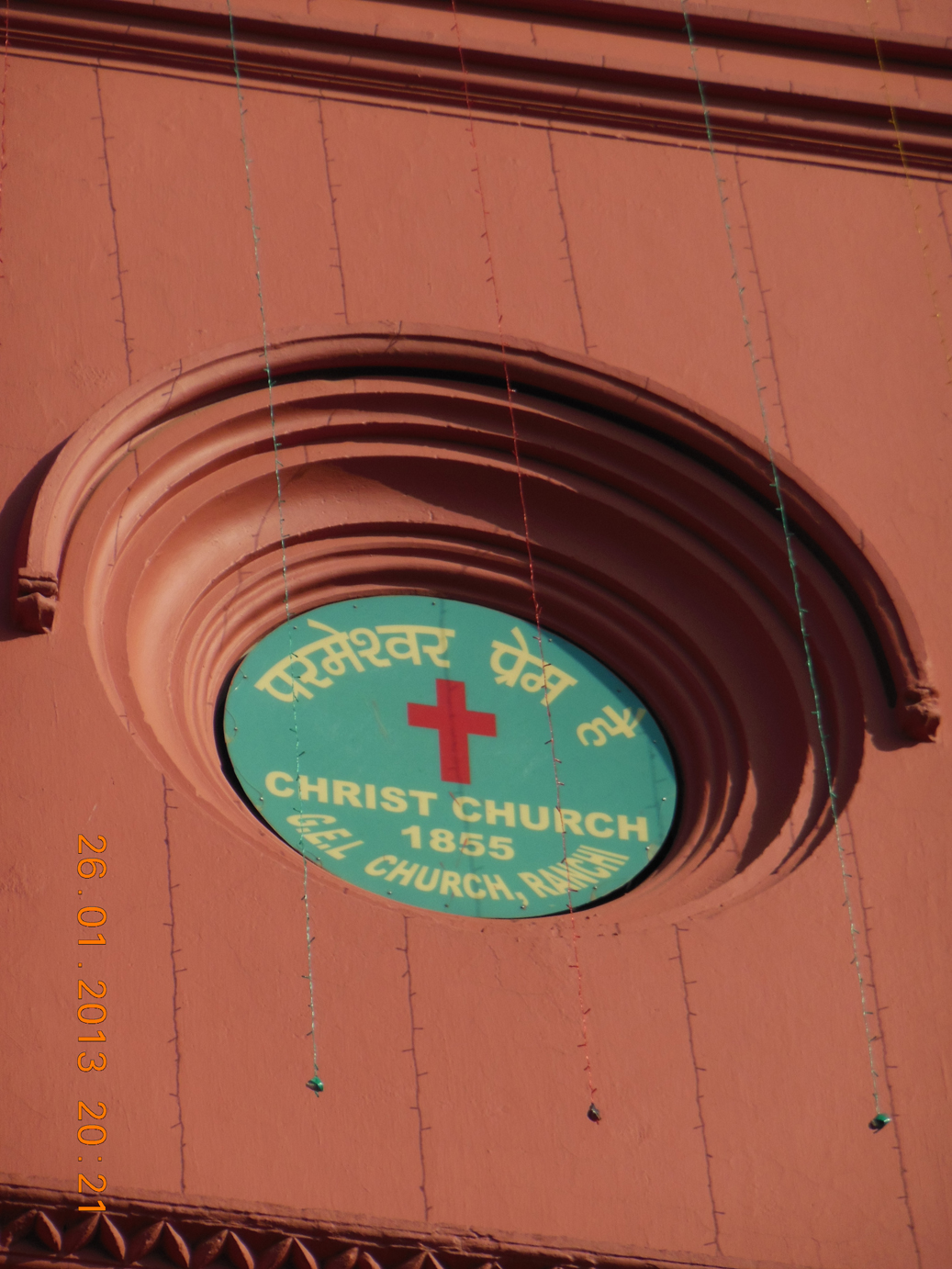
Main Building, G.E.L.Church, Ranchi

The church is divided into five dioceses, each headed by the Moderator. Ranchi serves as the headquarters, and the Dean heads its congregation. Currently, the church has around 500,000 congregational members spread across 1,687 pastorates (congregation-wise) in the states of Jharkhand, Bihar, West Bengal, Madhya Pradesh, Chhattisgarh, Orissa, Maharashtra, Arunachal Pradesh, Assam, Haryana, Andaman and Nicobar, Uttar Pradesh, as well as major cities such as Delhi, Kolkata, Chennai, and Mumbai. The church also has a presence in the northeastern states.

The church runs the following institutions:

- Gossner Theological College
- Bible School
- Four Colleges
- Two Teachers' Training Colleges
- Technical Centre
- Agricultural Training Centre
- Human Resources Development Centre
- Twenty-four secondary schools
- Printing Press-cum-Training Centre
- Hospital
- Dispensary
- Three boarding homes for the poor and needy
- Old Age Home

Its overseas mission partners are Gossner Mission (Berlin, Germany) and the Evangelical Church Berlin-Brandenburg-Schlesische Oberlausitz (Germany).

GELC is a member church of the United Evangelical Lutheran Church in India.

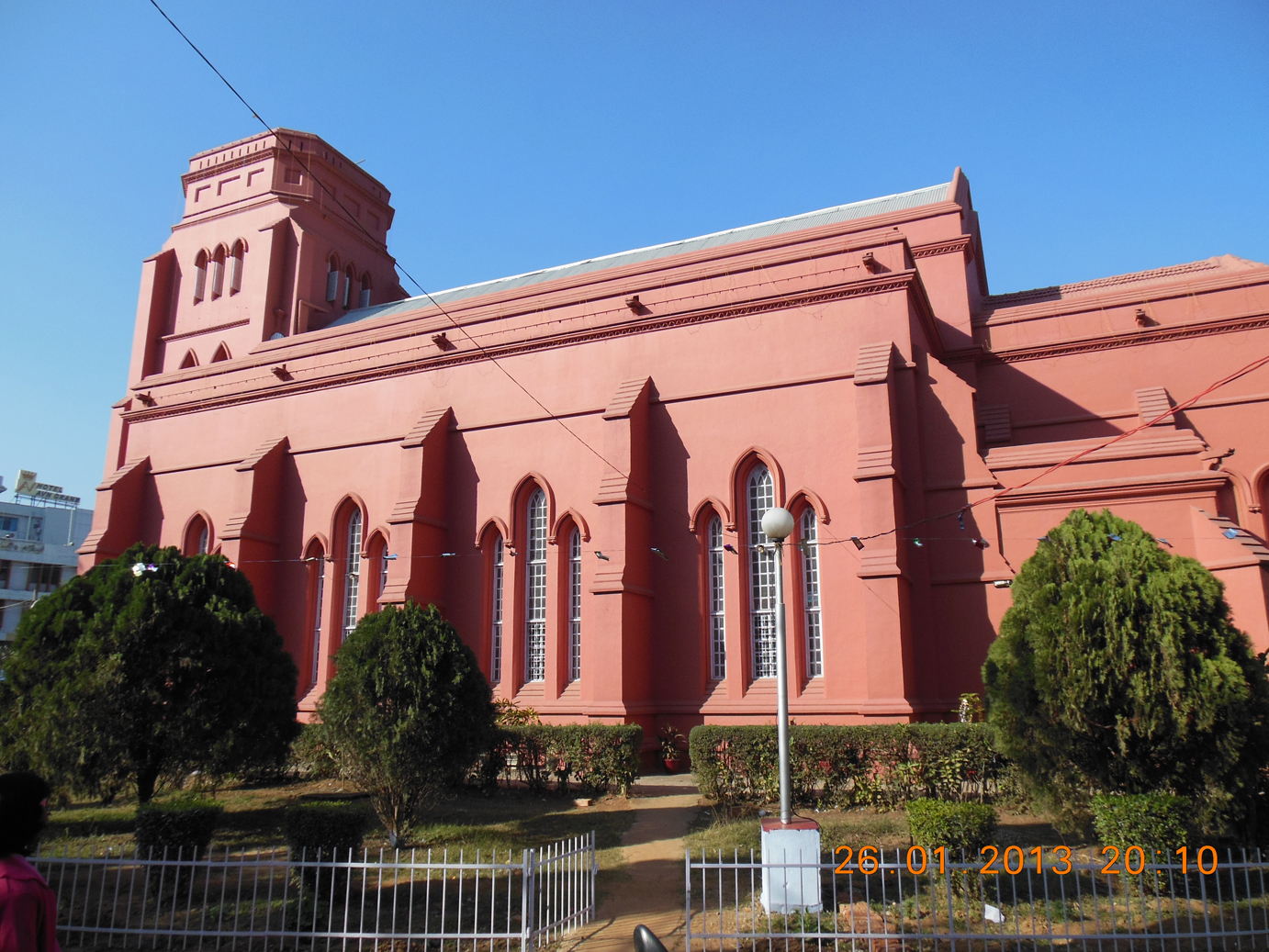
Main Building, G.E.L.Church, Ranchi

== Women and Youth involvement ==
The women and youth in the church also play a vital role in conducting relief and awareness programs. Notably, their efforts worth mentioning are during the Bhopal gas tragedy and the cyclone in Orissa.

== See also ==
- North Western Gossner Evangelical Lutheran Church
- Gossner Theological College
- Adivasi
- Christianity in India
- Christianity in Jharkhand
