= Nirmal Minz =

Indian scholar (1927–2021)

- Bishop Emeritus
- Church: Lutheran
- See: N.W.G.E.L.Church
- In office: 1980-1996
- Predecessor: Post Created
- Successor: Prabhudas Sunil Tirkey
- Previous posts: Professor, Gossner Theological College, Ranchi

Personal details
- Born: 11 February 1927 Anwratoli, Gumla District, Jharkhand
- Died: 5 May 2021 (aged 94)

Nirmal Minz (11 February 1927 – 5 May 2021) was an Indian Christian theologian. He was Bishop Emeritus of the Protestant North Western Gossner Evangelical Lutheran Church Society who served as bishop from 1980 through 1996.

As a scholar, Nirmal Minz was an authority on Tribal and indigenous people and culture. Minz viewed tribes as being the indigenous people of India and opined that moves to alienate their landholding will cause destruction to the planet Earth itself. As for the attitudes of the indigenous peoples, Minz believed that the accommodative nature, communitarian ownership of properties and decision by consensus did not find favour with the colonial British India which even continues to this day with the powers that be. Professor K. P. Aleaz in A Tribal Theology from a Tribal World - View considers Nirmal Minz along with Renthy Keitzer and Timotheas Hembrom as the Theologians with focus on Tribal cultures and ideologies.

The Gossner College, Ranchi was founded by Nirmal Minz in 1971 where stories abound about its students topping the ranks.

== Studies and academics ==
=== Graduate ===
Nirmal pursued graduate studies earning a Bachelor of Arts in 1950 at Patna University. After discerning his avocation towards priesthood, he was sent for spiritual formation to the Serampore College, a constituent College of the nation's first University, the Senate of Serampore College (University) where he studied from 1951-1953 earning the graduate degree Bachelor of Divinity. One of Nirmal's companions at the college was K. V. Mathew of the Malankara Mar Thoma Syrian Church.

=== Postgraduate ===
After availing study leave from the Church Society, Minz went to Minnesota where he pursued a dual degree programme, one in theology and the other in anthropology at the Luther Seminary and the University of Minnesota respectively earning both a Master of Theology specialising in Systematic Theology and a Master of Arts degree specialising in Anthropology. Minz's postgraduation theses were entitled The Messiah Or the Prophet in Nativistic Movements (for M. Th. degree) and the other A Christian Community in a Culture (for M. A. degree).

=== Doctoral ===
Minz availed study leave once again and pursued doctoral studies at the University of Chicago where he earned a doctorate degree in Systematic Theology in 1968 after submitting a doctoral dissertation entitled Mahatma Gandhi and Hindu-Christian Dialogue.

== Death ==
Nirmal Minz died on 5 May 2021, at the age of 94.

== Writings ==
=== Books ===
- 1957, A Christian Community in a Culture,
- 1957, The Messiah Or the Prophet in Nativistic Movements,
- 1960, The Industrial Parish,
- 1968, A Memorandum on the Adivasi Problems in Central Tribal Belt of India and Their Permanent Solutions (with Joel Lakra),
- 1970, Mahatma Gandhi and Hindu-Christian Dialogue,
- 1997, Rise Up, My People, and Claim the Promise: The Gospel Among the Tribes of India,

=== Articles ===
- 1961, Approach to Tribal Communities Today (with Dilbar Hans and B. M. Pugh),
- 1980, Transforming Effects of Christianity on the Tribals of Chotanagpur
- 1987, A Theological Interpretation of the Tribal Reality in India,
- 1994, Dalit-Tribal: A Search for a Common Ideology

== Honours ==
In 2005, the Jesuit, Anand Amaladass in Indian Christian Thinkers (Volume I) included Nirmal Minz's life story highlighting Minz's contribution.

Similarly, in 2007, the Jesuit Indian Social Institute, New Delhi published a fetschrift in honour of Nirmal Minz with articles by the legendary Old Testament Scholar K. V. Mathew, Josepha Mariyānusa Kujūra, Sonajharia Minz and others.

In 2017, he got Bhasha Samman by Sahitya Akademi for his works in Kurukh language.

Religious titles
Preceded by Post created	Bishop; North Western Gossner Evangelical Lutheran Church; 1980-1996	Succeeded by Prabhudas Sunil Tirkey; 1996-2007
