= Nistar Kujur =

Indian Bishop

Most Reverend Nistar Kujur
- Bishop of Central Diocese
- Native name: Rt. Rev. Nistar Kujur
- Church: Lutheran
- Diocese: Central Diocese
- See: N.W.G.E.L.Church
- Appointed: January 24, 2022
- In office: 2022-Present
- Predecessor: Position Established
- Successor: Incumbent

Orders
- Consecration: 24 January 2024
- Rank: Bishop

Personal details
- Born: Nistar Kujur; 1965 (age 60–61) Gumla
- Parents: Mahindar Kujur (father) Phoolkumari Kujur (mother)
- Spouse: Harshit Kujur
- Children: 2 son
- Education: Kartik Oraon College, Gumla

Rev.Nistar Kujur (born 1965) is an Indian Lutheran Bishop who serves as the first Bishop of Central Diocese of North Western Gossner Evangelical Lutheran Church from 2022.
