= Kadma =

Kadma may refer to one of a number of articles:

- Kadma (Jamshedpur), a neighbourhood in Jamshedpur, Jharkhand, India
- Kadma (trope), Torah cantillation mark
- Kadma, Khunti, a village in Jharkhand, India
- Kadma, Hazaribagh, a census town in Jharkhand, India
