= Nirdosh (disambiguation) =

Nirdosh may refer to:

- Nirdosh Lakra, Indian bishop
- Nirdosh (1941 film), a 1941 Indian film
