= Augustus Ekka =

Indian Lutheran bishop

The Most Reverend Rev. Augustus Ekka
- Bishop of Dakshini Diocese
- Church: N.W.G.E.L.Church
- Diocese: Dakshini Diocese
- Appointed: 24 January 2022
- In office: 2022–present
- Predecessor: Position Established
- Successor: Incumbent

Orders
- Ordination: 23 June 1991
- Consecration: 24 January 2024
- Rank: Bishop

Personal details
- Born: Augustus Ekka; 15 May 1962 (age 64) Galgotri, Gumla, Jharkhand
- Denomination: Lutheran
- Parents: Immanuel Ekka (father); Jasmani Ekka (mother)
- Spouse: Augastina Ekka (m. 1993)
- Children: Anugrah Ekka (son)

Rev. Augustus Ekka (born 15 May 1962) is an Indian Bishop. Ekka is born in India and Ordained to the priesthood in 1991. He serves as the first Bishop of Dakshini Diocese of North Western Gossner Evangelical Lutheran Church since 2022.

== Early life ==
Rev. Augustus Ekka was born on 15 May 1962 in the small village of Galgotri, Gumla, Jharkhand. He is the eldest son of his parents. He completed his primary education in his village and secondary education in Sursang. After completing his secondary education he completed his I.A. and B.A. in Kartik Oraon College, Gumla, in geography.

He completed his spiritual study of Bachelor of Divinity in Serampore Theological College, West Bengal. Then he completed his Diploma in E.C.M. in Mindolo Ecumenical Foundation, Kitwe, Zambia.
