= Ruby Hembrom =

Indian publisher

- Born: Kolkata, West Bengal, India
- Occupation: Publisher
- Organization: Adivaani

Ruby Hembrom is the founder and director of Adivaani, a not-for-profit publishing and archiving outfit based in Kolkata, West Bengal.

== Biography ==
Hembrom is the founder and director of Adivaani organisation. Adivaani is the "voice of Santal peoples". Hembrom was born in Kolkata to theologian Timotheas Hembrom and his wife, Elveena.
