= Dular Lakra =

Indian bishop (1959–2021)

The Most Reverend Dular Lakra
- Church: Lutheran
- See: N.W.G.E.L.Church
- Appointed: 13 January 2013
- In office: 2013-2021
- Predecessor: Rt.Rev.Nirdosh Lakra
- Successor: Rt.Rev.Rajiw Satish Toppo

Personal details
- Born: Dular Lakra; 14 July 1959 Gumla Jharkhand
- Died: 23 April 2021 (aged 61) Ranchi

Rt.Rev.Dular Lakra (14 July 1959 – 23 April 2021) was Bishop Emeritus of the Protestant North Western Gossner Evangelical Lutheran Church Society who served as the 4th bishop from 13 January 2013 to 2021.
