= Sonajharia Minz =

Indian academic and researcher (born 1962)

- Born: December 1962 (age 63); Ranchi, Jharkhand
- Occupations: Mathematician; computer scientist; researcher; activist
- Parents: Nirmal Minz (father); Paracleta Minz (mother)

Academic background
- Education: Jawaharlal Nehru University (M.Phil. & Ph.D. in Computer Science) Women's Christian College (B.Sc in Mathematics) Madras Christian College (M.Sc in Mathematics)

Sonajharia Minz (born 1962) is an Indian academic, mathematician, computer scientist, researcher and tribal rights activist. She served as the Vice-Chancellor of Sido Kanhu Murmu University from May 2020 to June 2023. She is currently a professor at the School of Computer and Systems Sciences, Jawaharlal Nehru University and serves as the UNESCO Co-Chair in Transforming Indigenous Knowledge Research Governance (IKRG) and Rematriation to advance Indigenous rights, knowledge systems, and self-determination.

== Early life ==
Born in December 1962, Sonajharia hails from Oraon tribe, and from Gumla district in Jharkhand. She is the oldest of the four daughters of Paracleta Minz and Late Dr. Nirmal Minz, a social ideologue and activist. Having been nurtured to fight the odds to prove as equal with the best and to go beyond, she completed her schooling in Ranchi. Her interest in athletics and games were founded in school which played a role in shaping her determination on the face of odds. She completed her Pre University Course (PUC) from Jyoti Nivas College, Bangalore and graduated in mathematics from Women's Christian College, Chennai. She continued to do MSc in mathematics from Madras Christian College, Chennai.

== Academic career ==
After completing M.Phil. computer science from Jawaharlal Nehru University (JNU), New Delhi, Minz worked as the assistant professor in the Department of Computer Science, Barkatullah University of Bhopal since May 1990. She joined the Department of Computer Science, Madurai Kamaraj University in March 1991. In January 1992, Minz became assistant professor in the School of Computer and Systems Sciences, Jawaharlal Nehru University. She earned her PhD in computer science from Jawaharlal Nehru University (JNU), New Delhi in 1997.

Minz was appointed in the post of associate professor in 1997 and was promoted to be professor at the School of Computer and Systems Sciences, Jawaharlal Nehru University in 2005. Her areas of research include artificial intelligence, machine learning, soft computing (rough set theory, granular computing), data mining and geospatial analytics. She has supervised several doctoral research and master's research and has published research papers in international and national journals, and has presented research papers in conferences, international and national, of high repute.

Raised with the sensitivity about the plight of the tribal communities in Central India, having faced discriminatory treatment at a very young age at school, she engaged in matters of the constitutional provisions and rights of the marginalized and underprivileged students, dalit, adivasi, people with disabilities, women and minorities, informally as well as in her formal capacity of advisor and later, chief advisor, Equal Opportunity Office (EOO), Jawaharlal Nehru University. She was a member of Gender Sensitization and Committee Against Sexual Harassment (GSCASH). Minz assumed many administrative roles in JNU such as warden, proctor, provost, member of Executive Council and Academic Council of JNU. Minz was dean of School of Computer and Systems Sciences during 2009 - 2011. In 2018, she was elected president of the Jawaharlal Nehru University Teachers' Association (JNUTA), securing 344 out of 597 votes.

On 27 May 2020, the Governor of Jharkhand, Draupadi Murmu appointed her as the vice-chancellor to the Sido Kanhu Murmu University in Dumka. With her commitment to mainstream tribal languages, art and culture, new programmes such as Santal Culture Studies, certificate courses on tribal design, art and craft were offered in Sido Kanhu Murmu University, Dumka, Jharkhand. In 2022 at the Barcelona UNESCO Higher Education Conference, she participated in a session on Role of Tribal/Indigenous Knowledge in Higher Education.

After successful completion of her term as vice chancellor, Sido Kanhu Murmu University, Dumka, Jharkhand, in June 2023, Sonajharia Minz returned to her parent institution, School of Computer and Systems Sciences, Jawaharlal Nehru University, New Delhi.

== Recognition and awards ==
In June 2025, Minz was appointed Co-Chairholder of UNESCO Chair in Transforming Indigenous Knowledge Research Governance and Rematriation for a four-year term to advance Indigenous rights, knowledge systems, and self-determination. The position is jointly held with Dr. Amy Parent from Simon Fraser University, Canada.

== Selected publications ==
- Ali Mohammed Al-Yarimi, Fuad; Minz, Sonajharia (18 December 2012). "Data Privacy in Data Engineering, the Privacy Preserving Models and Techniques in Data Mining and Data Publishing: Contemporary Affirmation of the Recent Literature". International Journal of Computer Applications. 60 (3). Foundation of Computer Science: 40–47. doi:10.5120/9676-4103. ISSN 0975-8887.
- Abughali, Ibrahim K. A.; Minz, Sonajharia (2015). "Binarizing Change for Fast Trend Similarity Based Clustering of Time Series Data". Pattern Recognition and Machine Intelligence. Vol. 9124. Cham: Springer International Publishing. doi:10.1007/978-3-319-19941-2_25. ISBN 978-3-319-19940-5.
- Kumar, Vinesh; Minz, Sonajharia (10 March 2017). "CCRA: channel criticality based resource allocation in cognitive radio networks". International Journal of Communication Systems. 30 (4). doi:10.1002/dac.3012. ISSN 1074-5351.
- Information, Communication and Computing Technology: Third International Conference, ICICCT 2018, New Delhi, India, May 12, 2018, Revised Selected Papers. Vol. 835. Singapore: Springer Singapore. 2019. doi:10.1007/978-981-13-5992-7. ISBN 978-981-13-5991-0.
- Raj, Aditya; Minz, Sonajharia; Choudhury, Tanupriya (2024). "Spatial clustering-based parametric change footprint pattern analysis in Landsat images". International Journal of Environmental Science and Technology. 21 (6): 5777–5794. doi:10.1007/s13762-023-05369-8. ISSN 1735-1472.
- Minz, Nirmal; Minz, Sonajharia (2007). Pearls of Indigenous Wisdom: Selected Essays from Lifetime Contributions by Bishop Dr. Nirmal Minz, an Adivasi Intellectual. Indian Social Institute & Christian Institute for the Study of Religion and Society, Bangalore. ISBN 978-81-89762-17-9.
