= North India Institute of Post Graduate Theological Studies =

Academic institution in Calcutta, India and Serampore, India

North India Institute of Post Graduate Theological Studies (NIIPGTS)
- Motto: to educate women and men and mould them as leaders in religious life as scholars, teachers, ministers, and other professionals for leadership and service both nationally and internationally enabling them to build a world beyond cultural and religious divide.
- Founders: Bishop’s College, Calcutta and Serampore College, Serampore
- Established: 1980
- Registrar: The Rev. K. K. Chatry, PCI, Ph.D. (Birmingham)
- Address: Bishop’s College, Calcutta, 224, A.J.C Bose Road, Kolkata 700 017, West Bengal
- Location: Kolkata and Serampore, West Bengal, India
- Website: https://niipgts.in/

North India Institute of Post Graduate Theological Studies (NIIPGTS) is an academic institution of higher learning promoted by the Bishop’s College, Calcutta and the Serampore College, Serampore comprising faculty from both the institutions affiliated to the nation's first University, the Senate of Serampore College (University).

The NIIPGTS was started in 1980 to offer postgraduate courses under the Senate of Serampore College (University) with select specialisations. In 1998, the Institute started offering specialisation in Missiology. In 1999, the NIPPGTS was recognised as an institution offering doctoral-level courses by the Senate of Serampore College (University).

== Succession of Registrars of the NIIPGTS ==
The following have been Registrars of the NIIPGTS:

- The Rev. D. V. Singh, MCI, D.Th. (Serampore),
- The Rev. S. D. L. Alagodi, CSI, M.Th. (Serampore),
- The Rev. D. A. K. Mondal, Th.D. (GTU),
- The Rev. K. David, CBCNC, Ph.D. (Edinburgh),
- The Rev. A. Behera, CBCNEI, D.Th. (Serampore),
- The Rev. D. K. Sahu, CNI, Ph.D. (Birmingham),
- The Rev. T. Hembrom, NELC, D.Th. (Serampore),
- The Rev. Siga Arles, CSI, Ph.D. (Aberdeen),
- The Rev. V. J. John, MMTSC, D.Th. (Serampore),
- The Rev. Ivy Singh, CSI, D.Th. (Serampore),
- The Rev. Samuel Longkumer, CBCNEI, D.Th. (Serampore),
- The Rev. P. C. Gine, BBU, D.Theol. (Melbourne)
- The Rev. Limatula Longkumer, CBCNEI, D.Th., (Serampore)
- The Rev. Aswathy John, MMTSC, D.Th., (Serampore)
- The Rev. T. Chuba Jamir, CBCNEI, Ph.D. (MGU),
- The Rev. K. K. Chatry, PCI, Ph.D. (Birmingham),
