= Y. D. Tiwari =

Indian theologian

- Born: 1911; Agra, Uttar Pradesh
- Died: 1997 (aged 85–86); Shillong, Meghalaya
- Parent(s): Mother: Rajkunwar; Father: Pandit Hari Govind Tiwari
- Church: Baptist
- Ordained: 1947
- Offices held: Lecturer in Sanskrit & Philosophy of Religions: North India United Theological College, Bareilly; Serampore College, Serampore; Bishop's College, Kolkata; Co-Acharya: Christ Prem Seva Ashram, Pune
- Title: Reverend

Notes
- Data as of November 2008

Yisu Das Tiwari (1911–1997) was an Indian theologian and a leading participant in Hindu-Christian dialogue.

He was a scholar in Sanskrit, Hindi and Greek. The Bible Society of India entrusted him with revision of the Hindi Bible (New Testament) into a contemporary version.

== History ==
Yisu Das Tiwari was born Badri Prasad Tiwari into a Vaishnavite family in Agra in 1911 to Smt. Rajkunwar and Pandit Hari Govind Tiwari. As a growing youth, Tiwari was influenced by Swami Dayananda Saraswati, founder of the Arya Samaj and Swami Rama Tirtha.

It was during his college days, that he came under the influence of Canon Holland, E. Stanley Jones, C. F. Andrews and others. After a reading of the Gospel according to Saint John, he took keen interest in the studies of the Bible and devotional writings of Christian mystics. However, his newfound faith did not go well with his family members who sent him for internment to a mental asylum.

Tiwari however became a Christian and chose to be baptised in January 1935 under the aegis of the Baptist Missionary Society.

He later joined Mahatma Gandhi's Ashram in Wardha and began to follow Gandhi's teachings.

Simultaneously, Tiwari began growing in his new-found faith in Jesus Christ and chose to become a priest. He was ordained by the Baptist Missionary Society.

== Contribution ==
=== Translation of Scriptures ===
It was William Carey who first brought out the Hindi Bible

In the latter half of the twentieth century, the Bible Society of India took upon the task of translating the existing versions of the Bible into contemporary versions. As early as 1956, the Hindi Common Language Translation Panel headed by Y. D. Tiwari came out with the Gospel according to Mark. In due course of time, the other books of the New Testament were also translated from the original Greek into Hindi.

Translations (year-wise)

- 1956, Gospel according to Mark in Hindi.
- 1958, Epistle to the Philippians in Hindi.
- 1959, Gospel according to John in Hindi.
- 1961, Gospel according to St John in Hindi.
- 1962, Four Gospels and the Acts of the Apostles in Hindi.
- 1967, New Testament in Hindi.

=== Teaching ===
Tiwari began his career as a teacher in schools - Mission School, Kotgarh, Shimla, and Baptist Mission School, Agra, where he was the Head Master, before finally stepping onto the portals of seminaries. He first taught at the North India United Theological College in Bareilly, Uttar Pradesh before he moved to Serampore College, Serampore, West Bengal. He was lecturer in Sanskrit and Philosophy of Religions at the Serampore College from 1963 to 1972. Notable among his students were D. S. Satyaranjan, Paulose Mar Paulose, G. Babu Rao and others.

Rev. Tiwari later taught at the Bishop's College, Kolkata from the academic year 1972-1973 onwards.

== Appraisal ==
- K. V. Mathew, (Edinburgh), Professor of Old Testament, Mar Thoma Theological Seminary, Kottayam:

... Tiwari shunned violence. He was a 'sadhu' indeed. This doesn't mean that Yesudas was a coward or one who could not endure pain and suffering. He would endure anything in his body and mind and never cause pain to others. Being a bystander or witness to violence like a sadist, was not part of his nature. Being a 'sadhu', he was full of love and compassion. It was difficult for anyone to pick a fight with Tiwari. He was willing to lend a helping hand to others at all times.

- K. P. Aleaz, D. Th. (South Asia Theological Research Institute), Professor of Religions, Bishop's College, Kolkata:

... He inculcated in students a respect for other religious experiences. Through his life, he taught that we can be disciples of Jesus without discarding any of our ancestral cultural traits. He was a typical Indian Christian, whose life proclaimed that Christianity is not a foreign religion. He was a person who kept constant contact with the people of other religious faiths; a person who was all for dialogue in practice. He had deep knowledge in Hindu Sanskrit religious texts, but would impart that knowledge to another person only if he found that person fit to receive.

== Honours ==
=== Baptist World Alliance ===
In the year 1955, Tiwari gave a talk on "We Preach Christ the Crucified Saviour" in London during the Golden Jubilee Celebrations of the Baptist World Alliance.

=== Senate of Serampore College (University) ===
India's first university, the Senate of Serampore College (University) in West Bengal conferred upon him a Doctor of Divinity, honoris causa in the year 1995.

== See also ==
- D. S. Amalorpavadass
- Victor Premasagar
