= J. T. Krogh =

Danish missionary (1919–1980)

Johannes Thoft Krogh (J. T. Krogh)
- Born: 29 January 1919; Tønning Parish, Denmark
- Died: 22 October 1980 (aged 61); Rønne
- Burial place: Østerlars, Denmark
- Education: Horsens State School (1937); Copenhagen University, (1944)
- Occupation: Theologian

Ecclesiastical career
- Church: Danish Santal Mission/Northern Evangelical Lutheran Church
- Congregations: Allinge-Sandvig churches on Bornholm.
- Offices held: Pastor, Moltrup-Bjerning (1945–1946), Rector, Kaerabani Santal High School, Kaerabani (1947–1948), Missionary, Assam (1948–1953), Principal, Santal Theological Seminary, Benagaria (1953–1972), Associate Registrar, Senate of Serampore College (1972–1975), Registrar, Senate of Serampore College (1975–1978)
- Title: The Reverend Doctor

Johannes Thoft Krogh (29 January 1919 – 22 October 1980) was the registrar of India's first University, the Senate of Serampore College, who was in office from 1975 through 1978.

As a missionary of the Northern Evangelical Lutheran Church, Krogh was one of the editors of the weekly, Pera Hoor which was published from 1922 in Santali language.

== Education ==
Krogh was educated at the State School in Horsens where he studied until 1937 and then at the Copenhagen University where he graduated in 1944 as a Candidate of Theology.

== Ecclesiastical ministry ==
=== Jharkhand ===
Krogh first came to India in 1947 as a Missionary of the Lutheran Church of Denmark and was Rector of the Kaerabani Santal High School in Benagaria, now under Dumka District in Jharkhand. He was then assigned to Assam from where he returned in 1953 to build up the Santal Theological Seminary (now Santal Theological College) and was Principal until 1972. Krogh made significant contribution to the Seminary ensuring affiliation of the Seminary sometime between 1963 and 1965 to the Senate of Serampore College. Krogh's efforts at the College fructified and many of his students have made significant contribution to the Church in India. Timotheas Hembrom, who happened to be one of Krogh's students, became an Old Testament Scholar.

=== Assam ===
From 1948 to 1953, Krogh was Missionary in Gauranga, Kokrajhar district, as well as Bongaigaon in Assam and returned in academics when he went back to Jharkhand to take up the Principalship of the Santal Theological College.

=== West Bengal ===
From 1972 onwards, Krogh was made Associate Registrar of the Senate of Serampore College where he worked along with C. Devasahayam, then Registrar and in the ensuing years, Krogh was made full charge of the Registrarship as Devasahayam went on leave from 1975 to 1978 as Pastor of the Lower Circular Road Baptist Chapel founded by William Carey in Kolkata.

=== Honours ===
In 1968, Krogh was made a Council Member of the Senate of Serampore College along with C. D. Jathanna. On Krogh's departure from India in 1978, the Senate of Serampore College conferred an honorary Doctor of Divinity degree by honoris causa.

Academic offices
Preceded by C. Devasahayam, CBCNC; 1960–1975	Registrar, Senate of Serampore College (University); 1975–1978	Succeeded by D. S. Satyaranjan, IPC; 1978–2004
