= Hembram =

Abusama also spelled as Hembrom; is a surname found in India. It is also an exogamous clan (paris) of the Santal and an exogamous clan (kili) of the Bhumij and Ho people. Notable people with the surname include:

- Arjun Charan Hembram, Indian writer in the Santali language and a banker
- Basanti Hembram, Indian politician
- Bateshwar Hembram, Ind, Indian politician
- Kali Charan Hembram (born 1960), Indian writer in the Santali language
- Kunar Hembram, Indian politician
- Purnima Hembram (born 1993), Indian sprinter and heptathlete
- Saraswati Hembram, Indian politician
- Sarojini Hembram (born 1959), Indian politician
- Seth Hembram, Indian politician
- Shyam Sundar Hembram, Indian writer in the Santali language
- Sweety Sima Hembram, Indian politician
- Lobin Hembrom, Indian politician
- Putkar Hembrom, Indian politician
- Ruby Hembrom, Indian publisher
- Lal Hembrom, Indian politician
- Timotheas Hembrom, Indian scholar
