= Siga Arles =

Indian missiologist

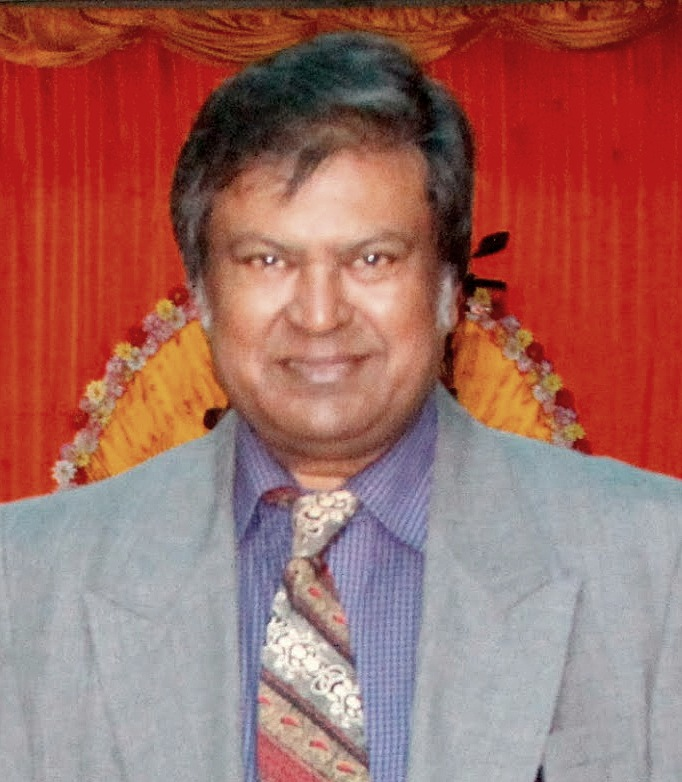

Director of Centre for Contemporary Christianity

Personal details
- Born: Siga Arles; 12 November 1950
- Died: 5 June 2015 (aged 64)
- Spouse(s): Nalini Arles, Professor of Pastoral Care at United Theological College, Bangalore
- Children: Naveen Arles, Sandesh Arles
- Education: University of Aberdeen
- Profession: Academic, Theologian

Siga Arles (12 November 1950 – 5 June 2015) was an Indian missiologist and founder of the Centre for Contemporary Christianity (Bangalore, India).

== Biography ==
Arles completed his BSc from University of Mysore, followed by an M.Div. and an MAR from Asbury Theological Seminary. In 1990, he completed a Ph.D. at the University of Aberdeen at the Centre for the Study of Christianity in the Non-Western World, where he co-studied with G. D. V. Prasad, then pursuing doctoral studies in the same university in the discipline of Old Testament.

In his academic career, he served as the vice-principal and head of the department of theology at North India Institute of Post Graduate Theological Studies, as theological secretary of Evangelical Fellowship of India, as dean of Consortium for Indian Missiological Education, and as founder and director of the Centre for Contemporary Christianity. From 2002 to 2008, he also served as co-editor of Journal of Asian Evangelical Theology, a journal of the Asia Theological Association based in Singapore.

Arles died on June 5, 2015, of a heart attack.

== Works ==
- Arles, Siga (1991). Theological Education for the Mission of the Church in India, 1947-1987. Frankfurt: Peter Lang. ISBN 9783631441299.
- Arles, Siga (2006). Missiological Education: An Indian Exploration. Bangalore: Centre for Contemporary Christianity. ISBN 978-81-902294-7-0.

Educational offices
Preceded by Timotheas Hembrom, NELC	Registrar, North India Institute of Post Graduate Theological Studies, Kolkata/Serampore	Succeeded by V. J. John, MMTSC

== See also ==
- Centre for the Study of World Christianity
- North India Institute of Post Graduate Theological Studies
