= Prabhudas Sunil Tirkey =

Indian Lutheran bishop

The Most Reverend Prabhudas Sunil Tirkey
- Native name: प्रभुदास सुनील तिर्की
- Church: Lutheran
- See: N.W.G.E.L.Church
- Appointed: 1997
- In office: 1997-2007
- Predecessor: Rev.Nirmal Minz
- Successor: Rev.Nirdosh Lakra

Prabhudas Sunil Tirkey was an Indian Lutheran bishop who served as the second bishop of North Western Gossner Evangelical Lutheran Church from 1997 to 2007.
