= Gladson Dungdung =

Indian human rights activist (born 1980)

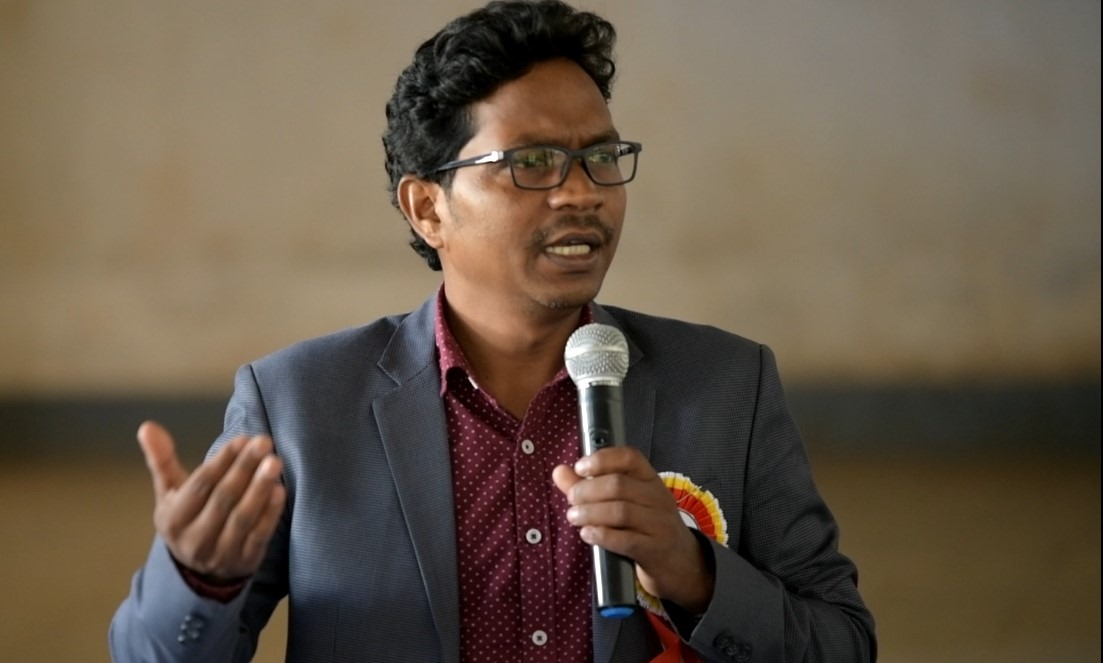
- Born: 2 May 1980 (age 46); Simdega, Jharkhand, India
- Citizenship: Indian
- Education: PG in Human Rights
- Occupations: Activist, researcher, writer
- Organization(s): Adivasi Publications, Adivasi Hunkar and Jharkhand Human Rights Movement
- Known for: Activism and writing
- Awards: Samata Ratana Award 2014

Gladson Dungdung (born 2 May 1980) is an Indian human rights activist researcher, writer, motivator and public speaker based in Ranchi, India. He is founder of the Adivasis Publications, Adivasis Hunkar and Jharkhand Human Rights Movement.

== Life ==
He comes from the Kharia Adivasi community in Jharkhand. His family was displaced in 1980, for an irrigation project built at the Chhinda River in Simdega, Jharkhand. His parents were killed in June 1990 while going to attend the civil court in Simdega, following a land-related dispute with another family.

Dungdung was unable to get admission in the college for lack of Rs. 250. He worked as daily wage labourer, cycle mechanic and helper in a tea shop.

He was one of the first authors published by Adivaani with the English language book Whose Country is it Anyway?, launched in 2013 at the New Delhi World Book Fair.

He has spoken internationally on human rights issues, including police atrocities and gross violation of the rights of indigenous peoples.

== Issues with the government ==
His passport was taken in January 2014, following "a sensitive report from state police" related to his travel to Germany and Thailand to speak at conferences organized by Adivasi Koordination and Asia Indigenous Peoples Pact.. He reported refusing to pay bribes during his passport application process. In May 2016, he was also offloaded from a Delhi-London Air India flight, on his way to attend an international seminar highlighting the situation of Adivasis.

In 2016, his bank account with the State Bank of India was blocked in alleged suspicious of his involvement in money laundering. In June 2017, two cases were filed against him for protesting against the amendment of Chotanagpur Tanacy Act 1908 and Santhal Pargana Tanacy Act 1949, falsely accusing him for instigating the Adivasis for protesting against the Jharkhand government.

== Books ==
He is the author of more than two dozen books, which includes:

- Adivasis and Their Forest
- Endless Cry in the Red Corridor
- Mission Saranda: A War for Natural Resources in India
- Whose country is it Anyway? – Untold Stories from India's Indigenous Peoples
- Crossfire
- Asuron Ki Pida
- Adivasi aur Vanadhikar
- Vikas Ke Kabargah
- Jharkhand main Asmita Sangharsh
- Ulgulan Ka Sauda

He has edited two others: Nagri Ka Nagara and Jharkhand Human Rights Report, 2001-2011. He has also written articles focused on human rights issues, Adivasi rights, displacement, politics and social change.

== Speeches ==
He has spoken at international seminars and conferences.

He served as an honorary member in the Assessment and Monitoring Authority under the Planning Commission of India (Govt. of India) from May 2011 to April 2013, and was awarded the Samata Ratan Award, 2014, for his extraordinary work for the Adivasi communities of India.
