= Rajiw Satish Toppo =

Indian Bishop

The Most Reverend Rajiw Satish Toppo
- Archbishop of N.W.G.E.L.Church
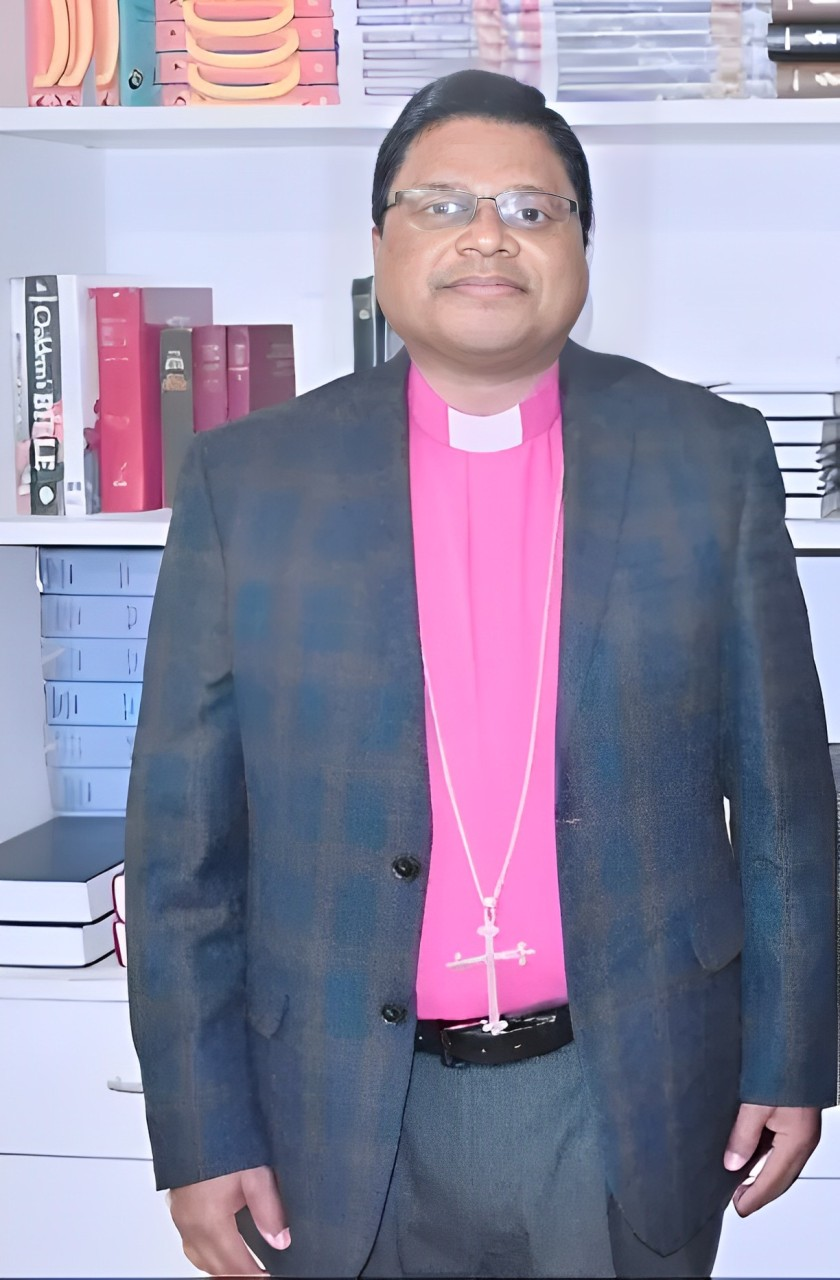
- Church: Lutheran
- Diocese: Central Diocese
- See: N.W.G.E.L.Church
- Appointed: 24 January 2022
- In office: 2022-present
- Predecessor: Dular Lakra
- Successor: Incumbent

Orders
- Consecration: 24 January 2024
- Rank: Archbishop

Personal details
- Born: India
- Denomination: Lutheran

Rev. Rajiw Satish Toppo is an Indian Lutheran Bishop who serves as the Archbishop of North Western Gossner Evangelical Lutheran Church since 24 January 2022.

== Early life ==
Previously he was the principal of Navin Doman Theological College Malar.

On 24 January 2022 He became the Archbishop of North Western Gossner Evangelical Lutheran Church.

He is the president of Bible Society of India of Ranchi Auxiliary.
