= Adivaani =

Indian fact-checking website

- Founded: 2012
- Headquarters: Kolkata, {{{location_country}}}
- Founder: Ruby Hembrom
- Products: Books
- Website: adivaani.org

Adivaani (stylised as adivaani, in lower case) is a media platform that aims to support indigenous expression and assertion, based in Kolkata, India. It is a publishing, archiving and chronicling outfit of and by India's Adivasi tribes.

== History ==
After attending a four-month publishing course in 2012, Ruby Hembrom started Adivaani on realising the absence, invisibility, and erasure of tribal representation in media, curriculum, and societal discourse. It was registered as a non-governmental organization on 19 July 2012.

Adivaani is a combination of Sanskrit word 'adi' meaning 'first', 'original', 'ancient' or 'earliest', and 'vaani' meaning 'voice'. Adivaani translates to the 'first voices'. Adivaani is the first publishing outfit of and by indigenous people of India to publish in the English language, Hembrom co-opted two others to collaborate with, one of whom still remains with Adivaani as a volunteer.

== Work ==
Adivaani aims to document and disseminate knowledge systems (tangible and intangible cultural facets) of the Adivasis in multiple languages, including English. Thereby, making indigenous knowledge and history accessible to indigenous communities.

=== Books ===
Adivaani's first two books were released at the New Delhi World Book Fair 2013: Gladson Dungdung's Whose Country is it anyway? and, Ruby Hembrom and Boski Jain's We Come from the Geese. Within a year, it had published 19 books, including to anthologies.

=== Movies ===
Adivaani made a documentary film on the making and playing of the Santhal lute and fiddle, the banam.
