= Nirdosh Lakra =

Lutheran Bishop

The Most Reverend Rt. Rev. Nirdosh Lakra
- Church: Lutheran
- See: N.W.G.E.L.Church
- In office: 2007-2013
- Predecessor: Rev. Prabhudas Sunil Tirkey
- Successor: Rev.Dular Lakra

Orders
- Ordination: 9 June 1978

Personal details
- Born: Kitam, Aamgao
- Denomination: Christianity
- Residence: Hehal, Ranchi
- Parents: Dhankuar Lakra (father)
- Spouse: Sorina Lakra
- Children: 3

Rev. Nirdosh Lakra was an Indian Lutheran bishop who served as the third Bishop of North Western Gossner Evangelical Lutheran Church from 2007 to 2013.
