= Joseph Pathrapankal =

Indian theologian (1930–2022)

- Born: 29 September 1930; Kerala
- Died: 27 February 2022
- Education: Jnana-Deepa Vidyapeeth, Pune (B.Th.); Jnana-Deepa Vidyapeeth, Pune (M.Th.); Pontifical Biblical Institute, Rome (L.S.S.); Gregorian University, Rome (S.T.D.)
- Church: Carmelites of Mary Immaculate
- Ordained: 24 March 1958
- Writings: See Section
- Title: Reverend Father Doctor

Joseph Pathrapankal (29 September 1930 – 27 February 2022) was an Indian New Testament Scholar and Syro-Malabar priest belonging to the Carmelites of Mary Immaculate.

He first studied at the Jnana-Deepa Vidyapeeth in Pune and then went to the Pontifical Biblical Institute where he obtained a licentiate in sacred scripture in 1960. He then became a lecturer then professor of New Testament, and from 1976 to 1979 and 1979 to 1985 the vice-president and president at Dharmārām Vidya Kshetram (DVK), Bengaluru. On 30 May 1997 Pathrapankal received an honorary doctorate from the faculty of theology at Uppsala University, Sweden.

Pathrapankal was also a member of the Pontifical Biblical Commission.

He was a former past president of the Society for Biblical Studies in India, and a member of the Studiorum Novi Testamenti Societas.

== Writings ==
- Time and History: Biblical and Theological Studies

Pathrapankal again left for Rome on study leave and registered as a doctoral candidate with the Gregorian University and pursued research in New Testament studies and submitted a thesis titled Metanoia, Faith, Covenant: A Study of Pauline Theology which was later published by Dharmārām Vidya Kshetram in 1971. Pathrapankal returned to India and continued teaching at Dharmārām Vidya Kshetram.

Professional and academic associations
Preceded by E. C. John, CSI; 1970-1972	President, Society for Biblical Studies in India; 1972–1974	Succeeded by Victor Premasagar, CSI; 1974-1975
Educational offices
Preceded by -	President, Dharmārām Vidya Kshetram, Bengaluru; 1979–1985	Succeeded by -
