= Khutitoli =

Village in Jharkhand, India

Coordinates: 22.6444°N 84.5104°E

Khutitoli is a village in Simdega district of Jharkhand state of India.
