= Simone Daro Gossner =

Belgian-American astronomer

Simone Daro Gossner (1920–2002) was a Belgian-American astronomer specializing in eclipses at the Nautical Almanac Office of the United States Naval Observatory.

== Life ==
Simone Daro was born on April 20, 1920, in Belgium, and was educated in Brussels. After the universities in Brussels were shut down in the German occupation of Belgium during World War II, she became an underground teacher, and was brought to Radcliffe College in 1946, through a program of the American Association of University Women to bring young women in war-torn parts of Europe to study in the US. She continued at Harvard University as a student of Harlow Shapley, and in 1947 married Joseph L. Gossner, another astronomer. She moved from Harvard to the Nautical Almanac Office in 1950, and worked there until 1961.

She appeared on NBC Television in 1959, in their Wisdom program, talking with Harlow Shapley in the episode "A Conversation with Dr. Harlow Shapley". She also contributed to the popularization of astronomy, as astronomy editor for Nature magazine and later for Natural History magazine.

Gossner died in 2002.

== Recognition ==
Gossner was named a Fellow of the American Association for the Advancement of Science in 1958.
