= Gabriele Dietrich =

Sociology Professor

- Born: 1943; Wedding, Berlin, Germany
- Citizenship: Germany (1943–1990); India (1990–present)

Academic background
- Influences: Professor Jacob Taubes, M. M. Thomas

Academic work
- Discipline: Feminism and Sociology
- Main interests: Sociology

Gabriele Dietrich (born 1943) is a German-born Indian scholar and philosopher. She is the Sociology Professor at the Tamil Nadu Theological Seminary, Madurai, affiliated to the nation's first University, the Senate of Serampore College (University).

== Early life ==
Dietrich grew up in Germany during the post-Second World War period in a disarrayed atmosphere. She emigrated to India in 1972 and is based in Madurai. Dietrich became a naturalised Indian citizen in 1990.

== Studies ==
In various stages of her study life, Dietrich went through the Universities of Marburg, Münster and Heidelberg. She had done her research at the Free University of Berlin on Aztec religion.

== Researcher/Teacher ==
Dietrich first came to India in 1971 as a Researcher to the Christian Institute of Study of Religion and Society (CISRS), Bangalore during the Directorship of M. M. Thomas. After an extended stint with the CISRS, she left for Germany in 1973. On invitation from the Tamil Nadu Theological Seminary in 1975, she returned to India to take up a teaching assignment at the Seminary where she currently teaches.

== Writings ==
- 1971, Tod und Jenseits in der aztekischen Religion (in German),
- 1977, Religion and people's organisation in east Thanjavur,
- 1977, The Challenge of the Word,
- 1988, Women's Movement in India: Conceptual and Religious Reflections,
- 1992, Reflections on the women's movement in India: religion, ecology, development,
- 1998, Towards Understanding Indian Society,
- 2001, A new thing on earth: hopes and fears facing feminist theology : theological ruminations of a feminist activist,
- 2004, On reading the signs of the times,

== Honours ==
In 2004, an 11-member committee coordinated by Lalrinawmi Ralte of the United Theological College, Bangalore brought out a festschrift in honour of Dietrich entitled Waging Peace, Building a World in which Life Matters: Festschrift to Honour Gabriele Dietrich.
