= Anthony Raymond Ceresko =

American theologian (1899–1965)

- Born: August 20, 1942; Detroit, Michigan, United States
- Died: August 13, 2005 (aged 62); Tagaytay, Philippines
- Other name: Anthony Ceresko
- Education: Niagara University, Lewiston; The Catholic University of America, Washington, D.C.; Pontifical Biblical Institute, Rome
- Parent(s): Mother: Mrs. Mary Elizabeth Tyrie Ceresko; Father: Dr. Anthony
- Church: Roman Catholic Church; Oblates of St. Francis de Sales
- Ordained: 12 September 1970
- Writings: See Contents - 3.Writings
- Offices held: Professor of Old Testament
- Title: Reverend Doctor

Notes
- Data as of March 2009

Anthony Raymond Ceresko (1942–2005) was an Old Testament scholar.

== History ==
Ceresko was born in Detroit, Michigan, USA, on 20 August 1942. After completing studies at the local Salesian High School in Detroit, Ceresko entered the Oblates of St. Francis de Sales in Childs, Maryland and was professed on 21 August 1962.

== Studies ==
He studied at the Niagara University, Lewiston, New York, and graduated in 1967. Ceresko was later sent to The Catholic University of America, Washington, D.C., in 1970 where he studied Bachelor of Sacred Theology (STB) and Licentiate of Sacred Theology (STL).

Ceresko obtained a doctorate from the Pontifical Biblical Institute. His thesis was Job 29:31 in the light of Northwest Semitic - A Translation and Philological Commentary.

== Writings ==
- Job 29:31 in the light of Northwest Semitic - A Translation and Philological Commentary
- Introduction to the Old Testament: a Liberation Perspective
- Introduction to Old Testament Wisdom - A Spirituality for Liberation

== Teacher ==
Ceresko first taught at the SS. Cyril and Methodius Seminary in Orchard Lake, Michigan. He later moved to Canada and was Professor of Scripture at University of St. Michael's College in Toronto.

In 1991, Ceresko moved to India and was Professor of Old Testament at St. Peter's Pontifical Seminary in Bengaluru. In 1999, Ceresko volunteered to teach in the Divine Word Seminary in Tagaytay, Philippines.

== Scholarship ==
Along with Thomas P. Wahl, Ceresko co-edited the notes on Zephaniah, Nahum, Habakkuk in the second edition of the New Jerome Biblical Commentary, and wrote the notes on Jonah.

Ceresko's other journal articles include:

- "The Function of 'Order' (Sedeq) and 'Creation' in the Book of Proverbs with Some Implications for Today".
- "The Rhetorical Strategy of the Fourth Servant Song (Isaiah 52:13-53:12): Poetry and the Exodus-New Exodus"
- "The Abcs of Wisdom in Psalm xxxiv"
- "A Note on Psalm 63: A Psalm of Vigil"
- "A Poetic Analysis of Ps 105, with Attention to Its Use of Irony"
- "Prayers for Times of Distress"
- "Psalm 121: A Prayer of a Warrior?"
- "Psalm 149: Poetry, Themes (Exodus and Conquest), and Social Function"
- "The Sage in the Psalms." The Sage in Israel and the Ancient near East"
- "The Function of Chiasmus in Hebrew Poetry"
- "St. Francis de Sales - Spiritual Directory for a New Century: Re-interpreting the Direction of Intention"
- "To reward them afterwards - Eschatology and St. Francis de Sales - Direction of Intention or Right Intending of Deeds"

Academic offices
Preceded by	Professor of Old Testament Divine Word Seminary, Tagaytay; 1999-2005	Succeeded by
Preceded by	Professor of Old Testament St. Peter's Pontifical Seminary, Bengaluru; 1991-1999	Succeeded by
