= Johannes Gossner =

German divine and philanthropist

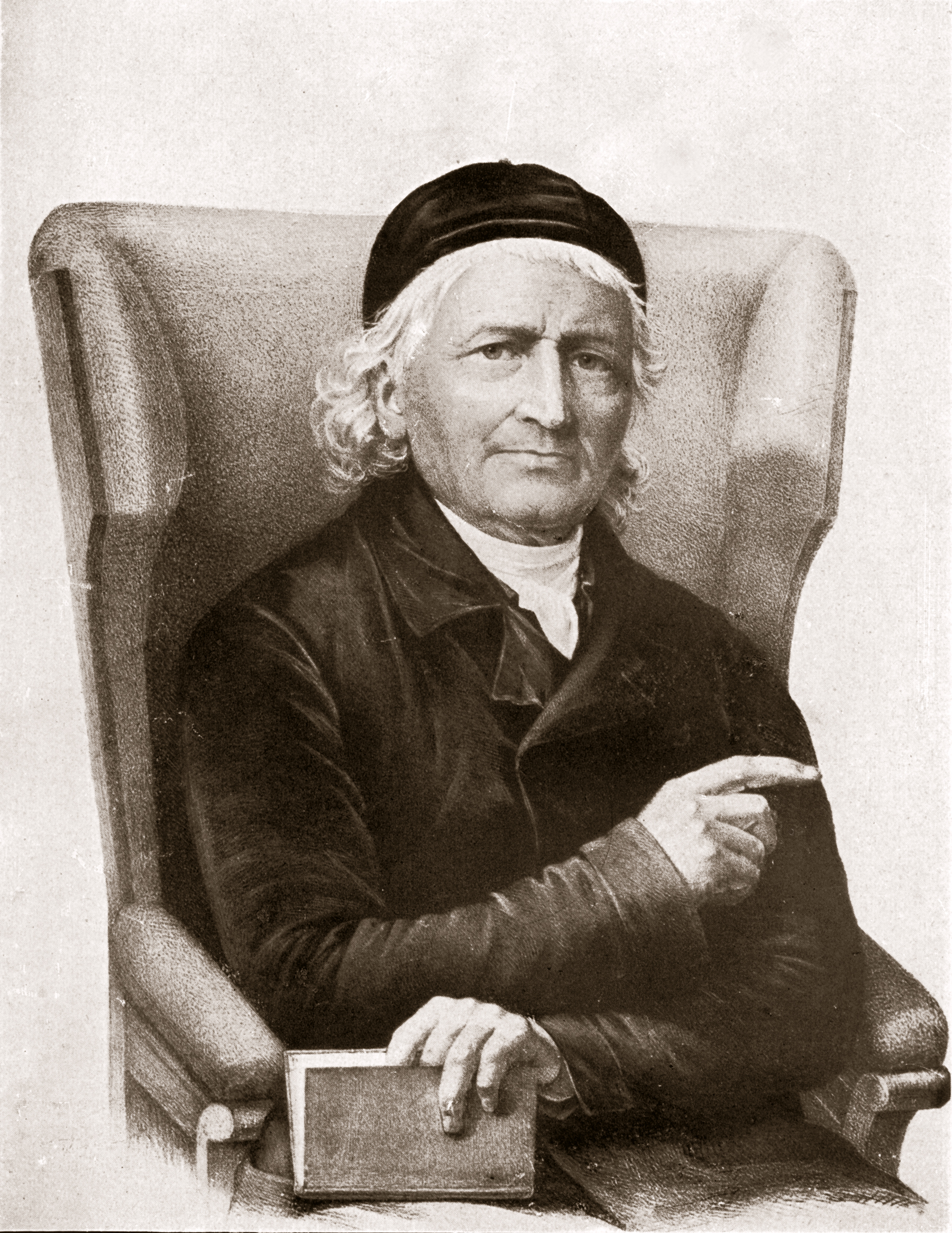
Johannes Gossner

Johannes Evangelista Gossner (14 December 1773 – 20 March 1858), German divine and philanthropist, was born at Hausen near Augsburg.

He was educated at the University of Dillingen, where he studied for priesthood with two years course of Philosophy, and Physics in 1791. He, like Martin Boos and others, came under the spell of the Evangelical movement promoted by Johann Michael Sailer, the professor of pastoral theology. He moved to Neuburg in the 1790s where he was influenced by the movement of revival in South Bavaria known as "The Awakening".

After taking priests' orders, Gossner held livings at Dirlewang (1804-1811) and Munich (1811-1817). His evangelical tendencies led to difficulties when he was taken to church court in 1802 and eventually brought about his dismissal. In 1826 he formally left the Roman Catholic for the Protestant communion. As Reformed (Calvinist) minister of Bethlehem's Church (1829-1846), a Lutheran and Reformed simultaneum in Berlin, he was conspicuous not only for practical and effective preaching, but for the founding of schools, asylums and missionary agencies.

In 1836, he founded the Gossner Mission, which aimed for a holistic understanding of mission (preaching the gospel and church social service). Its purpose was “to train young men from the craftsman class and every other class in a shorter and less expensive way than usual to become assistants in the mission, to become deacons, catechists, school teachers and collaborators in the holy work.” They have to work in “apostolic, unbound and humble simplicity”, following the example of the congregation of the Moravian Church “under the presidency of Jesus Christ.“ Missionaries were initially sent out to Australia. This missionary work is still active today in Germany and, among other places, in India and Nepal.

Lives of Gossner were written by Bethmann Hollweg (Berlin, 1858) and Hermann Dalton (Berlin, 1878).

== Works ==
- John Goszner's Treasury: Bible Meditations for Each Day in the Year, With Devotional Songs to the Furtherance of Family Prayer and Piety
- The Heart of Man: Either a Temple of God, Or a Habitation of Satan : Represented in Ten Emblematical Figures, Calculated to Awaken and Promote a Christian Disposition
- The Spiritual Casket of Daily Bible Meditations; for the Furtherance of Family Godliness and Devotion
- Protestant House Pulpit
- The Bohemian Martyrs and Emigrants (1831)
- Die Biene auf dem Missionsfeld ("The bee on the mission field") (Mission Journal)

== Sources ==
- Werner Raupp (Ed.): Mission in Quellentexten. Geschichte der Deutschen Evangelischen Mission von der Reformation bis zur Weltmissionskonferenz Edinburgh 1910, Erlangen/Bad Liebenzell 1990 (ISBN 3-87214-238-0 / 3-88002-424-3), S. 258-261 (Sources from the founding period, incl. Introd. and Lit.).

== See also ==
- Gossner Theological College
- Gossner Evangelical Lutheran Church in Chotanagpur and Assam
- North Western Gossner Evangelical Lutheran Church
