= Kuzhivelil Mathew =

Indian biblical scholar

The Reverend K. V. Mathew, MMTSC B.D., M.Th. (Serampore), Ph.D. (Edinburgh)
- Born: Kuzhuvelil Varkey Mathew; 2 November 1931 (age 94); Keezhuvaipur, Kingdom of Travancore
- Other names: K. V. Mathew Ayyagaru
- Citizenship: Travancore (1931–1947); India (1947–Present)
- Education: B.D. (Serampore), M. Th. (Serampore), Ph.D. (Edinburgh)
- Alma mater: C. M. S. College Kottayam (Kerala); Serampore College, Serampore (West Bengal); University of Hamburg, Hamburg (Germany); University of Edinburgh, Edinburgh (Scotland)
- Occupation: Priesthood
- Years active: 1955-Present
- Known for: Old Testament exegesis
- Parent(s): Smt. Rachel and Sri K. T. Varkey
- Religion: Christianity
- Church: Malankara Mar Thoma Syrian Church
- Ordained: 1955 by Juhanon Mar Thoma XVIII
- Congregations served: Mylom (1955-56), Calcutta (1958-60), Ranni (1994-97)
- Offices held: President, Society for Biblical Studies in India (1983 & 1994); Secretary, Malankara Mar Thoma Syrian Church (1987-90); Spiritual Formator; Serampore College, Serampore (1956-57, 1960-71, 1999, 2008); Mar Thoma Theological Seminary, Kottayam (1971-94); Aizawl Theological College, Aizawl (1997); Federated Faculty for Research in Religion and Culture, Traivandrum/Kottayam (1980-Present); Dharma Jyoti Vidyapeeth, Faridabad (2000-2002)
- Title: The Reverend Doctor

Kuzhuvelil Varkey Mathew (born 2 November 1931) is an Indian biblical scholar and a member of the Society for Biblical Studies in India.

== Education ==
Kuzhuvelil Varkey Mathew was born in Keezhuvaipur in Kerala to Rachel and K. T. Varkey. Mathew studied at the local CMS High School in Mallapally in Pathanamthitta District and later underwent pre-university studies at the CMS College in Kottayam.

After Mathew expressed his interest in pursuing studies in divinity, the Malankara Mar Thoma Syrian Church then headed by Juhanon Mar Thoma (Mar Thoma XVIII) sent him to Serampore College, Serampore where he pursued graduate studies in theology from 1951 to 1954.

The Malankara Mar Thoma Syrian Church ordained Mathew as a clergyman in 1955 and he became a vicar in Mylom.

After a year, Mathew returned to Serampore College from 1956 to 1957. He then studied at the United Theological College, Bengaluru in the ensuing academic year to pursue post-graduate studies in Biblical Studies leading to his M. Th. in Old Testament Studies. In doing this, he became the first Indian to pursue a post-graduate course in Old Testament studies at the Senate of Serampore College (University) Mathew studied Old Testament under Professor Norman Henry Snaith, then a visiting professor at the seminary.

== Career ==
From 1958 to 1960 Mathew was Vicar of the Mar Thoma Parish in Calcutta.

Mathew began teaching Old Testament studies at Serampore College, a constituent College of the Senate of Serampore College (University), Serampore from 1960 until 1971 when his parent Church, the Malankara Mar Thoma Syrian Church recalled him to Kottayam for the purpose of teaching Old Testament studies in the Mar Thoma Theological Seminary. Mathew's teaching colleagues included Y. D. Tiwari. His students included Paulose Mar Paulose, D. S. Satyaranjan, S. Jeyapaul David, James Massey and G. Babu Rao, who returned to Serampore to teach Old Testament from 1974.

In 1981, Mathew was made Principal of the Mar Thoma Theological Seminary and continued in that position till 1986.

Mathew was also on the panel of Professors under the Federated Faculty for Research in Religion and Culture (FFRRC), Kerala and served as a guide to post-graduate and doctoral students. In 2000, he was invited by the Mar Thoma Syrian Church of Malabar (Delhi Diocese) to serve as the Principal of Dharma Jyoti Vidyapeeth {affiliated to the Senate of Serampore College (University)}, Faridabad. Mathew ran the institution until 2002.

After two decades of teaching in the Seminary in Kottayam, Mathew was made the Secretary of the Malankara Mar Thoma Syrian Church in 1987 continuing till 1990 under Metropolitan Alexander Mar Thoma (Mar Thoma XIX).

The Society for Biblical Studies in India was constituted by Biblical Scholars to foster Biblical scholarship in relation to the Indian context. Mathew was twice elected as its president in 1983 and 1994.

== Publications ==
- Ancient Religions of the Fertile Crescent and the Sanatana Dharma
- Trinity-Semantic Considerations
- The Concept of God and Nature in the Psalms
- The Hermeneutical Struggle in India
- Indigenisation: An Old Testament Perspective
- The faith and practice of the Mar Thoma Church
- Walking humbly with God : A Biography of the Rev. C. E. Abraham
- Ecological Perspectives in the Book of Psalms
- Crisis and Hope in Israel's Exile
- Dr. M. M. Thomas - A Grateful Memory
- Last Supper - A Kingdom Perspective
- Ecology and Faith in the Old Testament

Mathew also edited the One-Volume Bible Commentary in Malayalam. He worked with Chief Editor E. C. John.

== Higher studies ==
Mathew travelled to the University of Edinburgh, in Scotland in the academic year 1962 to 1963. He enrolled to pursue doctoral studies in the field of Old Testament studies under Professors G. W. Anderson, N. W. Porteous and R. E. Clements. In 1964 and 1968, Mathew returned to Serampore to take up his teaching again.

He left the college again in 1968 to spend a year at the University of Hamburg, Germany under Klaus Koch. In the final phase of his doctoral research, he spent the final academic year (1969-1970) at the University of Edinburgh, Scotland and submitted a thesis on the topic God and Nature in the Book of Psalms. In doing so he became the first Indian to be awarded a doctorate by the Faculty of Theology of the University of Edinburgh, Scotland.

== Visiting scholar ==
After leaving the Seminary in Kottayam in 1994, Mathew spent three years as a Vicar of the Parish in Ranni.

In 1997, he was Visiting Professor at the Aizawl Theological College, Aizawl.

In 1999 and 2008, he was a guest professor at his alma mater in Serampore.

From 2000 to 2002 he took up the principalship of Dharma Jyoti Vidyapeeth in Faridabad.

== See also ==
- Y. D. Tiwari
- Klaus Koch
- S. J. Samartha
