= North Western Gossner Evangelical Lutheran Church =

Lutheran denomination in India

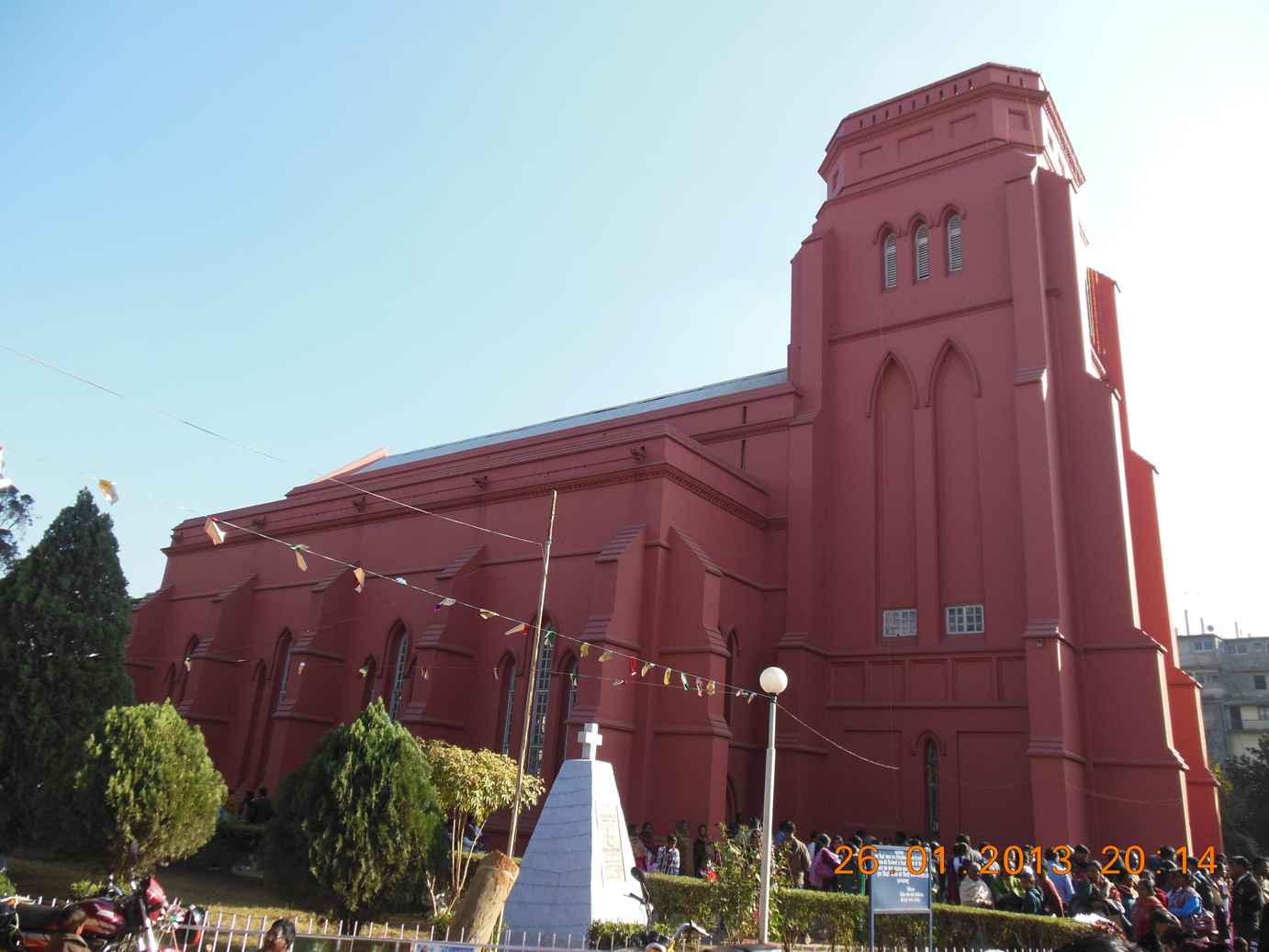
- North Western Gossner Evangelical Lutheran Church in India and Nepal.
- Classification: Protestant
- Orientation: Mainline Evangelical Lutheran
- Structure: Synod; Diocese; Parish; Congregations
- Leader: Rt.Rev.Rajiw Satish Toppo
- Associations: Bengal Christian Council; Bihar Council of Churches; Chhattisgarh Christian Council; Jharkhand Council of Churches; Madhya Pradesh Christian Council; Utkal Christian Council
- Region: India and Nepal
- Headquarters: Ranchi, Jharkhand
- Origin: 9 June 1850 (176 years ago)
- Congregations: 784
- Members: 135,000 + Baptized members
- Primary schools: 29
- Secondary schools: 15
- Official website: nwgelc.org

North Western Gossner Evangelical Lutheran Church (NWGEL Church) is the fourth largest Lutheran church in India. The NWGEL Church also has a presence in Nepal. Most NWGEL church members are from indigenous and tribal communities. NWGEL Church became an autonomous church on 10 July 1919. On 28 April 1989, the United Evangelical Lutheran Church in India gave provisional membership to NWGEL Church. NWGEL Church is a member of the National Council of Churches in India and local bodies such as Bengal Christian Council, Jharkhand Christian Council, Bihar Christian Council, and Chattishgarh Christian Council.

NWGEL Church undertook a partnership with the World Mission Prayer League (WMPL) in February 2005. WMPL is helping in developing the Multi-purpose Training Center near Ranchi.

== Ministry areas ==
The NWGEL Church has congregations in the states of Orissa, Assam, West Bengal, Jharkhand, Bihar, Chhattisgarh, New Delhi, Uttar Pradesh, Punjab, Madhya Pradesh, and Karnataka, with a presence in various state capitals such as New Delhi, Kolkata, Bangalore, Bhubaneswar, Bhopal, Raipur, Ranchi, and Patna. NWGEL Church has 3 dioceses, 73 parishes, and about 784 congregations.

The NWGEL Church also has eight congregations in Nepal, with the majority of the members there being from the Oraon tribe.

== Bishops (1980 onward) ==
Bishop	Installation date
1. Nirmal Minz	3 June 1980
2. Prabhudas Sunil Tirkey	1996
3. Nirdosh Lakra	11 November 2007
4. Dular Lakra	13 January 2013
5. Rajiw Satish Toppo	24 January 2022

== History ==
The Gossner Church was established in 1845 at Ranchi in the land of Chottanagpur. It is now in Jharkhand state separated from Bihar. It was the first church in the land of Chotanagpur at that time. The major part of the population was tribal people - Oraon, Munda, Kharia, and others. These people were very poor and innocent. They were exploited in several ways by the Jamindars (landlords) in many forms of cruel activity which made them flee to other cities of the country.

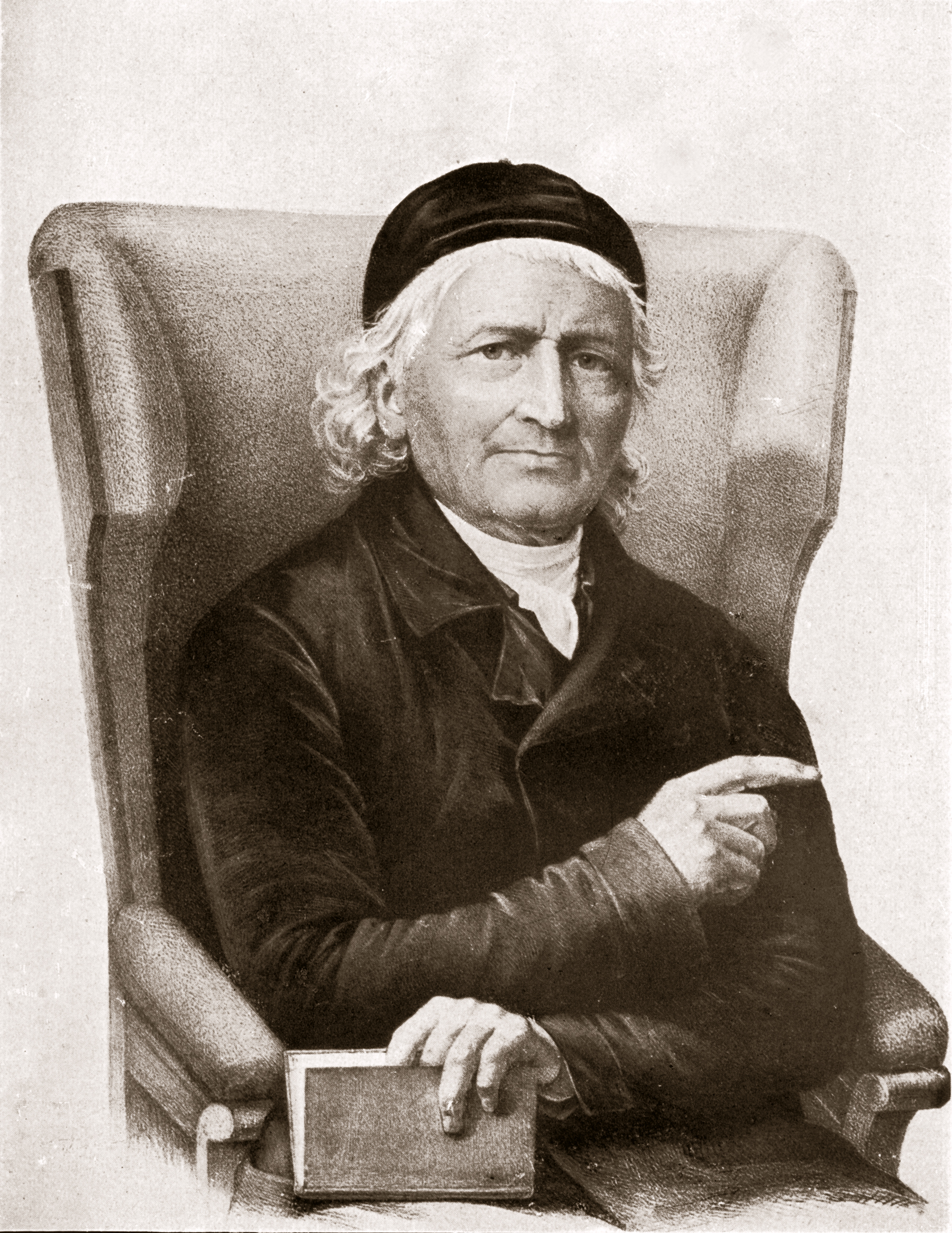
Johannes Gossner

The deputy commissioner of Chottanagpur at that time requested Dr. Hoeberline, the Secretary of Bible Society of India at Kolkata, to send missionaries to work among the tribal people of Chottanagpur.

As the church grew in number and regions, different models of administration were introduced from time to time with a view to providing equal representation to different regions of the church. However, it seems that the people of region were not given adequate and just representation and legitimate space for their voice and concerns. This fact is to be verified in the reality of difference over time within the church, which led to North Zone, Jubilee synod, Dharamprant for the question of regional justice and adequate representation finally led to the split of Gossner Church in 1977. At that time, Lutherans split into two churches: the North-Western Gossner Evangelical Lutheran Church (NWGELC) and the Gossner Evangelical Lutheran Church (GELC).

== Establishment ==
The missionaries reached Ranchi on 2 November 1845. They had already spent several months in Calcutta. They worked very hard for five years and there were many inquiries, but nobody accepted Jesus Christ, and as a result, the missionaries were very disappointed. The missionaries wanted permission to go to some other place for mission work, but Johannes Gossner, leader of the Gossner Mission, asked them to continue preaching and depending on the Holy Spirit in conversations in Chottanagpur. So the missionaries continued to preach.

After five years, four Oraon people, Doman Tirkey, Ghuran, Bandhu, and Kesko, found the pamphlet distributed by the missionaries and they were struck by the missionaries' claim in the pamphlet that Jesus is Lord and He is alive. They went to the missionaries and asked about Jesus. The missionaries and four Oraon people had many serious discussions about Jesus Christ and the missionaries answered many questions, but the four Oraon people struggled with one question: they wanted to see Jesus Christ face to face because the missionaries had claimed that Jesus is alive. Both the missionaries and the four seekers were frustrated on this question. When the missionaries could not convince the four seekers on the point that Jesus is alive, the four wanted to quit seeking Him. It was very difficult for the missionaries; after five years of dedicated work, they had four genuine seekers, people who wanted to see Jesus Christ before being baptized. Therefore, they requested that the seekers pray together before they went away. In this prayer with great burden and passion, something happened. The seekers said that they had seen Jesus and now they were ready to take baptism. Apparently, when the prayer ended, the Lord Jesus gave vision to the four seekers and they were convinced. These Oraon people were baptized on 9 June 1850.

== Autonomy ==
When World War I broke out in 1914 the Gossner mission faced another crisis. All the German missionaries returned to Germany and the church was without leadership. For four years there was great struggle in the church. The national missionary society tried to help the church. Their efforts finally led to the autonomy of the church on 10 July 1919. It is an important milestone in the history of the church that the ordinary people of the church took upon themselves the difficult responsibility of an independent church. The Gossner Church became one of the first three churches in Asia which attained autonomy as early as 1919. The autonomous church continued to grow under the leadership of tribal people of Chottanagpur.

== Women's ministry ==
On 15 November 2010, Chonhen Minz was appointed as the first woman priest of the NWGEL Church, Ranchi. She graduated from Ranchi University, and studied theology in Chennai from 1994 to 1998. Prior to her appointment, she was engaged in missionary work in the state of Chhattisgarh.

== Educational institutions ==
Institution Name	City	State	Est	Head
1. Navin Doman Theological College	Ranchi	Jharkhand	2005	Rev. Amol Ashish Kujur
2. Lutheran High School	Gumla	Jharkhand	-	Smt. Gita
3. Lutheran High School	Lohardaga	Jharkhand	-	Ms. Usha Kalen Minz
4. Lutheran High School	Ichkela	Chhattisgarh	-	Sri. Klimkite Kujur
5. Lutheran High School	Sarhapani	Chhattisgarh	1979	Sri. Titus Toppo
6. Lutheran High School	Kinkel	Jharkhand	-	Smt. Rose Romola Tirkey
7. Lutheran High School	Kochedega	Jharkhand	-	Smt. Gracy Minz
8. Lutheran High School	Bandarchuwa	Chhattisgarh	-	Sri. Nasrit TIgga
9. Joel Lakra High School	Ranikhatanga	Jharkhand	-	-
10. Gossner College	Simdega	Jharkhand	-	Sri. Ajit Toppo
11. Lutheran High School	Chainpur	Jharkhand	1947	Smt. Khusmaren Tirkey

== See also ==
- Gossner Evangelical Lutheran Church in Chotanagpur and Assam
