= Kadma, Khunti =

Coordinates: 24.2087°N 84.9226°E

Kadma is a village in Khunti district of Jharkhand state of India
