= Chetti Devasahayam =

The Reverend Doctor Chetti Devasahayam, CBCNC D. D. Honoris Causa (Northern)
- Born: 6 October 1913; Kakinada, Andhra Pradesh, India
- Died: 28 February 1993 (aged 79); Kolkata, West Bengal, India
- Education: CBM-McLaurin High School; Pithapuram Rajah College; Andhra University (B.Sc.); Serampore College (B.D.); Northern Baptist Theological Seminary (Th.M.)
- Occupations: Chaplain & Administrator
- Parent(s): The Rev. Chetti Bhanumurthy, CBCNC

Ecclesiastical career
- Church: Canadian Baptist Mission/Convention of Baptist Churches of Northern Circars
- Ordained: 1943
- Writings: 1974, The Role of Baptists in the Religious Future of India
- Offices held: Visakha Field Supervisor, Krishna Field Minister, Convention of Baptist Churches of Northern Circars (1939–1960); Military Chaplain, Royal Indian Navy (1942–1947); Registrar, Senate of Serampore College (University) (1960–1975); Pastor, Lower Circular Road Baptist Chapel, Kolkata (1968–1993)
- Title: The Reverend Doctor

Chetti Devasahayam (6 October 1913 – 28 February 1993) was the registrar of the nation's first university, the Senate of Serampore College (University) who was in office from 1960 through 1975. It was during Devasahayam's tenure at the University that ecumenism gave way to merger of seminaries and the formation of special purpose entities throughout India. It was Devasahayam who gave the inaugural address when the Andhra Christian Theological College was formed in 1964 in Rajahmundry.

== Studies ==
After scholastic studies at the CBM-McLaurin High School in Kakinada, Devasahayam enrolled for graduate studies from 1931–1933 at the Pithapuram Rajah College in Kakinada from where he obtained a degree in sciences leading to the award of Bachelor of Science (BSc) by the Andhra University. For ministerial formation, Devasahayam studied from 1936–1939 at Serampore College, Serampore as a candidate of the Canadian Baptist Mission/Convention of Baptist Churches of Northern Circars at the Serampore College, Serampore.

In Fall 1955, Devasahayam was sent by his Church Society for upgrading his academics at the Northern Baptist Theological Seminary, Lombard, Illinois where he enrolled for a postgraduate course in Master of Theology (Th.M.) completing it by May 1956.

== Christian work ==
After Devasahayam's ministerial studies at Serampore College, he was assigned pastoral roles in rural areas where there were hardly any Christians and much like the Baptist heritage, he was left to himself to build up congregations. From 1939 to 1942, he was Visakha Field Supervisor of the Canadian Baptist Mission.

At the height of the World War II, Devasahayam was asked to serve in the Royal Indian Navy as a Military Chaplain. Devasahayam was Military Chaplain from 1942 through 1947 and returned to Church ministry.

He returned to the Church Society in 1947 and subsequently ministered in parishes of Convention of Baptist Churches of Northern Circars from 1947 as Krishna Field Minister stationed at Avanigadda. During an overseas missionary visit to Canada in 1951, Devasahayam addressed a missionary meeting in Canada where many came from Okanagan, Kaleden, Peachland, Kelowna, and Vernon.

== University and Chapel ==
In 1960, Devasahayam was appointed registrar of the nation's first University. As Registrar, Devasahayam was also a member of the Council of Senate of Serampore College.

While performing his duties at the university, Devasahayam was an honorary pastor at Lower Circular Road Baptist Chapel in Kolkata, the chapel founded by William Carey. Devasahayam used to pastor the church from 1968 onwards and became a full-time Pastor of the Chapel in 1975, but it was not until 1978 that he resigned from the university.

Devasahayam was visiting professor at his alma mater, the Northern Baptist Theological Seminary during 1974–1975.

Academic offices
Preceded by William Stewart; 1954–1959	Registrar, Senate of Serampore College; 1960–1975	Succeeded by J. T. Krogh; 1975–1978
