= Gossner Theological College =

Coordinates: 23.356°N 85.326°E

Gossner Theological College is the only Theological Seminary of Jharkhand affiliated to Serampore College. It is owned by Gossner Evangelical Lutheran Church in Chotanagpur and Assam.

== History ==
The German missionaries sent by Fr. Johannes Evangelista Gossner from Berlin established the first Christian Church of the region in 1845 and a seminary in 1866 for the preparation of preachers, teachers and pastors.

During the First World War the seminary was closed, to be reopened in 1921. During the Second World War it was moved to Gobindpur and Lohardaga and back to Ranchi in 1948. With the initiative of the Late Rev. Dr. J.J.P. Tigga, sometime professor of the History of Christianity at Serampore College, it was affiliated to Serampore College in 1949. From that time it was known as Lutheran Theological College. The college was given the present campus in 1965 and from 1969 the L.Th. diploma was upgraded to B.Th Degree Course and from that time onwards this institution is known as Gossner Theological College.

== Programs and Degrees Offered ==
The college is offering BD Degree Courses both in Hindi and English under Senate of Serampore College.

== Facilities ==
The reconstruction of the college infrastructure began in 1974–1975 with the construction of new administrative building. This building has an auditorium, seminar rooms and library in addition to office and class rooms.

Separate hostels for men and women students are available with required facilities. New men's hostel with modern facilities accommodates students from August 2006 and plan for married students' quarters is underway.G.E.L.Church Archive is in process in the gossner Theological building.

== Administration and Staff ==
- Rev. Dr. C.S.A. Kerketta – principal
- Rev. Jayamasi Horo – Bursar
- Rev. G.S. Kerketta – Registrar
