= South Asia Theological Research Institute =

- SATHRI
- Type: Centre for advanced theological research
- Established: 1989; 36 years ago
- Dean: Dr. Aswathy John (Serampore)
- Location: Serampore, West Bengal, India
- Affiliations: Senate of Serampore College (University)
- Website: http://www.senateofseramporecollege.edu.in/wings-of-senate/sathri/

South Asia Theological Research Institute (SATHRI) is a doctoral research centre established by the Board of Theological Education of the Senate of Serampore College (BTESSC) in the year 1989. It is located at Mack House Complex in Serampore.

It offers doctoral programmes in theology.

== Background ==
In the eighties, the BTESSC and the Senate of Serampore College (University) saw the urgency to establish initially one advanced research centre in the country to:

- develop,
- coordinate, and
- facilitate

research at doctoral and non-degree levels emphasizing its indigenous and contextual character. Intense planning and negotiation led to the establishment of SATHRI in 1989 in Bangalore as the research wing of the BTESSC to deal with the promotion of contextualized research, both at the degree and the non-degree levels.

It was meant to strengthen centres for research and to promote basic tools for theological education, to involve in publication of research work and to arrange for programmes that would strengthen the relationship between the theological institutions for the purpose of research.

== Validation ==
- The Senate of Serampore College (University) was one of the first institutions in India to be given the status of a university in 1829.
- The Board of Theological Education of the Senate of Serampore College (BTESSC) established in 1975 is the theological arm under the Senate.
- SATHRI is the research wing under BTESSC established in 1989.

== Courses offered ==
Succession of Deans of SATHRI
- 1989-2000, The Rev. K. C. Abraham, Ph.D. (Princeton),
- 2000-2009, The Rev. Samson Prabhakar, Dr. Theol. (Berne),
- 2009-2011, The Rev. A. Wati Longchar, D.Th. (Serampore),
- 2011-2014, The Rev. H. Vanlalauva, D.Th. (Serampore),
- 2014-2018, The Rev. P. G. George, Th.D. (Toronto)
- 2018-present, The Rev. Limatula Longkumer, D. Th. (Serampore)

Doctor of Theology (Th.D.) in the fields of:

- Old Testament
- New Testament
- Theology and Ethics
- Women's Studies
- Dalit Theology
- Communication

== Administration ==
A Dean oversees the programmes of SATHRI under the supervision of a Committee on Research of the Senate of Serampore College (University).

== Journal ==
The SATHRI Journal is an occasional bulletin published by SATHRI.
