= Diocese of Mysore =

Diocese of Mysore may mean,

- Roman Catholic Diocese of Mysore,
- Church of South India Diocese of Mysore, trifurcated into,
  - Church of South India Karnataka Northern Diocese
  - Church of South India Karnataka Central Diocese
  - Church of South India Karnataka Southern Diocese
