= Devaraj Bangera =

- Bishop in Karnataka Southern Diocese of Church of South India
- Church: Christian
- Diocese: Karnataka Southern Diocese
- See: Church of South India
- In office: 2004–2009
- Predecessor: C. L. Furtado
- Successor: John S. Sadananda

Orders
- Consecration: 9 October 2004 by B. P. Sugandhar, Moderator and S. Vasantha Kumar, Deputy Moderator, Church of South India Synod

Personal details
- Born: Karnataka

Devaraj Bangera was the fourth Anglican Bishop - in - Karnataka Southern Diocese of Church of South India. It was on 9 October 2004 that Bangera was consecrated as Bishop - in - Karnataka Southern Diocese headquartered in Mangalore at Shanthi Cathedral, Mangalore by then Moderator, B. P. Sugandhar and Deputy Moderator, S. Vasantha Kumar in the presence of Christopher Asir, D. P. Shettian and C. L. Furtado.

Devaraj studied at the Karnataka Theological College, Mangalore during the Principalship of Robert Scheuermeier and submitted a thesis entitled Evangelization among the Muslims in 1967 leading to a Licentiate in Theology.

Religious titles
Preceded by C. L. Furtado; 1997-2004	Bishop - in - Karnataka Southern Diocese; Mangalore; Church of South India; 2004-2009	Succeeded by John S. Sadananda; 2009-2013
