= William Arthur Memorial Church, Gubbi =

William Arthur Memorial Church
- Wesleyan Mission Chapel, Gobbee
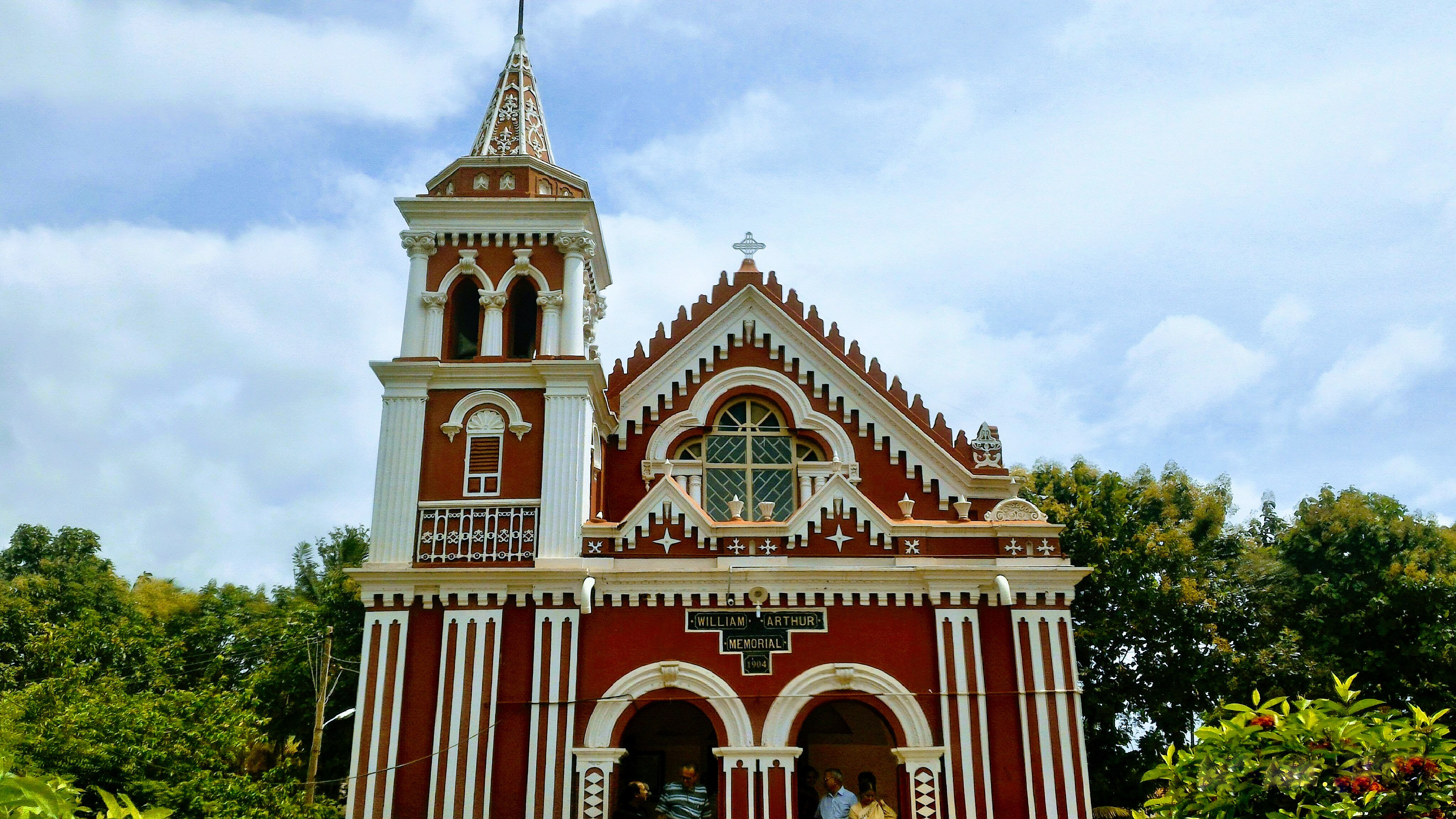
- William Arthur Memorial Church, Gubbi
- William Arthur Memorial Church
- 13°18′38″N 76°57′03″E
- Location: Gubbi
- Country: India
- Denomination: Church of South India
- Tradition: Wesleyan

History
- Former name: Gobbee Chapel
- Status: operational
- Consecrated: 1904

Architecture
- Style: English
- Completed: 1904

Administration
- Diocese: Karnataka Central Diocese

Clergy
- Bishop: Rt. Rev. Dr. Prasanna Kumar Samuel
- Pastor: Rev. Victor G Hebich

The William Arthur Memorial Church is located on the Bangalore-Honavar Road at Gubbi Town, about 80 km from Bangalore. The church is painted brick red and built in the Gothic style, being completed in 1904. The church is named after William Arthur, an Irish Wesleyan missionary and Canarese scholar, who served in Gubbi. The present structure replacing the old Gobbee Chapel, built by Thomas Hodson. The church is managed by the Church of South India and comes under the Karnataka Central Diocese

== Wesleyan Canarese Mission, Gubbi ==
Gubbi was the only town other than Bangalore where an Wesleyan Canarese Mission station was established. In 1837, the first missionaries to the Gubbi Station were Thomas Hodson and John Jenkins. The history of the early days of the Gubbi Mission is narrated by William Arthur in his book A Mission to the Mysore, With Scenes and Facts Illustrative of India, Its People, and Its Religion published in 1847, and Thomas Hodson in his book Old Daniel, Or, Memoir of a Converted Hindoo: With Observations On Mission Work in the Goobbe Circuit and Description of Village Life in India, published in 1877.

=== First sermon at Gubbi, 1836 ===
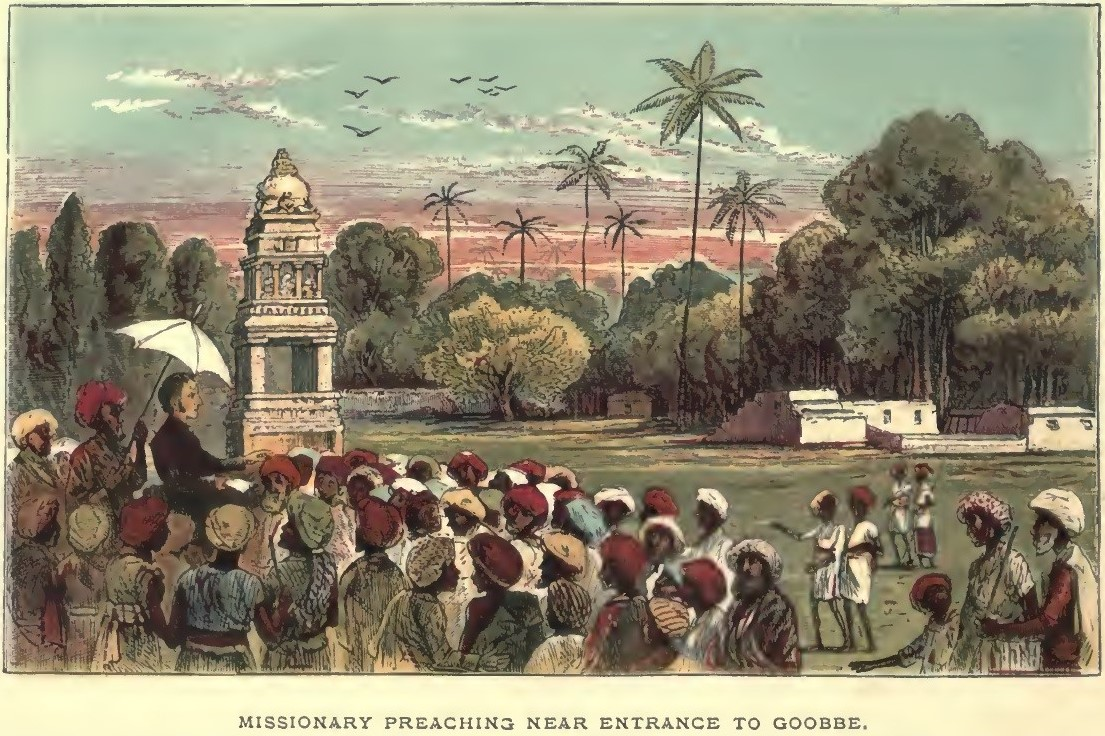
Missionary preaching near entrance to Goobbe, 1836 (Hodson, 1877, p. 33)

Thomas Hodson preached his first sermon at Goobbe on 1 September 1836, near its gates, from an unoccupied shop which opened to the street. Arriving as a guest of Captain Dobbs, after spending a few days at Toomcoor, Hodson rode the 20 miles to Gubbi. He was received about a mile from the gates of Gubbi by some of its prominent citizens, who accompanied Hodson till the town. A town crier announced on the streets of the town, that a man of distinction has arrived in the town. After examining the town for the suitability of starting a mission station, Hodson proceeded to the gates of the town. Here the first sermon was delivered with the help of a native Christian who had been a school master in Toomcoor. One of the people listening to the first sermon was Chickka, the village washerman, who was first convert to Christianity at Gubbi, taking up the Christian name of Daniel on conversion. A short while after the first sermon, Thomas Hodson sent Franklin, an assistant missionary to make arrangements for setting up a mission station at Goobbe (p. 41-46).

=== Goobbe Mission Station, 1837 ===
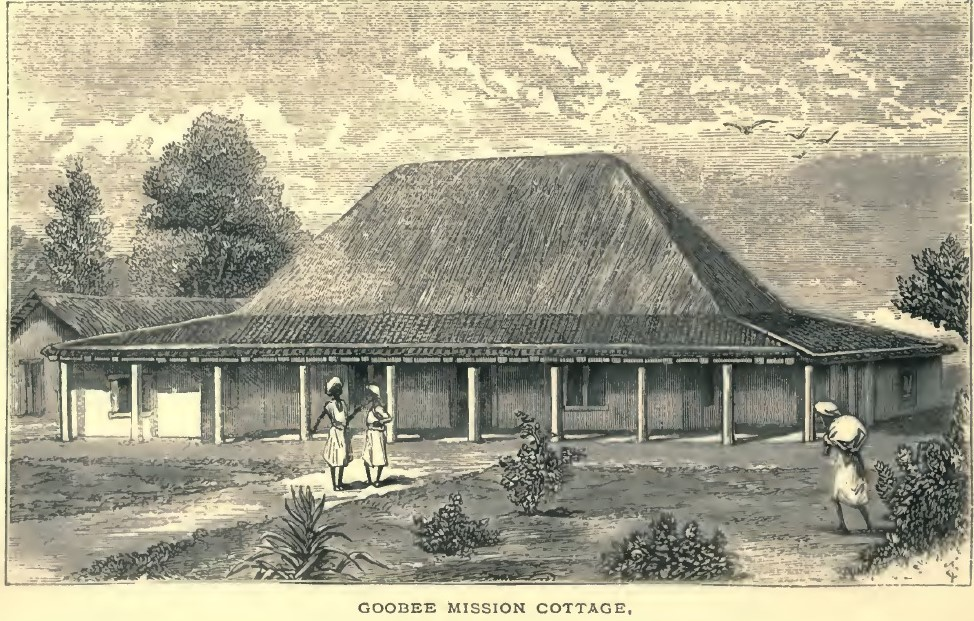
Goobee Mission Cottage, 1837 (Hodson, 1877, p. 46)

The mission station at Goobbe was started in April 1837, with Thomas Hodson and his wife moving to Goobbe. Initially they lived in tents, and after a while built mud cottages with thatched roof (see figure). The mud walls of the house were 6 ft high, and the house had a few small rooms. The house was cool during the hot seasons, but leaked during the rains. Further, Hodson provides a description of the village life at Goobbe. Low flat lands well irrigated from a tank grew paddy. There were also large clumps of trees and large tracts of un-cultivated land, which was used as common pasture lands for sheep and cows. The shepherd boys usually had a hand made flute and played a sweet tone. Deer were common and were seen fleeting outside the mission house.

Hodson and his assistant would travel to the surrounding villages and preach Christianity. As literacy was very low, use of tracts was not possible. Even though most natives listened attentively to the ideas of the new religion, they were unwilling to forsake their ancestral gods. Women of the village brought their sick children to the mission house, and Mrs. Hodson would provide them with basic medicines.

Hodson records a visit to Singonahully, which was Daniel's village, and preached a sermon there. He records, his sermon was of no interest as most were interested in Mrs Hodson and her dress. (p. 47-50).

According to William Arthur, after Thomas Hodson acquired land and started constructing a mud house to live. As the construction was going on, Captain Dobbs lent him a tent to live in. Once finished the mud house was cool in summer, but leaked heavily during the rains. Sometimes, Hodson had to spend the whole night under an umbrella, when it rained. There were also white ants, which were notorious for destroying everything in their path. After the house was completed, Mr. Jenkins joined the Gubbi Mission, and Thomas Hodson moved to Mysore (p. 188).

=== Goobbe Mission House, 1838 ===
On 24 May 1838, Mrs. Hodson laid the foundation for the Goobbe Mission House. The building was completed on 17 August 1839, at a cost of £180. A few days after its completion, another missionary John Jenkins along with his wife and child were assigned to the station and came to live at Goobbe. Half of the new house, consisting of a large room and two small rooms were given up for this additional missionary. By this time many villagers started visiting the mission house.(p. 53).

=== Baptism of Daniel, 1843 ===
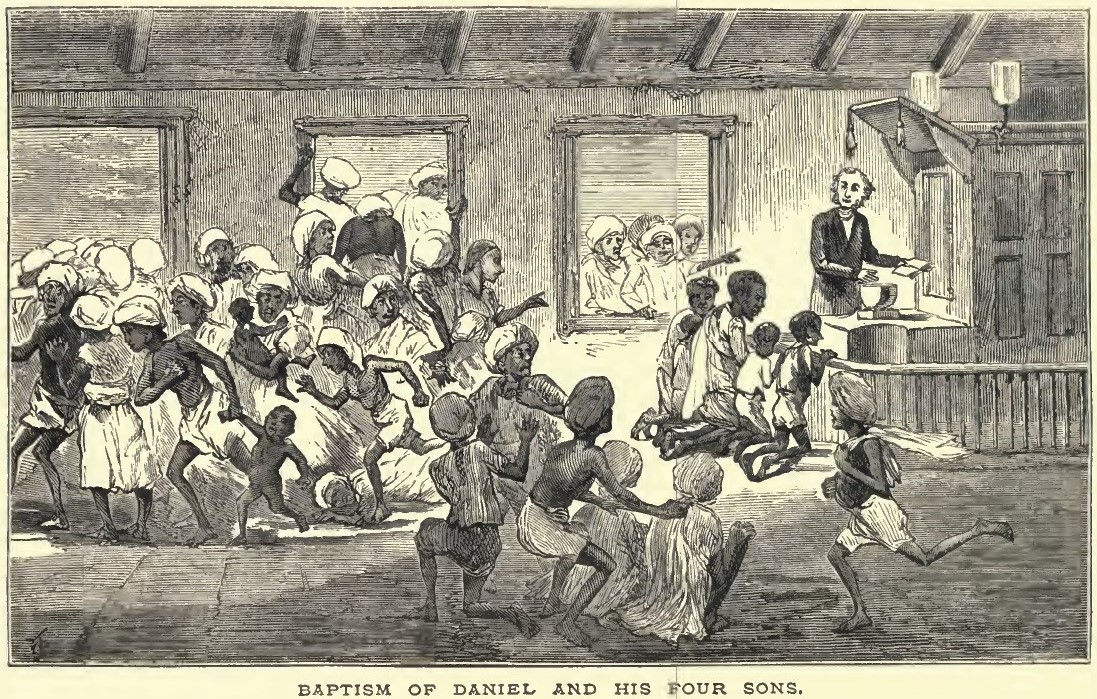
Baptism of Daniel and his Four Sons, 1843 (Hodson, 1877, p. 63)

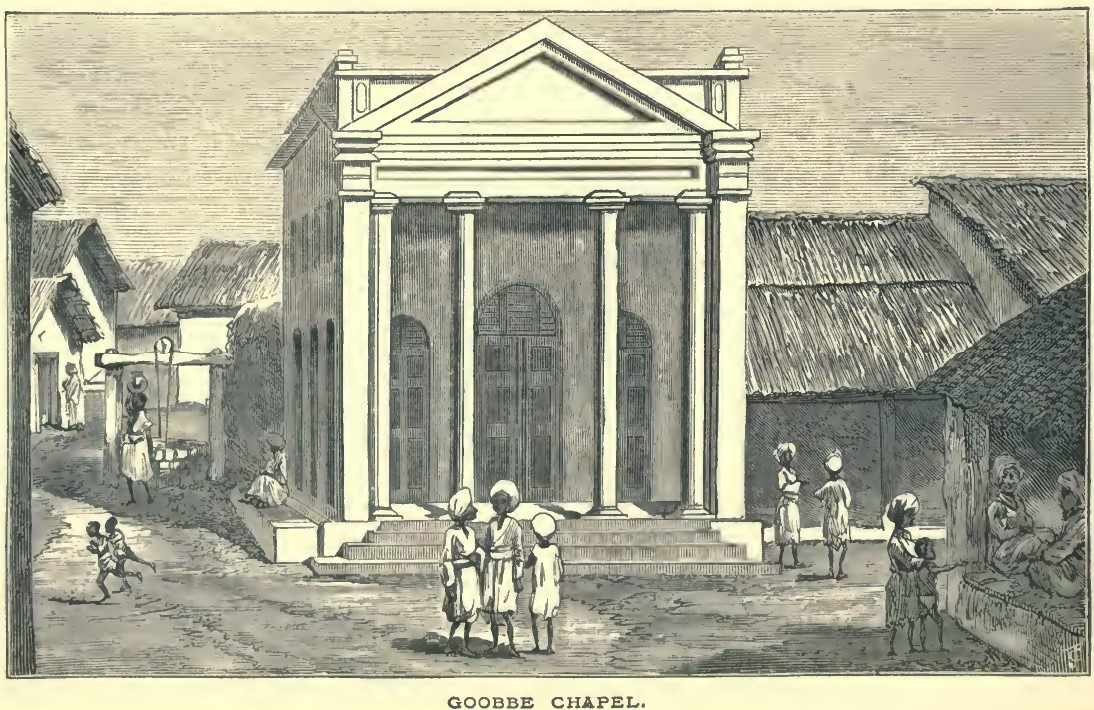
Gobbee Chapel, 1860 (Hodson, 1877, p. 78)

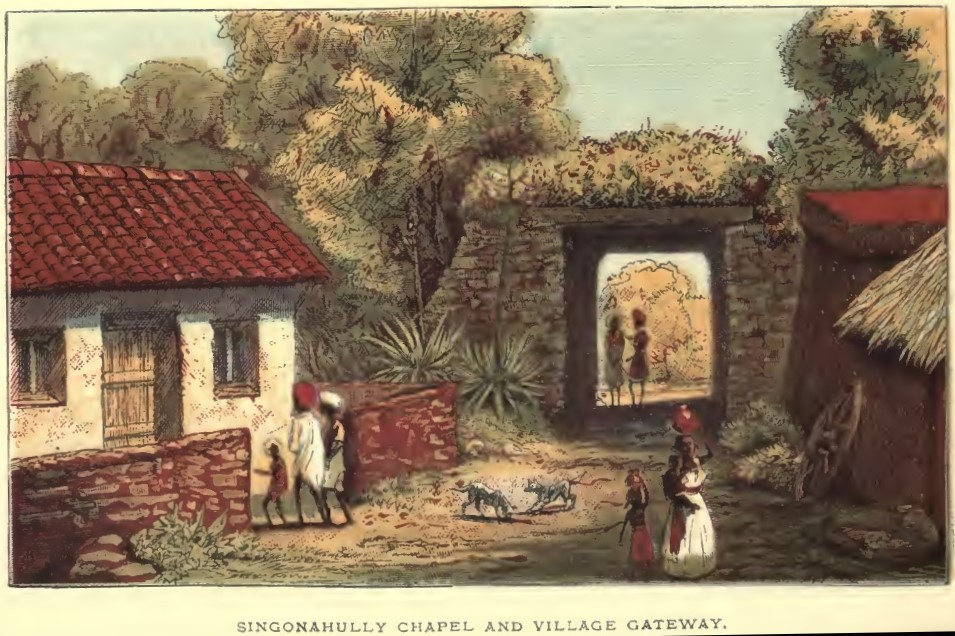
Singonahully Chapel and village gateway, 1864 (Hodson, 1877, p. 82)

The Goobbe Mission House served as a day school during weekdays for the village children. Many adults also attended school and learnt to read and write. The mission had also started a school at Singonahully, which was Chicka the washerman's village. In early 1843, Chicka told Mr. Hardy the missionary that he desired to be baptised. Mr. Hardey, along with the native catechist Nallamuttoo questioned him on his intentions and wanted him to be sure. Chicka was also known to the other missionaries who served in Goobbe - Hardey, Sanderson and Male, and Male who was at that time stationed in Mysore was asked to perform the baptism. The baptism of Chicka took place on 13 August 1843. The ceremony was a spectacle for the villagers. When Mr. Male touched the water for baptism, the other natives fearing that water will be sprinkled on them and they would also become Christians ran for cover and exited the chapel from the doors and the windows. They continued to watch the ceremony from outside. Chicka was baptised taking up the name of Daniel, and his four sons were also baptised taking up the names of John, Peter, Timothy and Samuel. His wife was baptised after six months by Mr. Male as he was passing through Goobbe and given the name of Sarah. After their conversion, Daniel's family continued to live at the village of Singonahully. (p. 59-65).

=== Goobbe Mission abandoned, 1851 ===
In 1851, the Wesleyan Missionary Society was in large debt and was forced to close several mission stations. One of the stations to be abandoned was the Goobbe Mission. The missionaries were recalled, and the Goobbe Mission House, the Goobbe Chapel, the school rooms and other buildings were sold. The chapel was purchased by the government of Mysore and converted into a travellers resting house. A few native Christians reverted to Hinduism. (p. 73-75).

=== Goobbe Chapel, 1860 ===
After a few years of abandoning the Goobbe Mission, the finances of the Wesleyan Missionary Society improved, and recruitment was in for new missionaries in the Mysore State. Thomas Hodson returned to India on 1 January 1854, and after spending several months in Madras, arrived at Bangalore. Hodson visited Goobbe on 16 April 1855, and on meeting Daniel, resolved to restart the Goobbe Mission. The government of Mysore agreed to resell the chapel to the Wesleyan Missionary Society, and the house building was repaired under the supervision of Mr. Sullivan. A new bigger chapel was raised in Goobbe and consecrated on 12 June 1860. The opening ceremony was preached by Thomas Hodson. (p. 76-79). An original sketch by Thomas Hodson, detailing the Goobbe Chapel, with the opening date of 12 June 1860 scribbled, is in the possession of the Museum of Sydney, The Rocks.

=== Singonahully Village Chapel, 1864 ===
Till 1864, there was one building in Singonahully Village which served both as chapel and school room. Daniel (Chicka) wanted a new school room and proposed the idea to the missionaries. A modification was made such that the present building serve a school and a new chapel be raised. Daniel contributed a modest sum of £4 towards the cost, and the rest was raised by subscriptions, and a new chapel was raised at Singonahully Village. (p. 83).

== Thomas Hodson in Gubbi ==
In 1832, Thomas Hodson was appointed to Bangalore, along with Peter Percival. Wesleyan missionaries were supposed to take up the dual task of educating and preaching to the locals. Around this time, Hodson decided to start a mission at Gubbi, which a native town in the Mysore Kingdom. The reason for Hodson choosing Gubbi to set up the mission was because in Bangalore, he found that his time and efforts were taken away in preaching to the British and European officers, and he could not concentrate on the local population. However, the Gubbi mission was temporarily abandoned and Hodson returned to Bangalore, and had to take up the role of supervisor of the Wesleyan Tamil Mission.

For some time, Hodson was involved in managing the Tamil works at Bangalore. After some time he moved back to Goobie, living out in a tent. Rev. Thomas Cryer took over from Hodson as the supervisor of the Wesleyan Tamil Mission. At this time William Arthur (an Irishman, after whom the William Arthur Church at Goobie is named after) and Peter Batchelor, laymen who came to Madras to run the Church Ministry Service (CMS) Press, joined the Wesleyan Mission, and were transferred to the Wesleyan Tamil Mission at Bangalore Cantonment. Arthur them moved to Goobie as the Wesleyan missionary. Thomas Hodson recorded the experiences of the Gubbi Mission in his book Old Daniel, Or, Memoir of a Converted Hindoo: With Observations On Mission Work in the Goobbe Circuit and Description of Village Life in India, which provides an excellent account of village life in the 19th-century Mysore State.

== William Arthur ==
William Arthur (1819–1901) was a Wesleyan minister, who was born on 3 February 1819 at Glendun, County Antrim, Ireland. William was the son of James Arthur, whose traced his ancestry to the Limerick and Clare counties. His mother was Margaret Kennedy of Scottish and Ulster descent. A short time after he was born, his family removed to Westport, County Mayo. William was raised as an Episcopalian, and went to become a Wesleyan Methodist. William started preaching at the age of 16. Travelling to England, he joined the Hoxton Academy which trained Wesleyan missionaries. On 15 April 1839, William sailed for India, to work as a missionary of the Wesleyan Missionary Society. In India he preached at Gubbi, about 80 miles north-west of Bangalore. He returned to England in 1841 as a result of failing health. In 1842 he was stationed at Wesley's chapel, City Road, London. Then from 1846 till 1848 he ministered at France, first at Boulogne and then in Paris. In 1849 and 1850 his work was at Hinde Street and Great Queen Street, London. On 18 June 1850, William married Elizabeth Ellis Ogle of Leeds, and had six daughters. From 1851 to 1868 he served as one of the secretaries of the Wesleyan Missionary Society, and he was an honorary secretary between 1888 and 1891. From 1868 to 1871 he was worked as the principal of the Methodist College, Belfast. William was elected president of the Wesleyan Conference in 1866. In 1888 he settled at Cannes, France, where he occasionally preached in the Presbyterian church. William died at Cannes on 9 March 1901.

== William Arthur's description of Goobbee ==
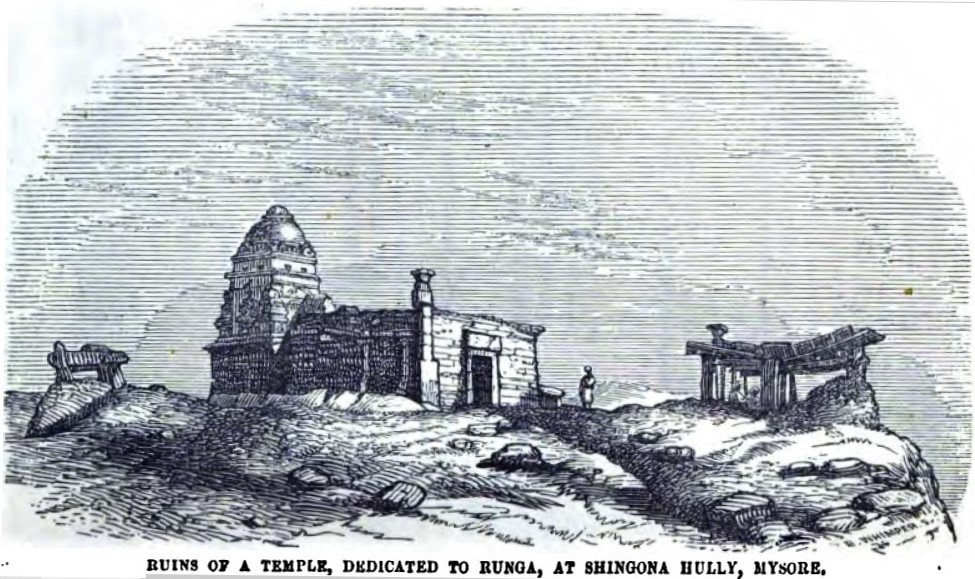
Ruins of a temple, dedicated to Runga, at Shingona Hully, Mysore (p. 85, 1856)

Goobbee town was located about 60 miles north-west of Bangalore and had a population of between 6000 and 7000 people. The town people traded items such as coffee, grains, betel-nut, etc., which were purchased from Nuggur (Bednore) and sold in the markets of Bangalore and Wallajanuggur (Vellore). The residents were prosperous from this trade and town had its weekly market. At that time, the exchange rate for the British Indian rupee was 2 British shillings (BINR 10 = British £1). Labour was cheap, costing as little as BINR 3 (6 British shillings) a month. The cost of grains and spices and rent was minimal. Fuel used for cooking was cow dung. Generally one meal was cooked hot and eaten, and the other meal eaten cold. A man with BINR 10 was comfortable, one with BINR 20 respectable, one with BINR 50 was prosperous and one with BINR 100 was wealthy. However the cost of living and salaries were much higher in British Indian cities.

Goobbee like other Indian cities was surrounded by a mud wall, used to repel wild beasts and thugs. The term town (oor) applied only to places with both a market and a wall, village (hully) was one with a wall but not a market, hamlet (palya) consisted of houses with neither market or wall, and city (patna) was the seat of power. Villages had only one gate, towns two gates at opposite ends. The town of Goobbee had two main streets, intersected with minor streets. At one end of the mud fort, there lived the rich merchants. On the other side of the village lived the lower caste people, which was avoided by the higher caste. There was a clear demarcation between the higher castes and the lower castes, with the higher caste people refusing to cross into what they considered as a polluted land (p. 189-191).

== Wesleyan Methodist missionaries, Goobbe ==
According to Thomas Hodson's book, the following Wesleyan missionaries served at Goobbe in the 19th century:

- Thomas Hodson and his wife
- William Arthur
- Edward Hardey (buried in Shivanasamudram)
- Matthew Trevan Male
- Jenkins
- Daniel Sanderson and his wife Sarah
- Walker
- Sullivan
- Hocken
- Haigh

== Matthew Trevan Male ==
In 1840, Matthew Trevan Male and his wife Catherine Male (parents of wartime author Arthur Hodson Male) joined William Arthur at Gubbi, where two of his children suffered from croup and died as medical aid was two days away. The two graves were at the Gubbi Mission House.

== Sketches ==
A series of sketches associated with Gubbi Chapel, currently in the possession of the Museum of Sydney could not be displayed here, due to licensing issues. It can be seen at these links below:

- Sketch 1: Front of temporary Mission House, Goobie, Mysore, India / artist unknown (1837)
- Sketch 2: Goobie Chapel, Mysore, India, opened 12 June 1860 / artist unknown (1860)

A photo of the William Arthur Memorial Church, from the Fred Goodwill collection, dated early 20th century

- Image 1: William Arthur Memorial Church, Gubbi
