= Mohan Manoraj =

Indian Protestant bishop

- Bishop in Karnataka Southern Diocese of Church of South India
- Diocese: Karnataka Southern Diocese
- See: Church of South India
- In office: 2014-2022
- Predecessor: John Sadananda
- Successor: Hemachandra Kumar
- Previous posts: Pastor, Church of South India (1986–2014), Teacher, Karnataka Theological College, Mangalore(1995-1996),

Orders
- Ordination: 27 July 1986 as Deacon and 25 June 1989 as Presbyter by D. P. Shettian
- Consecration: 15 December 2014 by G. Dyvasirvadam, Moderator and Thomas K Oommen, Deputy Moderator, Church of South India Synod

Personal details
- Born: 16 November 1954 Karnataka

Mohan Manoraj (born 16 November 1954) is the present Bishop in Karnataka Southern Diocese of the Church of South India, the sixth in succession, and occupies the Cathedra at the CSI-Shanthi Cathedral in Mangalore who was consecrated on 14 December 2015.

== Studies ==
Manoraj pursued two degrees in sociology, Bachelor of Arts and a Master of Arts from the University of Mysore. As he was inclined to become a priest, he discerned his avocation and underwent ministerial formation at the Karnataka Theological College, Mangalore, a Seminary affiliated to the nation's first University {a University under Section 2 (f) of the University Grants Commission Act, 1956}) with degree-granting authority validated by a Danish Charter and ratified by the Government of West Bengal under the Principalship of C. L. Furtado.

== Ministry ==
Soon after Manoraj's ordination by D. P. Shettian, he was assigned ministerial roles in the Karnataka Southern Diocese of the Church of South India. Manoraj later upgraded his academics by pursuing a postgraduate course at the Tamil Nadu Theological Seminary, Madurai specialising in Social Analysis under the notable Activist-Scholar Gabriele Dietrich. After returning from Madurai, Manoraj taught for a year at the Karnataka Theological College, Mangalore between 1995–1996 and has been a visiting Teacher since then as he went back for pastoral ministry. Before becoming a bishop, Manoraj was a priest at the CSI-Sawday Memorial Church in Mysore.

== Bishopric ==
The Karnataka Southern Diocese was led by John Sadananda who resigned in 2013 on attaining superannuation resulting in sede vacante which the Church of South India Synod deliberated and appointed Manoraj at the CSI-Shanthi Cathedral, Mangalore on 15 December 2014 as the sixth bishop. Manoraj was principally consecrated by G. Dyvasirvadam the moderator as well as by Thomas K Oommen the deputy moderator in the presence of other clergy of the Church of South India.

Religious titles
Preceded by John Sadananda; 2009-2013	Bishop - in - Karnataka Central Diocese; Church of South India; 2014-	Succeeded by Hemachandra Kumar
