= Ravikumar Niranjan =

- Bishop of Northern Karnataka
- Church: Church of South India
- Diocese: Northern Karnataka
- In office: 2012-
- Predecessor: -
- Previous post: Treasurer Northern Karnataka Diocese

Orders
- Consecration: 2012

Ravikumar Niranjan is the fifth Bishop of Northern Karnataka of the Church of South India: he has been in office since 2012.

Niranjan has also been an ecumenical liaison officer in Germany and Treasurer of Northern Karnataka Diocese.

== Notes ==
Religious titles
Preceded by Prabhakara Rao	Bishop of Northern Karnataka	Succeeded by Incumbent
