= S. R. Furtado =

Bishop Sebastian Rathnakar Furtado B.D. (Serampore)
- Bishop in Karnataka Southern Diocese of Church of South India
- Church: Church of South India
- Diocese: Karnataka Southern Diocese
- In office: 1970-1978
- Predecessor: Norman C. Sargant (erstwhile Diocese of Mysore)
- Successor: D. P. Shettian
- Previous posts: Spiritual Formator; Basel Evangelical Mission Theological Seminary, Mangalore (1959-65); Karnataka Theological College, Mangalore (1965-1971)

Orders
- Ordination: 1952 by United Basel Mission Church of South Kanara and Coorg
- Consecration: 2 May 1971 by P. Solomon, Moderator and J. E. L. Newbigin, Deputy Moderator, Church of South India Synod
- Rank: Bishop

Personal details
- Born: Sebastian Ratnakar Furtado; April 12, 1912 South Canara, Madras Presidency
- Died: Mangalore, Karnataka
- Denomination: Christianity
- Parents: Smt. Mary Jane (Mother); Sri Lazar Andrea Furtado (Father)
- Profession: Priesthood
- Education: Senate of Serampore College (Bachelor of Divinity)

S. R. Furtado (April 25, 1912 – November 4, 1995) was the first Bishop - in - Karnataka Southern Diocese of Church of South India headquartered in Mangalore.

== Studies ==
Furtado's family hailed from a Roman Catholic family which joined the Basel Evangelical Mission and studied at Serampore College, Serampore, where his 1950 graduate thesis for his Bachelor of Divinity was Bhuta (Demon) Worship in South Canara and Its Effect on the Life and Religion of the People.

== Ecclesiastical ministry ==
From 1959 onwards, Furtado taught at the Basel Evangelical Mission Theological Seminary at Mangalore until 1965 and then continued to teach at the new entity, the Karnataka Theological College, Mangalore, which was formed with the coming together of the BEMTS where Furtado was already teaching, and the Union Kanarese Seminary, Tumkur. Furtado resigned from the College in 1970 on account his elevation to the newly formed Bishopric, the Karnataka Southern Diocese.

== Bishopric ==
In the 1960s, the Basel Evangelical Mission to which Furtado belonged got unionized into the Church of South India and in the ensuing ecclesiastical talks, Furtado, who was already a Theologian was chosen and principally consecrated as Bishop of Karnataka Southern Diocese on 2 May 1971 by Church of South India Synod Moderator P. Solomon in the presence of the co-consecrator, Deputy Moderator J. E. L. Newbigin. Although Furtado retired in 1978, he continued as Moderator's Commissary until 1983. K. M. George wrote about Furtado as "a man of great discipline, dedication, deep conviction and administrative ability and concern for the unity and mission of the Church".

== Writings ==
1985, The United Basel Mission Church Administration Structure

Religious titles
Preceded by Norman C. Sargant erstwhile Diocese of Mysore; 1951-1971	Bishop of Karnataka Southern Diocese; Mangalore; Church of South India; 1970-1978	Succeeded by D. P. Shettian; 1989-1997
