= Abbanakuppe =

Abbanakuppe may refer to:

- Abbanakuppe, Bangalore Rural, a village in Bangalore Rural district, Karnataka, India
- Abbanakuppe, Tumkur, a village in Tumkur district, Karnataka, India
