= Adagondanahalli =

Adgondanahalli
- village
- Location in Karnataka, India Adgondanahalli (India)
- Coordinates: 13.0165597°N 77.6221091°E
- Country: India
- State: Karnataka
- District: Tumkur
- Talukas: Gubbi

Government
  - Body: Village Panchayat

Languages
  - Official: Kannada
- Time zone: UTC+5:30 (IST)
- Nearest city: Tumkur
- Civic agency: Village Panchayat

Adagondanahalli is a village in the southern state of Karnataka, India. It is located in the Gubbi taluk of Tumkur district in Karnataka.

== Population ==
The village has a population of 532 (259 males and 273 females) as per Population Census 2011.

== See also ==
- Tumkur
- Districts of Karnataka
