= Kenneth Gill =

Kenneth, Kenny or Ken Gill is the name of:

- Ken Gill (1927–2009), British trade unionist
- Ken Gill (bishop) (1932–2013), Anglican Bishop of Karnataka Central and Assistant Bishop of Newcastle
- Ken Gill (rugby league), English professional rugby league footballer
