= Mudigere, Tumkur =

Mudigere
- Village
- Location in Karnataka, India
- Coordinates: 13.34°N 77.1°E
- Country: India
- State: Karnataka
- District: Tumakuru

Population (2001)
  - Total: 800

Languages
  - Official: Kannada
- Time zone: UTC+5:30 (IST)
- PIN: 572216
- Telephone code: 08131
- Vehicle registration: KA-06

Mudigere is a village in Gubbi taluk in the Tumkur district in the Indian state of Karnataka.

== Geography ==
Mudigere is located at 13.31°N 76.94°E. It has an average elevation of 767 metres (2516 feet).

== Demographics ==
As of 2001 India census, Mudigere had a population of 800. Males constitute 56% of the population and females 44% and has an average literacy rate of 8%.

== Industry ==
This region is famous for growing Areca nuts and transporting them throughout the state. The areca nut is not a true nut but rather a drupe. It is commercially available in dried, cured and fresh forms. While fresh, the husk is green and the nut inside is so soft that it can easily be cut with an average knife.

This region has fertile soil which is best suited for growing coconut trees and Areca nuts. Farmers also cultivate wheat crop and Eleusine coracana, commonly known as Finger millet (ragi in Kannada). Wheat and Finger millet are annual plants widely grown as a cereal.

== Temples ==
Mudigere has the temple of Sri Ranganatha Swami and Basavanna temple.

== See also ==
- Tumkur
- Tumkur District
- Taluks of Karnataka
- Gubbi Taluk
