= Diocese of Southern Karnataka of the Church of South India =

Diocese of the Church of South India in Karnataka, India

Diocese of Karnataka Southern
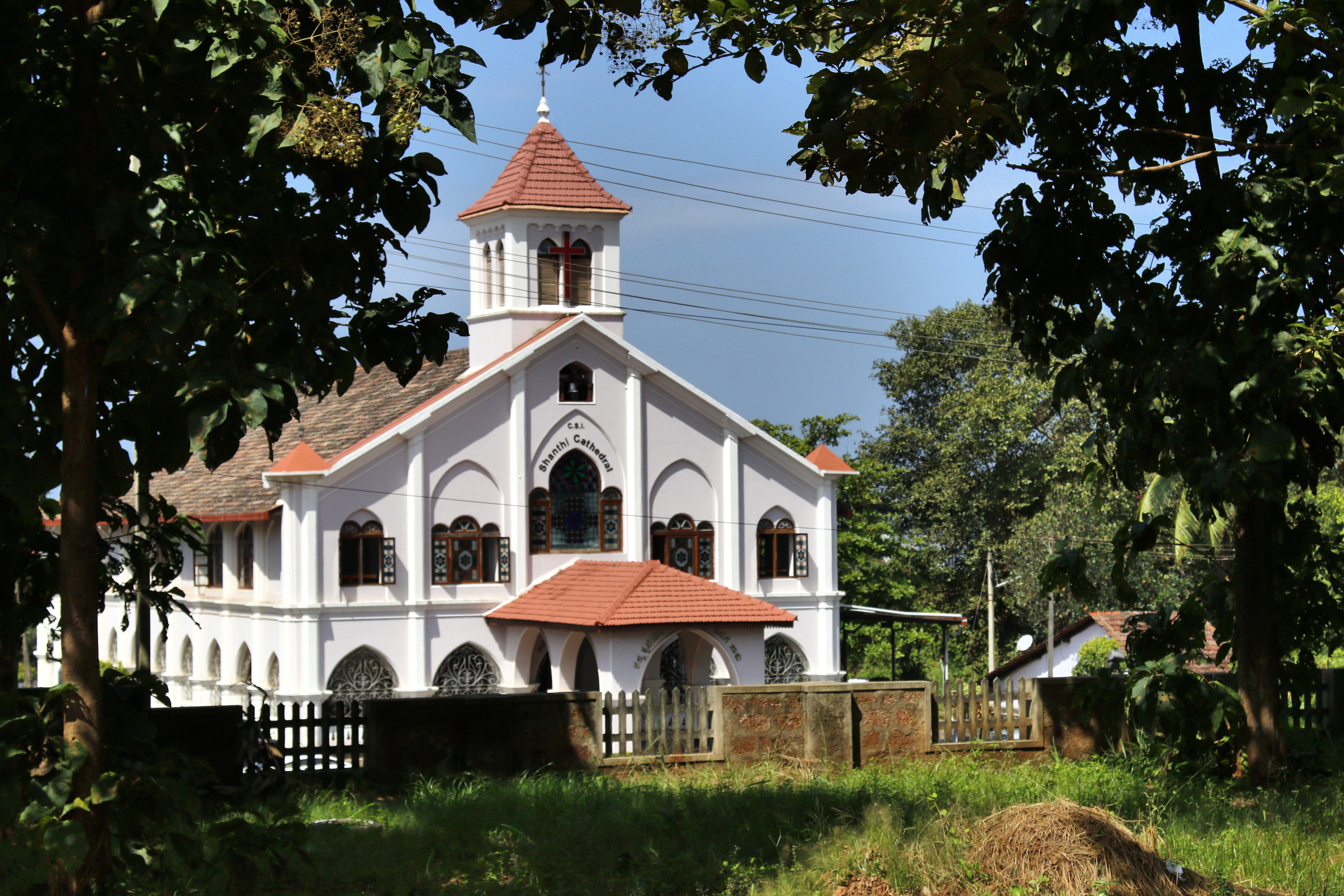
- Shanthi Cathedral, Balmatta, Mangalore

Location
- Country: India
- Ecclesiastical province: Church of South India

Statistics
- Congregations: 148

Information
- Cathedral: Shanthi Cathedral, Mangaluru

Current leadership
- Bishop: Rt Rev Hemachandra Kumar

Website
- Karnataka Southern Diocese

Karnataka Southern Diocese is one of the twenty-two dioceses of the Church of South India covering the southern part of Karnataka. The other Church of South India dioceses in Karnataka are Karnataka Northern Diocese and Central Karnataka Diocese. The Church of South India is a United Protestant denomination.

== History ==
Karnataka Southern Diocese of Church of South India was formed on 1 May 1970 by the bifurcation of then Mysore diocese.

== About ==
The diocese covers 10 districts and consists of 148 churches. The areas which comes under Karnataka southern diocese are Dakshina Kannada, Udupi, Kodagu, Chikmagalur, Hassan, Mandya, Mysore, Chamarajanagar, Kasaragod and Talavady Firkha (Tamil Nadu).

== Bishops ==
Erstwhile Mysore Diocese

- Premaka Gurushantha (1947-1951)
- Norman C. Sargant (1951-1971)

Karnataka Southern Diocese

- 1970-1978, S. R. Furtado,
- 1989-1997, D. P. Shettian
- 1997-2004, C. L. Furtado,
- 2004-2009, Devaraj Bangera,
- 2009-2013, John S. Sadananda,
- 2013-2021, Mohan Manoraj
- 2022- Present, Hemachandra Kumar

== Notable churches ==
=== Shanthi Cathedral, Balmatta, Mangalore ===
On 30 October 1834, Rev J C Lehner, Rev C L Grainer and Rev Samuel Hebich established the first station of the Basel Mission in a rented house obtained from a Parsi family in Mission Street which was then known as Neereshwalya. The Collector of Mangalore at that time, H M Blair, bought a plot at what was then known as ‘Belmount’ and handed it over to the Basel Mission free of cost. On 11 December 1862, the new church building was consecrated in Balmatta and named the Shanthi Church. By virtue of its strategic location in the Southern Diocese, the Shanthi Church was elevated to the status of Cathedral in the year 1970.

=== C.S.I Sawday Memorial Church, Mandya ===
The church is dedicated in memory of George William Sawday, a missionary born in England who arrived in Mysore in 1880 and did community service for 64 years till his death in 1944. The Sadway Memorial Church is situated in Mandya.

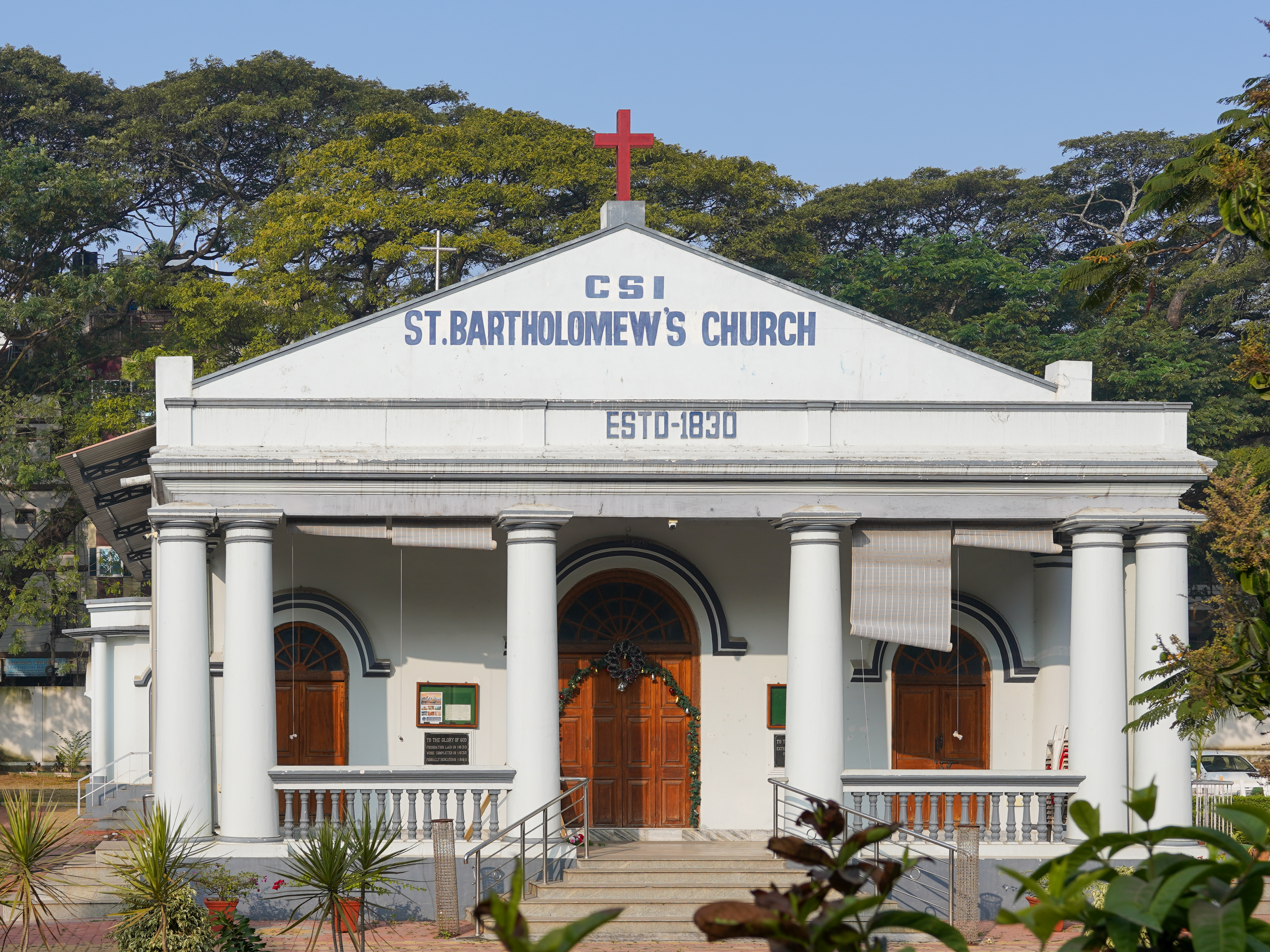
St.Bartholomew's Church, Mysore

=== St. Bartholomew's Church, Mysore ===
The site for the St. Bartholomew's Church was a gift from the Maharaja of Mysore, Krishnaraja Wodeyar III (1799-1868), and it was consecrated in 1830. The church was constructed in 1832 with contributions from military officers and civilians. In 1847, the church was affiliated to the Anglican denomination and handed over to the Madras Government in 1852.

=== St. Paul’s Church, Mangalore ===
St. Paul’s Church is located at the NW corner of the Central Maidan (now renamed Nehru Maidan), in Mangalore, India. St. Paul's is the very first Protestant church to be raised in the South Kanara region, and the first vertical building to be constructed at the Central Maidan. St. Paul's was originally a garrison church, raised by the British India army of the Madras Government, built using prison labour. St. Paul's is an imposing structure amidst the chaos of the fish market, service bus stand, and the State Bank of India.

== Institutions ==
- CSI Holdsworth Memorial Hospital (Mission Hospital), Mandi Mohalla, Mysore

The Hospital is founded by the Wesleyan Missionaries from UK in 1906. Currently it is a 300 bed multi specialty hospital.

=== Educational Institutions under the Diocese ===
- Primary Schools -43
- Nursing Schools-30
- High Schools-6
- Junior Colleges-3
- Vocational Institutions-10
- Technical Institutions-1

== See also ==
- Church of South India
- Karnataka Northern Diocese
- Central Karnataka Diocese
