= Heggere Halt railway station =

Railway station in Karnataka, India

Heggere Halt

General information
- Location: Heggere, Tumakuru district, Karnatak; India
- Coordinates: 13°20′29″N 77°02′54″E
- Elevation: 804 metres (2,638 ft)
- System: Indian Railways station
- Owner: Indian Railways
- Operator: South Western Railway
- Line: Bangalore–Arsikere–Hubli line
- Platforms: 2
- Tracks: Double Electric-Line

Construction
- Structure type: Standard (on ground)

Other information
- Status: Functioning
- Station code: HEI
- Zone(s): South Western Railway
- Division(s): Bangalore

Services
Preceding station	Indian Railways	Following station
Tumkur towards ?	South Western Railway zone Bangalore–Arsikere–Hubli line	Mallasandra towards ?
Location
- Interactive map

Heggere Halt railway station is a halt railway station in located on Bangalore–Arsikere–Hubli railway line operated by the South Western Railway zone under Bangalore railway division. It is situated at Heggere in Tumakuru district in the Indian state of Karnatak.
