= S. Vasantha Kumar =

- Bishop in Karnataka
- Church: Church of South India
- Diocese: Karnataka
- In office: 1976–1996
- Predecessor: -

Orders
- Consecration: 1996

S. Vasantha Kumar was the third Bishop of Karnataka of the Church of South India.

Religious titles
Preceded by C. D. Jathanna	Bishop in Karnataka; Church of South India; 1996–2012	Succeeded by Prasana Kumar Samuel
