= C. D. Jathanna =

Bishop C. D. Jathanna, CSI D.D. (Honoris causa) (Serampore) (1993)
- Bishop in Karnataka Central Diocese of Church of South India
- Church: Church of South India
- Diocese: Karnataka Central
- In office: 1983–1993
- Predecessor: Kenneth E. Gill, CSI
- Successor: S. Vasantha Kumar, CSI
- Other posts: Principal, Karnataka Theological College, Mangalore (Karnataka)(1967–1983)
- Previous posts: Councillor, Mangalore City Corporation, Senat Member, University of Mangalore, President, Senate of Serampore College (University), Vice-President, Gandhi Peace Foundation, District and State Commissioner, Bharat Scouts and Guides, Member, Karnataka State Khadi And Village Industries Board, Member, Karnataka State Adult Literacy Advisory Committee.

Orders
- Ordination: 1960 by Basel Evangelical Mission
- Consecration: 1983 by I. Jesudasan, CSI, Moderator and Sundar Clarke, CSI, Deputy Moderator, Church of South India Synod
- Rank: Bishop

Personal details
- Born: Constantine Devaprasad Jathanna; July 6, 1928 Shirva, (Madras Presidency)
- Died: July 23, 1996 (aged 68) Mangalore (Karnataka)
- Denomination: Christian
- Parents: Smt. and Sri R. D. Jathanna
- Occupation: Priest
- Education: B.A. (Madras); B.D. (Serampore); Th.M. (UTS); Dr.Theol. (Hamburg)
- Alma mater: United Theological College, Bangalore (Karnataka); Union Theological Seminary, Charlottesville, Virginia (United States); University of Hamburg, Hamburg (Germany)

C. D. Jathanna (Constantine Devaprasad Jathanna) (6 July 1928 – 23 July 1996) was the fourth Bishop in Karnataka Central Diocese headquartered in Bangalore with the Cathedra of the Bishop placed at St. Mark's Cathedral, Bangalore.

== Studies ==
=== Graduate ===
Jathanna studied Bachelor of Arts completing it by 1951. For a year he worked as a Rationing Officer with the Government of Tamil Nadu (erstwhile Government of Madras) before proceeding for spiritual studies at the United Theological College, Bangalore during the years 1952–1955 where he studied along with E. C. John, Victor Premasagar, N. D. Ananda Rao Samuel and others.

=== Post-graduate ===
In 1958 he pursued a postgraduate degree, Master of Theology at the Union Theological Seminary in Virginia, Charlottesville, Virginia entitling his dissertation as Torah and Berith in the Pentateuch.

=== Research studies ===
In 1964 Jathanna got a scholarship of the Mission-Academy and went on study leave to the University of Hamburg, Hamburg where he studied Old Testament at the Faculty of Evangelical Theology under Klaus Koch, a direct student of Gerhard von Rad. In 1967 he was able to complete his doctoral dissertation under the supervision of Professors Hans Joachim Kraus and Marie-Louise Henry which was later published in 1969 under the title The Covenant and covenant making in Pentateuch.

== Ecclesiastical career ==
After completing studies in spirituality at the United Theological College, Bangalore in 1955, Jathanna was the secretary of the Student Christian Movement (Karnataka Unit) from 1955 through 1957.

From 1959 onwards Jathanna was assigned a pastoral role and served as an evangelist before his ordination in 1960. From 1961 onwards, Jathanna taught at the B. E. M. Theological Seminary in Mangalore (now Karnataka Theological College serving also as vice-principal of the seminary.

After completing doctoral studies in 1967, he was appointed principal of the Karnataka Theological College, Mangalore. Jathanna was a member of the Senate of Serampore College (University) and was a member of its research committee. In 1980, Jathanna visited the Andhra Christian Theological College, Hyderabad along with Klaus Koch (who was visiting professor at the United Theological College, Bangalore as part of the research committee of the Senate.

== Recognition and honour ==
John Sadananda, a colleague of Jathanna at the Karnataka Theological College, Mangalore edited a festschrift in honour of Jathanna which was entitled Vision and Reality: Essays in Honour of Constantine D. Jathanna published by the College in 1989.

In 1993, the country's first university, the Senate of Serampore College (University) under the Registrarship of D. S. Satyaranjan conferred the honorary doctorate degree by honoris causa upon Jathanna.

Religious titles
Preceded by Kenneth E. Gill; 1972 - 1980	CSI Bishop - in - Karnataka Central Diocese; Bangalore; 1983 - 1993	Succeeded by S. Vasantha Kumar; 1997 - 2012
Academic offices
Preceded by Robert Scheuermeier; 1965 - 1967	Principal, Karnataka Theological College, Mangalore; 1967 - 1983	Succeeded by C. L. Furtado; 1983 - 1997
Preceded by Post created	Teacher - in - Old Testament, Karnataka Theological College, Mangalore; 1965 - 1983	Succeeded by John Sadananda; 1974 - 2009; D. Dhanaraj; 1978 - 2015
Educational offices
Preceded by Victor Premasagar; 1977-1983	President; Senate of Serampore College (University); 1983-1986	Succeeded by Gnana Robinson; 1986-1989
Awards
Preceded by Philipose Mar Chrysostom, Dinesh Chandra Gorai, John E. Ghose 1992	Doctor of Divinity Degree (honoris causa); Senate of Serampore College (University); 1993	Succeeded by T. V. Philip, B. V. Subbamma, T. Lunkim 1994
