= Church of South India Diocese of Mysore =

Diocese of Church of South India Diocese of Mysore

Location
- Country: India
- Ecclesiastical province: Church of South India

The Diocese of Mysore was one of the Protestant dioceses of the Church of South India, the successor of the Church of England, covering the erstwhile state of Mysore, now Karnataka.

== History of the Diocese ==
The Diocese of Mysore of the Church of South India was inaugurated in 1947. In 1970, the Diocese of Mysore was trifurcated for administrative purposes into three units, as a result of this there are now three dioceses,

- Karnataka Northern Diocese,
- Karnataka Southern Diocese,
- Karnataka Central Diocese

== Bishops of the Diocese ==
Mysore Diocese

- Rt. Rev. Premaka Gurushantha (1947–1951)
- Rt. Rev. Norman C. Sargant (1951–1971)
- Rt. Rev. H. D. L. Abraham (1966–1968)
