= Paul Balmi =

Paul Balmi was the third Bishop of Northern Karnataka of the Church of South India:
