= Gubbi railway station =

Railway station in Karnataka

Gubbi

General information
- Location: M.G Road, Gubbi, Tumakuru district, Karnatak; India
- Coordinates: 13°19′17″N 76°56′21″E
- Elevation: 749 metres (2,457 ft)
- System: Indian Railways station
- Owner: Indian Railways
- Operator: South Western Railway
- Line: Bangalore–Arsikere–Hubli line
- Platforms: 2
- Tracks: Double Electric-Line

Construction
- Structure type: Standard (on ground)

Other information
- Status: Functioning
- Station code: GBB
- Zone(s): South Western Railway
- Division(s): Bangalore

Services
Preceding station	Indian Railways	Following station
Mallasandra towards ?	South Western Railway zone Bangalore–Arsikere–Hubli line	Nittur towards ?
Location
- Interactive map

Gubbi railway station is a railway station in located on Bangalore–Arsikere–Hubli railway line operated by the South Western Railway zone under Bangalore railway division. It is situated beside M.G Road at Gubbi in Tumakuru district in the Indian state of Karnatak.
