= Mallasandra railway station =

Railway station in Karnataka

Mallasandra
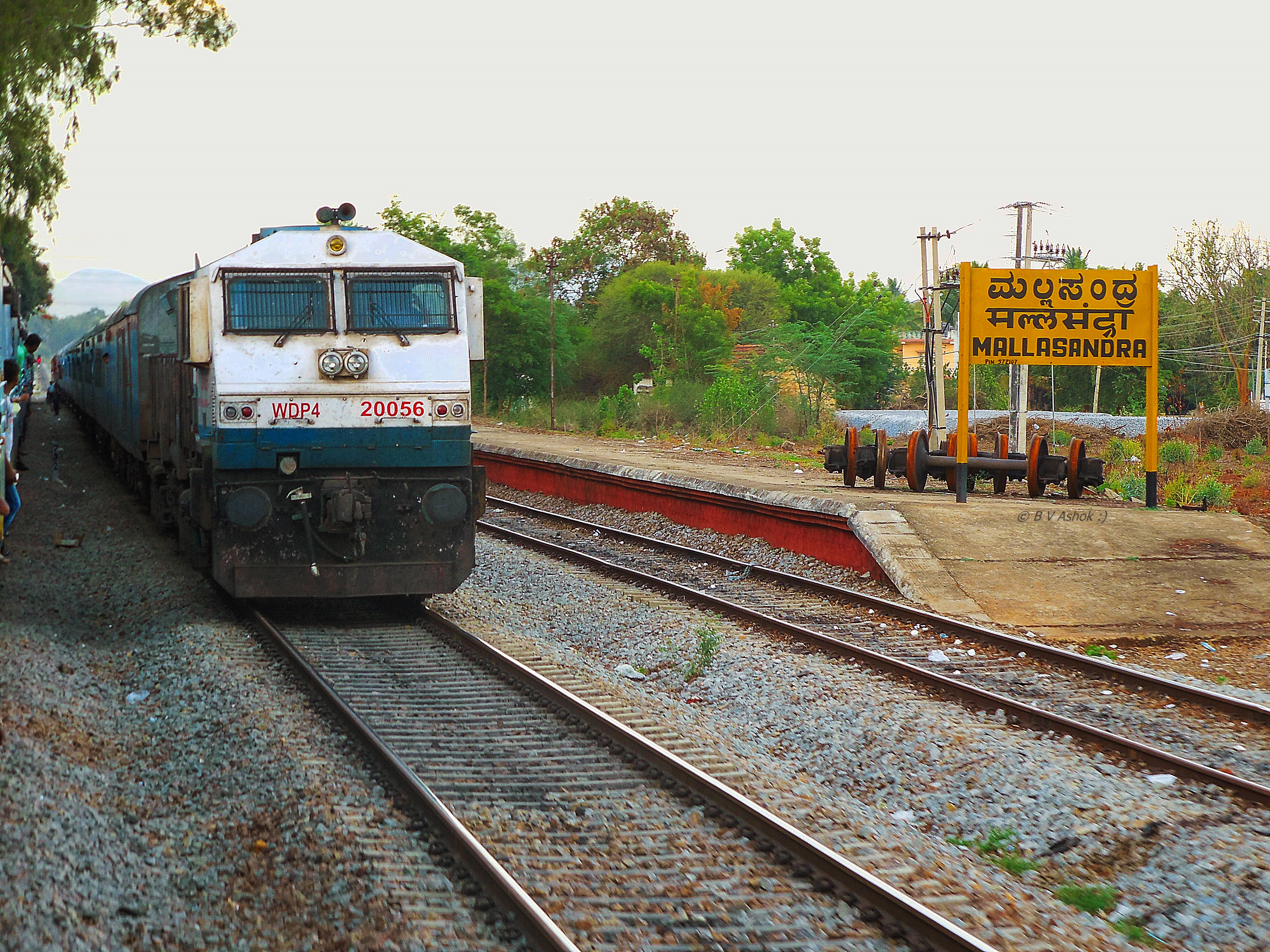
- Mallasandra railway station

General information
- Location: Mallasandra, Tumakuru district, Karnatak; India
- Coordinates: 13°20′07″N 77°00′54″E
- Elevation: 802 metres (2,631 ft)
- System: Indian Railways station
- Owner: Indian Railways
- Operator: South Western Railway
- Line: Bangalore–Arsikere–Hubli line
- Platforms: 3
- Tracks: Double Electric-Line

Construction
- Structure type: Standard (on ground)

Other information
- Status: Functioning
- Station code: MLSA
- Zone(s): South Western Railway
- Division(s): Bangalore

Services
Preceding station	Indian Railways	Following station
Heggere Halt towards ?	South Western Railway zone Bangalore–Arsikere–Hubli line	Gubbi towards ?
Location
- Interactive map

Mallasandra railway station is a railway station in located on Bangalore–Arsikere–Hubli railway line operated by the South Western Railway zone under Bangalore railway division. It is situated at Mallasandra in Tumakuru district in the Indian state of Karnatak.
