= G. S. Paramashivaiah =

Indian irrigation expert (born 1919)

Irrigation Expert and Retired Chief Engineer, PWD and Ministry of Water Resources, Government of Karnataka

Personal details
- Born: 2 January 1919 Gubbi, Tumkur District, India
- Died: 11 March 2014 (aged 95) Tumkur
- Spouse: Muktamba
- Relations: Prof. G. S. Chandrasekhar (Brother) Dr. G. S. Kumaraswamy (Brother) G.S. Shivappa
- Children: G.S.Ohileshwar G.S.Gnaneshwar G.S.Vishweshwar G.S.Deviyani G.S.Girija
- Education: University Visvesvaraya College of Engineering

G. S. Paramashivaiah (Kannada:ಜಿ.ಎಸ್. ಪರಮಶಿವಯ್ಯ)(born: 2 February 1919, at Gubbi, Tumkur District) was an irrigation expert and chief engineer from the state of Karnataka, India. He worked in various capacities in the Public Works and Irrigation departments of Karnataka state and retired as a Chief Engineer of the Irrigation Department. He also headed State technical advisory committee on Irrigation.

Paramashivaiah was behind the detailed planning, design and lobbying for the implementation of many irrigation projects including the much debated project of diversion of many west flowing rivers of Karnataka including Netravati River to irrigate the state's parched and semi arid eastern and central parts. He died on 11 March 2014 after a brief illness.
