= William Karl (bishop) =

Bishop of Northern Karnataka

William Karl (born in Nilgiris 11 July 1915 – died in Bangalore 8 March 2019) was the inaugural Bishop of Northern Karnataka of the Church of South India, serving from 1970 to 1980.

Karl was educated at St. Joseph’s College in Bangalore. He was ordained in 1945. He was the field secretary to the India Sunday School Union from 1953 to 1958. He also served in Mysore and Bangalore. In 2015 Bishop Karl celebrated his 100th birthday.
