= Ken Gill (bishop) =

The Rt Revd Kenneth E. Gill
- Assistant Bishop of Newcastle
- Diocese: Diocese of Newcastle
- In office: 1980–98
- Successor: Paul Richardson
- Other posts: Honorary assistant bishop in Diocese of Newcastle (1999–2013); Bishop of Central Karnataka (1972–1980)

Orders
- Ordination: 1958 (deacon); 1960 (presbyter)
- Consecration: 1972

Personal details
- Born: 22 May 1932
- Died: 16 February 2013 (aged 80)
- Denomination: Anglican and Methodist
- Parents: Fred & Elsie
- Spouse: Edna Hammond (m. 1957)
- Children: 3
- Profession: Missionary, writer
- Education: Hartley Victoria College, Manchester

Kenneth Edward Gill (22 May 1932 – 16 February 2013) was an Anglican bishop who was the Assistant Bishop of Newcastle in the Church of England and the Diocesan Bishop of Central Karnataka in the Church of South India.

Gill was born to Fred and Elsie Gill and attended Harrogate Grammar School in Harrogate, North Yorkshire. He married Edna Hammond in 1957 and they had three children. Gill studied at the Methodist training college Hartley Victoria College, Manchester, and was ordained a deacon in the Church of South India Diocese of Mysore in 1958 and a presbyter in 1960 – that church is a united church comprising (among others) Methodists and Anglicans. He remained in that diocese until 1972.

In 1972, Gill was consecrated bishop of the Diocese of Central Karnataka of the Church of South India, where he served until 1980, when he returned to the United Kingdom. In the Church of England, he became the first full-time ("stipendiary") Assistant Bishop of Newcastle until his 1998 retirement. He retired to Edinburgh and was licensed as an honorary assistant bishop in Newcastle diocese.

== Death ==
Gill died on 16 February 2013, aged 80.

Religious titles
Preceded by Norman C. Sargant; 1951-1970	Bishop - in - Karnataka Central Diocese; Church of South India; 1972-1980	Succeeded by C. D. Jathanna; 1983-1993

== Sources ==
- "Gill, Rt Rev. Kenneth Edward". Who's Who & Who Was Who. Vol. 1920–2014 (April 2014 online ed.). A & C Black. (Subscription or UK public library membership required.)
