= C. L. Furtado =

- CSI-Bishop Emeritus - in - Karnataka Southern
- Church: Church of South India
- Diocese: Karnataka Southern Diocese
- See: CSI-Shanthi Cathedral, Mangalore
- In office: 1997-2004
- Predecessor: D. P. Shettian
- Successor: Devaraj Bangera
- Previous posts: India Secretary, Evangelical Mission in Solidarity, Stuttgart (1992-1997), Principal, Karnataka Theological College, Mangalore (1983-1992).

Orders
- Consecration: 25 August 1997 by Vasanth P. Dandin, Moderator and William Moses, Deputy Moderator, Church of South India Synod
- Rank: Bishop

Personal details
- Born: Karnataka

C. L. Furtado (Christopher Lazarus Furtado) is CSI-Bishop Emeritus - in - Karnataka Southern of Church of South India. Furtado became the third Bishop on 25 August 1997, the date on which he was consecrated as Bishop in the diocese that is headquartered in Mangalore with the Cathedra of the Bishop placed at CSI-Shanthi Cathedral, Mangalore.

== Studies ==
=== Graduate ===
Furtado pursued a spiritual course leading to Bachelor of Divinity at the United Theological College, Bangalore during the years 1962-1964 during the Principalship of Joshua Russell Chandran after which the University awarded him a degree during the Registrarship of C. Devasahayam. Furtado's graduate thesis was entitled A Brief History of the work of the Basel Mission in Coorg from 1855 to 1914 with special reference to the methods of Evangelism.

=== Research studies ===
In 1972, Furtado went on study leave to the University of Hamburg, Hamburg where he studied Church History at the Faculty of Evangelical Theology and was able to complete his doctoral dissertation in 1977 under the supervision of Professors Hans Jochen Margull and Waack which was later published in 1978 under the title The Contribution of D. T. Niles to the Church Universal and Local.

== Ecclesiastical ministry ==
=== Teacher ===
Soon after his ministerial formation at the Protestant Regional Seminary in Bangalore, Furtado began teaching at the Karnataka Theological College, Mangalore, affiliated to the nation's first University, the Senate of Serampore College (University) along with Robert Scheuermeier, C. D. Jathanna and other Teachers till 1992 when he accepted an overseas assignment as India Liaison Secretary.

=== Administrator ===
From 1992 through 1997, Furtado was India Liaison Secretary at the Evangelical Mission in Solidarity, Stuttgart, an overseas support partner of the Church of South India. In fact, it was Robert Scheuermeier, then India Secretary who advocated for an Indian to hold the post which he was relieving. After Furtado's stint at Stuttgart, he returned to India to take up the Bishopric in the Karnataka Southern Diocese after which P. Surya Prakash, then Professor of Homiletics at the Protestant Regional Seminary in Bangalore was appointed.

=== Bishopric ===
In 1997, when D. P. Shettian vacated the Cathedra in the CSI-Shanthi Cathedral, Mangalore on attaining superannuation, the resulting sede vacante was filled by the Church of South India Synod with the appointment of Furtado who by then returned from Stuttgart. Furtado was consecrated as Bishop - in - Mangalore at the CSI-Shanthi Cathedral, Mangalore by Vasanth P. Dandin, the Moderator and William Moses, the Deputy Moderator of the Church of South India Synod.

== Writings ==
- 1964, A Brief History of the work of the Basel Mission in Coorg from 1855 to 1914 with special reference to the methods of Evangelism,
- 1978, The Contribution of D. T. Niles to the Church Universal and Local,
- 1979, The Basel Mission industry 1850-1913 - Recruiting and discipling the working class by Rudolf Fischer,
- 1979, Sources and books on Basel Mission available at the Karnataka Theological College,
- 1981, The relevance of the Theology of Augsburg Confession to the Indian context,
- 1985, Contribution of Basel Mission to the cause of Theological Education,
- 1985, Content Analysis of Theological Syllabi - History of Christianity,
- 2006, Ecumenical Christian Centre's search of a true Ecumenist
- 2008, Channappa Uttangi's contribution to the theology of religions,

Religious titles
Preceded by D. P. Shettian; 1989-1997	CSI-Bishop - in - Karnataka Southern, Mangalore; 1997-2004	Succeeded by Devaraj Bangera; 1997-2009
Other offices
Preceded by Robert Scheuermeier; 1981-1992	India Liaison Secretary, Evangelical Mission in Solidarity, Stuttgart (Germany); 1992-1997	Succeeded by Luise Plock; 1997-2000
Academic offices
Preceded by C. D. Jathanna; 1967-1983	Principal, Karnataka Theological College, Mangalore; 1983-1992	Succeeded by John S. Sadananda; 1992-2009
Honorary titles
Preceded by	Chairperson, Henry Martin Institute, Hyderabad -2010	Succeeded by P. Surya Prakash; 2010-2015
