= Prasana Kumar Samuel =

The Right Reverend Prasana Kumar Samuel
- Bishop of Karnataka Central
- Church: Church of South India
- Diocese: Karnataka Central
- Installed: 2015
- Term ended: 2023
- Successor: Rt Rev Martin Charlus Borgai
- Other post: Acting Principal of Bishop Cotton Boys School from 2018-2020, Chairman of Bishop Cotton Boys School from 2015- April 2024

Orders
- Consecration: 2015

Personal details
- Born: KGF
- Spouse: Esther
- Children: 2

Prasana Kumar Samuel is an Anglican bishop in the Church of South India: he has been Bishop of Karnataka Central since 2009 and retired in 2023

Samuel was born in the Kolar Gold Fields. He was educated at Union Biblical Seminary, Yavatmal. He served two spells as Karnataka Central Diocesan Secretary before his consecration as its bishop.
