= Karnataka Central Diocese of the Church of South India =

Diocese of the Church of South India in Karnataka, India

Diocese of Karnataka Central Diocese
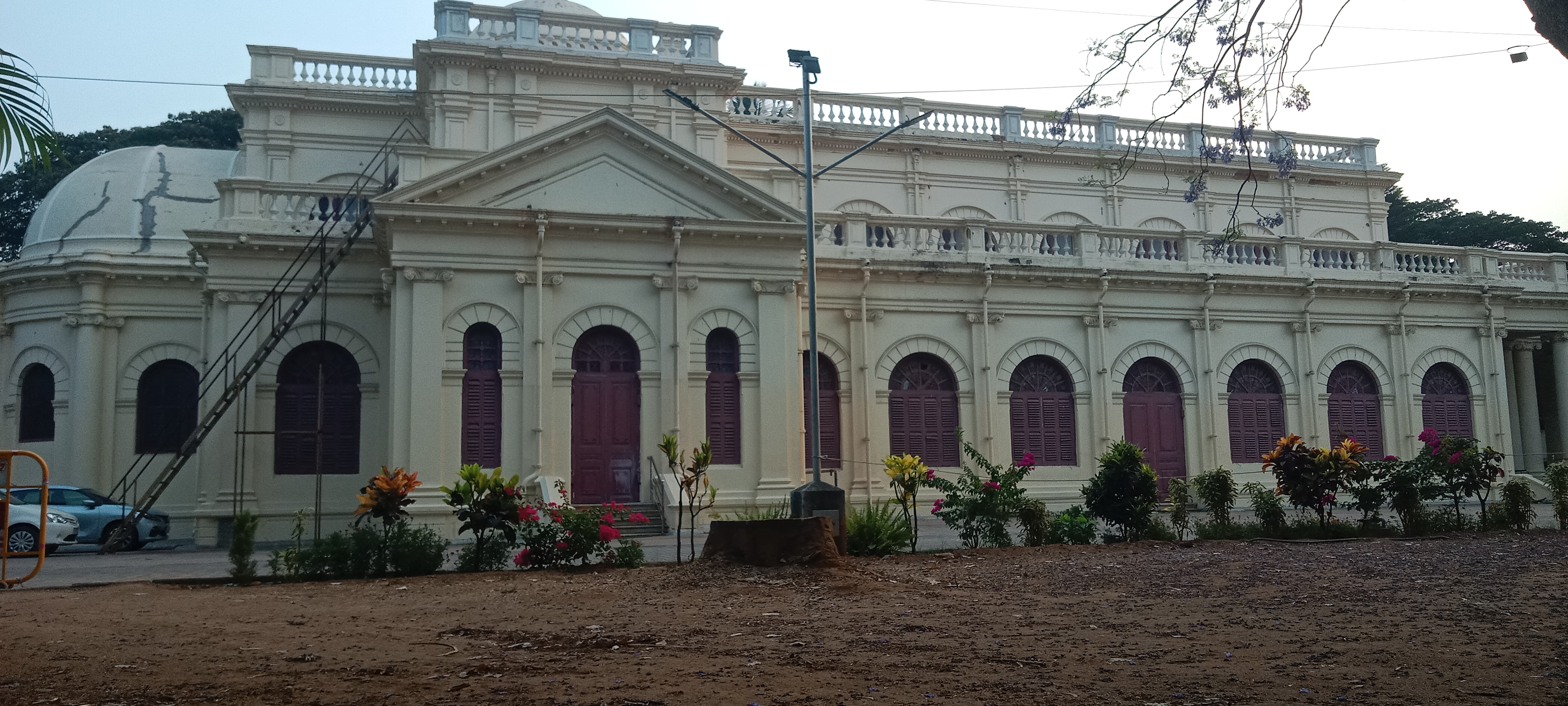
- St. Mark's Cathedral, Bengaluru

Location
- Country: India
- Ecclesiastical province: Church of South India

Statistics
- Congregations: 120

Information
- Cathedral: St. Mark's Cathedral, Bangalore

Current leadership
- Bishop: Rt Rev Dr Vincent Vinod Kumar

Website
- csikarnatakacentraldiocese.org

The Karnataka Central Diocese is one of the twenty-two dioceses of the Church of South India covering the central part of Karnataka. The Church of South India is a United Protestant denomination.

== History ==
The year 1810 witnessed the arrival of the first ever Protestant missionary, the Rev. John Hands of London Missionary Society at Bellary, Karnataka State (erstwhile Mysore). During the later part of the 19th century also witnessed the arrival of other missionary societies such as the Wesleyan Methodist Missionary Society (1821) Basel Mission (1834), the society of propagation of the Gospel and the Church Missionary Society. Except for the Basel Mission, the other Missions became part of the South Indian United Church (SIUC) which came into existence in 1908. The South Indian United Church (SIUC) was formed and sustained by the efforts of the Rev. Vedam Santiago of Madurai. When he envisioned the formation of the Church of South India a number of hurdles had to be crossed including those of caste. The Anglican Bishop Azariah was approached by Rev. V Santiago and persuaded to be a leading force in the bringing together of the varied churches in South India. Thus it was that Rev. V Santiago along with other SIUC leaders brought about the Church of South India under the later leadership of Bishop Azariah. When the Church of South India was formally inaugurated in 1947, Mysore Diocese was one of fourteen dioceses. Acceding to a proposal made by the Synod in 1964 to create smaller dioceses to provide better administration, the Diocese in 1969 approved the scheme for dividing the Diocese into three units. As a result of this division, the Central Karnataka diocese came into existence on 1 May 1970, on trifurcation of the then Mysore diocese.

Under the leadership of Bishop Norman C Sargant, the Mysore Diocese was trifurcated and the Mysore Central Diocese came into being in the year 1970. When Mysore was renamed as Karnataka then the Diocese also changed its name from Mysore Central Diocese to Karnataka Central Diocese.

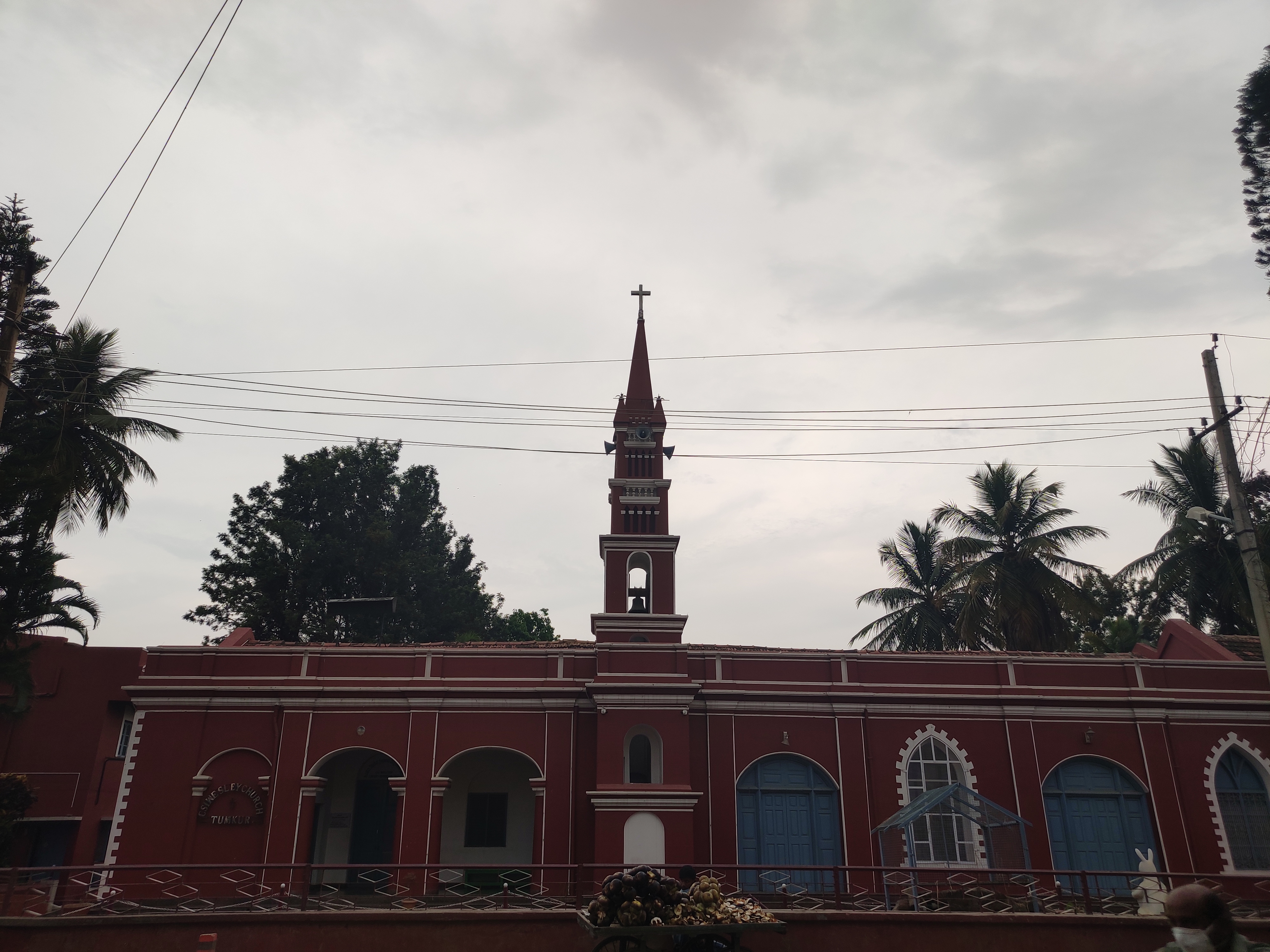
CSI Wesley Church, Tumkur

== About ==
The diocese has around 120 pastorates covering three major divisions viz Bangalore, Kolar Gold Fields and Tumkur.

== Bishops ==
Mysore Diocese

- Premaka Gurushantha (1947-1951)
- Norman C. Sargant (1951-1971)

Central Karnataka Diocese

- Ken Gill (1972-1980)
- C. D. Jathanna
- S. Vasantha Kumar (1996-2012)
- Prasana Kumar Samuel (2015–2023)

== Notable churches ==
=== CSI Christ Church, Hosur, Tamil Nadu ===
CSI Christ Church, Hosur is a church in the Karnataka Central Diocese under the Church of South India (CSI). The church is located in the center of the city of Hosur and has a high steeple. The entire church campus is filled with prayer and it is a ‘House of Prayer’ to all people. The church is kept open from 6 am to 8 pm to enable people seeking comfort and silence to come and surrender themselves to God in a place so filled with prayer. The Congregation of the Church is a community of believers from all over India as well as from abroad. The church community is also engaged in mission work. Being a prominent church of the Karnataka Central Diocese, the church supports other congregations, especially by participating in the life of rural congregations and ministries, and Diocesan institutions. The church, therefore, is a landmark in Church union and ecumenism.

=== St. Luke's Church, Bangalore ===
The British defeated Tipu Sultan in the Fourth Mysore war in 1799, they took over the Bangalore Fort and built a small chapel called Drummers chapel in 1803. This was the first church to be built in Bangalore. In 1812 this was shifted outside the fort area and was called the Fort church, which was used as a place of worship for English soldiers. Over a century this church ministered to the families living in the suburb area A need was felt by the Mysore government to construct Vani Vilas Hospital and it was found that this church in the fort area was in the way. The government allotted the present site for the new church. The foundation stone was laid by Sir Mirza Ismail the then Dewan of Mysore. It was completed and dedicated in the name of St. Luke by the Lord Bishop of Madras Rt. Rev. E H M Waller on 9 March 1935.

=== St. Mark's Cathedral, Bangalore ===
St. Mark's Cathedral was founded in 1808 and was completed in 1812. The Bishop of Calcutta consecrated this Cathedral in 1816. This Cathedral is a beautiful colonial structure having a graceful dome over a semicircular chancel. Roman archers along the walls are one of the most beautiful features of the cathedral. This cathedral was modeled along the lines of the 17th-century St Paul's Cathedral. The entrance has elaborate woodwork and ornate carvings coupled with majestically done ceilings and domes. The monument was enlarged in 1901 and rebuilt in 1927. The new structure is known for its stained glass work. The church is named after St. Mark, the author of St. Mark's gospel.

=== Holy Trinity Church, Bangalore ===
Holy Trinity Church, located at Trinity circle at the east end of the MG Road, is a major landmark in Bangalore. It was built in 1851, for the British Regiment stationed in Bangalore. Built in the English Renaissance style, the church is regarded as the largest "military" church in southern India.

=== Hudson Memorial Church, Bangalore ===
Hudson Memorial Church is one of the major landmarks of the city. It lies in the middle of Hudson circle near Bangalore City Corporation. The church was built in 1904, in memory of Rev Josiah Hudson. This impressive structure with a tower and several stained glass windows is an example for the neo-gothic style of architecture.

=== St.Andrew's Church, Bangalore ===
The foundation stone for this magnificent church structure was laid on 22 November 1864 by Lady Grant, wife of Lieutenant-General, Sir Hope Grant, the then Quartermaster-General of Her Majesty's Forces and the building was completed and opened for Divine worship on 18 November 1866.It started as a Scottish "kirk", and the edifice was completed to be opened for worship in 1866. The early congregation was almost entirely men and officers of the Scottish regiments from Britain stationed here and a few civilians of Scottish origin, all followers of the Presbyterian sect.

=== St. Paul's Church, Bangalore ===
St. Paul's Church is located in the corner of Old Poor House Road, and Bowring Hospital Road, next to the Bowring and Lady Curzon Hospital, Bangalore Cantonment. St. Paul's has the distinction of being the very first Tamil Anglican Church in the erstwhile Mysore State. It celebrated its 175th anniversary in May 2014.

=== St. John's Church ===
St. John's Church is located in St. John's Hill, Cleveland Town, Bangalore Cantonment, in between Promenade Road and St. John's Church Road. The church is the fourth oldest Protestant church in the city, with a distinct red edifice and towering steeple, rising out of the leafy surroundings.

=== Rice Memorial Church ===
The Rice Memorial Church is located in the busy Avenue Road, Bangalore Pete. It is named after the Rev. Benjamin Holt Rice, a missionary of the London Missionary Society (LMS), a Canarese scholar and a pioneer of education in the Bangalore Pete region. The Rice Memorial Church stands on a busy street in the midst of temple, dragahs, book shops and heavy traffic, with its colonial British structure appearing to be out of place in the traditional Bangalore market district. The church stands on the site of the Canarese Chapel built by Rice.

=== Hudson Memorial Church, Bangalore ===
The Hudson Memorial Church is located in the Bangalore Pete, Hudson Circle, surrounded by the Office of the Bangalore Corporation, Ulsoor Gate Police Station, Cubbon Park and Kanteerava Stadium. The church was established in 1904, and is a Kannada CSI church. The church has around 4000 registered members and is named after Rev. Josiah Hudson, a missionary, Canarese scholar and educationist who started many Canarese schools in the Bangalore Petah region. The church was earlier known as the Wesleyan Mission Canarese Chapel, and was located in Ganikara Street, Nagarathpet , and moved the current location at Hudson Circle and renamed as Hudson Memorial Church in 1904. The church attracts people of all faiths, who visit the church to seek blessing, especially in Thursdays and Sundays.

=== East Parade Church ===
The East Parade Church is a located on Bangalore, in the Bangalore Cantonment. The church comes under the Karnataka Central Diocese of the Church of South India. Started in the early 19th century as the Wesleyan Mission Chapel by Wesleyan believers of the Madras Army with Tamil and English services, the Church now has services in Tamil and Malayalam. The name East Parade comes from its location on the East of the Parade Grounds of the Madras Engineer Group (MEG) regiment. The first Indian priest to be put in charge of East Parade Church was the Rev. Samuel David. The present church building was raised in 1865, on the site of the old Wesleyan Mission Chapel, with an inscription dated 6 October 1863 marking the laying of the foundation stone.

=== William Arthur Memorial Church, Gubbi ===
The William Arthur Memorial Church is located on the Bangalore-Honavar Road at Gubbi Town, about 80 km from Bangalore. The church is painted turquoise blue and built in the Gothic style, being completed in 1904. The church is named after William Arthur, an Irish Wesleyan missionary and Canarese Scholar, who served in Gubbi. The present structure replacing the old Gobbee Chapel, built by Thomas Hodson and William Arthur.

=== St. Michael's and All Angels' Church, Oorgaum ===
St. Michael's and All Angels' Church is located at Oorgaum, Kolar Gold Fields, India. The church stands on Cooke Road, near the KGF Club, south of the Catholic Mother of Mines Church. The origin of the church goes back to 1899, and was for the exclusive use of the (white) officers of the John Taylor and Sons, London, which owned the gold mines at Kolar Gold Fields (KGF), Mysore State.

== Educational institutions ==
Colleges

- Bishop Cotton Women's Christian College
- Bishop Cotton Women's Christian Law College
- Bishop Cotton Academy of Professional Management
- United Mission Degree College
- Goodwill Women's Christian Degree College

Schools

- Bishop Cotton Girls' School
- Bishop Cotton Boys' School
- Cathedral Composite Pre-University College & High School
- St.John's High School
- Goodwills Girl's High School, Near Coles Park, Fraser Town, Bangalore
- United Mission Composite Pre-University College & High School
- Bishop Sargant School & College, Tumkur
- Church of England Zenana Mission (CEZM) School (Urdu Medium)
- Methodist Mission High School
- Mitralaya Composite Pre-University College & High School

== See also ==
- Karnataka Northern Diocese
- Karnataka Southern Diocese
- Church of South India
- Church of North India
