= Prabhakara Rao =

Prabhakara Rao was the fourth Bishop of Northern Karnataka of the Church of South India:
