= Diocese of Northern Karnataka of the Church of South India =

Diocese of the Church of South India in Karnataka, India

Diocese of Karnataka Northern Diocese

Location
- Country: India
- Ecclesiastical province: Church of South India

Statistics
- Congregations: 85

Information
- Cathedral: Holy Name Cathedral, Hubli

Current leadership
- Bishop: Martin C Borgai

Karnataka Northern Diocese is one among the twenty-two dioceses of the Church of South India which covers the churches in the northern part of Karnataka state. The Church of South India is a United Protestant denomination.

== History of the Diocese ==
Protestantism spread here mainly through the activities of the Basel Missionaries who came from Germany around 1836.

== About ==
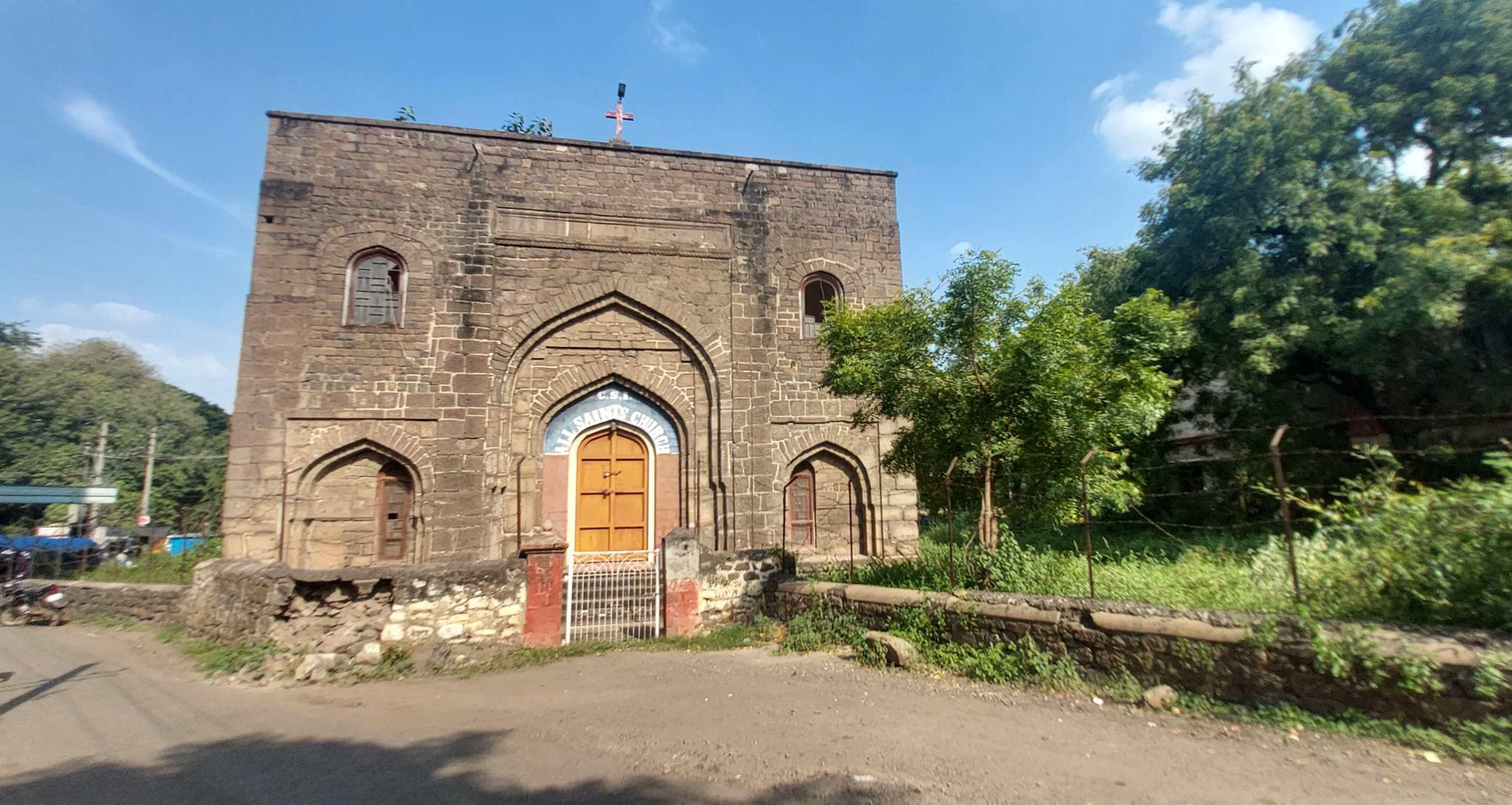
All Saints Church of Bijapur in Karnataka

The diocese has the purview of 12 districts in Karnataka state consisting of Bellary, Bijapur, Chitradurga, Dharwad, Shimoga, Uttar Kannada, Haveri, Davangeri, Gadag, Koppal and Bagalkot . The diocese has 85 churches under its administration. The headquarters of the Karnataka Northern Diocese is at Dharwad.

== List of bishops ==
Erstwhile Mysore Diocese

- Premaka Gurushantha (1947-1951)
- Norman C. Sargant (1951-1971)

Karnataka Northern Diocese

- 1970–1980, William Karl,
- 1981-, Vasant P. Dandin,
- Paul Balmi,
- Prabhakara Rao,
- 2012-, Ravikumar Niranjan (2012–2021)
- Dr Martin C Borgai

== Notable Churches under the Diocese ==
=== Abraham Church, Anand Nagar Church, Hubli ===
Established on 1988, this church is among the most diverse churches in Hubli. Mainly it serves the citizens of Anandnagr, Manjunathnagar, Old Hubli, JP Nagar, and other adjacent areas.

Located right next to Anandnagar bus stand and have access to basic amenities and can accommodate over 150 worshipers.

=== Holy Name Cathedral, Hubli ===
In 1919, A L Bradbury was posted to India to preach and train the backward community as well as prisoners as per the orders of Mr Start. Accordingly, Bradbury came to Hubli and started holding religious meetings. In 1925, Bradbury decided to build a church in Ghantikeri area. The foundation for this church was laid by Remington in 1928, who named it as ‘Holy Name’. Bradbury took the help of prisoners in constructing the church. The new church was inaugurated on 7 August 1928 by Wilson. The church was declared as Holy Name Cathedral on 1 May 1970 and included in Karnataka Northern Diocese. This church has a distinction of having ordained the first Indian bishop William Karl on 25 April 1971.

=== All Saints Church, Dharwad ===
The All Saints Church located on Dharwad Halyal Road is one of the oldest churches in Dharwad, about 20 km from Hubli. This Anglican church was constructed in the year 1888 in European style of architecture.

=== CSI EL-Bethel Church Hosur Hubballi ===
The church was established in 1998. Residents of areas such as Hosur, Vikas Nagar, Siddlingeshwar Park, Rajdhani colony attend services here.

== Educational Institutions under Diocese ==
Basel Mission Higher Education centre and Basel Mission Primary Education Centre which runs 22 educational institutions comes under Karnataka Northern Diocese.

- Degree Colleges -4
- Junior Colleges-2
- High Schools -7
- Eng. Med. Schools -3
- Primary Schools -16
- Teachers Training College-1

== See also ==
- Church of South India
- Central Karnataka Diocese
- Church of North India
