= Robert Scheuermeier =

Swiss Christian minister (1927–2021)

The Reverend Robert Scheuermeier, SRC D.D. honoris causa (Serampore) (2013)
- Born: 31 July 1927; Bern, Switzerland
- Died: 25 January 2021 (aged 93)
- Education: University of Bern, Bern (Switzerland) (1947–1949; 1950–1952); The Faculty of Theology of Montpellier (France) (1946–1947); University of Basel, Basel (Switzerland) (1949–1950)
- Occupation: Priest
- Parent(s): Dr. Nellie Scheuermeier-Nicolet (Mother) and Dr. als:Paul Scheuermeier (Father)
- Religion: Christianity
- Church: Swiss Reformed Church (SRC)
- Ordained: 1952, Swiss Reformed Church of the canton of Bern, Switzerland
- Writings: Scheuermeier, Robert (2009). "The Concept of Partnership: Its Prospects and Problems". In Shiri, Godwin (ed.). Wholeness in Christ: The Legacy of the Basel Mission in India. KATHRI, Mangalore. pp. 312 ff.
- Congregations served: Utzenstorf (1952-54), Reichenbach im Kandertal (1954-56), Kirchberg, Bern (1967-81)
- Offices held: Principal; Basel Mission Theological Seminary, Mangalore (1960-1965); Karnataka Theological College, Mangalore(1965-67); Asia Secretary, EMS, Stuttgart (1982-1992)
- Title: The Reverend

Robert Scheuermeier (31 July 1927 – 25 January 2021) was a Swiss Christian minister and academic administrator. He was the first Principal of the Karnataka Theological College, Mangalore, a Seminary affiliated to the country's first University, the Senate of Serampore College (University), Serampore.

== Ecclesiastical ministry ==
=== Switzerland ===
Scheuermeier was ordained in 1952 by the Swiss Reformed Church of the canton of Bern, Switzerland and held ministerial roles at the Churches in Utzenstorf from 1952 to 1954 and at Reichenbach im Kandertal from 1954 to 1956. After a decade of overseas work in India from 1957 to 1967, Scheuermeier resumed the role of a Minister, this time at Kirchberg, Bern from 1967 till 1981.

=== India ===
Scheuermeier came to India in 1957 and undertook language studies in Kannada for a year and began to teach at the Basel Mission Theological Seminary (BEMTS) at Mangalore. In 1960, when S. J. Samartha, the Seminary Principal moved to the United Theological College, Bangalore to teach Religions, the Seminary Council appointed Scheuermeier as the Seminary Principal.

By this time, ecumenical conversations were taking place to merge the Basel Mission with the Church of South India. As a prelude to it, the two vernacular medium (Kannada) Protestant regional seminaries in Karnataka affiliated to the Senate of Serampore College (University), namely,

- the Basel Mission Theological Seminary, Mangalore formed in 1847 (managed by the Basel Mission) and
- the Union Kanarese Seminary, Tumkur formed in 1915 (managed by the Church of South India),

were merged in 1965 resulting in the formation of the Karnataka Theological College in the premises of the erstwhile Basel Mission Theological Seminary in Mangalore. Scheuermeier was appointed as the first principal of the new entity, a post which he held for two years until 1967, when he left India for good making the College Council to appoint the Old Testament Scholar C. D. Jathanna, who had by that time returned from the University of Hamburg, Germany where he was pursuing doctoral studies.

=== Germany ===
While Scheuermeier was ministering at Kirchberg, Bern, he was appointed as India Secretary in 1982 at the Stuttgart-based Association of Churches and Missions in South Western Germany/Mission in Solidarity and entrusted with the task of building up theological education of the partner Church in India, the Church of South India and made efforts to forge greater ties for building up ecclesiastical cooperation among the Dioceses within the Church of South India and the Association of Churches and Missions in South Western Germany. The continued representation of the EMS in the Church of South India synods as well as in the Society of the United Theological College, Bangalore attests to this fact. When Scheuermeier retired from the EMS, Stuttgart on attaining superannuation, he pitched for having an Indian as India Secretary at the EMS resulting in the appointment of C. L. Furtado in 1992 to succeed Scheuermeier.

== Contribution ==
In the postcolonialism scenario, Scheuermeier who was teaching in Mangalore from 1958 onwards was a strong advocate for the development of Indian christian theology, an indigenous theology free from western influence. K. M. George who authored Church of South India, Life in Union 1947-1997 covering a period of 50 years right from the founding of the Church of South India in 1947 till 1997, wrote that the Basel Mission merged into the Church of South India in 1968 as a result of protracted ecumenical efforts that began as early as 1936.

Scheuermeier was part of the ecumenical talks between the Basel Mission and the Church of South India in his capacity as Principal of the Basel Mission Theological Seminary in Mangalore.

== Death ==
Robert Scheuermeier died on 25 January 2021, at the age of 93.

== Recognition and honour ==
In 2013, the country's first University, the Senate of Serampore College (University) conferred the honorary doctorate degree by honoris causa upon Scheuermeier.

Other offices
| Preceded by Walther Gengnagel | India Secretary, Missionswerk Südwestdeutschland (Mission in Solidarity); Stuttgart; 1982–1992 | Succeeded by C. L. Furtado; 1992–1997 |
Academic offices
| Preceded by Post Created | Principal, Karnataka Theological College, Mangalore; 1965–1967 | Succeeded by C. D. Jathanna; 1967–1983 |
| Preceded by S. J. Samartha; 1952–1960 | Principal, Basel Mission Theological Seminary, Mangalore; 1960–1965 | Succeeded by Post disbanded |
Awards
| Preceded by Zacharias Mar Theophilus, James Alan Bergquist, Hrilrokhum Thiek 2012 | Doctor of Divinity Degree (honoris causa); Senate of Serampore College (University); 2013 | Succeeded by Dietrich Werner; 2014 |
