= D. P. Shettian =

- Bishop in Karnataka Southern Diocese of Church of South India
- Church: Christian
- Diocese: Karnataka Southern Diocese
- See: Church of South India
- In office: 1989-1997
- Predecessor: S. R. Furtado
- Successor: C. L. Furtado
- Previous post(s): Rector, Shanthi Cathedral, Mangalore

Orders
- Consecration: 14 May 1989 by The Most Right Reverend Victor Premasagar, Moderator and the Right Reverend D. Pothirajulu, Deputy Moderator, Church of South India Synod

Personal details
- Born: 29 June 1932; Kallianpur, Udupi, Karnataka
- Died: 2 September 2006; Mangalore, Karnataka

D. P. Shettian (29 June 1932 – 2 September 2006) was the second Bishop - in - Karnataka Southern Diocese of Church of South India headquartered in Mangalore where the Bishop's Cathedra is placed at the CSI-Shanthi Cathedral, Balmatta, Mangalore.

== Studies ==
Shettian pursued an upgrading course leading to Bachelor of Divinity at the United Theological College, Bangalore during the years 1960-1961 during the Principalship of Joshua Russell Chandran after which the Senate of Serampore College (University) awarded a graduate degree during the Registrarship of C. Devasahayam.

Religious titles
Preceded by S. R. Furtado; 1970-1978	Bishop - in - Karnataka Southern Diocese; Mangalore; Church of South India; 1989-1997	Succeeded by C. L. Furtado; 1997-2004
