= William Arthur (minister) =

Irish Wesleyan Methodist minister and author

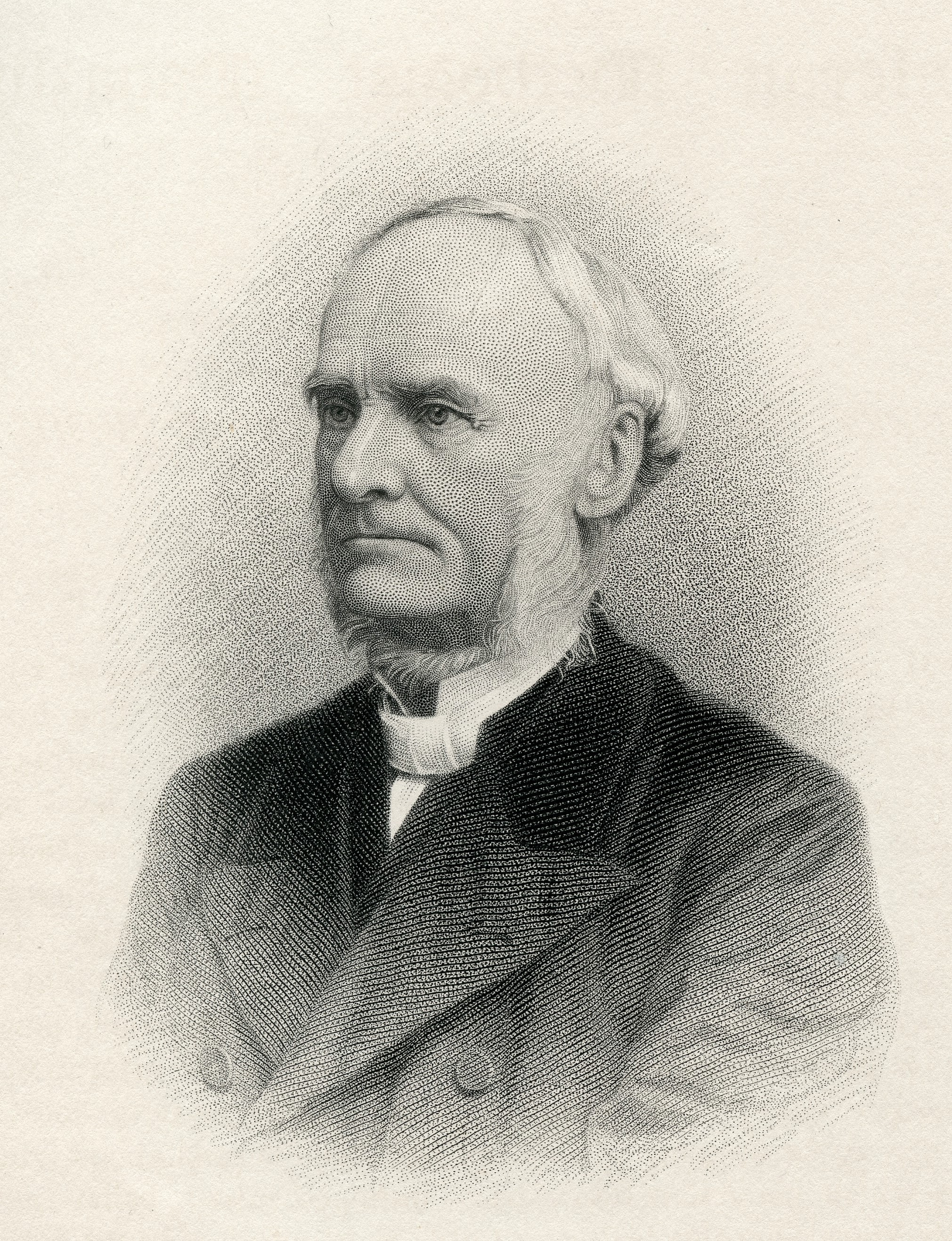
- Rev. William Arthur

President of the Methodist Conference
- In office 1866–1867
- Preceded by: William Shaw
- Succeeded by: John Bedford

Personal details
- Born: 3 February 1819 Newport, County Mayo
- Died: 21 March 1901 (aged 82)
- Occupation: Methodist minister, author

William Arthur (3 February 1819 – 21 March 1901) was an Irish Wesleyan Methodist minister and author.

== Biography ==
Born at Newport, in County Mayo, eight miles from Castlebar, Arthur was educated at Horton College, and at the age of twenty was sent to Goobbee, in Southern India, where he was engaged for several years in missionary work in the Mysore. While there his progress in the Canarese language is said to have been remarkable; but being threatened with blindness, he was obliged to return to Europe, and was employed for three years in advocating with much ability the Indian missionary work of the Wesleyan Society. He acted in his ministerial capacity in Paris from 1846 to 1849; then for seventeen years he filled the post of secretary to the Methodist Missionary Society. In 1867 he was elected Principal of the Methodist College Belfast, and continued to fill that office until 1871, when he resigned, but still maintained his connection with the Conference as honorary missionary secretary. In 1866-67 he was President of the Wesleyan Conference.

His intimate knowledge of India and its people made his counsel valuable to statesmen; and it was widely acknowledged that he was a power outside his own Church, and an aggressive proponent of Christianity. Arthur suffered various infirmities throughout his life, but lived to the age of 83, dying in Cannes, France.

== Works ==
Arthur was best known as the author of numerous pamphlets and books including:

- A Mission to the Mysore, with Scenes and Facts Illustrative of India, its People, and its Religion (1847)
- The Successful Merchant— Sketches of the Life of Mr Samuel Budgett (1852)
  - This was a bestseller: in the UK a 43rd edition was published in 1878 by William Mullan and Son.
  - In the US, editions included: Swormstedt & Poe, Cincinnati (1856), Carlton & Phillips, New York (1853) and D. Appleton, New York (1857).
  - It was also translated into Welsh
- The Tongue of Fire, or true Power of Christianity (1856)
- Italy in Transition: Public Scenes and Private Opinions in the Spring of 1860, illustrated by Official Documents from the Papal Archives of the Revolted Legations (1860)

His lecture on Systematic Beneficence gave the first impetus to that movement; and his own practice was referred to as a living example of it.

== William Arthur Memorial Church, Gubbi, 1904 ==
The William Arthur Memorial Church is located on the NH206 Bangalore-Honavar Road at Gubbi Town, about 80 km from Bangalore. The church is painted turquoise blue and built in the Gothic style, being completed in 1904. The church is named after William Arthur, an Irish Wesleyan missionary and Canarese Scholar, who served in Gubbi. The present structure replacing the old Gobbee Chapel, built by Thomas Hodson and William Arthur.
