= Premaka Gurushantha =

Bishop in India

- Bishop in Church of South India Diocese of Mysore
- Church: Christian
- Diocese: Church of South India Diocese of Mysore
- See: Church of South India
- In office: 1947–1950
- Successor: Norman C. Sargant
- Previous posts: Principal, Union Kanarese Seminary, Tumkur (now merged into Karnataka Theological College)

Orders
- Consecration: 4 October 1947

Personal details
- Born: 2 September 1887 Tumkur, Karnataka

Premaka Gurushantha (born 2 September 1887, died 1950) was the first bishop in the Church of South India Diocese of Mysore.

Gurushantha studied divinity at the United Theological College, Bangalore between 1912 and 1916

Gurushantha hailed from a Methodist background; in 1947 he was consecrated as bishop along with eight others at St. George's Cathedral, Chennai.

Religious titles
Preceded by Post created	Bishop – in – CSI-Diocese of Mysore; 1947–1950	Succeeded by Norman C. Sargant; 1951–1970
Academic offices
Preceded by	Principal, Union Kanarese Seminary, Tumkur -1947	Succeeded by
