= Norman C. Sargant =

- Bishop in Church of South India Diocese of Mysore
- Church: Christian
- Diocese: Diocese of Mysore
- See: Church of South India
- In office: 1951–1970
- Predecessor: Premaka Gurushantha
- Successor: Kenneth E. Gill

Orders
- Consecration: 12 April 1951 at St. Mark's Cathedral, Bangalore

Personal details
- Born: 3 January 1909 Highgate, London, UK
- Died: 17 September 1982 (aged 73) Bristol, UK

Norman Carr Sargant (3 January 1909 – 17 September 1982) was the second Bishop in Church of South India Diocese of Mysore. Norman was the brother of Thomas Sargant and William Sargant.

Sargant was educated at The Leys School, Cambridge and Handsworth Theological College. He came to India as a Methodist Missionary in 1931 and was a member of the Church History Association of India.

== Writings ==
Norman C. Sargant wrote the following books,

- Date unknown, History of the Protestant Church (in Karnataka),
- Date unknown, My Dear Boy: Letters from Norman Thomas Carr Sargant to His Son Norman Carr Sargant : September 1939 – January 1946,
- Date unknown, The Life Story of an Indian Minister: The Rev. Henry Premaka, 1850–1922,
- 1940, The Dispersion of the Tamil Church,
- 1944, A Letter from Mysore,
- 1952, W. E. Tomlinson: a memoir and some papers,
- 1963, The Lingayats: The Vira-Saiva Religion,
- 1963, A charge delivered by Norman Carr Sargant, second bishop in Mysore, at a meeting of the presbyters and deacons attending the ninthe Diocesan Council at Hubli, November 14th 1963,
- 1976, India : A Christian View,
- 1985, India, My Appointed Place": An Account of Mary Carpenter's Four Journeys to India,
- 1987, From Missions to Church in Karnataka, 1920–1950. This book is preserved at the National Library, Government of India, New Delhi,
- 1987, Mary Carpenter in India,

== Records ==
Papers of Norman Sargant are held at the Cadbury Research Library, University of Birmingham

Religious titles
Preceded by Premaka Gurushantha; 1947–1950	Bishop – in – CSI-Diocese of Mysore; 1951–1970	Succeeded by Kenneth E. Gill; 1972–1980
