= Gubbi =

- Town
- Location in Karnataka, India
- Coordinates: 13°18′43″N 76°56′23″E
- Country: India
- State: Karnataka
- District: Tumakuru
- Talukas: Gubbi

Government
  - Type: Town Panchayath

Area
  - Total: 6.67 km^{2} (2.58 sq mi)

Languages
  - Official: Kannada
- Time zone: UTC+5:30 (IST)
- PIN: 572216
- Telephone code: 91-(0)8131
- Nearest city: Tumakuru
- Lok Sabha constituency: Tumakuru
- Vidhan Sabha constituency: Gubbi
- Website: www.gubbitown.mrc.gov.in

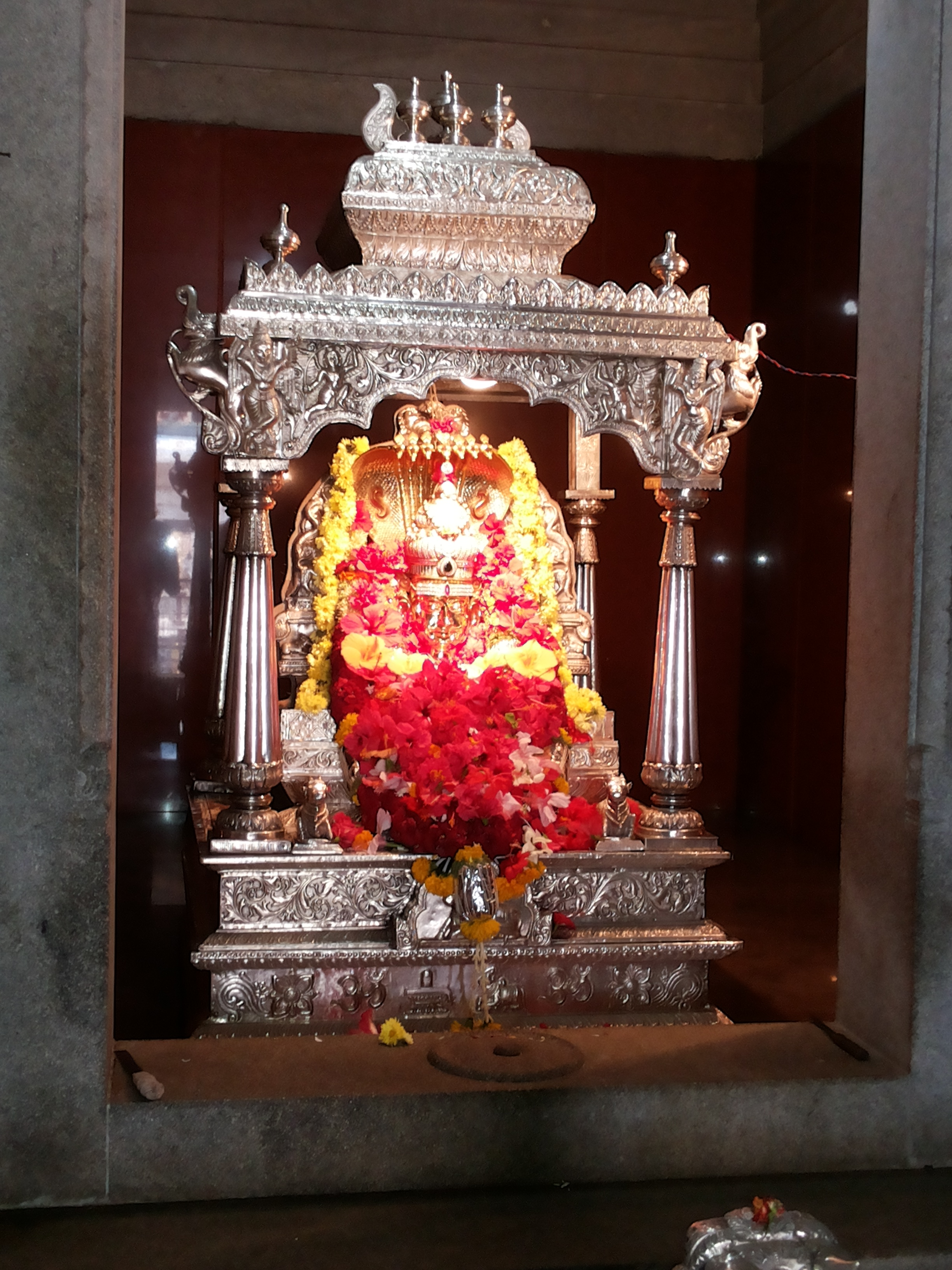
Gosala Shree Chennabasaveshwara Swamy

Gubbi, formerly known as Amaragonda, is a town located in the Tumakuru District of Karnataka, India. It lies 20 km from Tumakuru and 90 km from Bengaluru along NH-206 (BH Road). Gubbi ULB (Urban Local Bodies) contains 17 wards and an equal number of councillors. The population of Gubbi was 18,446 in 2011, and it has an area of 6.67 sq. km. Gubbi is famous for the Gosala Sri Channabasaveshwara Swamy Temple of the Veerashaiva sect and Sri Chidambarashrama. S. R. Srinivas represents Gubbi at the Karnataka Legislative Assembly.

== Economy ==
Due to its railway station and national highway (NH 206), Gubbi is a major business hub for smaller neighbouring villages and towns. It also has a Chidambarashrama, which was founded in 1940 by the saint Sri Chidambara Swamiji.

== Education ==
Gubbi has a number of educational institutes, such as the Government Junior College. Gubbi also has schools affiliated with boards like Priya English School (state board), Shubodaya School (state board), Venkateshwara School (state board), Vivekananda Vidya Peeta (state board), CIT public School (CBSE), Green Wood International School (CBSE), Bhoomi Public School (ICSE), Government Junior College for Girls, Stella Marys English School (state), Chidambara Public School (state)and Elite International School (CBSE).

== History ==
=== Tradition ===
Gubbi was founded in the 16th century by the Nonaba Vokkaliga Chief of Hosahalli. It is named after a traditional belief that two gubbachchis (sparrows)—which used to listen to Amaragunda Mallikarjuna, a Virashaiva saint, expound the Puranas—fell dead on the day that the exposition was concluded. Swami Sri Chidambara was a saint extraordinary in the Chidambara tradition, like his mentor, Swami Narayana Bhagawan, a great sage. Born in 1889, he was closely associated with Sri Narasimha Swamiji and Sri Radhakrishna Swamiji. He walked to the Himalayas several times and performed penance there. He was persuaded by his friend and disciple, Professor T S Venkannaiah, to stay in Karnataka to serve the society. He established Chidambarashrama at Gubbi in 1940, combining spirituality with social service at a place known to him to be an ancient Durga Kshetra. He consecrated his Upasana Deva Sri Dattatreya and the ancient Maruti deity for spreading Sanatana Dharma and Vedic education. The ashram has the combination of Sri Dattatreya and Anjaneya and is known as Dattanjaneya Kshetra.

=== Thomas Hodson's Description of Gubbi ===
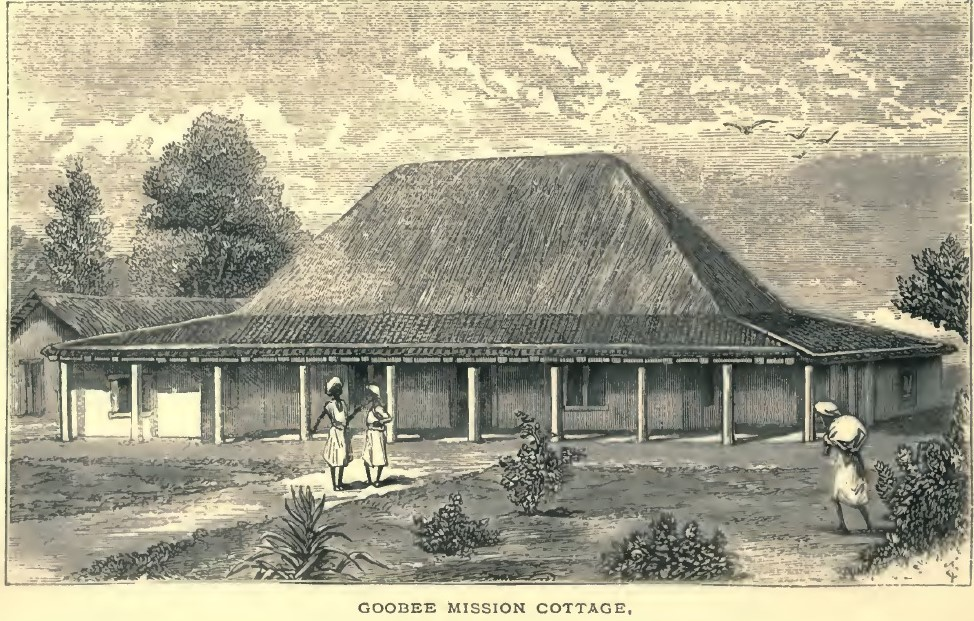
Goobee Mission Cottage, 1837 (Hodson, 1877, p.46)

The Mission Station at Gubbi was started in April 1837 by Thomas Hodson and his wife. Initially, they lived in tents, but over time they built mud cottages with thatched roofs (see figure). The mud walls of the house were 6 ft. high, and the house had a few small rooms. The house was cool during the hot seasons, but leaked in the rain. Hodson noted in his description of Gubbi: the low, flat land; a well, irrigated from a tank; and a paddy. He also described large clumps of trees and tracts of uncultivated land which were used as common pasture for sheep and cows, as well as shepherd boys, who usually had a handmade flute and played a sweet tune. Deer were commonly seen outside the mission house.

=== William Arthur's Description of Gubbi ===
The following description of Gubbi in the early/mid–19th century was narrated by William Arthur in his book A Mission to the Mysore, with Scenes and Facts Illustrative of India, its People, and its Religion. It was published in 1847.

Gubbi was located about 60 miles NW of Bangalore and had a population of between 6000 and 7000 people. The town people traded items such as coffee, grains, and betel-nut, which were purchased from Nuggur (Bednore) and sold in the markets of Bangalore and Wallajanuggur (Vellore). The residents were prosperous from this trade and town had a weekly market. At that time, the exchange rate for the British Indian Rupee was 2 British shillings (BINR 10 = British £1). Labour was cheap, costing as little as BINR 3 (6 British Shillings) a month. The cost of grains, spices, and rent were minimal, and the fuel used for cooking was cow dung. Generally 1 meal was cooked hot and eaten, and the other meal eaten cold. A man with BINR 10 was comfortable, one with BINR 20 respectable, one with BINR 50 was prosperous, and one with BINR 100 was wealthy. However, the cost of living and salaries were much higher in British Indian cities.

Gubbi, like other Indian cities, was surrounded by a mud wall used to repel wild beasts and thugs. The term town (oor) applied only to places with both a market and a wall, village (hully) was one with a wall but not a market, hamlet (palya) consisted of houses with neither market or wall, and city (patna) was the seat of power. Villages had only 1 gate, towns 2 gates at opposite ends. Gubbi had 2 main streets, intersected with minor streets. At one end of the mud fort lived rich merchants. On the other side of the village, which was avoided by the higher caste, lived lower caste people. There was a clear demarcation between higher castes and lower castes, with higher caste people refusing to cross into what they considered a polluted land.

— William Arthur,

=== William Arthur Memorial Church ===
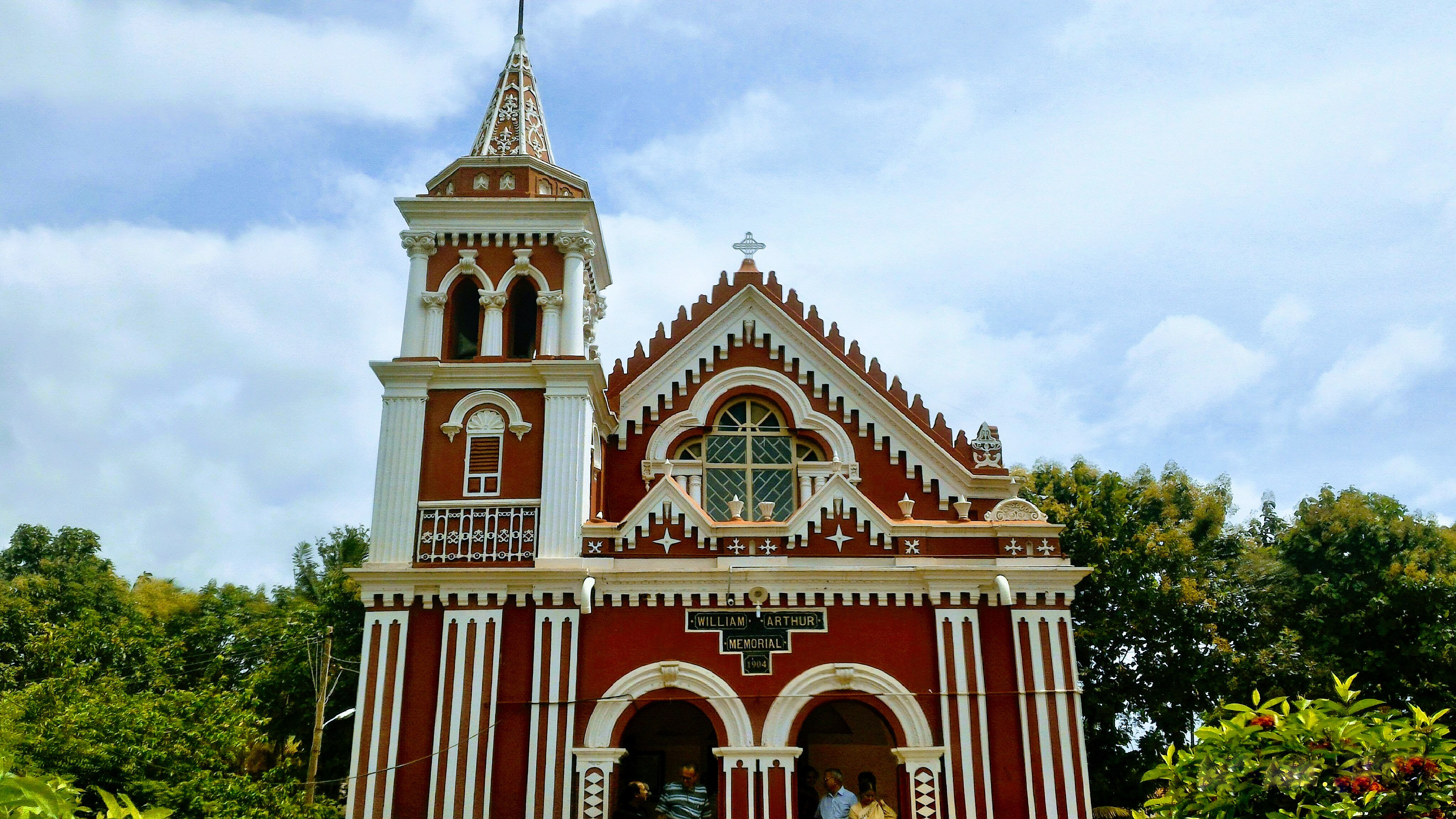
William Arthur Church

The William Arthur Memorial Church is located on the Bangalore-Honavar Road at Gubbi Town, about 80 km from Bangalore. It was named after William Arthur, an Irish Wesleyan missionary and Canarese scholar who served in Gubbi. The church is painted turquoise blue, built in a Gothic style, and was completed in 1904. The present structure, which replaced the old Gubbi Chapel, was built by Thomas Hodson and William Arthur.

== Hoblis in Gubbi ==
There are six hoblis in Gubbi taluk including Hagalavadi, Chelur, Nitturu, Gubbi (Kasaba hobli), Kadaba and C. S. Pura.

== Transport ==
Gubbi railway station lies on the Bangalore-Arsikere-Hubli line.

== Notable people ==
- Gubbi Veeranna, theatre personality
- Salumarada Thimmakka, environmentalist
- Chi. Udayashankar, Kannada film lyricist
- Nirmalananda Swamiji
- G. S. Paramashivaiah
- G. N. Lakshmipathy

== See also ==
- Hagalavadi
- Bukkapatna
