= New Jerusalem Church, Tranquebar =

New Jerusalem Church
- Tranquebar Lutheran Church
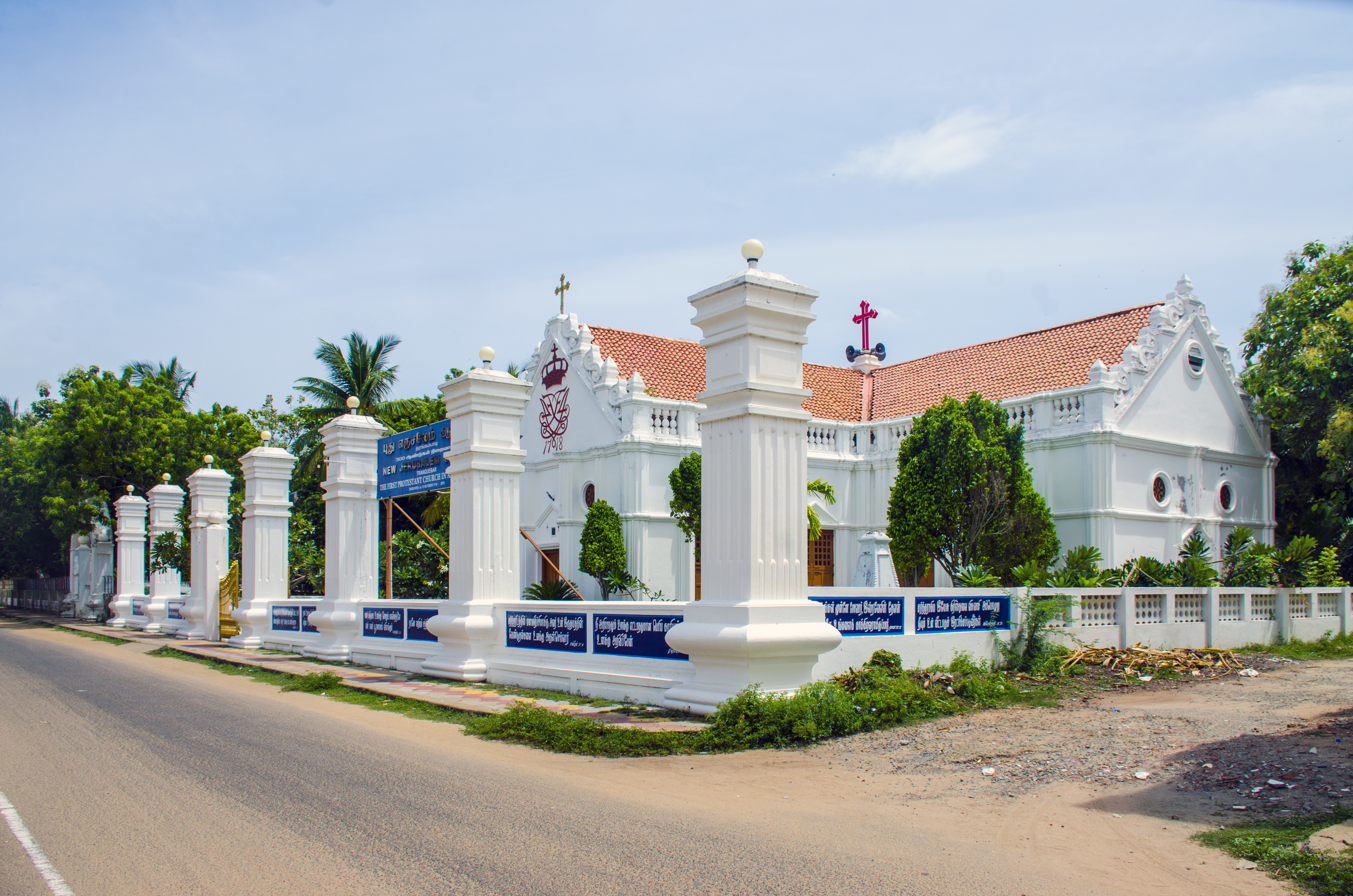
- New Jerusalem Church
- 11°01′38″N 79°51′15″E
- Location: Tranquebar, Tamil Nadu
- Country: India
- Denomination: TELC
- Tradition: Lutheran Pietism

History
- Consecrated: 11 October 1718

Architecture
- Style: Danish
- Years built: 1717–1718
- Groundbreaking: 9 February 1717
- Completed: 11 October 1718

Clergy
- Bishop: Johnson Gnanabaranam

The New Jerusalem Church (Tamil: புதிய எருசலேம் தேவாலயம், தரங்கம்பாடி) was built in 1718 by the Royal Danish missionary Bartholomaeus Ziegenbalg in the coastal town of Tranquebar, India, which was at that time a Danish India colony. The church is located on King Street, and church services are conducted every Sunday. The church, along with other buildings of the Tranquebar Mission, was damaged during the tsunami of 2004, and were renovated at a cost of INR 7 million, and re-consecrated in 2006.

== History ==
In 1620, the village of Tranquebar was acquired for the Danish Crown, by the Danish Admiral Ove Gjedde, by signing an agreement with the Raghunatha Nayak of the Tanjore Nayak Kingdom on behalf of the King of Denmark.

=== Jerusalem Church, Tranquebar (1707) ===
In 1707, Bartholomäus Ziegenbalg helped establish the Jerusalem Church at Tranquebar for the Lutheran congregation, as the existing Zion Church was reluctant to accept native worshippers. The Tamil converts also did not want to worship in the European Zion Church, as they had negative opinions about their lifestyle and morals. Starting from 1 October 1706, Ziegenbalg organised the Tamil congregation on Sundays at his house, which was used as a school on other days. The services were held in Tamil and Portuguese which was the lingua franca at that time. Governor Hassius donated 20000 bricks towards the cause of raising the new church at Tranquebar, and also allotted land at the Sollingar quarter of the colony. The foundation for the Jerusalem Church was laid on 14 June 1707. The church was named as Jerusalem Church, after the Francke Foundations in Halle which was considered as the New Jerusalem. The registers of the church commenced on 12 May 1707, and indicate most of the congregation were servants of Europeans, former converts from Roman Catholicism, many children and women. In general, the congregation represented the lowest of Tamil society at that time. Gradually, the congregation increased, and within a year of consecration a need for a larger church was realised. A tsunami stuck Tranquebar on 27 November 1715, destroying the city walls and many buildings. Even though the Jerusalem Church was undamaged, that it was close to the sea made it vulnerable. Hence, there was an urgent need to raise another church in Tranquebar.

=== New Jerusalem Church, Tranquebar (1718) ===
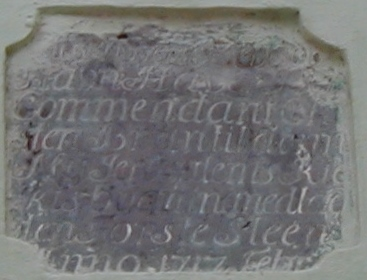
Foundation Stone in Danish (1717), New Jerusalem Church

Within a year, the 1707 Jerusalem Church was filled to capacity, with many people being forced to stand near the windows and doors of the church, for the lack of space. Appeals for funds were made to Johann Georg von Holstein the privy counsellor to King Frederick IV in October 1713, and to the Society for Promoting Christian Knowledge (SPCK) London. The widow of Commissioner Heinrich Bonsack (died 1711) sold her house and garden, which was on the right side of the missionaries garden, to the Tranquebar Mission. Further after the return of Ziegenbalg from Europe, Governor C B Lundegaard sold the empty land between the houses of the missionaries for 100 royal dollars. Then, the mission had a large land for building the church.

On 9 February 1717, Governor Christian Brun laid the foundations of the New Jerusalem Church, Tranquebar. A copper plate Danish inscription to this effect was placed. Further, the governor also gave duty-free status for the materials used for building the church and also appointed to two master artisans to oversee the work. The New Jerusalem Church was consecrated on 11 October 1718, the birthday of King Frederick IV. Danish pastors Jonas Smit and Jacob Clementin took part in the consecration services. The sermons during the consecration were preached in Tamil and Portuguese.

== Bartholomäus Ziegenbalg ==
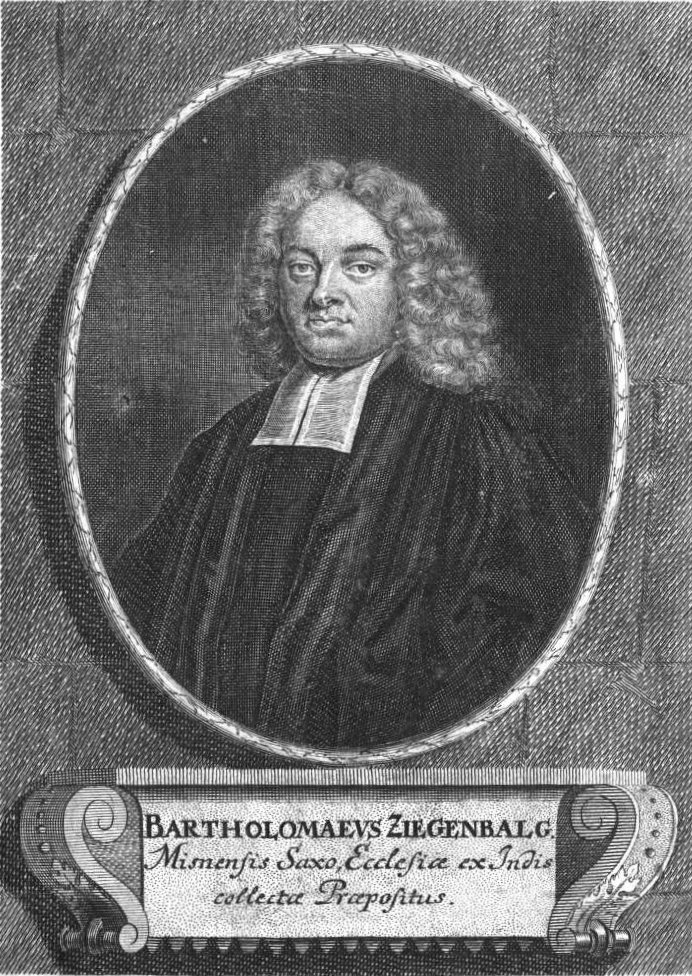
Bartholomäus Ziegenbalg (1682–1719)

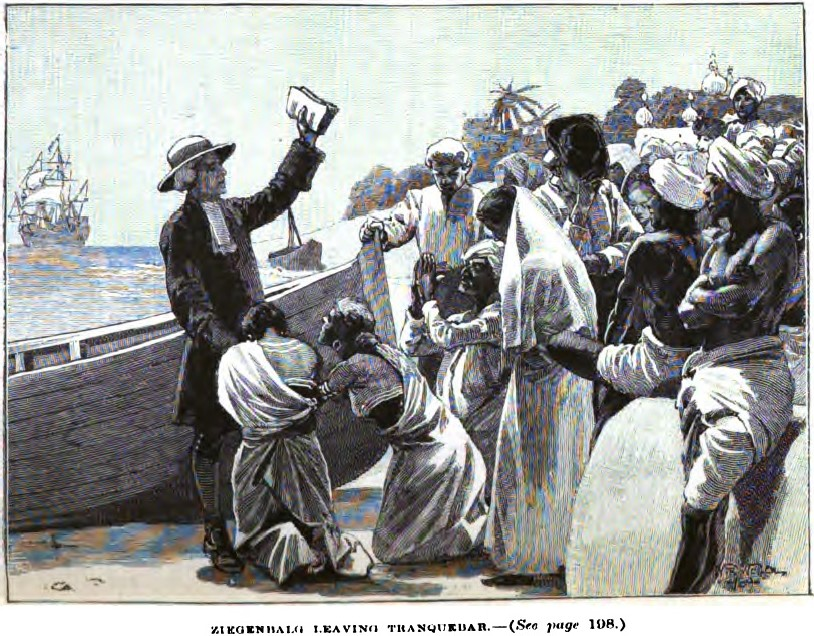
Ziegenbalg Leaving Tranquebar (p. 170, 1890), London Missionary Society

Bartholomäus Ziegenbalg was the first Protestant missionary to land in India, sent as a royal missionary by King Frederick IV, from the Kingdom of Denmark. Ziegenbalg landed at Tranquebar, then part of Danish India colony of the Danish East India Company, on 9 July 1707. Ziegenbalg attended the local school, sat amongst the village children, and learnt Tamil. He set up a Tamil seminary in 1707, and preached Christianity to the villagers. In 1711, he convinced the Martin Luther University at Halle to start scholarly study into the Tamil language.

In 1715, he translated the Bible into Tamil and helped set up India's first printing press at Tranquebar, with Tamil being the first Indian language to be printed. Ziegenbalg championed the cause of women's education and for abolition of caste system, and gained the respect of the local people. Ziegenbalg established the very first school for girls in India at Tranquebar in 1707. In 1713, in a letter written to Johann Georg von Holstein the privy counsellor to King Frederick IV, Ziegenbalg mentions 47 students in the Tamil school, 20 pupils in the Portuguese school, and 15 pupils in the Danish school, with the students of the Tamil and Portuguese schools being provided free tuitions, boarding, lodging and food. Between 1717 and 1718, he helped establish the New Jerusalem Church at Tranquebar for the use of the native people, conducting services in Tamil. Ziegenbalg died on 23 February 1719, aged 37, and is buried in the New Jerusalem Church.

== Church records ==
The church records of the New Jerusalem Church, Tranquebar from 1707 to 1888 are preserved at the Danish National Archives in Copenhagen. The records are initially in German, then in English during the British period.

== Architecture ==
The New Jerusalem Church at Tranquebar is built in the Danish architecture style, incorporating few Indian elements in the design. The church carries the royal monogram of Frederick IV of Denmark, with the year of consecration 1718 written below the monogram.

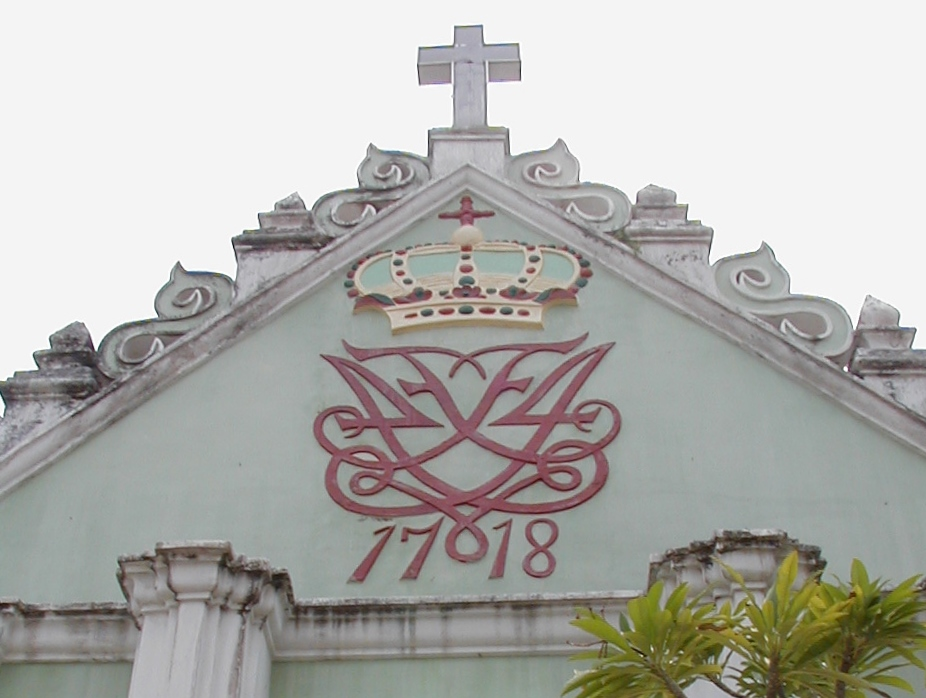
Royal Monogram of Frederick IV of Denmark, New Jerusalem Church, Tranquebar

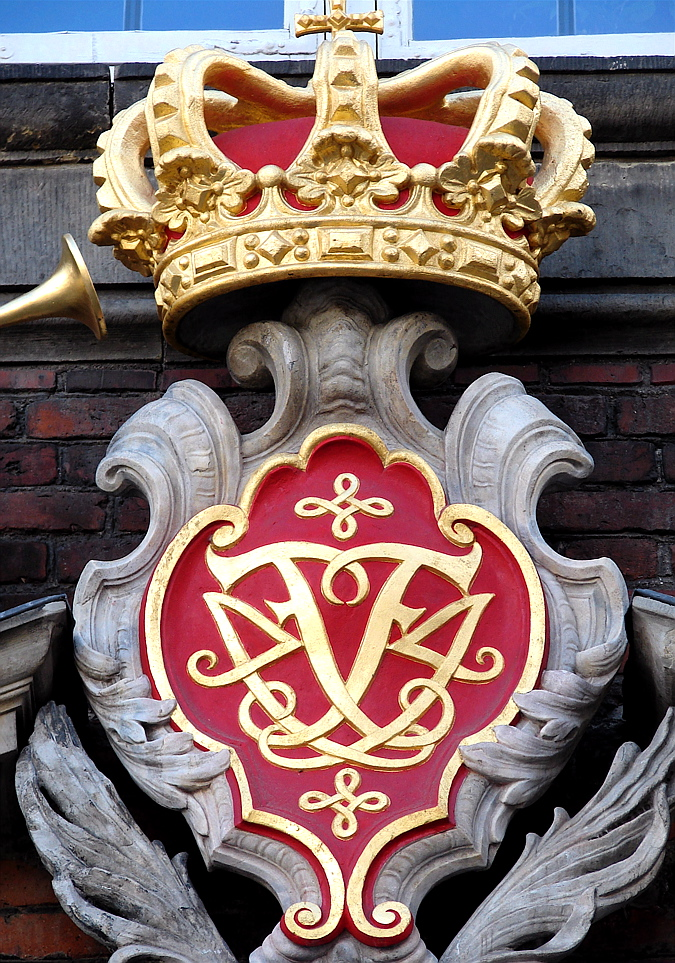
Royal Monogram of Frederick IV of Denmark

The church is built in the shape of a cross, with teak wood from the Jaffna Dutch Ceylon. The glass windows were worked on by artisans from Nagapattinam. The stones used in construction were quarried from the Vereenigde Oostindische Compagnie (VOC) colony of Sadras, 70 km south of Madras, and shipped by boats to Tranquebar. The windows are divided into two, the lower part made of wood and the upper part having glass. The roof of the church was strengthened using lime and mortar. The church had a pulpit and baptism font. However, due to lack of funds, the church did not have a church bell, organ, altar table or chandeliers.

The baptism font has a pictorial motif by Pastor Jonas Smit, depicting a Brahmin bathing in a river, emerging clean thereafter. The altar of the church is facing east, just like in Hindu temples, where the holiest place was in the east. The building has been studied by many Danish architects, and is found to incorporate both European and Indian features.

== Memorial stones ==
The church has many memorial stones within and outside the church building. There are inscriptions in English for Rt. Rev. Dr. Johannes Sandegren (20 November 1883 to 15 November 1962) Third Bishop of Tranquebar, Rev. J M N Schwarz (died 21 June 1887), A M Ruhde (died 1856), and Carl Christian V Gotting (16 June 1768 to 16 February 1858) Lt. Col. in the Danish Army. There are also inscriptions in Tamil, German and Danish.

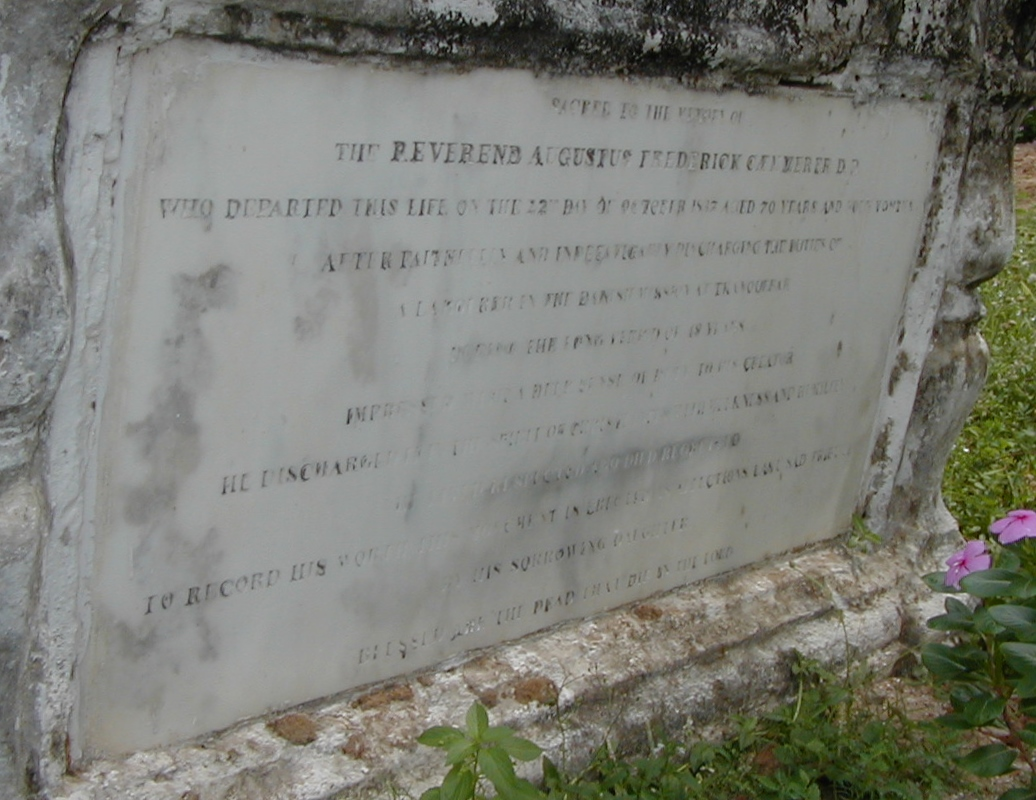
Rev. A F Cammerer

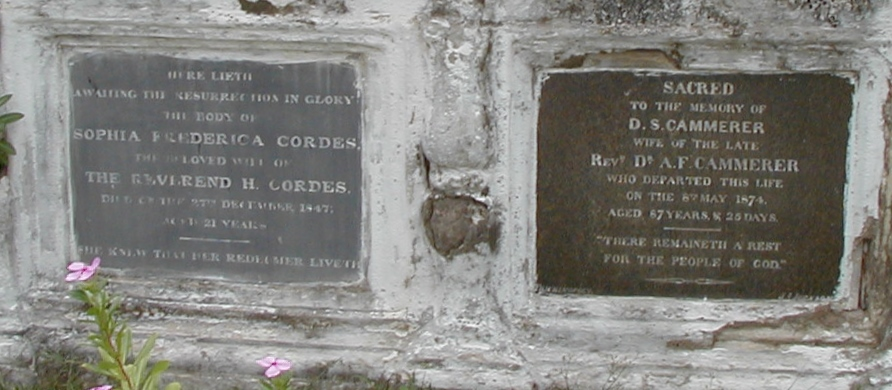
S F Cordes (1847) and D S Cammerer (1874)

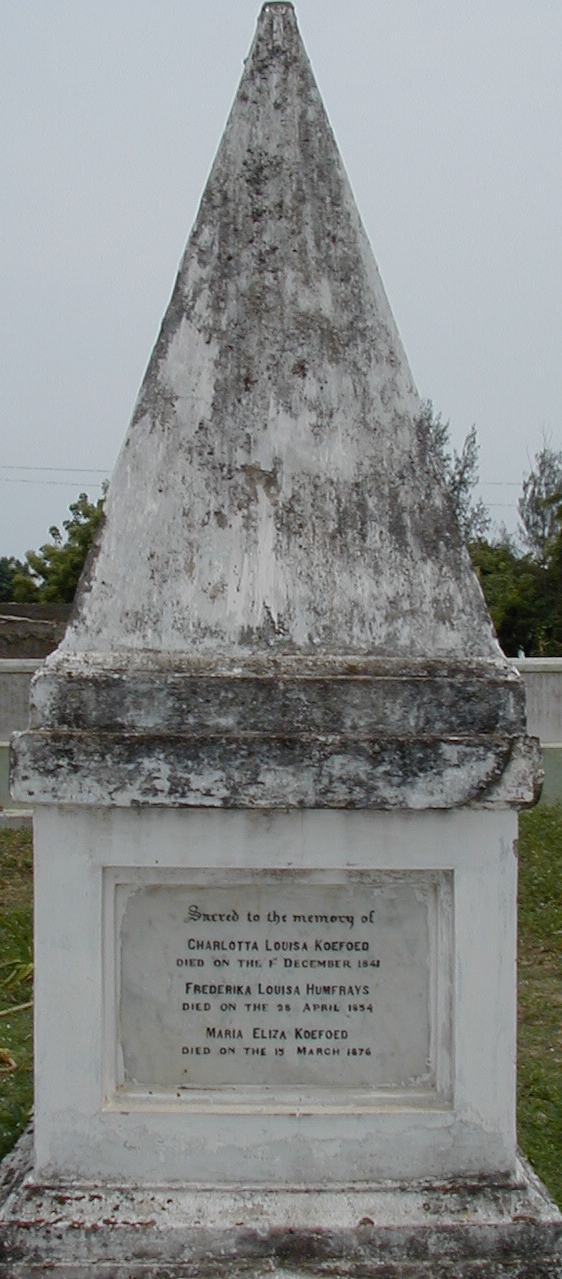
Koefoed
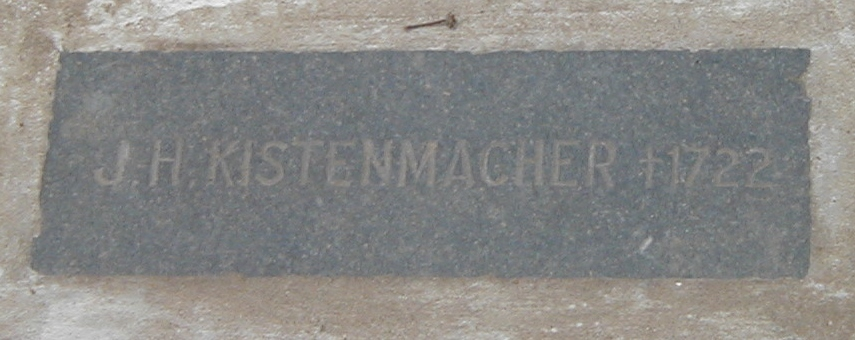
J H Kistenmacher (d. 1722)

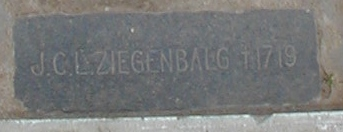
J C L Ziegenbalg (d. 1719)

== Re-consecration ==
The New Jerusalem Church at Tranquebar was re-consecrated by Rt. Rev. Margot Kassmann, Bishop of the Evangelical-Lutheran Church of Hanover, Germany on 9 July 2006, on the eve of the 300th anniversary of landing of Bartholomaeus Ziegenbalg on 9 July 1706, and establishment of the Tranquebar Mission. The event was organised by the Tamil Evangelical Lutheran Church (TELC), with many international delegates from USA, France, Germany, Denmark, Netherlands, etc. in attendance. The function was presided by Rt. Rev. T Aruldoss, Bishop of TELC, with Rt. Rev. Mark Hanson, President, Lutheran World Federation (LWF) giving thanks. The re-consecration was attended by nearly 10000 people.

To mark the occasion, a printing technology institute was inaugurated at the same place where Ziegenbalg started the first Tamil printing press. A souvenir detailing the services rendered by Ziegenbalg was also released. The local villagers of Tranquebar made a request for a memorial to be for Ziegenbalg on this occasion.

India Post also released a special stamp to mark the occasion, with a portrait of Ziegenbalg and the New Jerusalem Church in the background. The stamp was released in Madras, on 10 December 2006 by the then Union Minister Dayanidhi Maran.

== Dateline ==
- 1706, 9 July, Bartholomaeus Ziegenbalg and Heinrich Plütschau arrive at Tranquebar
- 1707, 14 June, Corner stone for first Lutheran Mission, Jerusalem Church laid
- 1707, 14 August, Jerusalem Church consecrated
- 1707, 5 September, First Tamil person baptised, first Tamil school started for natives
- 1716, 23 October, First seminary started by Ziegenbalg
- 1717, 9 February, Foundation laid for the New Jerusalem Church
- 1718, 11 October, New Jerusalem Church consecrated
- 1719, 23 February, Bartholomaeus Ziegenbalg dies aged 37, buried at the New Jerusalem Church
- 1720, 19 March, J E Grundler dies, buried at the New Jerusalem Church
- 1733, 28 December, Rev. Aaron, the first Tamil pastor, is ordained
- 1921, 8 March, Rt. Rev. Dr. Ernst Heuman ordained as first Bishop of Tranquebar
- 1928, 12 February, Rt. Rev. Dr. David Bexell ordained as second Bishop of Tranquebar
- 1934, 14 February, Rt. Rev. Dr. Johannes Sandegren ordained as third Bishop of Tranquebar
- 1956, 14 February, Rt. Rev. Dr. Rajah Bushanam Manikam ordained as fourth Bishop of Tranquebar
- 1967, 14 January, Rt. Rev. Dr. A Carl Gustav Diehl ordained as fifth Bishop of Tranquebar
- 1972, 14 January, Rt. Rev. A John Satyanadhan ordained as Sixth Bishop of Tranquebar
- 1975, 14 January, Rt. Rev. Lasarus Easter Raj ordained as Seventh Bishop of Tranquebar
- 1978, 14 January, Rt. Rev. Dr. Jayseelan Jacob ordained as Eighth Bishop of Tranquebar
- 1993, 14 January, Rt. Rev. Dr. Jubilee Gnanabaranam Johnson ordained as Ninth Bishop of Tranquebar
- 1999, 14 January, Rt. Rev. Dr. Thaveedu Aruldoss ordained as Tenth Bishop of Tranquebar
- 2006 8 July, Re-consecration of the renovated New Jerusalem Church by Rt. Rev. Margot Kassmann
- 2006 9 July, Celebration of 300 years of the Tranquebar Mission

== Gallery ==
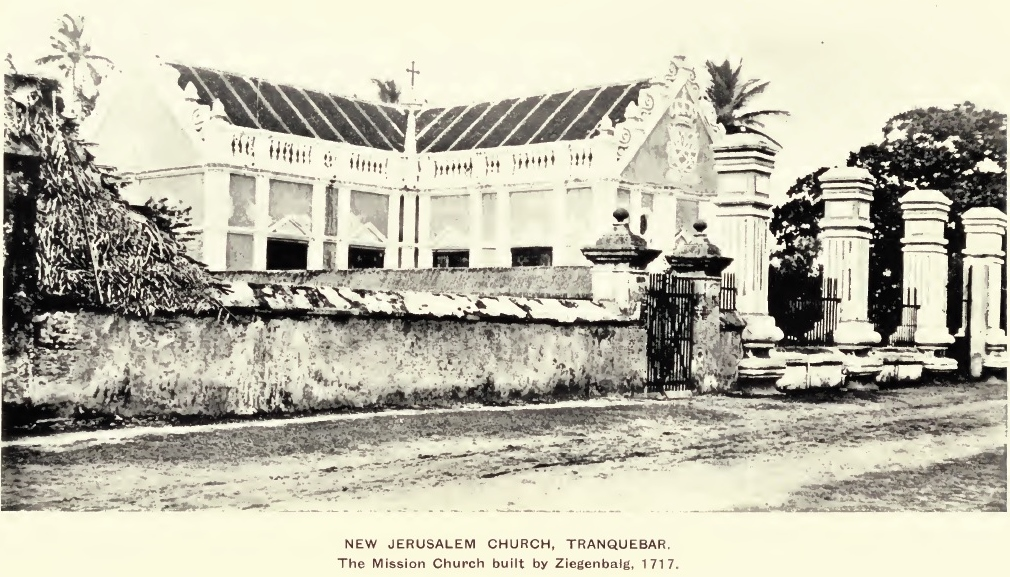
New Jerusalem Church, Tranquebar (1904) from Rev. Frank Penny's Book 'The Church in Madras - Vol. I'

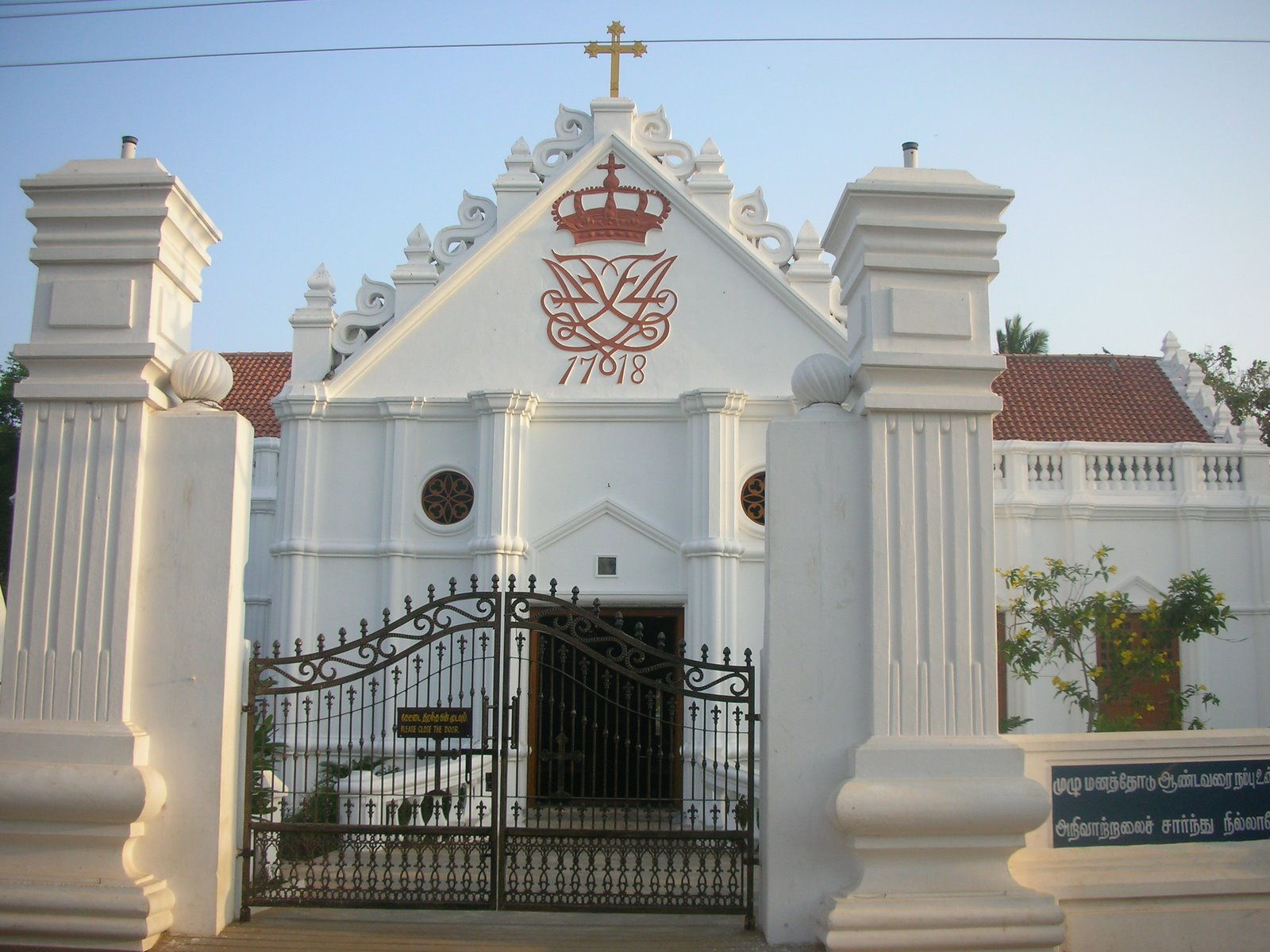
New Jerusalem Church, Tranquebar (2009)

== See also ==
- Danish East India Company
- Danish India
- Bartholomäus Ziegenbalg
- Tranquebar Mission
