= Johannes Sandegren =

Swedish Lutheran bishop

The Most Reverend Johannes Sandegren
- President of the TELC and Bishop of Tranquebar
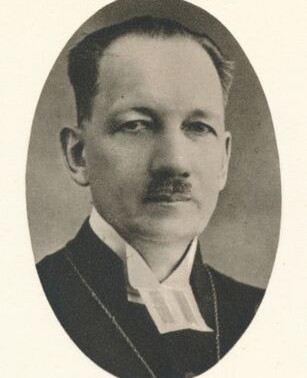
- Church: Tamil Evangelical Lutheran Church
- In office: 1934–1956
- Predecessor: David Bexell
- Successor: Rajah Bushanam Manikam

Orders
- Ordination: 16 December 1906 for the Diocese of Västerås
- Consecration: 14 January 1934 at the New Jerusalem Church, Tranquebar, India by David Bexell

Personal details
- Born: 20 November 1883
- Died: 15 November 1962 (aged 78)

Johannes Teodor Hjalmar Sandegren (20 November 1883, Madurai, India – 15 November 1962, Uppsala, Sweden) was a Swedish Lutheran bishop active in India.

Sandegren was born in South India as part of a large circle of siblings to a German–Swedish missionary family. His parents were Dr. Jacob Sandegren and Theodore Kremmer. His Swedish father had travelled to South India as a missionary, as early as 1869, and his parents met there. His mother was the daughter of a German missionary. Four of their sons became missionaries for the Church of Sweden in India. Johannes Sandegren was ordained in Västerås in 1906 and returned to India as a missionary in 1907. In 1915 he was back in Sweden, and became a licentiate in Sanskrit and religious history. In India, he was then active in Madurai. In 1927 he took the initiative to found TELC's theological college Gurukul, in Madras, where he became the director. In 1934 he became Bishop of Tranquebar in the Tamil Evangelical Lutheran Church (TELC), and emeritus in 1956. During his tenure in India, Sandegren has acted as co-consecrator in the ordination of bishops for the Church of India, Burma and Ceylon and the Mar Thoma Syrian Church. He made a significant contributions to strengthening and uniting the various Lutheran churches in India. With his efforts, the Federation of the Evangelical Lutheran Churches in India (FELCI) was set up in 1928, where he succeeded in linking church formations in India with missionary organizations from different countries. He produced a common hymnbook Cantica Evangelica in 1926 (several later editions), and a common liturgy. TELC had diaspora work in Malaysia and in 1952, Sandegren took the initiative for this to develop into an independent Lutheran church with its own bishop. Against this background, he was also actively involved in ecumenical activities in India and sought further church unions. In 1932 he was appointed Doctor of Theology honoris causa at the University of Rostock. Sandegren became a member of the Order of the Northern Star in 1934.

== See also ==
- Tranquebar Mission
- Tharangambadi
- Christianity in India
