= Bartholomäus Ziegenbalg =

German Lutheran clergy (1682–1719)

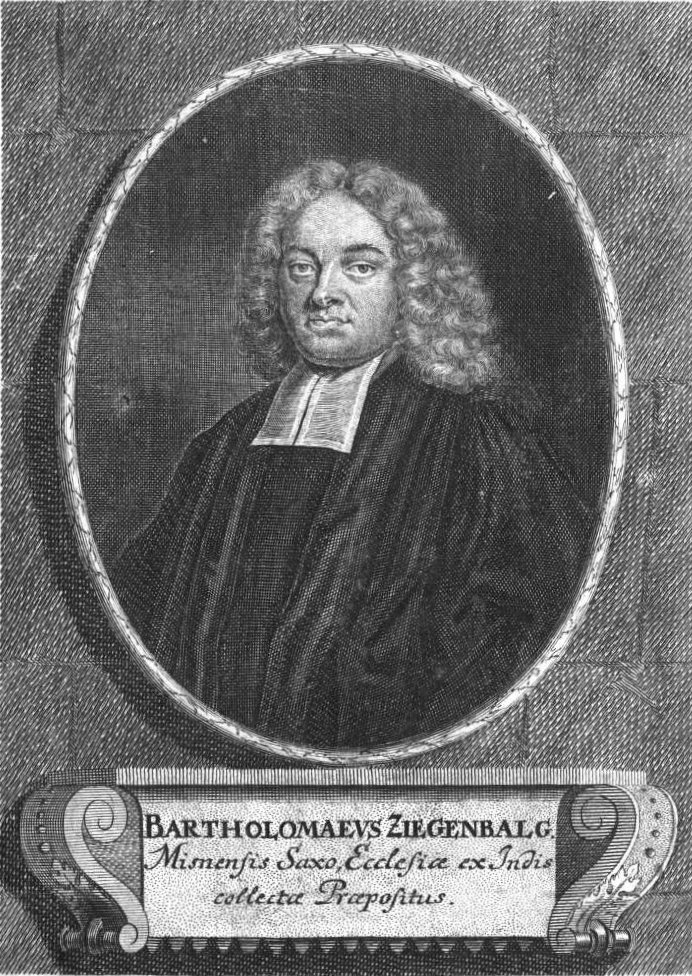
- Bartholomäus Ziegenbalg
- Born: 24 June 1683; Pulsnitz, Saxony, Holy Roman Empire
- Died: 23 February 1719 (aged 35); Tranquebar, Danish India, Denmark–Norway
- Spouse: Maria Dorothea Ziegenbalg (m. 1715)

Bartholomäus Ziegenbalg (Tamil: பர்த்தலோமேயு சீகன்பால்க்) (24 June 1683 – 23 February 1719) was a German Lutheran missionary and the first Pietist missionary to India. Sent under the patronage of Frederick IV of Denmark, he co-founded the Danish-Halle Mission in Tranquebar (present-day Tharangambadi, Tamil Nadu) with Heinrich Plütschau in 1706. Ziegenbalg is noted for producing the first complete translation of the New Testament into Tamil, for introducing the printing press to Protestant mission work in India, and for promoting Tamil literature and education.

== Early life ==
Ziegenbalg was born in Pulsnitz, Saxony, on 24 July 1683 in a devout Christian family. His father Bartholomäus Ziegenbalg Sr. (1640–1694), was a grain merchant, and his mother was Maria née Brückner (1646–1692). Through his father he was related to the sculptor Ernst Friedrich August Rietschel, and through his mother's side to the philosopher Johann Gottlieb Fichte. He showed an aptitude for music at an early age. He studied at the University of Halle under the teaching of August Hermann Francke, then the center of Pietistic Lutheranism. Under the patronage of King Frederick IV of Denmark, Ziegenbalg, along with his fellow student, Heinrich Plütschau, became the first Protestant missionaries to India. They arrived at the Danish colony of Tranquebar on 9 July 1706.

== Missionary work ==
A church of the Syrian tradition was probably born in South India as far back in history as the third century, at least. KP Kesava Menon, in his foreword to Christianity in India (Prakam, 1972), described a church typical of that tradition as "Hindu in culture, Christian in religion, and oriental in worship."

Bob Robinson laments the failure of the further forward moment of this potential dialogue between the two religions. He notes that even such supportive European missionary sympathisers of Hinduism as Roberto de Nobili and Ziegenbalg, despite their enthusiasm for this foreign faith, could never shake their conviction of the superiority of their own faith.

The propagation of the Gospel, despite Danish zeal, remained inchoate till the dawn of the eighteenth century. Frederick IV of Denmark, under the influence of August Hermann Francke (1663–1727), a professor of divinity in the University of Halle (in Saxony), proposed that one of the professor's eminently skilled and religiously enthusiastic pupils, Bartholomäus Ziegenbalg, be appointed to kindle in "the heathen at Tranquebar" the desired holy spark.

=== Tranquebar Mission ===
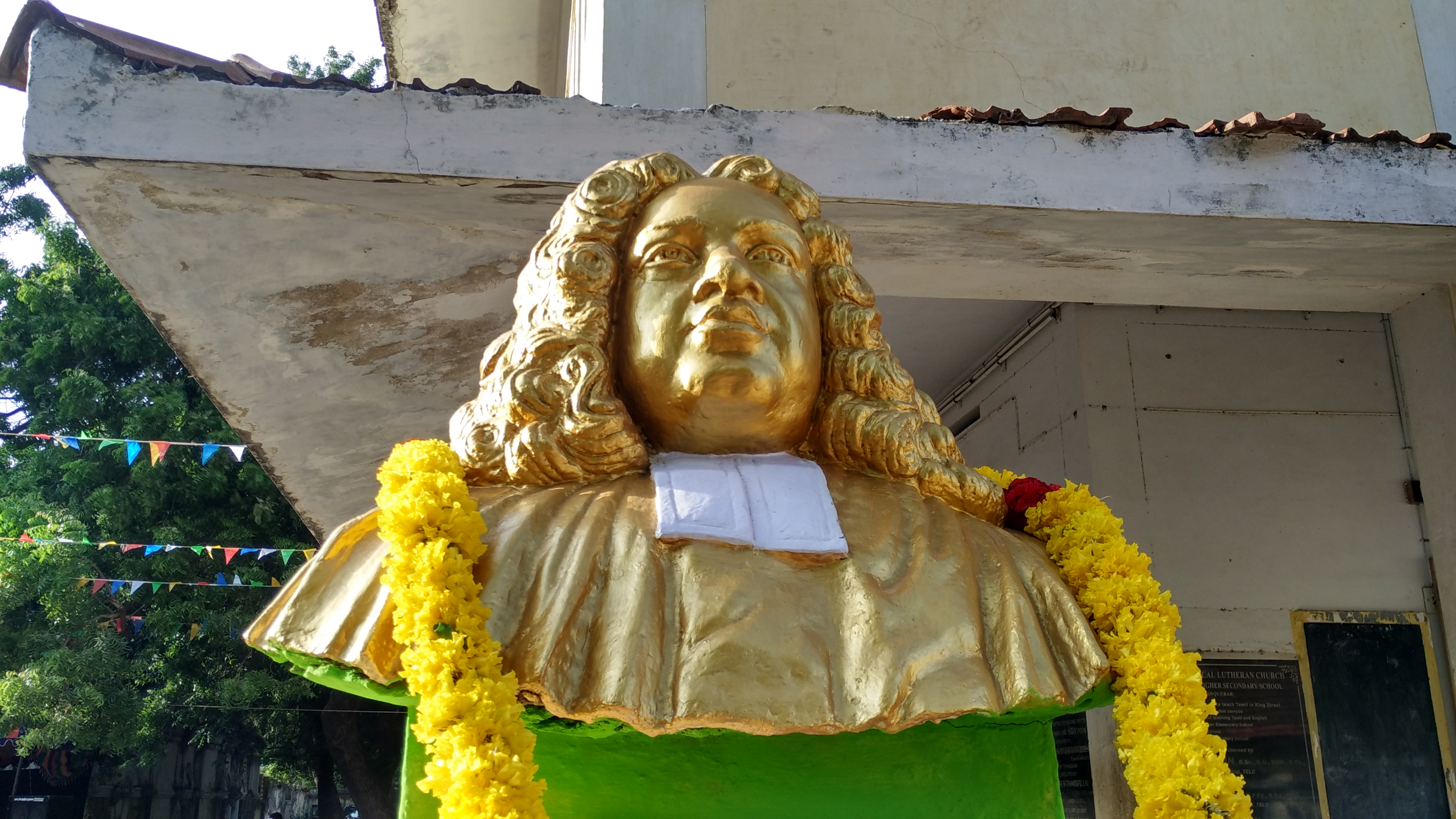
Statue of Bartholomäus Ziegenbalg at Tranquebar

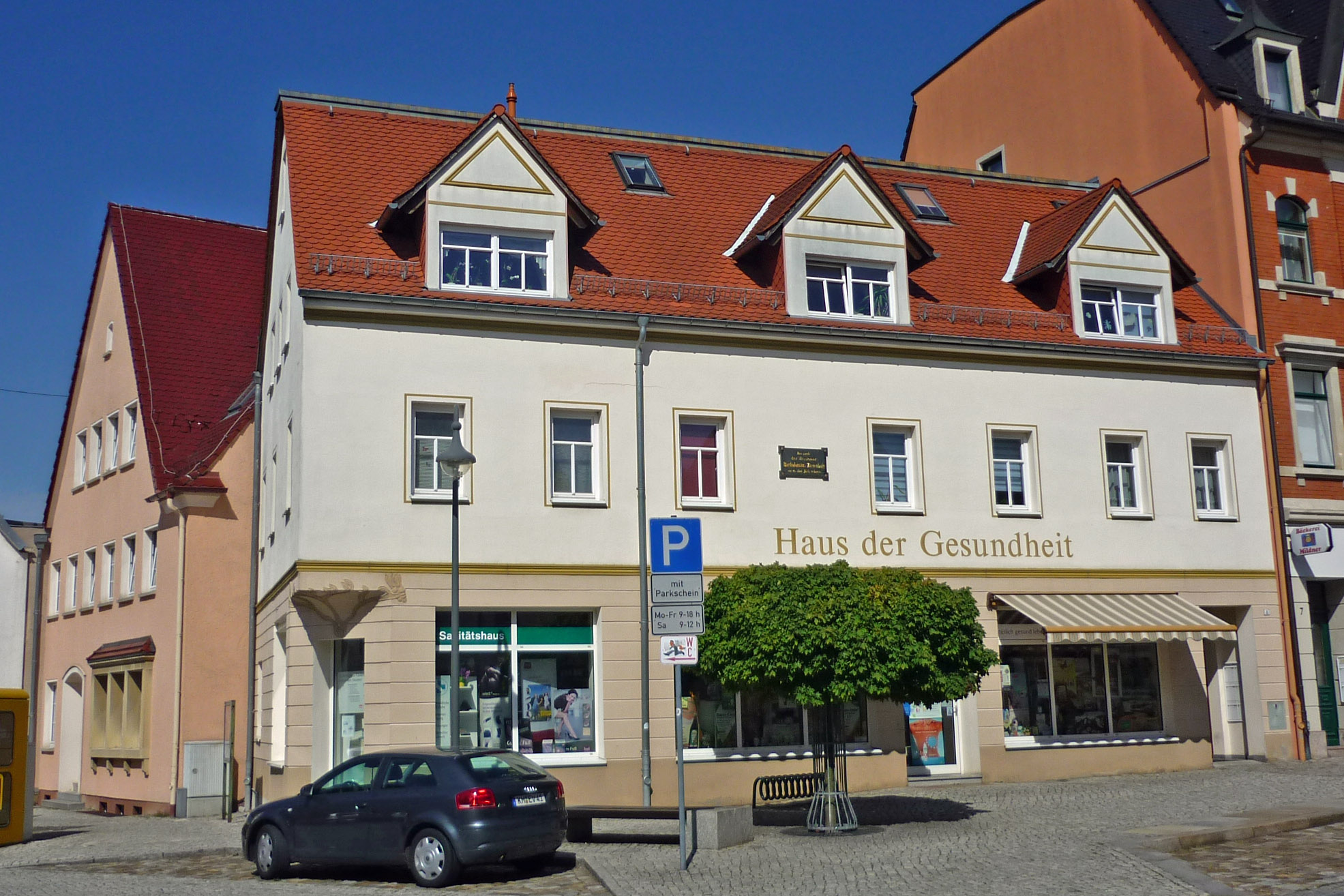
Pulsnitz, birthplace of Ziegenbalg (2013)

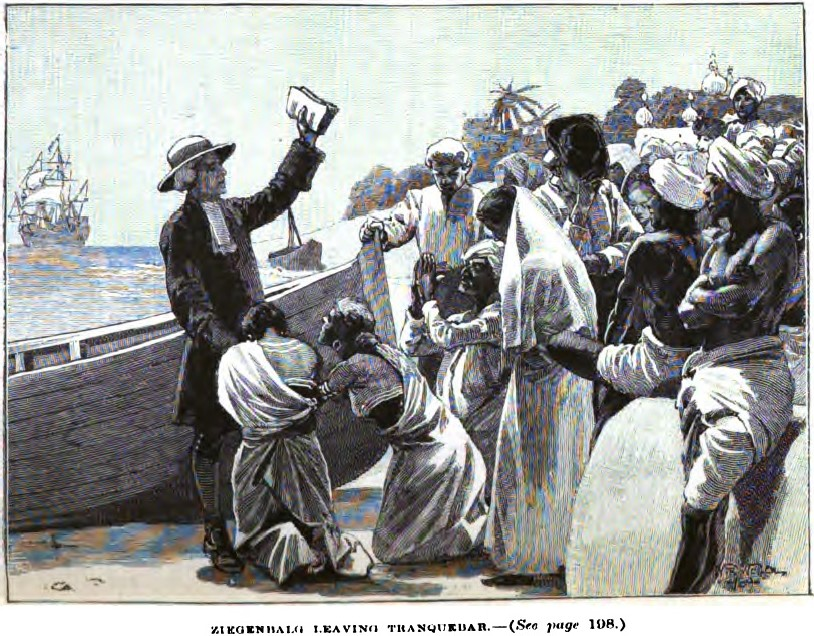
Ziegenbalg Leaving Tranquebar (p.170, 1890), London Missionary Society

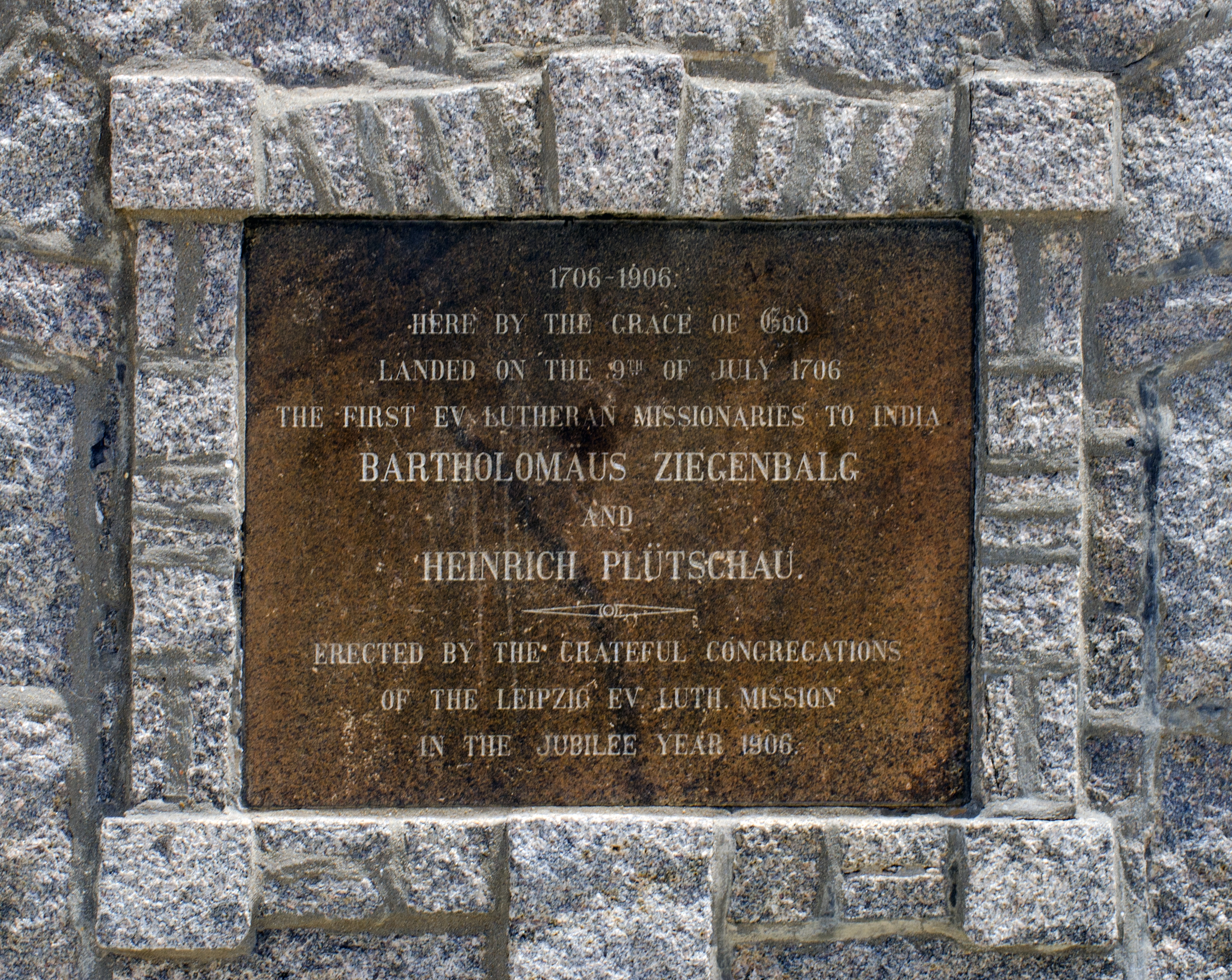
Ziegenbalg Landing Plaque, Tharangambadi (Tranquebar)

"Though the piety and zeal of Protestants had often excited an anxious desire to propagate the pure and reformed faith of the gospel in heathen countries, the establishment and defence against the Polish adversaries at home, together with the want of suitable opportunities and facilities for so great a work, combined during the first century after the Reformation, to prevent them from making any direct or vigorous efforts for this purpose."

Ziegenbalg brought Lutheranism and a printing-press to Tanjore court by ship. The Danes were in control of Tranqubar at that time. After an abortive excursion to Sri Lanka, where there was no room left to be conquered and seized, they made their way to Tranquebar circa 1620. Ove Gjedde who, in 1618, had commandeered the expedition to Lanka, initiated a treaty with the king of Tanjore to rent an area no more than "five miles by three in extent", resulting in the setting up of a fort, which still stands, though the Danes relinquished control of Tranquebar in 1845 to the British.

Printing and India found each other serendipitously. In 1556, a Portuguese ship bound for Abyssinia stopped in Goa to obtain provisions; the ship carried a printing press and 14 Jesuits, one of whom was João de Bustamante, the "Indian Gutenberg". The clergy in Goa hungered for the printing press far more vehemently than their counterparts in Abyssinia and, ultimately, the press was unloaded in Goa, and Bustamante stayed to set up the press at the College of St. Paul, a seminary that still exists.

The arrival of the first press in Goa was rejoiced at by St. Francis Xavier who had been preaching the gospel in Goa and in Tranquebar since 1542. Then inexplicably, and, significantly, all presses died out in India. Tamil printing seems to have stopped after 1612. Records show that the last books in Latin and Portuguese were printed in Goa in 1674.

Ziegenbalg responded to the King of Denmark's request for the bequest of a Christian mission to spread the vision of the Gospel in India, and in 1706, Ziegenbalg and his colleague Heinrich Plütschau reached the region of Tranquebar, thus becoming the first Protestant missionaries to arrive on the Indian sub-continent and began their revisionary project. After initial conflict with the East India Company, which even led to a four-month incarceration of Ziegenbalg, the two established the Danish-Halle Mission. They laboured intensively, despite opposition from the local Hindu and Danish authorities in Tranquebar, baptizing their first Indian converts on 12 May 1707.

Education has always been an integral component of missionary work. Ziegenbalg recognized from the start the imperative of learning the local languages in the progress of their mission. Stephen Neill notes this curious serendipity:

"The original plan was that Ziegenbalg should concentrate on Portuguese and Plütschau on Tamil. For no explicit reason, but to the great advantage of the work, this arrangement was changed, and mastery of Tamil became the primary objective of Ziegenbalg.

He had little to help him. No grammar was available. The Jesuits in the sixteenth century had printed a number of books in Tamil, but the work had been discontinued, and the Lutheran missionaries seem never even to have heard that such printed books existed."

Ziegenbalg possibly spent more time picking up the local tongue than in preaching incomprehensibly and in vain to a people who would then have thought him quite remarkable. He went on to write, in 1709: "I choose such books as I should wish to imitate both in speaking and writing ... Their tongue ...(now) is as easy to me as my mother tongue, and in the last two years I have been able to write several books in Tamil..."

Ziegenbalg was publicly critical of some members of the Brahmin caste, accusing them of disregard for lower castes in Hindu society. For that reason, at least one group plotted to kill him. This reaction by native Indians was unusual and Ziegenbalg's work did not generally encounter unfriendly crowds; his lectures and classes drawing considerable interest from locals.

In 1708, a dispute over whether the illegitimate child of a Danish soldier and a non-Christian woman should be baptized and brought up as a Roman Catholic or a Protestant, resulted in Heinrich Plütschau being brought before a court. Although Plütschau was released, Ziegenbalg wrote that "the Catholics rejoiced, that we were persecuted and they were authorized."

He connected this incident, which he took to have emboldened the Catholics, directly with a second nearly two weeks later, which resulted in his imprisonment. This incident arose from Ziegenbalg's intervention on behalf of the widow of a Tamil barber over a debt between her late husband and a Catholic who was employed by the company as a translator. The commander of the Danish fort in Tranquebar, Hassius, regarded Ziegenbalg's repeated intervention in the case, including his advice that the widow kneel before him in the Danish church, as inappropriate and sent for Ziegenbalg to appear before him. When Ziegenbalg demurred, requesting a written summons, he was arrested and, because he refused to answer questions, imprisoned.

Although released after a little more than four months, Ziegenbalg still had a difficult relationship with Hassius and that was one reason for Ziegenbalg's return to Europe in 1714–1716. Ziegenbalg was also married in 1716. He was active in cooperation with the Anglican Society for the Propagation of Christian Knowledge, making his work one of the first ecumenical ventures in the history of Protestant missionary work.

Stephen Neill suggests, "As a missionary of the Danish crown, ordained in Denmark, Ziegenbalg felt himself bound by the liturgy and customs of the Danish church (…) Only in one respect does [he] seem to have made a concession to the fact that this new church was growing up in India; he made use of the presence in the Christian community of a measure of literary and musical talent to introduce the singing of Tamil lyrics to Indian melodies, in addition to using in church the growing collection of hymns which had been translated from German, but in which the original metres and tunes had been preserved."

== Literary work ==
=== Translations ===
The 16th century saw the rise of Protestantism and an explosion of translations of the New (and Old) Testament into the vernacular. After all this time spent in blood-wrenching and sweat-drenching scholarship, Ziegenbalg wrote numerous texts in Tamil, for dissemination among Hindus. He was fully conscious of the importance of print in the history of the Protestant Church.

He commenced his undertaking of translating the New Testament in 1708 and completed it in 1711, though printing was delayed till 1714, because of Ziegenbalg's insistent, perfectionist revisions. Stephen Neill comments, "Only rarely has the first translation of Scripture in a new language been found acceptable. Ziegenbalg’s achievement was considerable; for the first time the entire New Testament had been made available in an Indian language. But from the start, Ziegenbalg’s work was exposed to criticism on a variety of grounds" and that Johann Fabricius’ update on the pioneering text was so clearly superior, "before long the older version ceased to be used."

It was obvious to Ziegenbalg that without a printing press all his effort would come to nought. Possibly as early as 1709, he requested a printing press from Denmark. The Danes forwarded the appeal to London to the Society for Promoting Christian Knowledge. The SPCK, not allowed a foothold in India by the East India Company's merchants, was only too eager to help and in 1712 shipped out to the Tranquebar Mission a printing press with type, paper, ink, and a printer. Ziegenbalg was also hindered by delays in the construction of a suitable Tamil typeface for his purposes.

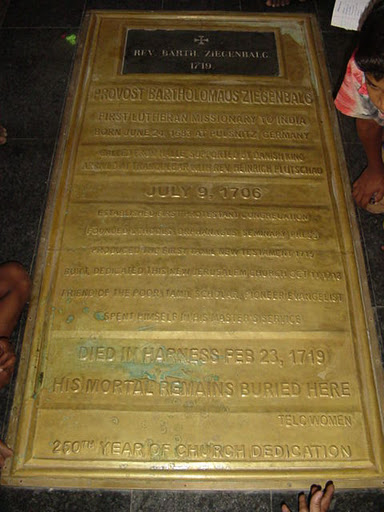
Tomb of Bartholomäus Ziegenbalg

In a letter dated 7/4/1713 to George Lewis, the Anglican chaplain at Madras, and first printed in Portuguese, on the press the mission had recently received from the Society, for Promoting Christian Knowledge, Ziegenbalg writes: "We may remember on this Occasion, how much the Art of Printing contributed to the Manifestation of divine Truths, and the spreading of Books for that End, at the Time of the happy Reformation, which we read of in History, with Thanksgiving to Almighty God."

Following this, he began translating the Old Testament, building "himself a little house in a quiet area away from the centre of the town, where he could pursue tranquilly what he regarded as the most important work of all. On 28 September 1714, he reports to Francke that the book Exodus has now been completed. At the time of his death, he had continued the work up to the Book of Ruth."

=== Other works ===
Ziegenbalg compiled the Tamil-language Bhakti poetry, aiming to promote a better understanding of the natives among the Europeans. However, when he sent these volumes to Halle for publication, his mentor wrote that the duty of the missionaries was "to extirpate heathenism, and not to spread heathenish nonsense in Europe".

S. Muthiah in his fond remembrance ("The Legacy that Ziegenbalg left") ends with an inventory of the man's lesser-known works: "Apart from the numerous Tamil translations of Christian publications he made, he wrote several books and booklets that could be described as being Indological in nature. He also had the press printing educational material of a more general nature. As early as 1708, he had compiled his Bibliothece Malabarke, listing the 161 Tamil books he had read and describing their content. In 1713, in Biblia Tamulica he expanded this bibliography. Also in 1713, the press produced what was perhaps the first Almanac to be printed in India. Then, in 1716, there appeared what was probably the first book printed in Asia in English, A Guide to the English Tongue, by Thomas Dyche.

The next year, the press printed an A.B.C. (in Portuguese) for schools in the English territories. What did not get printed in Tranquebar were Ziegenbalg's Indological writings. In fact, his works like Nidiwunpa (Moral Quartrains), Kondei Wenden (a Tamil ethics text), Ulaga Nidi (World Moral, Tamil), and his books on Hinduism and Islam were printed only 150-250 years later in Europe and Madras."

== Death and legacy ==
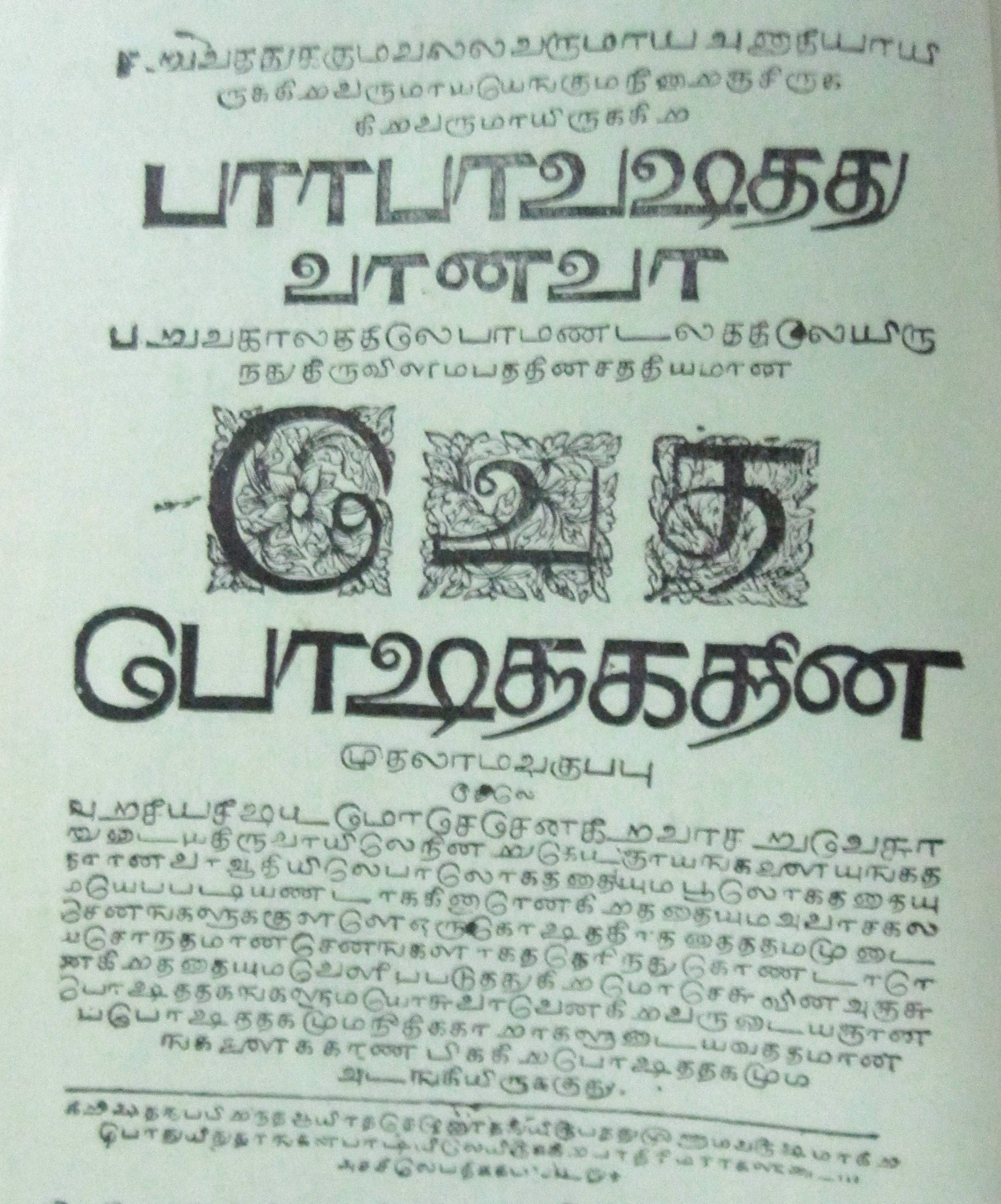
A page from the Tamil New Testament published by Ziegenbalg

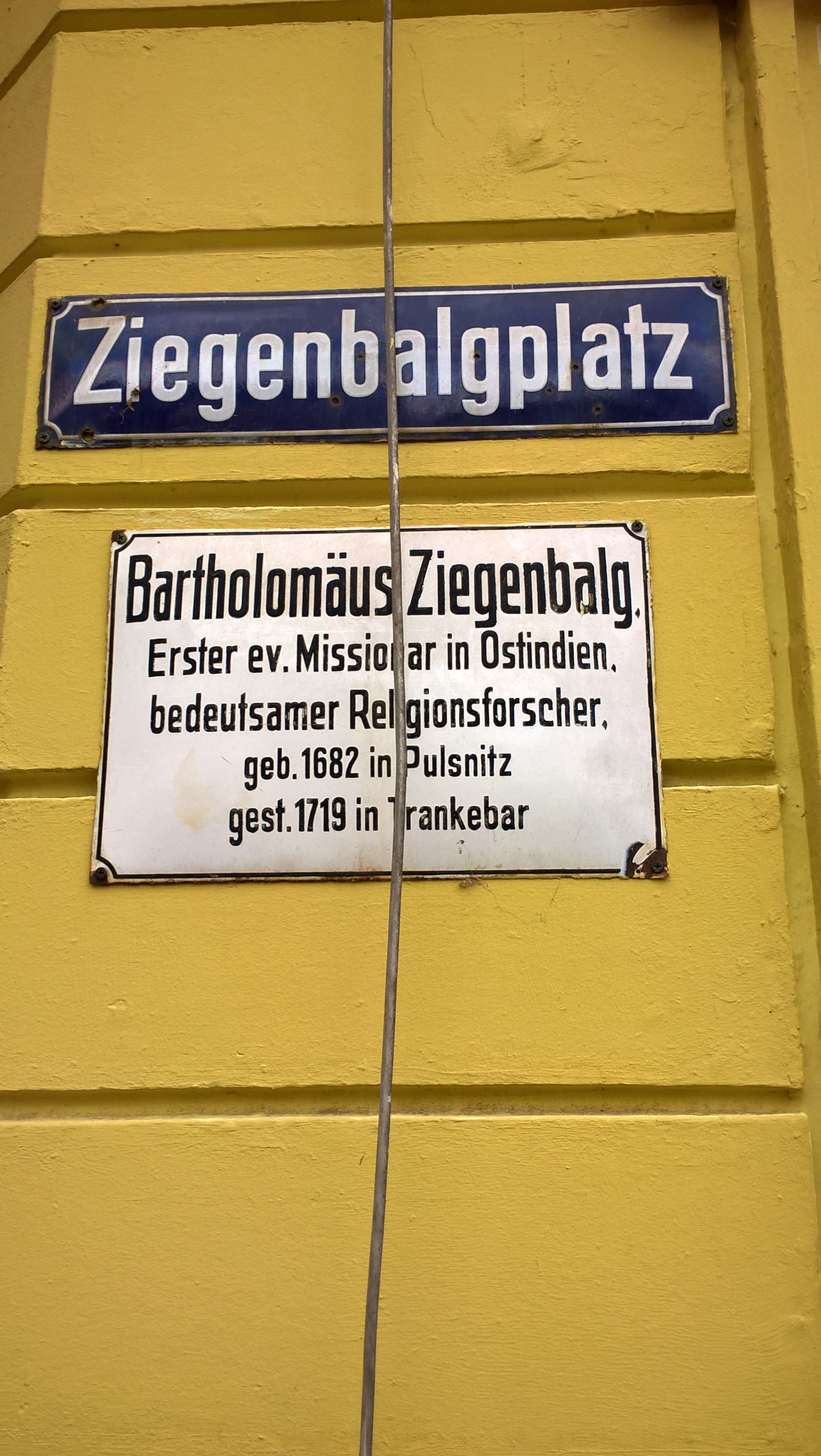
"Ziegenbalgplatz" - Road sign in Pulsnitz

Ziegenbalg was troubled by ill health his entire life, a condition aggravated by his work in the mission field. He died on 23 February 1719, at the age of thirty-six, in Tranquebar. His last 13 years were spent laying the foundations for German scholarship in Tamil that continues to this day. Ziegenbalg is buried at the New Jerusalem Church, which he helped establish in 1718 at Tranquebar.

The positive results of their labours came with challenges. Their work was opposed both by Hindus and by the local Danish authorities. In 1707/08, Ziegenbalg spent four months in prison on a charge that by converting the natives, he was encouraging rebellion. Along with the political opposition, he had to cope with the climatic conditions in India. Ziegenbalg wrote: "My skin was like a red cloth. The heat here is very great, especially during April, May and June, in which season the wind blows from the inland so strongly that it seems as if the heat comes straight out of the oven".

For an account of his death, see Death-bed scenes: or, Dying with and without religion, designed to illustrate the truth and power of Christianity, Volume 43; Volume 651, Part I, Section II, chapter 28.

Johann Phillip Fabricius picked up where Ziegenbalg left off in Bible translation, particularly Tamil Christian hymnody. He also felt that the previous translation by Ziegenbalg urgently needed emendations. "The four qualities which Fabricius found in the originals were lucidity, strength, brevity and appropriateness; these were sadly lacking in the existing Tamil translation, but he hoped that by the help of God he had been able to restore them." Both scholars can also be referred to as proto-linguists, both worked arduously on dictionaries and grammars in Tamil. Interesting semiotic and linguistic questions arise, when taking into consideration both gentlemen's translations of the Bible.

Stephen Neill summarises Ziegenbalg's failures and the cause of tragedy in his life, thus: "He was little too pleased with his position as a royal missionary, and too readily inclined to call on the help of the civil power in Denmark. In his controversies with the authorities at Tranquebar, he was generally in the right, but a less impetuous and more temperate approach might in the end have been more beneficial to the mission. He was too ready to open the coffers of the mission to those who claimed to be needy Christians, though he was right that those who had lost all their property through becoming Christians could not be allowed to starve".

== Honors ==
In Pulsnitz, the “Ziegenbalgplatz” was named after Bartholomäus Ziegenbalg.

== Bibliography ==
- Bartholomäus Ziegenbalg: Merckwürdige Nachricht aus Ost-Indien ... Leipzig / Frankfurt am Main 1708.
- Tranquebar Bible, 1714 (first bible in Tamil).
- Excerpts from writings of Ziegenbalg: Werner Raupp (Hrsg.): Mission in Quellentexten. Geschichte der Deutschen Evangelischen Mission von der Reformation bis zur Weltmissionskonferenz Edinburgh 1910, Erlangen/Bad Liebenzell 1990, p. 138–163 (incl. introd. and lit.), esp. p. 141–154.

== See also ==
- Calendar of Saints (Lutheran)
- Missionaries
- Lutheranism
