= Tranquebar Mission =

- Trankebarmissionen
- Successor: Tamil Evangelical Lutheran Church
- Formation: 1706
- Founder: Bartholomaeus Ziegenbalg and Heinrich Plütschau
- Founded at: Tranquebar, Danish India
- Headquarters: Trichinopoly, India
- Official language: Tamil

The Tranquebar Mission (Danish: Trankebarmissionen; Tamil: தரங்கம்பாடி பணி) was established in 1706 by two German missionaries from Halle namely, Bartholomäus Ziegenbalg and Heinrich Plütschau. Ziegenbalg and Plütschau responded to the appeal of King Frederick IV of Denmark to establish a mission for the natives, living in the Danish East India Company colony of Tranquebar. The mission was responsible for the printing and publication of the Bible in the Tamil language. In 2006, the 300 years anniversary of the mission was celebrated by the Tamil Evangelical Lutheran Church (TELC), with many international delegates in attendance. A monument to acknowledge 300 years of the mission was raised by the TELC on this occasion.

== History ==
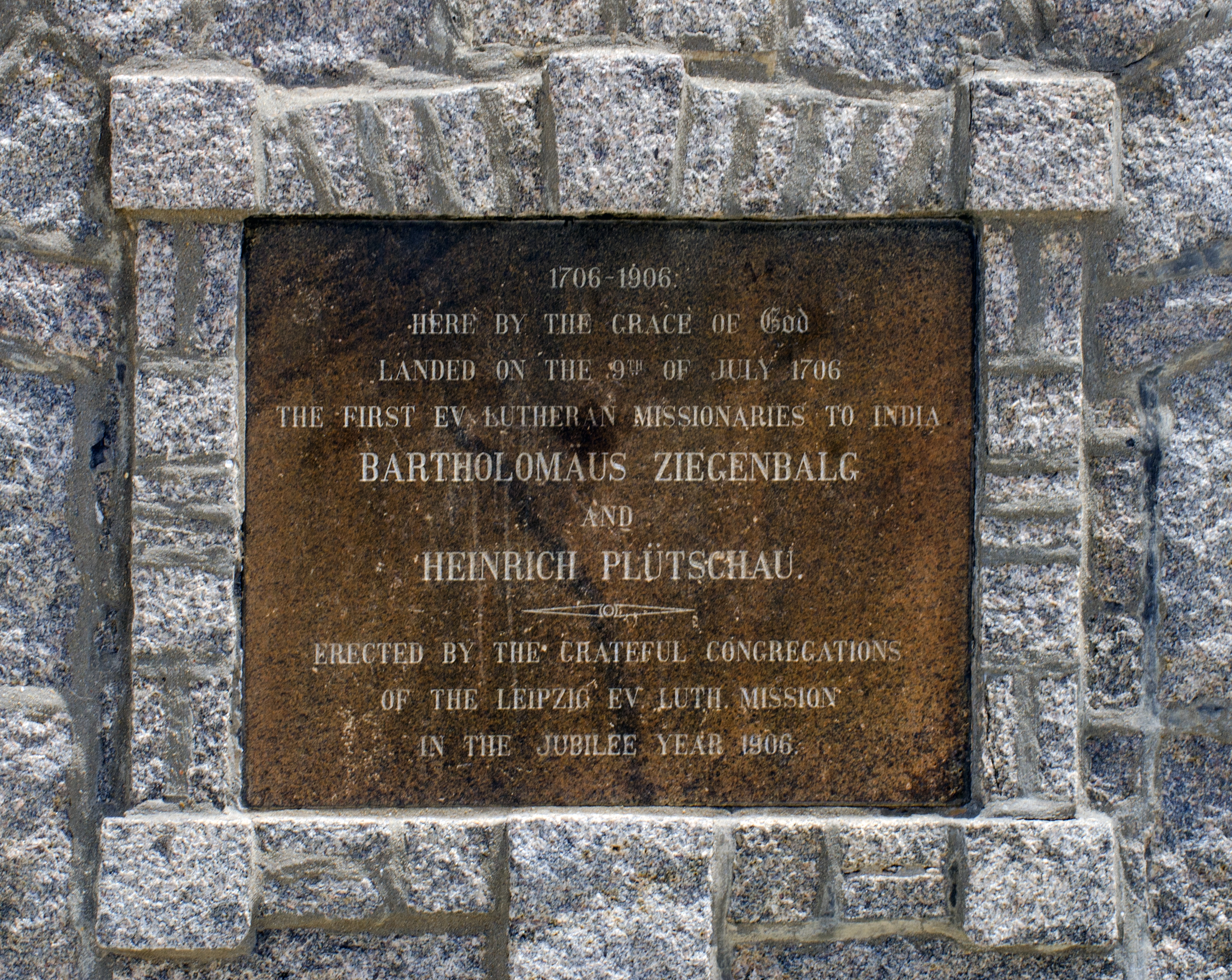
Ziegenbalg Landing Plaque, Tharangambadi (Tranquebar)

In 1620, the village of Tranquebar was acquired for the Danish Crown, by the Danish Admiral Ove Gjedde, by signing an agreement with the Raghunatha Nayak of the Tanjore Nayak Kingdom on behalf of the King of Denmark.

King Frederick IV of Denmark was very keen to spread Christianity among his non-European subjects and called from Royal missionaries. However, there was a lack of interest to his call among his Danish subjects. Hence, the king gave the task of finding the right people to his court chaplain Franz J Lütkens. After a search in German universities, Bartholomäus Ziegenbalg and Heinrich Plütschau were selected. After being ordained in Copenhagen, they sailed to Tranquebar with a royal charter on the ship Sophia Hedewig on 29 November 1705, arriving on 9 July 1706.

At this point around 15,000 people lived in Tranquebar and its surroundings, with the population consisting of Hindus, Muslims, Indian Catholics, as well as Europeans working for the East India Company. After initial conflicts with the Danish East India Company, which even lead to a four month incarceration of Ziegenbalg, he established the Tranquebar Mission in 1706. They baptised their first convert after 10 months of establishing the mission. The mission faced opposition from the authorities of Danish settlement, in spite of the royal charter, as it was felt that by encouraging conversion, Ziegenbalg was encouraging dis-order and rebellion at Tranquebar. Under Ziegenbalg, the mission set up the very first Tamil press in India at Tranquebar, and set about the task of translating the Bible into Tamil. In 1716, a seminary for training native clergy was established by the mission. When Ziegenbalg died in 1719, he had finished translating the New Testament and chapters Genesis to Ruth of the Old Testament, and the mission had 2 church buildings, a seminary and a native congregation of 250 people.

Another notable missionary was Christian Friedrich Schwarz (born 1726), who served the Tranquebar Mission for 48 years.

== Bartholomaeus Ziegenbalg ==
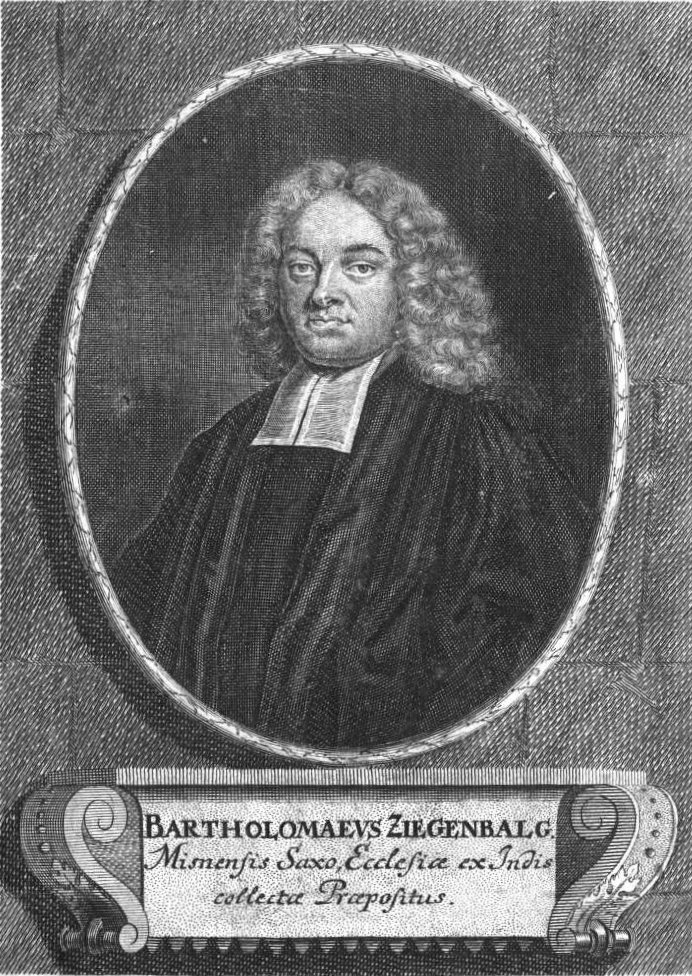
Bartholomäus Ziegenbalg (1682-1719)

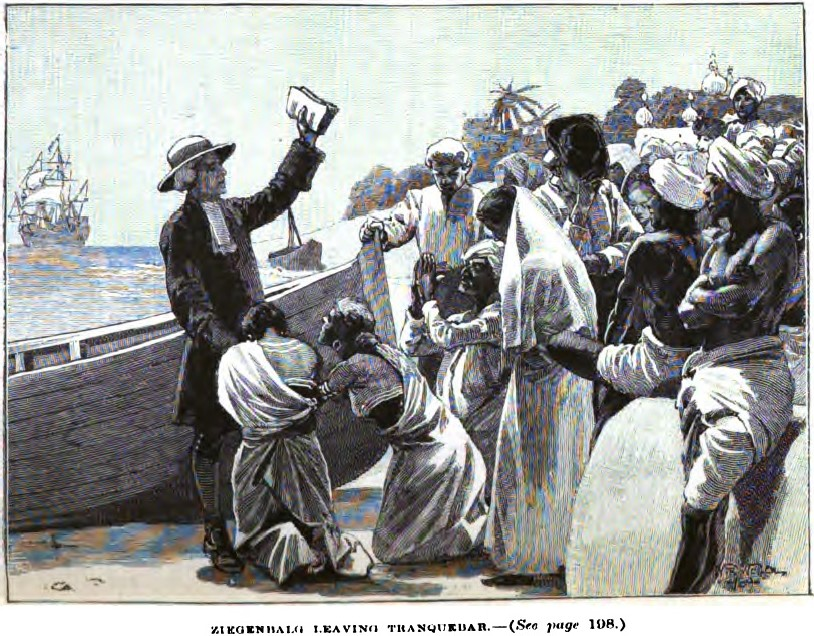
Ziegenbalg Leaving Tranquebar (p.170, 1890), London Missionary Society

Bartholomaeus Ziegenbalg was the first Protestant missionary to land in India, sent as a Royal Missionary by King Frederick IV, from the Kingdom of Denmark. Ziegenbalg landed at Tranquebar, then part of Danish India colony of the Danish East India Company, on 9 July 1706. Ziegenbalg attended the local school, sat amongst the village children and learnt Tamil. He set up a Tamil seminary in 1707, and preached Christianity to the villagers. In 1711, he was able to convince the University of Halle at Halle to start scholarly study into the Tamil language.

In 1715, he translated the Bible into Tamil and helped set up India's first printing press at Tranquebar, with Tamil being the first Indian language to be printed. Ziegenbalg championed the cause of women's education and abolition of caste system, and gained the respect of the local people. Ziegenbalg established the very first school for girls (all-girl school) in India at Tranquebar in 1707. In 1713, in a letter written to Johann Georg von Holstein the privy counsellor to King Frederick IV, Ziegenbalg mentions 47 students in the Tamil school, 20 pupils in the Portuguese school and 15 pupils in the Danish school, with the students of the Tamil and Portuguese schools being provided free tuition, boarding, lodging and food. Between 1717–1718, he helped establish the New Jerusalem Church at Tranquebar for the use of the native people, conducting services in Tamil. Ziegenbalg died on 23 February 1719, aged 37, and is buried in the New Jerusalem Church.

== New Jerusalem Church ==
The New Jerusalem Church was established by the Tranquebar Mission, built in 1718 by the Royal Danish missionary Bartholomaeus Ziegenbalg in the coastal town of Tranquebar, India which was at that time a Danish India Colony. The church is located on King Street, and church services are conducted every Sunday. The church, along with other buildings of the Tranquebar Mission was damaged during the tsunami of 2004, and were renovated at a cost of INR 7 million, and re-consecrated in 2006.

== Tamil Evangelical Lutheran Church ==
On 14 January 1919, the Tamil congregation of different German, Danish and Swedish Lutheran missions, joined together to form the Tamil Evangelical Lutheran Church (TELC). In March 1921, the constitution of the TELC was amended to include the structure of episcopacy. In 1921, a Swedish missionary Rev. Dr. Ernst Heuman, was ordained as the first bishop of the TELC. The bishop of TELC holds the title Bishop of Tranquebar. In 1956, Dr. Rajah Bushanam became the first Indian to be ordained as the bishop of TELC.

== 300 Years Celebration ==
To mark the 300th anniversary of the establishment of the Tranquebar Mission, the New Jerusalem Church at Tranquebar was re-consecrated by Rt. Rev. Margot Käßmann, Bishop of the Evangelical-Lutheran Church of Hanover, Germany on 9 July 2006. The event was organised by the Tamil Evangelical Lutheran Church (TELC), with many international delegates from USA, France, Germany, Denmark, Netherlands, etc. in attendance. The function was presided by Rt. Rev. T Aruldoss, Bishop of TELC, with Rt. Rev. Mark Hanson, President, Lutheran World Federation (LWF) giving thanks. The re-consecration was attended by nearly 10000 people.

To mark the occasion, a printing technology institute was inaugurated at the same place where Ziegenbalg started the first Tamil printing press. A souvenir detailing the services rendered by Ziegenbalg was also released. The local villagers of Tranquebar made a request for a memorial to be for Ziegenbalg on this occasion.

India Post also released a special stamp to mark the occasion, with a portrait of Ziegenbalg and the New Jerusalem Church in the background. The stamp was released in Madras, on 10 December 2006 by the then Union Minister Dayanidhi Maran.

== Sources ==
- Excerpts from the history of the Tranquebar Mission, in: Werner Raupp (Ed.): Mission in Quellentexten. Geschichte der Deutschen Evangelischen Mission von der Reformation bis zur Weltmissionskonferenz Edinburgh 1910, Erlangen/Bad Liebenzell 1990, p. 138–163 (1. August Hermann Francke; 2. Bartholomäus Ziegenbalg; 3. Es begann in Tranquebar; incl. introd. and lit.)
