= Thomas Dyche =

English schoolmaster and lexicographer

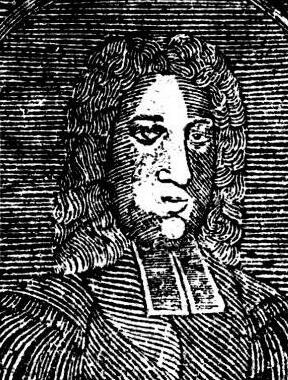
- Portrait in A guide to the English Tongue
- Born: before 1695 prob. Ashbourne, Derbyshire
- Died: c. 1733
- Occupation(s): Schoolmaster and Lexicographer
- Children: at least 1

Reverend Thomas Dyche (died c. 1733) was an English schoolmaster and lexicographer (probably) from Ashbourne, Derbyshire. He published a number of books on the English language including one thought to be the first English book published in Asia. He is remembered for his reference books and his contribution to pronunciation. Dyche's New General English Dictionary was in print from 1735 to 1798 and went through eighteen editions.

== Biography ==
Dyche was educated at Ashbourne free school, Derbyshire, under the Rev. William Hardestee (dedication of Vocabularium Latiale, 5th edition). He subsequently took orders, and moved to London. In 1708 he was keeping school in Dean Street, Fetter Lane, but some time after 1710 he obtained, the mastership of the free school at Stratford Bow.

In 1716, Dyche's book A Guide to the English Tongue was being published by the linguist Bartholomaeus Ziegenbalg in Tharangambadi. This is believed to be the first book published in English in Asia.

In 1719 he rashly attempted to expose in print the peculations of the notorious John Ward of Hackney in discharge of his [Ward's] trust about repairing Dagnam Breach. Thereupon Ward sued Dyche for libel, and at the trial, 18 June 1719, was awarded sizeable damages.

Dyche seems to have died between 1731 and 1735. Dyche's New General English Dictionary was in print from 1735 to 1798 and went through eighteen editions. His work identified as "conspicuous" was A Guide to the English Tongue, which was in print from its first publication in 1709 through a 48th edition in 1780 and a final print in 1830. This work differed from other similar works in that it emphasized pronunciation. Within the book words were sorted into groups where words with two syllables were further sub-divided into those that emphasized the first syllable and to those that emphasized the second syllable. Sorting words by sound and then in order led to lists that attracted comment, e.g., hiss, kiss, miss, piss, bliss.

This work was a good foundation for his later work on pronunciation in English, which defined over 20,000 words. Although this work was called A Dictionary of Words us'd in the English Tongue... it was a guide to spelling and pronunciation. The work included a number of suggestions for changing the spelling of various words and these suggestions were in time accepted into modern English. This work went through seven editions between 1723 and 1756.

== Major works ==
1. Vocabularium Latiale, or a Latin Vocabulary, in two parts, 8vo, London, 1708 or 1709; 5th edition, 8vo, London, 1728; 6th edition,. 8vo, London, 1735.
2. A Guide to the English Tongue, in two parts, 8vo, London,. 1709; 2nd edition, 8vo, London, 1710; 14th edition, 12mo, London, 1729. This, the forerunner of similar compendiums by Dilworth, Fenning, and Mavor, had the honour of being ushered into the world with lines addressed to my ingenious Friend the Author by poet laureate Nahum Tate. Another less famous poet, by name John Williams, enthusiastically declares

This just essay you have perform'd so well,
Records will shew 'twas Dyche first taught to spell.

1. The Spelling Dictionary; or, A Collection of all the common Words and Proper Names made use of in the English Tongue, 1st edition, London, 1723; 2nd edition revised, 12mo, London, 1725; 3rd edition corrected, 12mo, London, 1731; 4th edition corrected, with large additions, 12 mo, London, 1737.
2. A New General English Dictionary; Peculiarly calculated for the Use and Improvement of such as are unacquainted with the Learned Languages, 1st edition. London: Richard Ware, 1735. The publisher added this helpful note to the title page: "Originally begun by the late Reverend Mr. Thomas Dyche, ... And now finish'd by William Pardon, Gent." Many editions were subsequently published. A French version, with plates, by Père [Rev.] Esprit Pezenas, appeared in two vols. 4to, Avignon, 1756. Dyche was also author of ' The Youth's Guide to the Latin Tongue,' and ' Fables of Phaedrus, rendered into familiar English.'
