= Heinrich Plütschau =

German missionary

- Born: 1676; Wesenberg, Holy Roman Empire
- Died: 4 January 1752 (aged 75–76); Beidenfleth, Denmark–Norway
- Education: Martin Luther University of Halle-Wittenberg
- Occupations: Clergyman, missionary

Heinrich Plütschau (last name also Plütschow or Plütscho; 1676, Wesenberg, Germany – 4 January 1752, Beidenfleth, Germany) was along with Bartholomäus Ziegenbalg, the first German Lutheran priest to arrive in India.

== Life and work ==
Plütschau attended Friedrichswerdersches Gymnasium in Berlin with Joachim Lange as rector and then, studied Theology at the Martin Luther University of Halle-Wittenberg. There he came into contact with August Hermann Francke, the founder of the Francke Foundations. On a request of the Danish King Frederick IV for potential missionaries, Plütschau and his peer Ziegenbalg, were suggested by Lange. In 1705, they travelled to the Danish colony of Tranquebar on the southeastern coast of India, known as the Danish-Halle Mission.

The missionaries had already begun, during the voyage, to learn Portuguese, the lingua franca and the local Indian language, Tamil. With increasing work, the missionaries shared their community tasks. Plütschau focused on the parishioners who spoke Portuguese and Ziegenbalg on the Tamil-speaking community because of his particular language skills. In 1711, Plütschau returned to Germany for health reasons. There he brought out Luther's Small Catechism in Tamil and taught mission candidates in the language. In 1714, he received the pastorate of Beidenfleth, ruled at the time by the Danish Crown, where he worked until 1750. He died two years later.
