= Tamil Evangelical Lutheran Church =

Christian denomination in south India

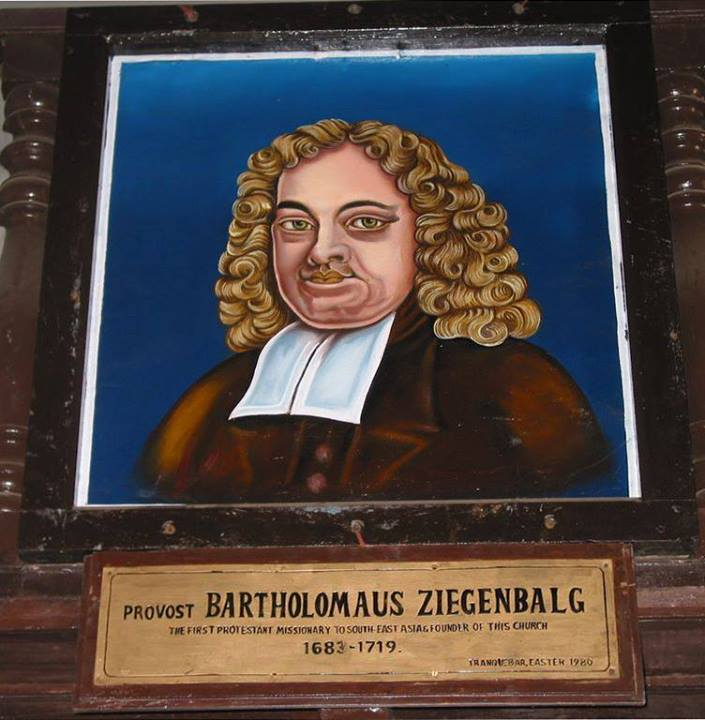

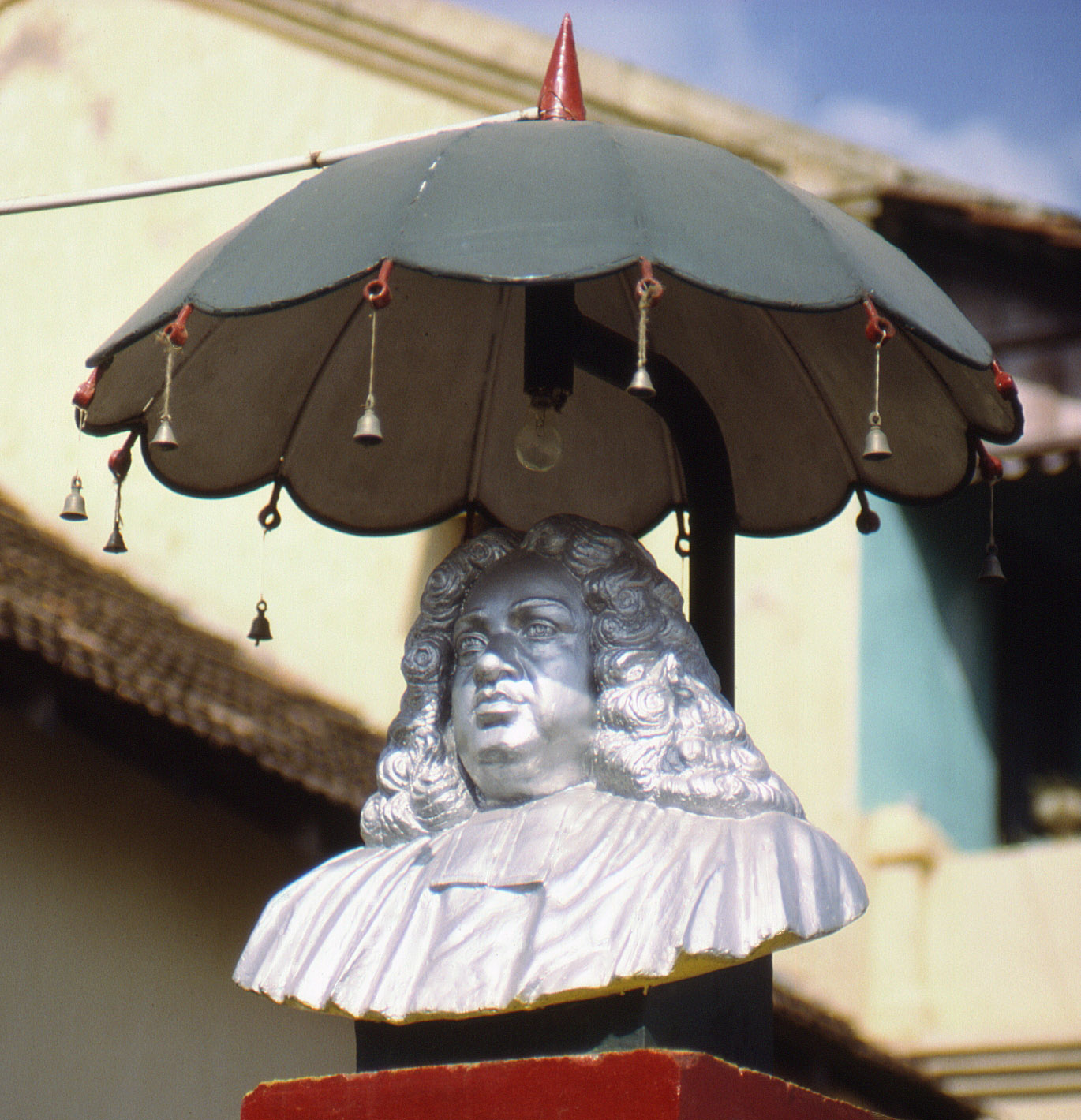
Bartholomäus Ziegenbalg monument in Tranquebar, Tamil Nadu, South India

The Tamil Evangelical Lutheran Church (TELC) is a Christian denomination in south India, which was established in 1919 and has approximately 500,000 members. Its headquarters is in Trichy, Tamil Nadu. It is one of the prominent Evangelical-Lutheran churches in Tamil Nadu.

On 14 January 1919, the Tamil congregation of different German, Danish, and Swedish Lutheran missions joined together to form the Tamil Evangelical Lutheran Church. In March 1921, the constitution of the TELC was amended to include the structure of episcopacy. In 1921, a Swedish missionary, Ernst Heuman, was ordained as the first bishop of the TELC. The bishop of TELC holds the title Bishop of Tranquebar.

Ernst Heuman, who served as the first presiding bishop of the Tamil Evangelical Lutheran Church in India, was ordained a priest in 1896 by Knut Henning Gezelius von Schéele (the Bishop of Visby) and consecrated as a bishop on 7 March 1921 by Hjalmar Danell (the Bishop of Skara) at New Jerusalem Church in the Indian city of Tranquebar (authorized by Archbishop of Uppsala Nathan Söderblom); Hjalmar Danell was confirmed as the Bishop of Tranquebar. The Swedish Line of apostolic succession was thus given to the Evangelical Lutheran Church in India.

In 1956, R B Manickam became the first Indian to be ordained as the bishop of TELC.

The bishops have the title Bishop of Tranquebar. It belongs to the Lutheran World Federation. The Leipzig Evangelical Lutheran Mission and Church of Sweden Mission were active in the area of Trichy in the 19th century and are still active there today. This Lutheran church comes under United Evangelical Lutheran Church in India.

== Presidents of TELC and Bishops of Tranquebar ==
- 1921–1926: Ernst Heuman
- 1927–1934: David Bexe
- 1934–1956: Johannes Sandegren
- 1956–1967: Rajah Bushanam Manikam
- 1967–1972: Carl Gustav Diehl
- 1972–1975: A. John Satyanadhan
- 1975–1978: Lasarus Easter Raj
- 1978–1993: Jayseelan Jacob
- 1993–1999: Jubilee Gnanabaranam Johnson
- 1999–2009: Thaveedu Aruldoss
- 2009–2014: H. A. Martin
- 2014–2019: S. Edwin Jayakumar
- 2019–2023: D. Daniel Jayaraj
- 2023–present: A. Christian Samraj

== Congregations ==
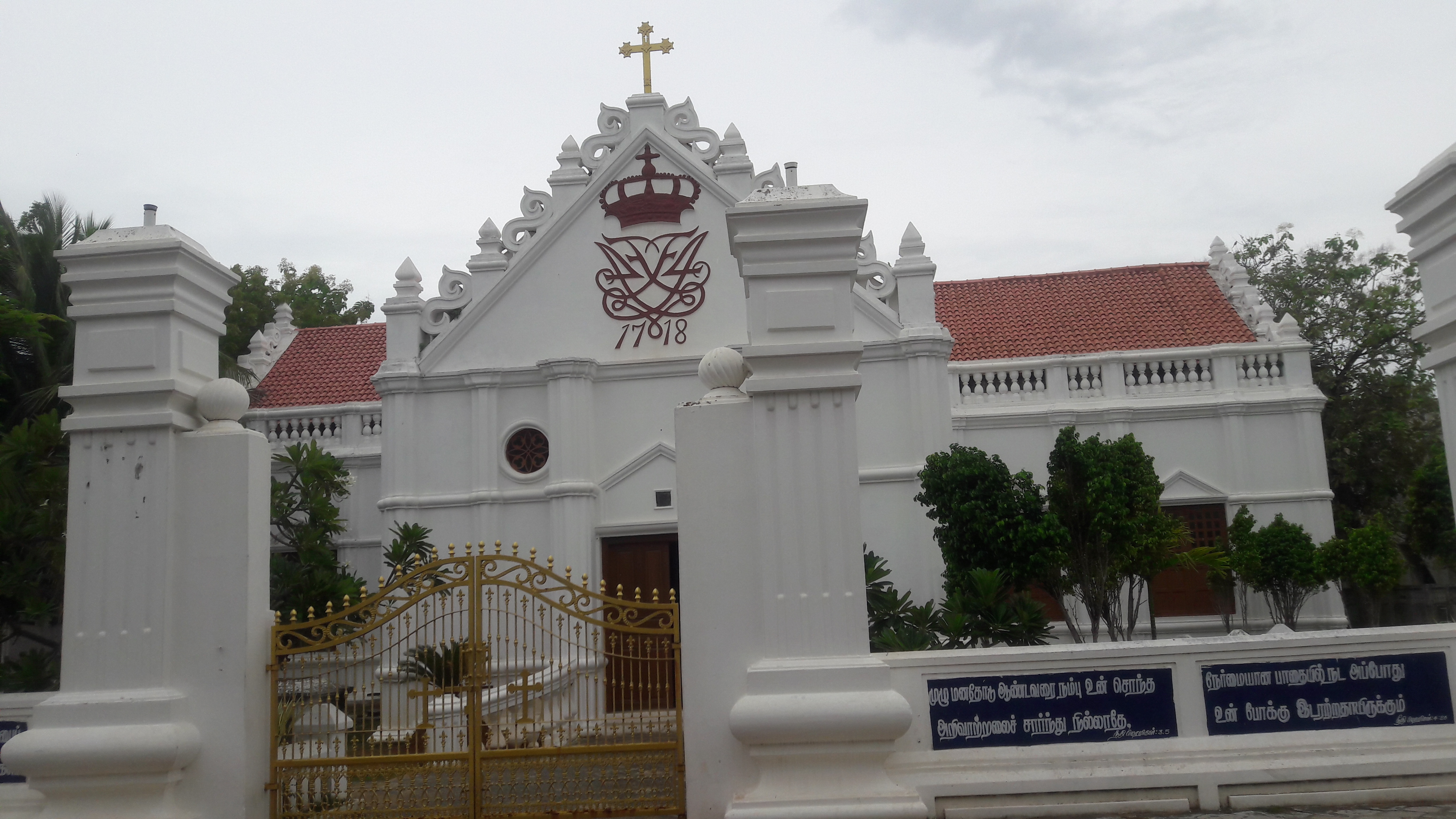
Tamil Evangelical Lutheran New Jerusalem Church

- TELC Ratchagar Church, Tiruvallur (த.சு.லு.தி இரட்சகர் ஆலயம், திருவள்ளூர்])
- TELC Good Shepherd Church, Kumaratchi Pastorate.
- TELC Immanuel church konerikuppam kanchipuram pastorate
- TELC Holy Trinity Cathedral, Tiruchirappalli
- TELC Holy Cross Church, kumbakonam.
- TELC Adhisayanathar Church, Erayamangalam
- TELC Adiaikalanathar Church, Chennai
- TELC Christ Church, Tambaram – 45
- TELC Christ Church, Thiruverambur, Tirchy- 13
- TELC Christ Church, Thiruvotriyur, Chennai-600019
- TELC Arulnathar Church, Kilpauk, Chennai
- TELC Anbunathar Church, Annanagar, Chennai
- TELC Holy Redeemer's Church, Madurai
- TELC Holy Immanuel Church, Mayiladuthurai
- TELC New Jerusalem Church, Tranquebar (Tharangambadi)
- TELC New Jerusalem Church, Nadukottai, Thirumangalam, Madurai.
- TELC Salvation Church, Madurai
- TELC Good Shepherd Church, Puthur, Trichy
- TELC Zion Church, Trichy-8.
- TELC Saviour Church, Eachampatti, Trichy
- TELC Christ Church, Anaimalai.
- TELC World Saviour Church-Uluthukkupai, Mailaduthurai
- TELC Abathu Sagayar Church, Kavalamedu. Manalmedu Pastorate.( த.சு.லு.தி. ஆபத்து சகாயர் ஆலயம் – காவாளமேடு )
- TELC Pavanasar Lutheran Church – Bangalore.
- TELC Ziegenbalg Jubilee Church – Sirkali
- TELC Pavasar Lutheran Church – Chidambaram
- TELC St.Paul's Church, Sengaraiyur
- TELC Arulnathar Church, Tirukattupalli
- TELC World Saviour Church, Pollachi
- TELC Bethlehem Church, (TBML College) Porayar
- TELC Arulnathar Church, Tirukattupalli
- TELC Saint John Church, Tiruchirappalli
- TELC Arockianathar Church, Thirupputhur, Sivagangai Dist
- த.சு.லு.தி கதிராலயம், பாண்டுர்
- TELC Holy Cross Church, Chengalpattu
- TELC Holy Comforter Church, Thanjavur
- TELC Ebineaser Church, Villupuram
- TELC Arulnathar Church, Kinathukadavu (த.சு.லு.தி. அருள்நாதர் ஆலயம், கிணத்துக்கடவு)
- TELC Karunainathar Church Kinathukadavu (த.சு.லு.தி. கருணைநாதர் ஆலயம், கிணத்துக்கடவு)
- TELC Bethel Church, Perambur, Chennai-11
- TELC Arulnathar Church, Tirupur-641601
- TELC Abishegha Nathar Church, Annamangalam, Perambalur-district.
- TELC Bethlehem Church Ambattur Chennai 600 053
- TELC Jesus Our Redeemer Church, Thirumangalam, Madurai.
- TELC Calvary Nathar Church, J.Alangulam, Thirumangalam, Madurai.
- TELC Good Shepherd church, Singanallur, Coimbatore – 641005.
- TELC St.John's Church, perambalur.# TELC St.Paul's Church, Pattavarthy. Manalmedu Pastorate.
- TELC Bethlehem Church, Sevvapet, Thiruvallur-602025
- TELC Christ King church, Kalpakkam – 603102
- TELC Arul Nathar Church, Sadras – 603102
- TELC THIRIYEGA NATHAR CHURCH, KOTTAIKARANPATTI, PUDUKKOTTAI (DT)-622515
- TELC ZION JUBLEE CHURCH, PUDUKKOTTAI.
- TELC RATCHANYA NATHAR CHURCH, SAMALAPURAM-641663.
- TELC JUBILEE CHURCH, PAMBARPURAM, KODAIKANAL-624103.
- TELC Union Christ Church, NGGO Colony, Coimbatore
- TELC Christ Church, Coimbatore
- TELC Arputhanather Church, B P Agraharam.
- TELC Nalmeipper Church, Kurumanoorkadu.
- TELC Jesus the world Redeemer Church, Kallikuppam
- TELC Ebinezar church, Karaikal
- TELC St.Peter's Jubilee Church, Melakottucherry, Karaikal
- TELC Bethel Church, V.NALLALAM 605651
- TELC MARTIN CHURCH, KAIVANDUR PASTORATE, THIRUVALLUR
- TELC ARULNATHAR ALAYAM, PATTANAM PUDUR, COIMBATORE - 641016

== Colleges and schools ==
- TBML College, Porayar
- TELC Teacher Training Institute (Male), Tranquebar
- TELC Bishop Johnson Memorial Higher Secondary School, Tranquebar
- TELC High School, Sengaraiyur
- TELC Primary School, Nathamangudi, Lalgudi Taluk
- TELC Bishop Hymen Memorial High School, Tiruchirappalli
- TELC Primary School, Tiruchirappalli
- TELC Teacher Training Institute (Female), Usilampatti
- TELC ELM Hr Sec School, Chennai
- TELC Lutheran Mission Central Higher Secondary School, Sirkali
- TELC Kabis Hr Sec School, Pandur
- TELC Girls Christian Higher Secondary School, Thanjavur
- TELC Middle School, Thanjavur
- TELC SR Bergendal Girls HR Secondary School, Kinathukadavu
- TELC Primary School, Kinathukadavu
- TELC Middle School, Karunakarapuri, Kinathukadavu
- TELC Primary School, Alampatti, Thirumangalam, Madurai.
- TELC Primary School, Kurayoor.
- TECL Primary School, Tirupur
- TELC Higher secondary school, Pudukkottai. In pudukkottai itself two schools are operating
- TELC Middle School, Pudukkottai.
- TELC TSM Primary School, Sirkali
- TELC PRIMARY SCHOOL, KOTTAIKARANPATTI, PUDUKKOTTAI (DT).
- TELC Primary School, Kavalamedu ( Manalmedu ) Mayiladuthurai- DT
- TELC middle school, Periyakuppam, Thiruvallur

== TELC-related seminaries ==
- Gurukul Lutheran Theological College and Research Institute, Chennai.
- Tamil Nadu Theological Seminary (TTS), Madurai.
- United Theological College (UTC), Bangalore.
