= Beidenfleth =

- Municipality
- Coat of arms

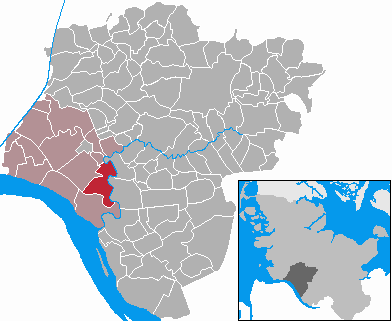
- Location of Beidenfleth within Steinburg district
- Interactive map of Beidenfleth
- Location within Germany Location within Schleswig-Holstein
- Coordinates: 53°52′41″N 9°24′55″E
- Country: Germany
- State: Schleswig-Holstein
- District: Steinburg
- Municipal assoc.: Wilstermarsch

Government
  - Mayor: Andreas Lorenz (CDU)

Area
  - Total: 13.57 km^{2} (5.24 sq mi)
- Elevation: 5 m (16 ft)

Population (2025-12-31)
  - Total: 822
  - Density: 60.6/km^{2} (157/sq mi)
- Time zone: UTC+01:00 (CET)
  - Summer (DST): UTC+02:00 (CEST)
- Postal codes: 25573
- Dialling codes: 04823, 04829
- Vehicle registration: IZ
- Website: www.wilstermarsch.de

Beidenfleth is a municipality in the district of Steinburg, in Schleswig-Holstein, Germany.
