= Kretzmann Commission =

1969 commission of the Andhra Christian Theological College

Kretzmann Commission Report
- Mission statement: to survey and study the task of theological education in the Churches related to the College Society
- Commercial?: no
- Location: Rajahmundry
- Owner: Board of Governors, Andhra Christian Theological College
- Founder: The Rev. M. L. Kretzmann, D.D., Secretary for planning, study and research, Department of World Missions of the Lutheran World Federation (Convenor),
- Country: India
- Key people: The Rev. K. Devasahayam, The Rev. A. B. Masilamani, The Rt. Rev. C. S. Sundaresan
- Established: 25 October 1969
- Disestablished: 29 November 1969
- Funding: World Council of Churches and the Lutheran Church in America

The Kretzmann Commission was a 1969 commission of the Andhra Christian Theological College, in Hyderabad, Telangana, India. It was formed in 1969 by the college's board of governors to survey and study the task of theological education in the Churches related to the College Society.

== Background ==
A couple of years before the Kretzmann Commission was constituted, seminarians deliberated on the church's mission with special reference to Andhra Pradesh and Telangana. In 1966, a graduate thesis was undertaken by a candidate studying at Serampore College entitled The Hebrew Concept of 'Righteousness' as proclaimed by the 8th century Prophets and its implications for the Church's mission in Andhra Pradesh

== Ecclesiastical societies ==
These ecclesiastical societies related to the college society at that point of time (1969) included:

- South Andhra Lutheran Church Society
- Samavesam of Telugu Baptist Churches Society
- Methodist Church of South Asia Society
- Convention of Baptist Churches of Northern Circars Society
- Church of South India Society (Dioceses of Dornakal, Krishna-Godavari, Medak, and Rayalaseema
- Church of India, Pakistan, Burma, and Ceylon Society, Diocese of Nandyal
- Andhra Evangelical Lutheran Church Society

== Commission members ==
- The Rev. M. L. Kretzmann, D.D., Secretary for planning, study and research, Department of World Missions of the Lutheran World Federation (Convenor),
- The Rev. K. Devasahayam, M.A., B.D. (Hon.), S.T.M., Andhra Evangelical Lutheran Church,
- The Rev. A. B. Masilamani, M.A., Th.M., Convention of Baptist Churches of Northern Circars,
- The Rt. Rev. C. S. Sundaresan, Bishop - in - Rayalaseema, Church of South India

== Findings ==
The commission members met during various points of time during the latter half of 1969, first on 25 October 1969 to draw up a plan and again a month later during 26–29 November to summarize its findings. The members of the commission met at different places for visitation and consultation. As part of field visits, the members had been to,

- Hindustan Bible Institute, Chennai
- Mennonite Brethren Centenary Bible College, Shamshabad
- St. John's Regional Seminary (Theologiate), Ramanthapur
- Ramayapatnam Baptist Theological Seminary, Ramayapatnam
- Lutheran Bible Training Institute, Rajahmundry

In addition, the members of the commission also had special consultations with Canon Emani Sambayya, Dr. P. David and Reverend Erik W. Nielsen. As for the background material, the commission members accessed scholarly action reports relating to the Andhra Evangelical Lutheran Church Society, especially the papers of B. V. Subbamma, S. W. Schmitthenner, W. P. Peery and James A. Bergquist, the papers of the Board of Theological Education of the Senate of Serampore College, the National Council of Churches in India and other papers. The commission took cognizance of the concerns of the church in Andhra Pradesh (Telangana included).

The commission also devised a structured questionnaire for use among two kinds of respondents, the church leaders and the old students, during field visits.

The Commission report was tabled before the Board of Governors of the College Society which eventually led to the building up of curriculum-intensive courses and the equipping of the seminarians with capacities to lead the church in Andhra Pradesh and Telangana. Theological education took an upward rise with the Kretzmann Commission Report. The Kretzmann Commission was enabled with the assistance of the Theological Education Fund of the World Council of Churches and the Board of World Missions of the Lutheran Church in America. The secretary of the Board of Governors, W. D. Coleman, on behalf of the board published 1,000 copies to be circulated among the Churches in Andhra Pradesh and Telangana.

== Outcome ==
At the very outset, the commission recommended for Indian teachers to be placed in seminaries to take up theological curriculum, especially for the core subjects in theology. The commission further recommended that theological education broaden its horizons in keeping up with the changing times. Based on the recommendations of the commission, the Andhra Christian Theological College did away with the erstwhile Licentiate in Theology programme and embarked on two graduate programmes, a Bachelor of Theology and a Bachelor of Divinity. As part of the curriculum study, the commission members foresaw the need to include worship, social analysis, interfaith, gender concerns, inculturation, psychology, language usability, personal devotion, sociology and many other interdisciplinary courses. In the ensuing decade, the faculty members were able to upgrade their academics at national and international universities and returned to teach in the college who included,

- G. Solomon, Th.M. (Eastern),
- K. Prasada Rao, M.Th. (Serampore)
- K. Wilson, Th.M. (Duke), Ph.D. (Syracuse)
- Victor Premasagar, M.A. (Cantab.), Ph.D. (St. Andrews)
- William Powlas Peery, M.A. (Vanderbilt), Ph.D. (Duke)
- S. Joseph, M.Th. (Serampore, D.Th. (Serampore)
- Eric J. Lott, M.Litt. (Lancaster), Ph.D. (Lancaster)
- Ryder Devapriam, Th.M. (McCormick), Th.D. (GTS)
- Muriel Spurgeon Carder, Th.M. (Union), Th.D. (Toronto)
- R. R. Sundara Rao, M.A. (Venkateshwara), Ph.D. (Wisconsin)
- R. Joseph, Th.M. (Andover), M.Th. (Serampore)
- M. Victor Paul, M.Th. (Serampore), Th.M. (Luther), D.Min. (Luther)
- K. David, M.Th. (Serampore), M.A. (Calcutta), Ph.D. (Edinburgh)

Many of these Teachers also played a role at the Senate of Serampore College (University) and subsequent curriculum revisions at the University level. In 1985, a Content analysis of theological syllabi being taught at the Seminaries in the country was undertaken by the Christian Institute for the Study of Religion and Society, Bangalore. The New Testament Scholar M. V. Abraham and the Old Testament Scholar G. Babu Rao, the former being associated with the Leonard Theological College, Jabalpur and the latter associated with the Bible Society of India in Translations were given the task of finding out the extent of theological syllabi using the statistical tool of Content analysis.

Similarly, a research on the theological education in India was also undertaken by Siga Arles in the 1990s at the University of Aberdeen and its findings were published with the title Theological education for the mission of the church in India, 1947–1987: theological education in relation to the identification of the task of mission and the development of ministries in India, 1947-1987, with special reference to the Church of South India which was published in 1990 by Peter Lang, Frankfurt.
