= M. Victor Paul =

Indian bishop (1935–2013)

President M. Victor Paul, AELC Ayyagaru
- The Reverend
- Church: Andhra Evangelical Lutheran Church
- Elected: 1993
- In office: 1993–1997
- Predecessor: K. Nathaniel, AELC
- Successor: G. Emmanuel, AELC
- Previous posts: Pastor, Andhra Evangelical Lutheran Church Society (1962–1969); Teacher – in – New Testament, Andhra Christian Theological College, Rajahmundry/Secunderabad (1969–2000)

Orders
- Ordination: April 1962 by K. Krupadanam, AELC
- Consecration: 1993

Personal details
- Born: Mortha Victor Paul; 7 April 1935 Rajahmundry, Andhra Pradesh
- Died: 14 October 2013 (aged 78) Rajahmundry, Andhra Pradesh
- Denomination: Christianity
- Parents: Mother: Smt. Sundaramma, Father: Mortha Sudarshanam
- Occupation: Priesthood
- Education: B. A. (Andhra), BEd (Andhra), B. D. (Serampore), M. Th. (Serampore), S. T. M. (Luther Seminary), D. Min. (Luther Seminary)
- Alma mater: Andhra-Christian College, Guntur, Government Training College, Rajahmundry, Gurukul Lutheran Theological College, Chennai, Luther Seminary, Saint Paul, Minnesota

M. Victor Paul (7 April 1935 – 14 October 2013) was a biblical scholar who served as President of the Andhra Evangelical Lutheran Church from 1993 to 1997.

== Early years and education ==
Victor Paul was born on 7 April 1935 into a pastoral family in Rajahmundry, East Godavari District in Andhra Pradesh as the eldest of nine children to Smt. Sundaramma and Pastor Mortha Sudarshanam. After undergoing schooling at the Lutheran Boarding in Peddapuram, his parents sent him to the Andhra-Christian College, Guntur. Paul studied arts (B.A.) in the college when Rao Sahab T. S. Paulus was at the helm of affairs. After completing graduate studies in Guntur, Victor Paul returned to Rajahmundry where he underwent studies in education at the local Government Training College leading to BEd.

== Spiritual studies ==
=== Graduate spiritual studies ===
Continuing the priestly family tradition, Victor Paul chose to pursue divinity and his Church Society, then under G. Devasahayam, AELC, sent him to Madras during the academic year 1959–1960 for ministerial formation at the Gurukul Lutheran Theological College (GLTC), Madras {affiliated to the Senate of Serampore College (University)} where Victor Paul pursued a graduate course in theology (B.D.), which was then headed by Dr. P. David, AELC and was awarded a graduate degree after completion of studies by C. Devasahayam, CBCNC, then Registrar of the Senate of Serampore College (University).

=== Post-graduate spiritual studies ===
After serving as a Pastor, Victor Paul's Church Society under G. Devasahayam, AELC (second term of presidency) sent him again to Madras where Paul was to pursue a post-graduate degree in New Testament (M.Th.) beginning from the academic year 1963–1964. Initially Victor Paul spent a year working on Greek with Jim Bergquist as well as on the revision of portions from the Westminster Dictionary of the Bible (Revised Edition) edited by Henry Snyder Gehman and John D. Davis.

From 1964 to 1965 onwards, Victor Paul registered as an M.Th. student with the Gurukul Lutheran Theological College and worked out a thesis entitled A theological exposition of 'to know' in the Johannine literature with some points of contact and contrast between John and Gita under the guidance of his Professor, Jim Bergquist and later at the end of the academic year 1965–1966, the Senate of Serampore College (University) awarded the post-graduate degree of M.Th. in New Testament, again during the Registrarship of C. Devasahayam, CBCNC.

In 1966, Victor Paul went to the Jesuit De Nobili College, Poona along with Gali Bali to attend the biennial conference of the scholarly Society for Biblical Studies in India held on the theme The significance of the historical in the New Testament Kerygma.

=== Spiritual studies abroad ===
When W. D. Coleman, AELC was principal of the Andhra Christian Theological College, Rajahmundry, the Board of Governors of the college accorded study leave to Victor Paul who proceeded to Saint Paul, Minnesota and pursued an S.T.M. in Pastoral theology and Ministry and for academic years 1971–1973 and worked out a thesis titled Toward a Counseling Oriented Ministry to the People of Andhra Pradesh in the Luther Seminary (a degree granting authority accredited by the Association of Theological Schools in the United States and Canada duly recognised by the United States Government as an accrediting agency). James A. Bergquist then Professor at the Luther Seminary was the guide of Paul and one of his companions hailing from Indian included the Religions Scholar, P. Kambar Manickam, TELC.

In 1976, A. A. Sitompul on behalf of the Lutheran World Federation invited Victor Paul to pursue doctoral studies (D.Min.) in Practical Ministry at the Luther Seminary, Saint Paul, Minnesota. Victor Premasagar, CSI, then principal of the college put up the matter before the Board of Governors of the college which decided to accord study leave to Victor Paul. While at the Luther Seminary, Victor Paul's doctoral thesis was entitled Socio-cultural dimensions of the Renewal of Ministry in Andhra Pradesh done under the supervision of James A. Nestingen, currently professor emeritus of Church History. By 1979, Victor Paul was awarded the doctoral degree D.Min. by the Luther Seminary and he returned to take up his teaching responsibilities back in India.

== Ecclesiastical ministry ==
=== Ordination & priesthood ===
At the end of the academic year 1961–1962, Victor Paul was awarded a B.D. and ordained in April 1962 as a Priest of the Andhra Evangelical Lutheran Church headquartered in Guntur. He was assigned a pastoral role in Samalkot and Peddapuram parishes. Victor Paul also replaced S. W. Schmitthenner, AELC, as honorary Youth Director of the Church Society.

When Victor Paul returned from Madras after his post-graduate studies, he was reassigned his former ecclesiastical duties in Samalkot and Peddapuram. Paul continued to serve in pastoral roles from 1966 to 1969 in the assigned Parishes.

=== Spiritual formator ===
In 1969, Victor Paul was relieved as Pastor and made Teacher – in – New Testament at the ecumenical Andhra Christian Theological College then located in Rajahmundry where he began teaching New Testament and Greek along with Muriel Carder, CBCNC and K. David, CBCNC, then members of the faculty teaching New Testament.

After a period of overseas exposure in spirituality during 1970–1973, Victor Paul resumed teaching responsibilities beginning with the academic year 1973–1974 at the ecumenical Seminary in Secunderabad after completing studies in North America. Among the new additions to the college faculty in Secunderabad were G. Solomon, STBC, Ryder Devapriam, CSI, R. R. Sundara Rao, AELC, R. Yesuratnam, CSI, and Ravela Joseph, STBC. By then, Victor Premasagar, CSI, had already become principal of the college in Secunderabad.

Again after a period of doctoral studies, Victor Paul rejoined the college in 1979 in Secunderabad, which by then had already seen new teaching staff being added onto its rolls, B. C. Paul, AELC, G. Sampurna Rao, AELC and B. J. Christie Kumar, STBC, who had just completed their postgraduate studies had joined the college in 1977. While this was so, the Old Testament Scholar G. Babu Rao, CBCNC of Serampore College had also moved, the same year, in 1977 to Secunderabad after efforts of Victor Premasagar, CSI in bringing him to the Seminary fructified.

== Contribution ==
=== Theological writings ===
- 1966, A theological exposition of 'to know' in the Johannine literature with some points of contact and contrast between John and Gita,
- 1973, Toward a Counseling Oriented Ministry to the People of Andhra Pradesh,
- 1979, Socio-cultural dimensions of the Renewal of Ministry in Andhra Pradesh

The Church Historian R. Joseph, a colleague of Victor Paul at ACTC, who compiled a bibliography of original Christian writings in Telugu with the assistance of B. Suneel Bhanu under the aegis of the Board of Theological Education of the Senate of Serampore College included a book by Victor Paul entitled The Liberated Ones: Explanations of Lutheran Catechism and Confessions published as early as 1981.

Victor Paul also authored the following theological books in Telugu published by the Telugu Theological Literature Board, Secunderabad which are devotional commentaries on:

- Gospels
  - The Messianic King in Gospel of Saint Matthew
  - Gospel of Saint Mark
  - Gospel according to Saint Luke
  - Gospel of John (also shown under Johannine Literature)
- Johannine literature
  - Gospel of John
  - First Epistle of John
  - Second Epistle of John
  - Third Epistle of John
  - Book of Revelation
- Pauline Epistles
  - Epistle to the Romans
  - Epistle to the Galatians
  - Epistle to the Ephesians
  - Epistle to the Philippians
  - Epistle to the Colossians
  - Epistle to the Hebrews
- General Epistles
  - Epistle of James
  - Epistle of Jude

Under the aegis of the Andhra Pradesh Council of Churches in 1974, a discussion was initiated on the theme Renewal of the ministry in Andhra Pradesh in which Victor Paul also participated. The findings of the consultation were later tabled before the Churches of Andhra Pradesh. A. A. Sitompul and others of the Lutheran World Federation took cognizance of Victor Paul's paper on Parish Renewal as early as September 1975 at an international consultation held at the Ecumenical Institute of Bossey in September 1975.

=== Scholarship ===
Martin Senftleben who researched at the Sri Venkateswara University in Tirupati acknowledged Victor Paul to be a Scholar.

Michael Bergunder, Professor of Missions at the Ruprecht Karl University of Heidelberg, Germany believes that Victor Paul attempted to recognise Charismatic Christianity which was fast enveloping traditional Christianity. Being a person who puts theory into practice, Victor Paul as principal of ACTC once went ahead and invited the pioneer charismatic Pastor, Apostle P. L. Paramjyoti, IPC to deliver the graduation address of the college in a particular year.

Excerpt from Victor Paul's article quoted by Prof. Michael Bergunder:

In the midst of leadership crisis, institutionalism, materialism, corruption and spiritual lethargy, there shines a ray of hope in the form of charismatic lay movement.... Today in almost all congregations of the Andhra Evangelical Lutheran Church (AELC), charismatic groups are evident and are begging for recognition.... AELC is faced with two options: one is to reject them totally as a religiously and emotionally perverted group or to recognize this lay charismatic movement as a natural reaction and a mute protest against evils and secularism existing in AELC. It is time now to own and recognise these charismatics.... With proper investigation, study and reflection on the charismatic Lay Movement within the established churches, one may help the traditional churches to re-discover their identity and relevancy of their faith and service in today's world.

=== Academic ===
- Member of the Senate of Serampore College (University)
- Member of the Research Committee of the Board of Theological Education of the Senate of Serampore College, Bengaluru.
- Andhra Christian Theological College (ACTC)

Victor Paul first began teaching New Testament in ACTC from 1969. Past-timers acknowledge Victor Paul as having an influence in students lives in unique ways. After the four-year cycle of principalship of the Samavesam of Telugu Baptist Churches ended in the academic year 1989–1990, the Andhra Evangelical Lutheran Church's cycle of principalship began. Besides Victor Paul, there were four other faculty from this Church Society teaching in the college at that time, namely, B. W. David Raju, AELC, B. C. Paul, AELC, G. Sampurna Rao, AELC, and C. Yesupadam, AELC. Since the participating Church agency decides the name of the principal, the Board of Governors of the college left the decision to the Andhra Evangelical Lutheran Church, then under the presidency of K. Nathaniel, AELC, which chose to nominate Victor Paul to the principalship of the ecumenical seminary for a term of four years.

Then Chairperson of the Board of Governors of the college, S. E. Krupa Rao of the Convention of Baptist Churches of Northern Circars appointed Victor Paul as principal of the college for a term of four years. As principal, Victor Paul was able to prove himself as an able Administrator following the footsteps of his predecessors and advocated the Ordination of women. One of the early women graduates of the United Theological College, Bangalore, Johanna Rose Ratnavathi, AELC, and a founding member of the Association of Theologically Trained Women in India was a three-time Dean of Women during the tenure of Victor Paul.

In the final phase of Victor Paul's tenure as principal, he contested the bishopric of the Andhra Evangelical Lutheran Church and proceeded on leave from the college. To fill the vacancy, the AELC then nominated Victor Paul's companion G. Sampurna Rao, AELC, as principal of the college.

=== Church leadership ===
When the term of K. Nathaniel, AELC, as President of the Andhra Evangelical Lutheran Church ended, Victor Paul contested and was elected in 1993 as the ninth president of the Andhra Evangelical Lutheran Church headquartered in Guntur. In 1997, before Victor Paul's term ended, he returned to Secunderabad to teach at the Andhra Christian Theological College then headed by R. Yesurathnam, CSI. Victor Paul retired in 2000.

Academic offices
Preceded by Suppogu Joseph, STBC	Principal, Andhra Christian Theological College, Secunderabad; 1990–1993	Succeeded by G. Sampurna Rao, AELC
Preceded by Komaravalli David, CBCNC	Teacher – in – New Testament, Andhra Christian Theological College, Secunderabad; 1969-2000	Succeeded by V. Manikya Rao, AELC
Religious titles
Preceded by K. Nathaniel, AELC	President, Andhra Evangelical Lutheran Church Society; 1993–1997	Succeeded by G. Emmanuel, AELC
