= Kretzmann =

Kretzmann is a surname. Notable people with this surname include:

- Colin Kretzmann (born 1947), South African cricketer
- Norman Kretzmann (1928–1998), American philosopher
- O. P. Kretzmann (1901–1975), American pastor and university president

== See also ==
- Kretzmann Commission, a 1969 commission of the Andhra Christian Theological College in India
- Krentzman, another surname
