= Ryder Devapriam =

Bishop B. R. Devapriam, CSI D. D. (Honoris Causa)
- CSI Bishop – in – Nandyal
- Church: Protestant Church of South India (comprising Anglican, Congregational, Presbyterian and Wesleyan Methodist: the SPG, WMMS, LMS, ABCFM, CMS and the Church of England)
- Diocese: Nandyal
- See: CSI-Holy Cross Cathedral, Nandyal
- Elected: 1985
- In office: 25 August 1985 – 4 September 1992
- Predecessor: P. John, CSI
- Successor: G. T. Abraham, CSI

Orders
- Ordination: by Society for the Propagation of the Gospel (SPG)
- Consecration: 1985, CSI-Holy Cross Cathedral, Nandyal by The Most Reverend I. Jesudasan, CSI, Bishop - in - South Kerala and Moderator (Principal consecrator), The Right Reverend Sundar Clarke, CSI, Bishop - in - Madras and Deputy Moderator (Co-consecrator)
- Rank: Bishop

Personal details
- Born: Billa Ryder Devapriam; 3 July 1931 Andhra Pradesh
- Died: 4 September 1992 (aged 61) Germany
- Buried: Nandyal
- Denomination: Christianity
- Occupation: Priesthood
- Profession: Pastor, Diocese of Nandyal, Church of South India (1956-1982); Teacher, Andhra Christian Theological College, Rajahmundry/Secunderabad (1964-1983)
- Education: B.A.(Madras), B.Ed. (Madras), M.A. (Nagpur), B.D. (Serampore), S.T.M. (McCormick), {Th.D. (GTS)}
- Alma mater: Madras University, Chennai (Tamil Nadu), Nagpur University, Nagpur (Maharashtra), Bishop's College, Kolkata (West Bengal), McCormick Theological Seminary, Chicago (United States), General Theological Seminary, New York City (United States)

Ryder Devapriam (3 July 1931 – 4 September 1992) was systematic theologian who taught during the 1960s and the 1970s at the Andhra Christian Theological College, a Protestant Regional Theologiate in Secunderabad, affiliated to the nation's first University, the Senate of Serampore College (University) {a University under Section 2 (f) of the University Grants Commission Act, 1956}with degree-granting authority validated by a Danish Charter and ratified by the Government of West Bengal.

Devapriam hailed from the Nandyal Diocese of the Church of South India and served as Bishop in Nandyal Diocese from 1985–1992.

== Studies ==
=== General ===
Devapriam pursued graduate and postgraduate degrees from Madras University, Chennai and Nagpur University, Nagpur.

=== Spiritual ===
Devapriam chose the vocation of Priesthood and enrolled for B. D. at the Bishops College, Kolkata where Emani Sambayya happened to be one of the Spiritual Formators.

Before joining as Faculty Member of the Andhra Christian Theological College in Rajahmundry, Devapriam pursued a postgraduate degree leading to Master of Sacred Theology specializing in the discipline of Systematic theology at the McCormick, Chicago.

While teaching at the Andhra Christian Theological College which by then relocated from Rajahmundry to Secunderabad, Devapriam sought study leave from the Board of Governors of the College for undergoing further studies on a World Council of Churches scholarship in 1975 enrolling at the General Theological Seminary, New York City and rejoined the Protestant Regional Theologiate in Secunderabad in 1981.

== Ministry ==
=== Teaching ===
Devapriam was on the faculty of the Andhra Union Theological College, Dornakal, teaching along with Eric J. Lott, CSI, P. Victor Premasagar, CSI and B. E. Devaraj. In 1964, efforts were made by some of the Protestant Societies to come together in forming a united theologiate in Andhra Pradesh and Telangana comprising the Anglicans, Congregationalists and the Wesleyans represented through the Church of South India and the Church of North India, the Baptists through the Convention of Baptist Churches of Northern Circars and later on by the Samavesam of Telugu Baptist Churches, the Lutherans through the Andhra Evangelical Lutheran Church and the South Andhra Lutheran Church and the Methodists through the Methodist Church in India.

The efforts towards coming together of some of the Protestant societies resulted in the formation of the Andhra Christian Theological College in Rajahmundry in 1964 which was carved out of four existing century-old seminaries, namely,

- the Andhra Union Theological College, Dornakal,
- the Baptist Theological Seminary, Kakinada,
- the Lutheran Theological College, Rajahmundry,
- the Ramayapatnam Baptist Theological Seminary, Ramayapatnam.

The Nandyal Diocese which was founded by the Society for the Propagation of the Gospel (SPG) was one of the founders of the College which was represented on the Faculty through B. E. Devaraj followed by Ryder Devapriam who joined the College during the 1960s in Rajahmundry and moved on to Secunderabad when the College was relocated serving under the Old Testament Scholars, W. D. Coleman, AELC and followed by P. Victor Premasagar, CSI. It was during the 1970s that Devapriam went on to pursue doctoral studies in 1975 and returned in 1981 by which time the New Testament Scholar K. David, CBCNC became the Principal.

During Devapriam's tenure at the College, his co-faculty included R. R. Sundara Rao, AELC, G. Solomon, STBC, Muriel Spurgeon Carder, CBCNC, M. Victor Paul, AELC, Suppogu Joseph, STBC, G. Devasahayam, AELC, Eric J. Lott, CSI Ravela Joseph, STBC and others. Devapriam taught Systematic theology along with Waldo Penner, CBCNC, one of the co-founders of the College hailing from the Convention of Baptist Churches of Northern Circars and was joined by R. Yesurathnam, CSI in 1974.

=== Pastoral ===
The Diocese of Nandyal, founded by the Society for the Propagation of the Gospel could not join the Uniting church (Church of South India) in 1947. During the intervening period, the Diocese was under the care of the Church of India, Pakistan, Burma, and Ceylon followed by the Church of North India. Finally, after protracted ecclesiastical conversations, the Diocese of Nandyal was able to join the Church of South India only in 1975. Devapriam, as a Priest of the Diocese of Nandyal had been involved in the ecumenical conversations resulting in the union.

In 1985, Devapriam was consecrated as Bishop by the Moderator Isaiah Jesudason, CSI and Deputy Moderator Sundar Clarke, CSI at the CSI-Holy Cross Cathedral in Nandyal. Devapriam was elected as the Moderator of the Church of South India Synod held in 1992 at the XXIII session held in the Diocese of Tirunelveli at Palayamkottai.

During Devapriam's bishopric lasting nearly a decade, he attended the twelfth Lambeth Conference in 1988 presided by Robert Runcie, CoE, the Archbishop of Canterbury.

== Honours, death and reminiscence ==
=== Honours ===
During the convocation of the General Theological Seminary, New York City held in March 1992, Devapriam was conferred with a Doctor of Divinity degree by Honoris causa along with other notable Clergy comprising Herbert W. Chilstrom of the Evangelical Lutheran Church of America, Robert Louis Ladehoff of the Episcopal Diocese of Oregon, Helen Brogden Turnbull of the Episcopal Church and Gayraud Wilmore of the Presbyterian Church.

=== Death ===
Devapriam died on 4 September 1992 during an overseas sojourn in Germany and within a day he was brought back to Hyderabad and then taken by road to Nandyal, where he was buried. Then-Prime Minister P. V. Narasimha Rao was instrumental in the quick passage of the body of Devapriam from Germany to India.

At the funeral ceremony held at Nandyal, bishops from the various dioceses of the Church of South India were present, including: P. Victor Premasagar; C. D. Jathanna; Samuel Amirtham; D. P. Shettian; N. D. Anandarao Samuel; S. J. Theodore; B. P. Sugandhar; G. Dyvasirvadam and others.

The Andhra Christian Theological College, where Devapriam had been a teacher, was also represented by the members of its faculty.

=== Reminiscence ===
Talathoti Punnaiah, who studied a 3-year theology course leading to Bachelor of Theology at the Andhra Christian Theological College, both at Rajahmundry and at Hyderabad from 1970–1973, recalls his association with Ryder Devapriam:

Ryder Devapriam was our English Teacher. He was well educated and had rich experience in administration. He visited me twice in Madras, once before going to the United States of America in 1974 and after returning in 1981. He was more than a teacher to me. I am so grateful for his moral support and love. I was invited to attend his consecration as bishop in Nandyal. He later became Moderator of the Church of South India.

Religious titles
Preceded by P. John, CSI	Bishop - in - Nandyal; Nandyal; 25 August 1985 – 4 September 1992	Succeeded by G. T. Abraham, CSI
Preceded by P. Victor Premasagar, CSI	Moderator, Church of South India Synod; Chennai; March 1992 – 4 September 1992	Succeeded by Vasanth P. Dandin, CSI
Academic offices
Preceded by Waldo Penner, CBCNC	Teacher - in - Systematic Theology, Andhra Christian Theological College, Rajahmundry/Secunderabad; 1964-1983	Succeeded by R. Yesurathnam, CSI
