= Andhra Christian Theological College =

Seminary in Telangana, India

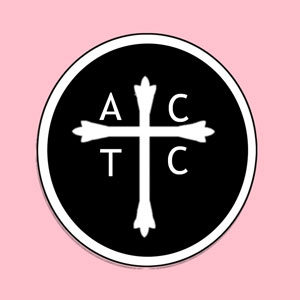
- Coat of arms
- Other name: ACTC
- Motto: Latin: Ad consummationem sanctorum in opus ministerii
- Motto in English: "Equipping the saints for the work of the ministry"
- Dean of Women: Smt. Lucy Mary Vimala Bai, CSI
- Warden: The Rev. B. N. Ratna Prakash, AELC
- Type: Affiliated institution
- Established: July 1, 1964; 62 years ago
- Founder: Churches in Telugu states
- Accreditation: Asia Theological Association
- Affiliations: Senate of Serampore College (University)
- Religious affiliation: Christianity
- Academic affiliations: Advanced Institute for Research on Religion and Culture
- Chairperson: Bishop P. Issac Vara Prasad, CSI
- Visitor: Bishop Anilkumar John Servand, MCI
- Principal: The Rev. B. Sunil Vara Kumar, CSI
- Dean: The Rev. L. Anitha, MCI
- Registrar: The Rev. V. Alfred Sudhakar, CBCNC
- Academic staff: 18+
- Total staff: 40+
- Location: Lower Tank Bund Road, Gandhinagar Post, Secunderabad, Telangana, 500 080, India; 17°25′00.4″N 78°29′17.7″E
- Campus: 10+ acres; Residential
- Language: Telugu and English
- Bursar: The Rev. G. Varaprasad, AELC
- Chaplain: The Rev. P. Usha Priya, STBC
- Website: www.actc.edu.in

Andhra Christian Theological College (ACTC) is a seminary in Telangana which was founded in 1964. It is affiliated with India's first university, the Senate of Serampore College (University) (a university under section 2(f) of the University Grants Commission Act, 1956), and has degree-granting authority under a Danish charter ratified by the government of West Bengal. ACTC is on the Hussain Sagar canal (north) in Gandhinagar, Hyderabad, about 4 kilometres (2.5 mi) from the Secunderabad Junction railway station.

Participating ecclesiastical societies,
Andhra Christian Theological College,
Secunderabad, Telangana

- Methodist
  - Methodist Church in India (MCI); 1964
- Lutheran
  - South Andhra Lutheran Church (SALC); 1964
  - Andhra Evangelical Lutheran Church (AELC); 1964
  - Good Samaritan Evangelical Lutheran Church (GSELC); 1992
- Baptist
  - Convention of Baptist Churches of Northern Circars (CBCNC); 1964
  - Samavesam of Telugu Baptist Churches (STBC); 1972
- Anglican, Congregational, Presbyterian and Wesleyan Methodist: the SPG, WMMS, LMS, ABCFM, CMS and the Church of England
  - Church of South India (CSI); 1964

== History ==
Succession of Old Testament faculty at ACTC, Rajahmundry, Andhra Pradesh (1964-1972) and Secunderabad, Telangana (1973-Present)
- W. D. Coleman, ELCA, PhD (Hartford),
- M. Vidyanandam, CSI, B.D. (Serampore),
- P. Victor Premasagar, CSI, PhD (St Andrews)
- G. Solomon, STBC, Th.M. (Eastern)
- G. Babu Rao, CBCNC, M.Th. (Serampore)
- Scott L. Harris, ELCA, PhD (Union)
- N. V. Luther Paul, AELC, D.Th. (Serampore)
- Ch. Vasantha Rao, CSI, Dr. Theol. (Hamburg)
- Henriette Howarth, C of E, M.A. (Utrecht)
- T. Mathews Emmanuel, CBCNC, D.Th. (Serampore)
- R. Jeeva Kumar, STBC, D.Th. (Serampore)
- K. Joseph Premavardhan, CSI, M.Th. (Serampore)
- G. Varaprasad, AELC, D.Th. (Serampore)
- G. David, SALC, M.Th. (Serampore)

The college was founded on the Lutheran Theological College campus in Rajahmundry and the founding societies included the Andhra Evangelical Lutheran Church, the Church of South India, the Convention of Baptist Churches of Northern Circars, the Methodist Church in India and the South Andhra Lutheran Church. The Samavesam of Telugu Baptist Churches held its B.D. classes at ACTC in 1967, and in 1972 the B.D. programme of the Ramayapatnam Baptist Theological Seminary was integrated into the college. When M. Victor Paul was principal (1991–1993), Good Samaritan Evangelical Lutheran Church joined the college.

Christian missions in Andhra Pradesh opened seminaries in Gooty (Union Theological Seminary), Dornakal (Andhra Union Theological College, for the Church of South India), Ramayapatnam (Baptist Theological Seminary, for the American Baptists), Luthergiri (Lutheran Theological College), Kakinada (Baptist Theological Seminary, for Canadian Baptists) and Shamshabad (Mennonite Brethren Centenary Bible College, for the Anabaptists). Although professors were exchanged among the seminaries, Bachelor of Divinity students attended Serampore College in West Bengal.

=== Merger ===
In 1964, the college was founded in Luthergiri, Rajahmundry, East Godavari with the merger of three theological colleges. In 1967, Ramayapatnam Baptist Theological Seminary, Ramayapatnam moved from Ramayapatnam to Rajahmundry, as a separate part of the college in Rajahmundry until it merged in 1972.

- 1964
  - Andhra Union Theological College in Dornakal,
  - Baptist Theological Seminary in Kakinada, and
  - Lutheran Theological College in Rajahmundry.
- 1972
  - Ramayapatnam Baptist Theological Seminary, Ramayapatnam

With William D. Coleman as its first principal, the college was dedicated on 1 July 1964 by R. M. Clark of the BTESSC. (Note: Formerly known as the Board of Theological Education of the National Council of Churches in India.) The inaugural address was delivered by Senate of Serampore College registrar C. Devasahayam in Rajahmundry.

=== Relocation ===
By 1973, the college had moved from Rajahmundry to Secunderabad due to pollution from nearby paper mills. The new buildings were dedicated by Church of South India bishop Pereji Solomon in the presence of Catholic archbishop Samineni Arulappa and seminarians from St. John's Regional Seminary. During the 1990s, the college's postal address changed to Hyderabad (now in Telangana).

Personalities

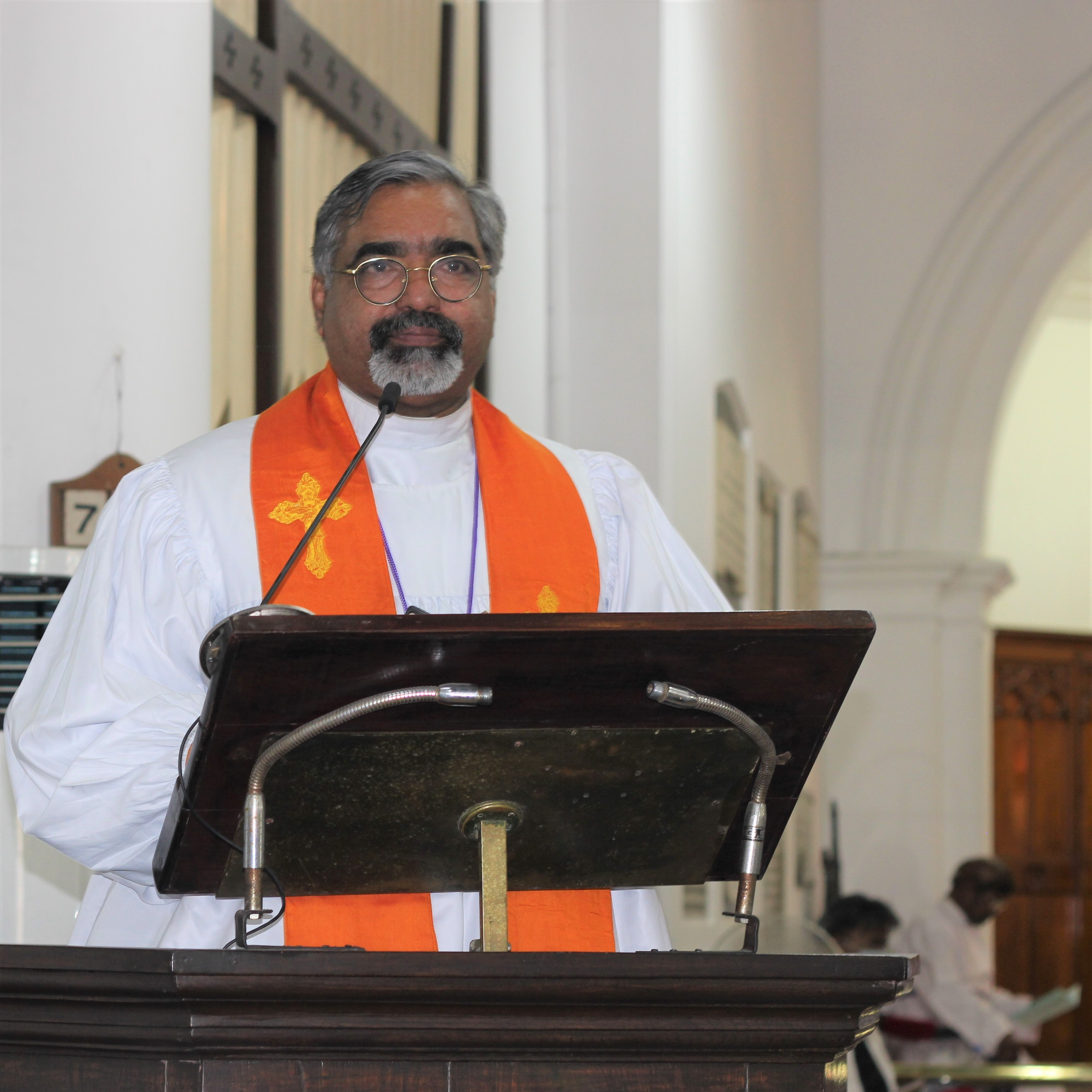
Bishop A. C. Solomon Raj, previously Chairperson of Board of Governors

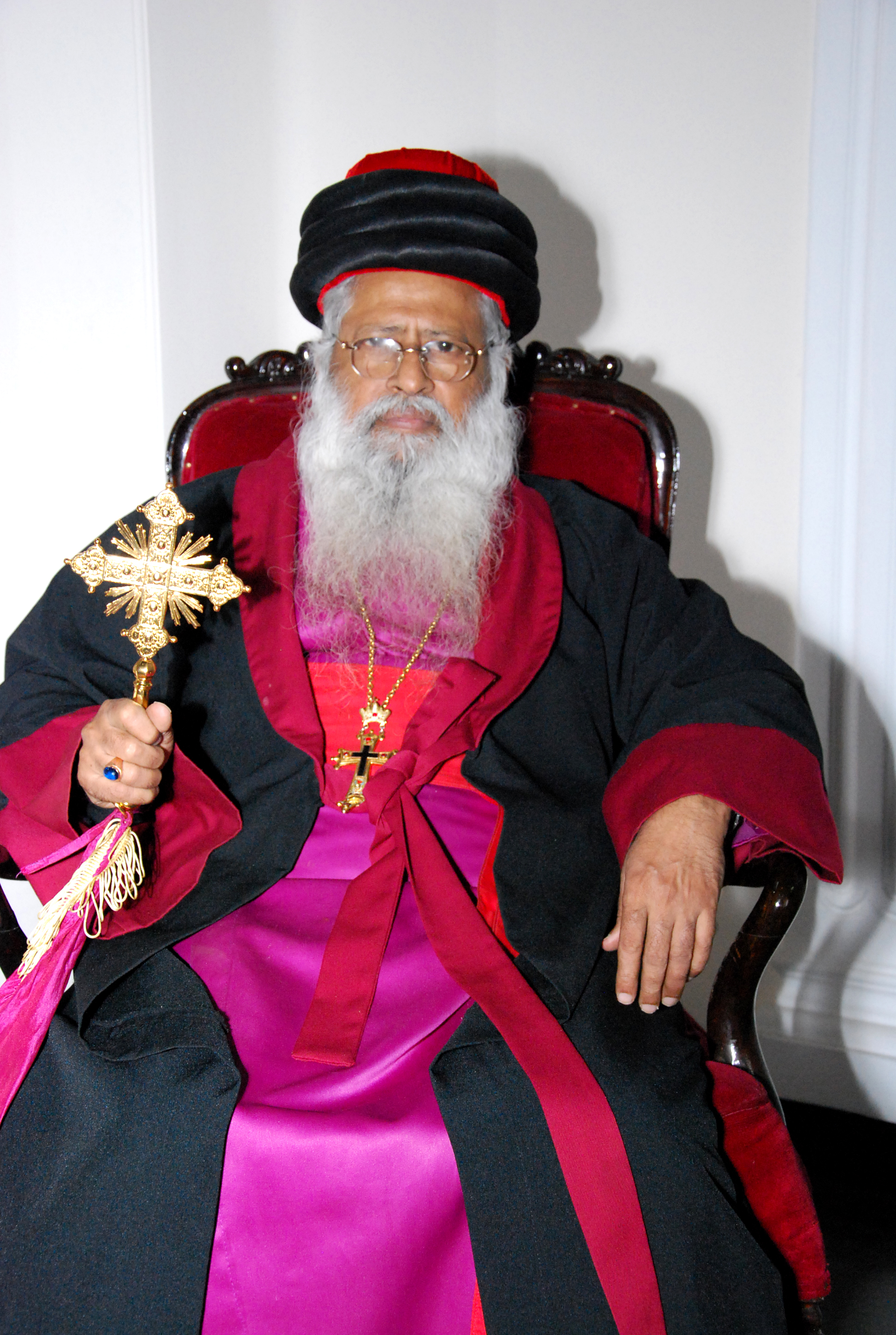
Aprem Mooken, a Visitor to the college in 1988.

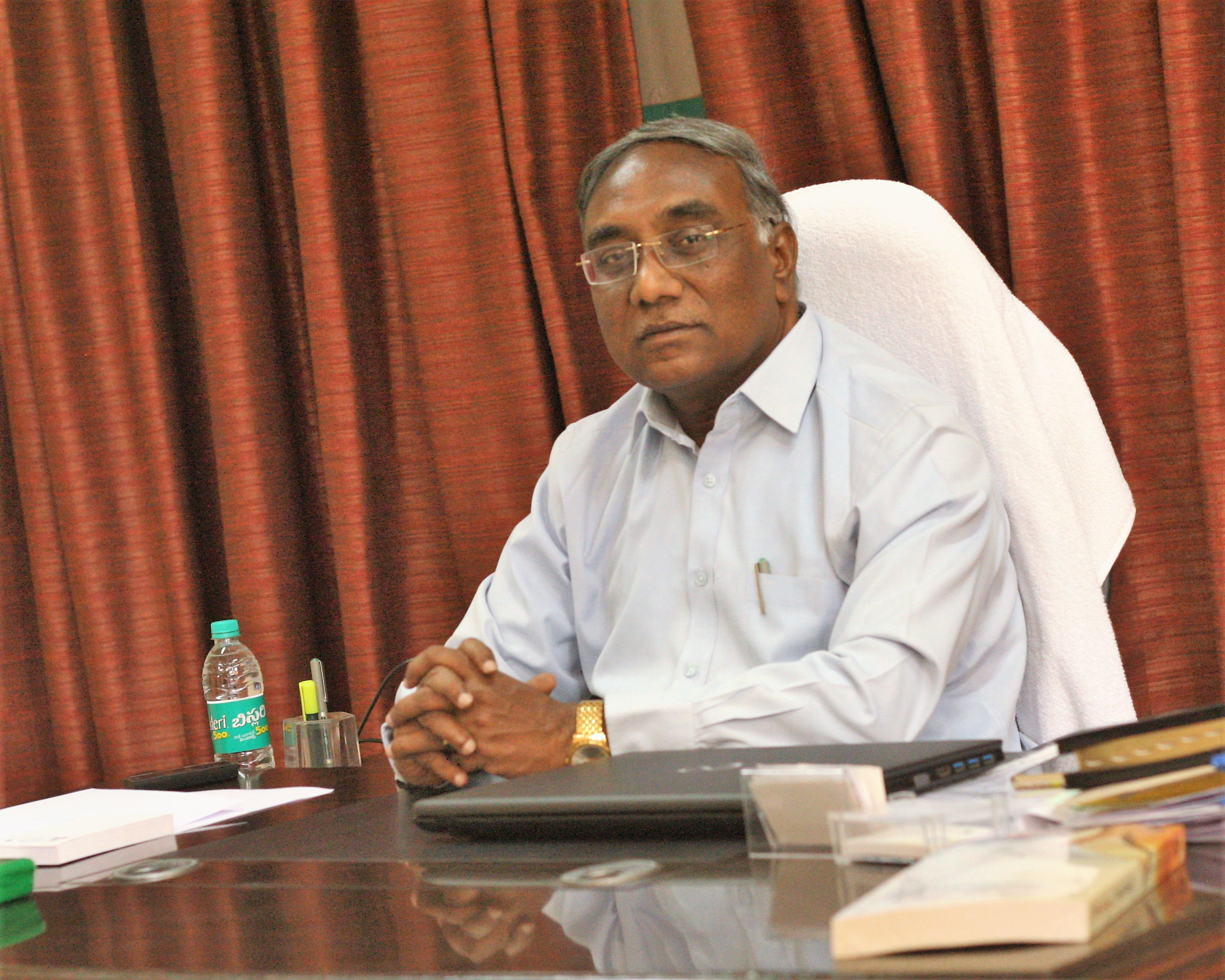
Homiletics Scholar, The Rev. A. John Prabhakar, an Alumnus of this institution, and past Principal.

== Overview ==
=== Kretzmann Commission ===
Succession of New Testament faculty at ACTC, Rajahmundry, Andhra Pradesh (1964-1972) and Secunderabad, Telangana (1973-Present)
- K. David, CBCNC, PhD (Edinburgh),
- Muriel Spurgeon-Carder, CBM, Th.D. (Toronto)
- M. Victor Paul, AELC, M. Th. (Serampore),
- S. Joseph, STBC, D. Th. (Serampore)
- K. Prasada Rao, STBC, M. Th. (Serampore),
- David Roland Hall, WMMS, M. Th. (Serampore)
- Klaus Schäfer, EMS, Dr. Theol. (Hamburg),
- V. Manikya Rao, AELC, D. Th. (Serampore),
- K. Suraj Kumar, CBCNC, PhD (Cape Town),
- M. John Sundar, CSI, M. Th. (Serampore),
- Ch. Helen Salomy, STBC, M. Th. (Serampore),
- G. Niranjan Nishchal, CSI, M. Th. (Serampore)
- V. John Pradeep Kumar, AELC, M.Th. (Serampore)

ACTC constituted the Kretzmann Commission in 1969, consisting of:

- M. L. Kretzmann, D.D., secretary for planning, study and research of the Lutheran World Federation's Department of World Missions
- K. Devasahayam, M.A., B.D. (Hon.), S.T.M., Andhra Evangelical Lutheran Church
- A. B. Masilamani, M.A., Th.M., Convention of Baptist Churches of Northern Circars
- C. S. Sundaresan, bishop of the Church of South India's Diocese of Rayalaseema

The commission's report, presented to the board of governors, suggested increasing the Bachelor of Divinity curriculum and abolishing the Licentiate in Theology programme.

== Administration and faculty ==
=== Board of governors ===
The college is administered by a board of governors composed of representatives of participating Protestant ecclesiastical societies:

- Telangana
  - Church of South India (CSI) Dioceses of Dornakal, Karimnagar, Medak (headquartered in Dornakal, Karimnagar and Medak)
  - Good Samaritan Evangelical Lutheran Church (headquartered in Bhadrachalam)
  - Methodist Church in India, Hyderabad Regional Conference
  - Samavesam of Telugu Baptist Churches Society, Deccan Association
- Tamil Nadu
  - CSI Dioceses of Madras and Vellore (headquartered in Chennai and Vellore)
- Andhra Pradesh
  - Andhra Evangelical Lutheran Church, headquartered in Guntur
  - CSI Dioceses of Krishna-Godavari, Nandyal and Rayalaseema (headquartered in Machilipatnam, Nandyal and Kadapa, respectively)
  - Convention of Baptist Churches of Northern Circars, originally headquartered in Kakinada
  - Samavesam of Telugu Baptist Churches, originally headquartered in Nellore
  - South Andhra Lutheran Church, headquartered in Tirupati

=== Motto ===
The college motto is derived from Ephesians 4:12, which reads in the Latin Vulgate: "Ad consummationem sanctorum in opus ministerii..." ("For the perfecting of the saints, for the work of the ministry..." in the King James Version).

=== Hall system ===
W. D. Coleman, the college's first principal, explained the hall system: "Each of the participating denominations has its own 'hall'. There are two hours of instruction each week about the liturgy, history, and policy of each denomination".

The churches commonly associated with Protestantism in southern India include the Anglicans, Congregationalists, Wesleyan Methodists, Baptists, Lutherans and Methodists. Each church has its own tradition. At ACTC, students learn their respective church doctrine in addition to general theology.

=== Principals ===
The principal serves a four-year term (2022–2026), with each participating church having an opportunity to provide a principal. The current principal is the Rev. B. Sunil Vara Kumar, CSI, D.Th. (Serampore).

Succession of Principals at Andhra Christian Theological College, Rajahmundry, Andhra Pradesh (1964-1972) and Secunderabad, Telangana (1973-Present)
Rotation	Church Society	Term	Years	No.	Principals	Tradition	Domicile
First Cycle	AELC	1964–1973	8	1.	W. D. Coleman, PhD (Hartford)	Lutheran	United States
First Cycle	CSI	1973–1980	8	2.	P. Victor Premasagar, PhD (St Andrews)	Wesleyan Methodist	Telangana
First Cycle	CBCNC	1980–1986	6	3.	K. David, PhD (Edinburgh)	Baptist	Andhra Pradesh
First Cycle	STBC	1986–1990	4	4.	S. Joseph, D.Th. (Serampore)	Baptist	Andhra Pradesh
Second Cycle	AELC	1990–1994	4	5.	M. Victor Paul, D.Min. (Luther)	Lutheran	Andhra Pradesh
Second Cycle	AELC	1990–1994	4	6.	G. Sampurna Rao, D.Min. (McCormick)	Lutheran	Andhra Pradesh
Second Cycle	CSI	1994–1998	4	7.	R. Yesurathnam, D.Th. (Serampore)	Wesleyan Methodist	Telangana
Second Cycle	CBCNC	1998–2002	4	8.	K. D. G. Prakasa Rao, M.Th. (Serampore)	Baptist	Andhra Pradesh
Second Cycle	CBCNC	1998–2002	4	9.	D. J. Jeremiah, M. Th. (Serampore)	Baptist	Andhra Pradesh
Second Cycle	STBC	2002–2006	4	10.	B. J. Christie Kumar, M.Th. (Serampore)	Baptist	Telangana
Third Cycle	AELC	2006–2010	4	11.	N. V. Luther Paul, D.Th. (Serampore)	Lutheran	Andhra Pradesh
Third Cycle	CSI	2010–2014	4	12.	Ch. Vasantha Rao, Dr. Theol. (Hamburg)	Wesleyan Methodist	Telangana
Third Cycle	CBCNC	2014–2018	4	13.	T. Matthews Emmanuel, D.Th. (Serampore)	Baptist	Andhra Pradesh
Third Cycle	CBCNC	2014–2018	4	14.	N. V. Vijaya Kumari, M.Th. (Serampore)	Wesleyan Methodist	Telangana
Third Cycle	STBC	2018–2022	4	15.	A. John Prabhakar, D. Th. (Serampore)	Baptist	Andhra Pradesh
Fourth Cycle	AELC	2022–2026	4	16.	T. Swami Raju, D.Th. (Serampore)	Lutheran	Andhra Pradesh
Fourth Cycle	AELC	2022–2026	4	17.	G. Varaprasad, D.Th. (Serampore)	Lutheran	Andhra Pradesh
Fourth Cycle	CSI	2026–	4.	18.	B. Sunil Vara Kumar, D.Th. (Serampore)	Congregational	Andhra Pradesh

== Serampore University affiliation ==
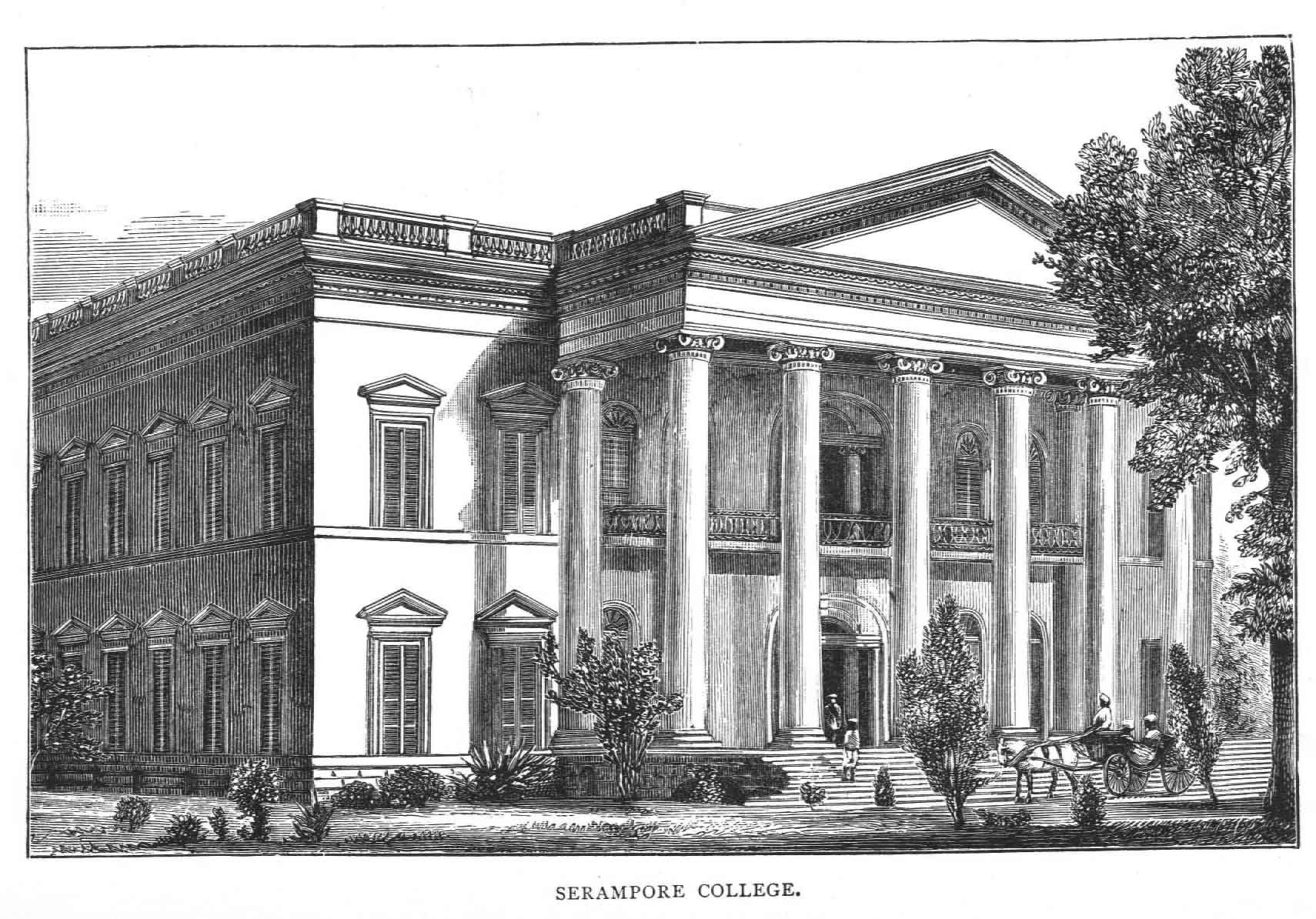
1887 drawing of Senate of Serampore College (University)

The college has affiliated since its founding with the Senate of Serampore College (University).

=== Degrees for pastors ===
ACTC and Serampore offer two degrees for pastors: Bachelor of Divinity (B.D.) and Master of Theology (M. Th.) under the aegis of Advanced Institute for Research on Religion and Culture (ARRC).

Campus

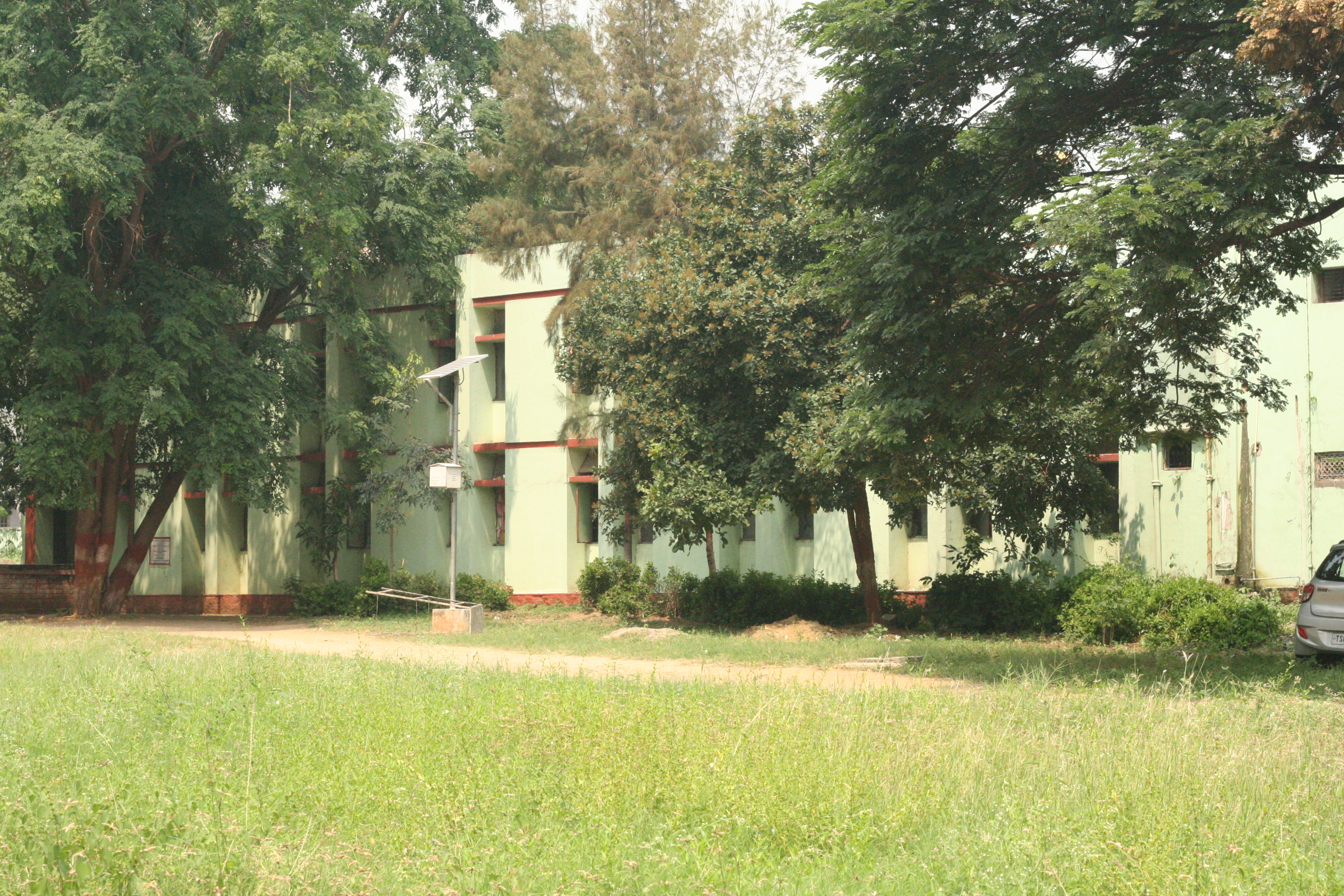
Dormitories

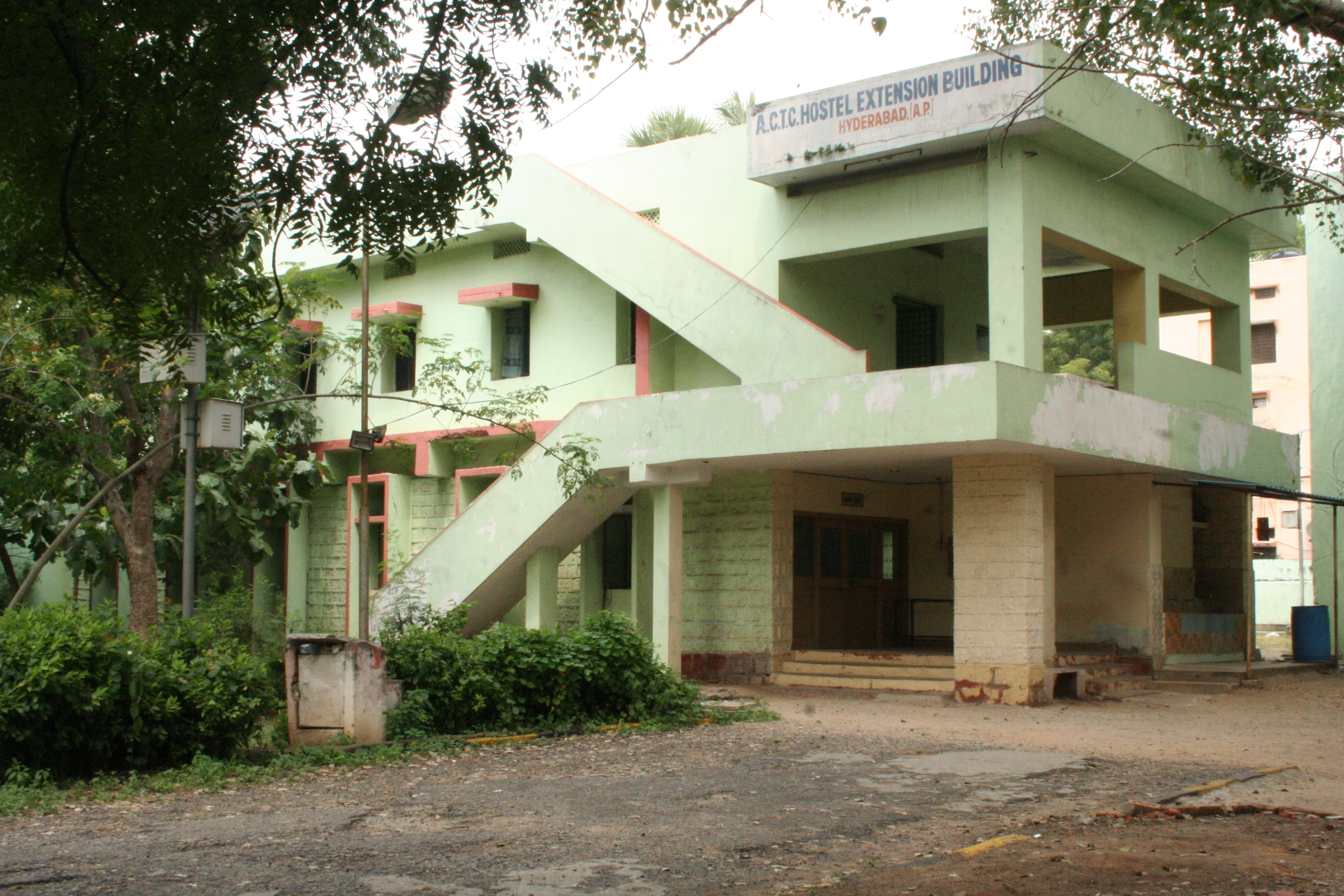
Refectory

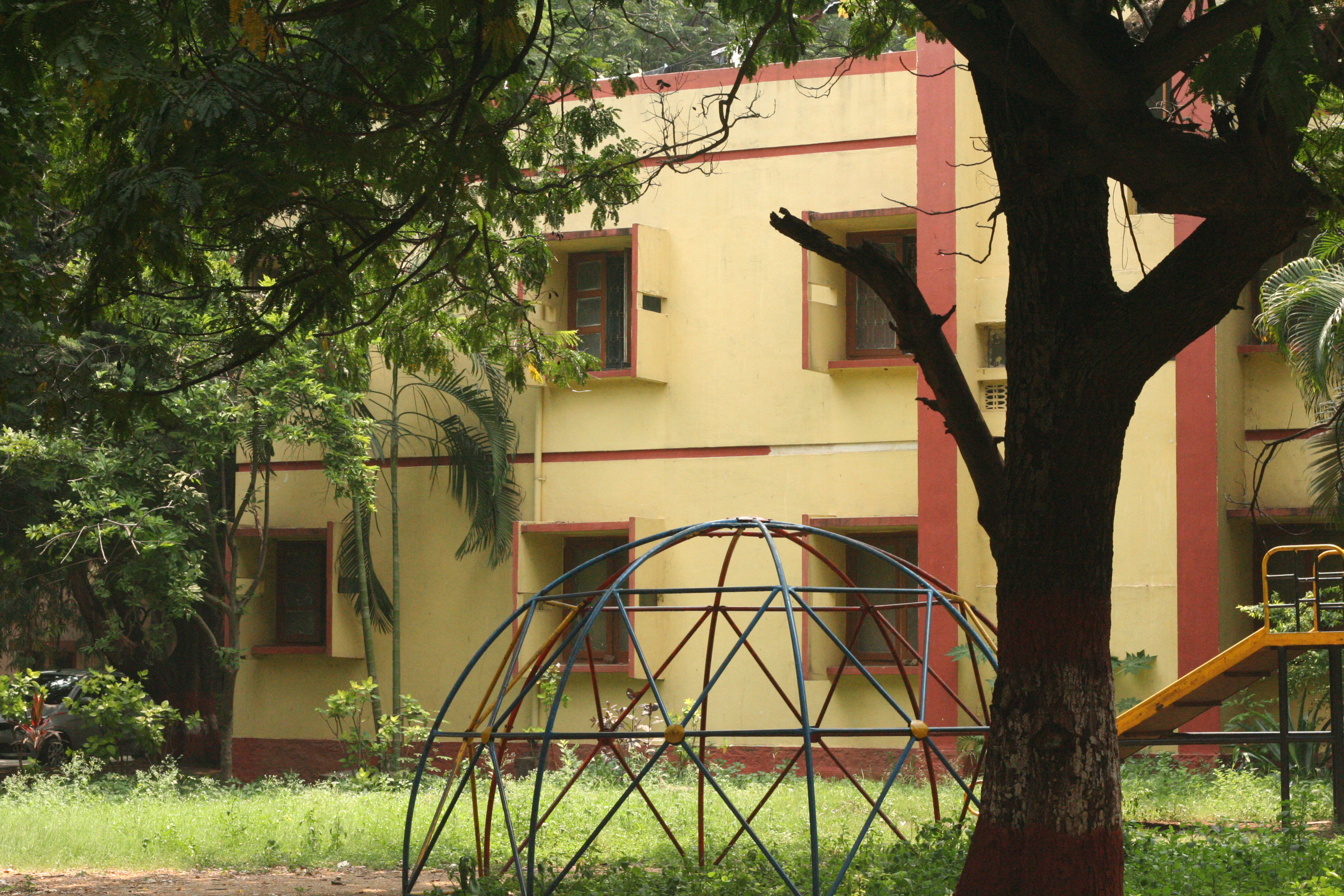
Students residential quarters

=== Distance education ===
Through distance education, ACTC has Bachelor of Christian Studies (B.C.S.) and Master of Christian Studies (M.C.S.) programmes for Christian students and a Diploma in Christian Studies (Dip. C.S.) programme for Christian and non-Christian students.

=== Registrar visits ===
When the college was founded in 1964, university registrar Chetti Devasahayam (CBCNC) delivered its inaugural address; registrar D. S. Satyaranjan visited the college annually. Current registrar S. K. Patro has visited ACTC to investigate the prospect of upgrading the college to a postgraduate institution.

=== University convocations ===
- Senate of Serampore College (University) has held two convocations at ACTC. The February 1979 convocation was hosted by college during the tenures of the Old Testament faculty Victor Premasagar, CSI and G. Babu Rao, CBCNC; both had been associated with the Serampore College. The convocation was attended by university registrar D. S. Satyaranjan and master A. D. Khan. The university president was Victor Premasagar. The Commemoration Mass was led by G. Babu Rao (CBCNC) at St. Gregorios Malankara Orthodox Syrian Cathedral near the college, and the convocation address was delivered by Samuel Rayan, S.J.
Campus

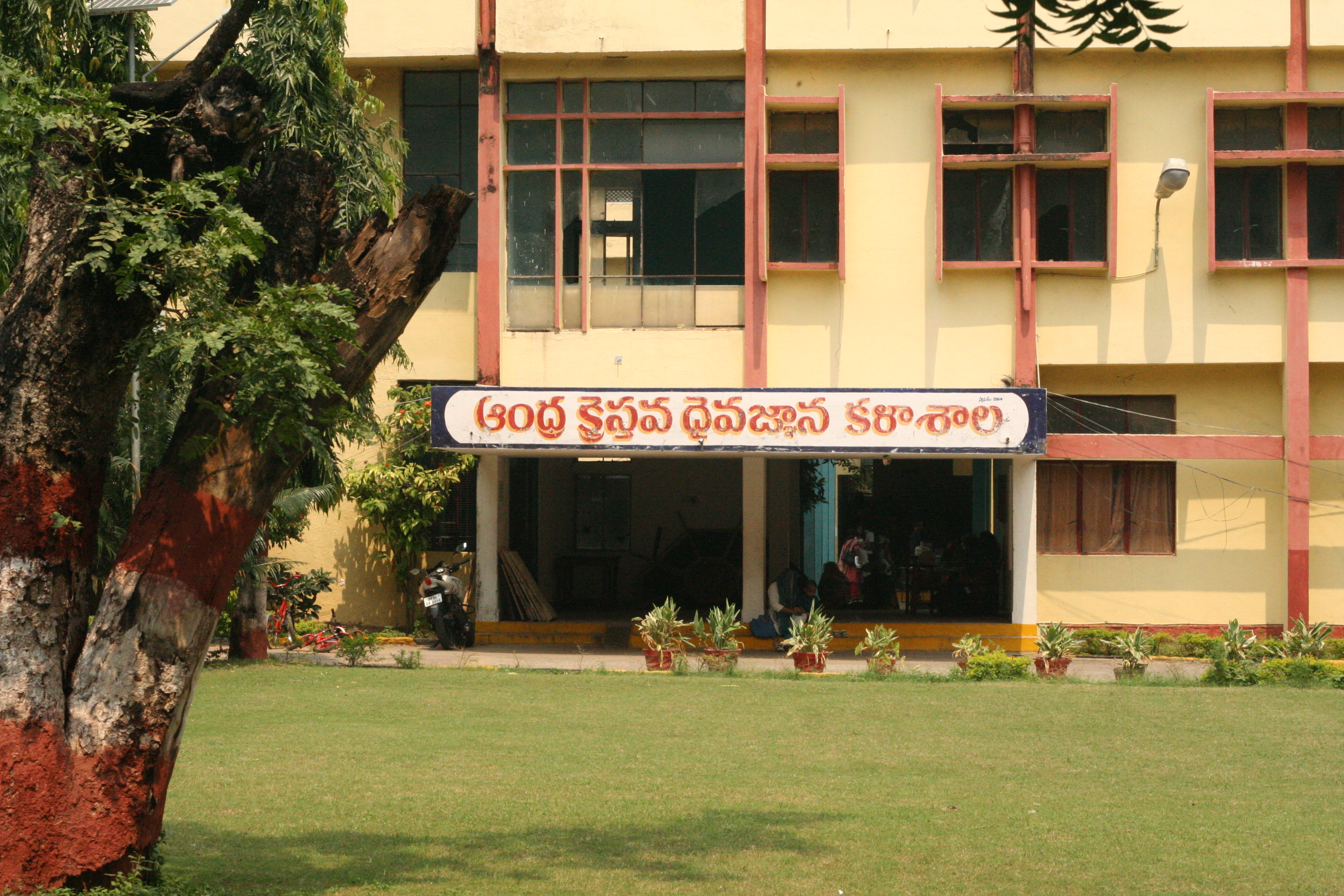
Academic block face

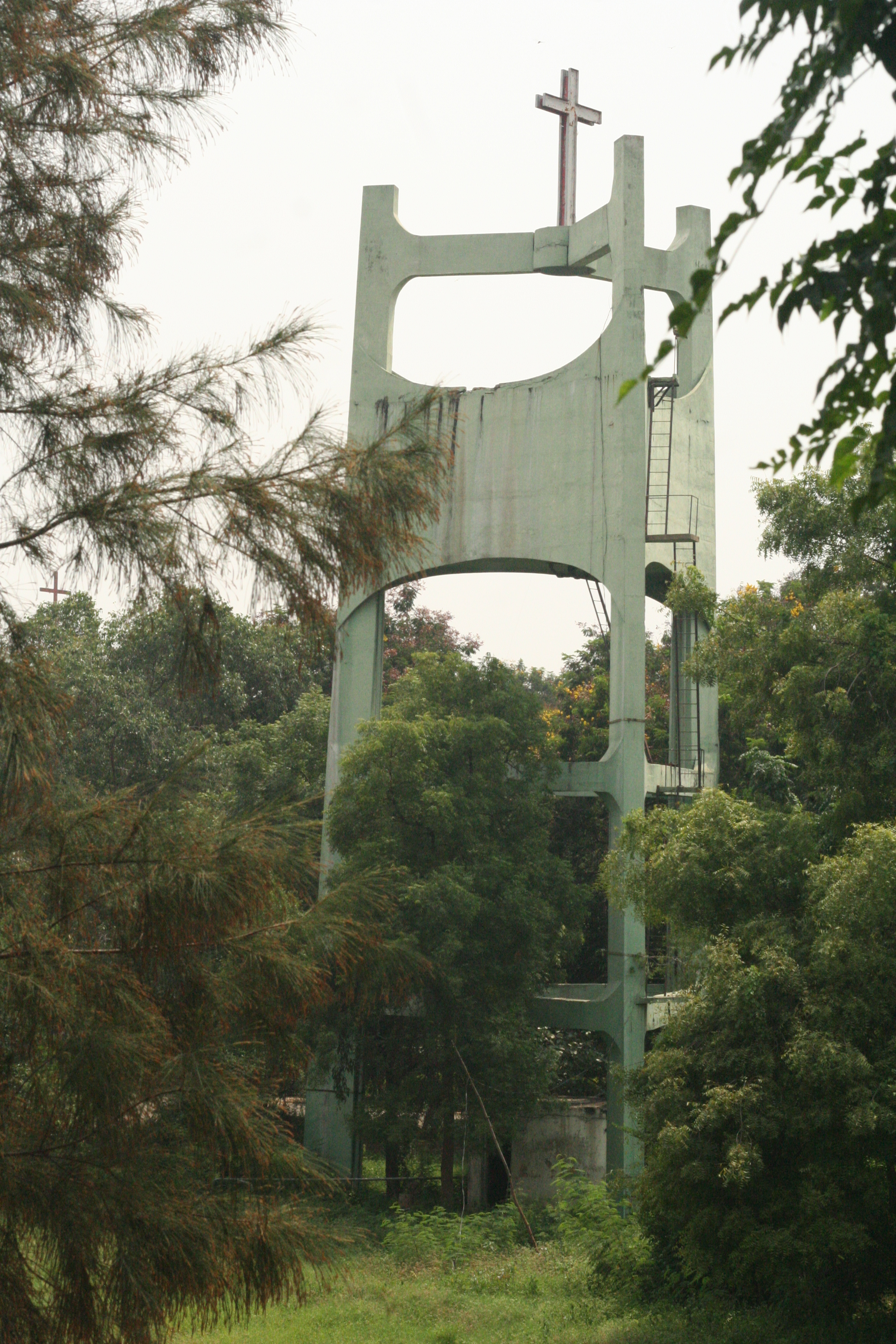
Bell tower

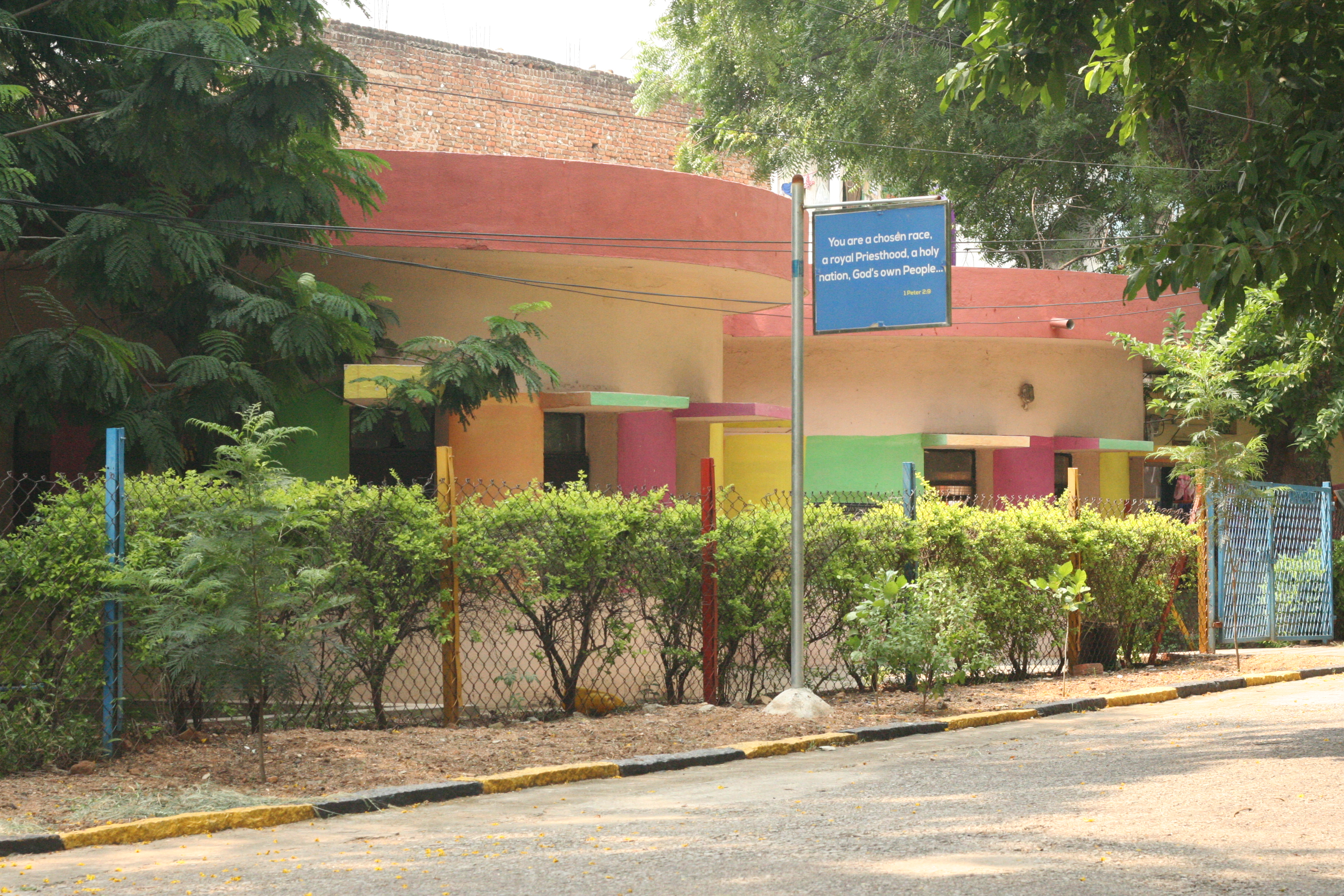
Creche

- The college hosted the 2016 convocation under the tenure of Old Testament scholars T. Matthews Emmanuel, CBCNC and Vasantha Rao, CSI. The university was represented by master John Sadananda, Senate president Issac Mar Philoxenos, South Asia Theological Research Institute dean P. G. George and university registrar S. K. Patro. The Commemoration Mass was led by S. I. Nirmal Kumar, CBCNC at the Chapel in the campus. The Convocation address was delivered by Klaus Schäfer. honorary doctoral degrees were conferred on D. S. Satyaranjan (who led the 1979 convocation) and Klaus Schäfer, who taught New Testament courses at the college from 1988 to 1993.

== Master of Divinity programme through ATA ==
The college has begun an initiative to admit Christian candidates to a M.Div. programme, for which it has been accredited by the Asia Theological Association.

== Academics ==
Present active faculty
Sl. No.	Subject	Name	Gender	Tradition	Highest Degree	Alma mater	University
I.	Christian ministry	L. Anitha, MCI	F	Methodist	M.Th.	GLTC, Chennai	Serampore
II.	New Testament	Ch. Helen Salomy, STBC	F	Baptist	M.Th.	UTC, Bangalore	Serampore
III.	History of Christianity	P. Usha Priya, STBC	F	Baptist	M.Th.	UTC, Bangalore	Serampore
IV.	Religions	K. Vimalesh Kumari, STBC	F	Baptist	M.Th.	ARRC, Hyderabad	Serampore
V.	Christian theology	S. Angela Veronica, AELC	F	Lutheran	M.Th.	UTC, Bangalore	Serampore
VI.	Religions	K. Jason, CSI	M	Anglican	M.Th.	ARRC, Hyderabad	Serampore
VII.	Old Testament	G. David, SALC	M	Lutheran	M.Th.	UTC, Bangalore	Serampore
VIII.	Christian Ethics	K. Silo, CSI	M	Anglican	M.Th.	UTC, Bangalore	Serampore
IX.	New Testament	V. John Pradeep Kumar, AELC	M	Lutheran	M.Th.	GLTC, Chennai	Serampore
X.	History of Christianity	D. Dasu, CBCNC	M	Baptist	M.Th.	UTC, Bangalore	Serampore
XI.	Communication	V. Alfred Sudhakar, CBCNC	M	Baptist	M.Th.	TTS, Madurai	Serampore
XII.	Christian Ministry	Y. J. Rajendra Prasad, STBC	M	Baptist	D.Th.	UTC, Bangalore	Serampore
XIII.	New Testament	G. Niranjan Nishchal, CSI	M	Wesleyan Methodist	M.Th.	UTC, Bangalore	Serampore
XIV.	Missiology	Ch. Joshi Ananda Prakash, AELC	M	Lutheran	M.Th.	GLTC, Chennai	Serampore
XV.	Social Analysis	M. Yonathan, STBC	M	Baptist	M.Th.	TTS, Madurai	Serampore
XVI.	Christian theology	B. N. Ratna Prakash, AELC	M	Lutheran	M.Th.	TTS, Madurai	Serampore
XVII.	Old Testament	G. Varaprasad, AELC	M	Lutheran	D.Th.	UTC, Bangalore	Serampore
XVIII.	Christian Ethics	B. Sunil Vara Kumar, CSI	M	Congregational	D.Th.	UTC, Bangalore	Serampore

Faculty on study leave
Subject	Name	Gender	Denomination	Degree	Studying	Institution	Leave period
Christian theology	S. I. Nirmal Kumar, CBCNC	M	Baptist	M.Th.	D.Th.	ETC, Jorhat	2023-2026
Christian theology	M. Gnanak Gerhardson, CSI	M	Wesleyan Methodist	M.Th.	D.Th.	NIIPGTS, Kolkata	2024-2027

=== Library ===
ACTC's library has reading-room facilities, over 38,000 books and 35 periodicals. When the college was founded, it was known as the Dunkelberger Memorial Library. The Evangelical Lutheran Church in America had sponsored the library in memory of Roy Martin Dunkelberger, AELC, a Lutheran missionary in Rajahmundry.

The library was renamed the Gipson Memorial Library in 2014 in honour of Baptist missionary T. G. Gipson, STBC, who had modernized the library during his second term as a visiting faculty member at the college. The renaming ceremony was held during the tenure of T. Matthews Emmanuel (CBCNC) as principal, in the presence of board of governors chair K. Frederick Paradesi Babu (AELC) and board member V. Prasada Rao (CSI).

== Student life ==
ACTC has recreational facilities which include throwball, tennis, basketball and volleyball courts, a table tennis room and a playing field for football and cricket. Daily mass is said in the chapel for students and teachers, and Sunday mass is open to the public. College festivals include the Christian Home Festival, Carey Day, CSI Day, Reformation Day, and Independence Day.

== Notable figures ==
=== Past Faculty ===
- Old Testament
  - W. D. Coleman, ELCA, PhD (Hartford): the college's first principal
  - M. Vidyanandam, CSI, B.D. (Serampore),
  - P. Victor Premasagar, CSI, PhD (St Andrews)
  - G. Solomon, STBC, Th.M. (Eastern)
  - G. Babu Rao, CBCNC, M.Th. (Serampore)
  - Scott L. Harris, ELCA, PhD (Union)
  - N. V. Luther Paul, AELC, D.Th. (Serampore)
  - Ch. Vasantha Rao, CSI, Dr. Theol. (Hamburg)
  - Henriette Howarth, C of E, M.A. (Utrecht)
  - T. Mathews Emmanuel, CBCNC, D.Th. (Serampore)
  - R. Jeeva Kumar, STBC, D.Th. (Serampore)
  - K. Joseph Premavardhan, CSI, M.Th. (Serampore) CSI
- New Testament
  - K. David, CBCNC, Ph.D. (Edinburgh)
  - Muriel Spurgeon-Carder, CBM, Th.D. (Toronto)
  - M. Victor Paul, AELC, M. Th. (Serampore)
  - S. Joseph, STBC, D. Th. (Serampore)
  - K. Prasada Rao, STBC, M. Th. (Serampore),
  - David Roland Hall, CoE, WMMS, M. Th. (Serampore)
  - Klaus Schäfer, EMS, Dr. Theol. (Hamburg),
  - V. Manikya Rao, AELC, D. Th. (Serampore),
  - K. Suraj Kumar, CBCNC, PhD (Cape Town),
  - M. John Sundar, CSI, M. Th. (Serampore),
- Christian Education
  - Alice M. Findlay, ABM,
- Social Analysis
  - B. W. David Raju, AELC, M.R.S. (Serampore),
  - P. K. Praveen Prabhu Sudheer, CSI, Ph.D. (Madras)
- Systematic Theology
  - Waldo Penner, ABM, M. Th. (Berkeley): pioneered attempts to found the college with A. B. Masilamani
  - Ryder Devapriam, CSI, Th.D. (GTS): bishop of the Diocese of Nandyal and moderator of the Church of South India Synod
  - Ravela Joseph, STBC, Th. M. (Andover): church history teacher and lyricist
  - B. J. Christie Kumar, STBC, M. Th. (Serampore)
  - G. Dyvasirvadam, CSI, M.Th. (Serampore): present bishop of the Krishna-Godavari Diocese and moderator of the Church of South India Synod
  - de:Jürgen Fangmeier, EMS, Dr. Theol. (Basel): taught systematic theology from 1987 to 1990
  - L. Raymond Waldock, CBM
  - M. Rajendra Babu, CSI
  - B. J. Moses Shanthi Kumar, CSI CSI
- Practical Theology/Homiletics
  - G. Devasahayam, AELC, S.T.M. (Philadelphia): third president of the Andhra Evangelical Lutheran Church
  - G. Sampurna Rao, AELC, D. Min. (McCormick)
  - Manoranjan Luke, MCI
  - Perapogu Joseph, STBC, Th. M. (Brite): Former Military chaplain and Pastoral care faculty
  - G. T. Abraham, CSI, Th.M. (Virginia): bishop of the Nandyal Diocese
  - K. Reuben Mark, CSI, PhD (Higginbottom): present bishop of Karimnagar Diocese
  - A. John Prabhakar, STBC, D. Th. (Serampore)
- Religions
  - W. P. Peery, ELCA, PhD (Duke): later taught at the United Theological College, Bangalore
  - Eric J. Lott, WMMS, PhD (Lancaster): later taught at the United Theological College, Bangalore
  - Louis F. Knoll, ABM, Ph. D. (Berkeley): co-founder of the college
  - R. R. Sundara Rao, AELC, PhD (Wisconsin): later principal of the Gurukul Lutheran Theological College in Chennai
  - K. D. G. Prakasa Rao, CBCNC, M. Th. (Serampore)
  - P. Alexander, SALC, M.Th. (Serampore)
  - N. V. Vijaya Kumari, CSI, M.Th. (Serampore)
  - T. Swami Raju, AELC, D.Th. (Serampore)
- Church History/History of Christianity
  - B. E. Devaraj, CSI, L.Th. (Serampore): wrote the Lambadi version of the New Testament
  - W. Gordon Carder, CBM
  - Tracy Gipson, ABM
  - B. C. Paul, AELC
  - C. Yesupadam, AELC
  - D. J. Jeremiah, CBCNC
  - K. L. Richardson, AELC
  - N. V. Grace, AELC
- Telugu
  - P. Dass Babu, CSI
- English
  - LaVerne Louise-Waldock, CBM
- Librarianship
  - Marjorie May Lynch-Gipson, ABM

=== Alumni ===
- Andhra Evangelical Lutheran Church
  - Bathineni Venkata Subbamma, Ph. D. (Wittenberg): first woman senator at Senate of Serampore College (University)
  - Ch. Victor Moses, M. Th. (Serampore): twelfth president of the church
  - V. E. Christopher, B. D. (Serampore): thirteenth president of the church
  - B. Suneel Bhanu, M. Th. (Serampore): fourteenth president of the church
  - K. Frederick Paradesi Babu, B. D. (Serampore): current church president
- International Pentecostal Holiness Church
  - B. S. Moses Kumar, Ph. D. (Agra)
- Convention of Baptist Churches of Northern Circars
  - M. S. G. Lalitha Kumari, B. D. (Serampore): First ordained Woman priest of the convention
- Church of South India
  - D. N. Samuel, B. D. (Serampore): fifth bishop of the Diocese of Dornakal
  - A. Rajarathnam, B. D. (Serampore): sixth bishop of Dornakal
  - Samuel Kanaka Prasad, B. D. (Serampore): sixth bishop of the Medak Diocese
- Church of South India (Continued)
  - B. D. Prasada Rao, M. Th. (Serampore): Bishop Emeritus of the Rayalaseema Diocese
  - Vadapalli Prasada Rao, B. D. (Serampore): present bishop of Dornakal
  - Eggoni Pushpa Lalitha, B. D. (Serampore): present bishop of the Nandyal Diocese
  - T. George Cornelious, B.D. (Serampore): present bishop of Krishna-Godavari Diocese
  - P. Issac Vara Prasad, B. Th. (Serampore): present Bishop - in - Rayalaseema Diocese
- Samavesam of Telugu Baptist Churches
  - Nalla Thomas, L.Th. and B.D. (Serampore)

=== Board of Governors ===
- Methodist Church in India
  - Elia Peter, Bishop Emeritus, Hyderabad Regional Conference of Methodist Church in India
  - M. A. Daniel, Current Bishop, Hyderabad Regional Conference of Methodist Church in India
- South Andhra Lutheran Church
  - O. Michael Benhur
  - K. S. Chandrasekhar
  - E. Vijayabhaskar
  - K. J. Premkumar
- Andhra Evangelical Lutheran Church
  - K. Devasahayam, B. A. (Andhra), B. D. (Serampore), Th. M. (LTSP)
  - S. W. Schmitthenner
  - K. Nathaniel L. Th. (Serampore)
  - G. Emmanuel L. Th. (Serampore)
  - N. Ch. Joseph
- Good Samaritan Evangelical Lutheran Church
  - S. Paul Raj
  - K. Abraham
- Convention of Baptist Churches of Northern Circars
  - K. P. Israel
  - S. E. Krupa Rao, S. T. M. (Union): Patriarch of the convention
  - C. L. Johnson, B. D. (Serampore)
- Samavesam of Telugu Baptist Churches
  - B. Victor Emmanuel
  - P. Sadanandam
  - S. Benjamin
  - N. Thomas, B. D. (Serampore)
- Church of South India
  - Eber Priestley, B.A. (Birmingham),
  - H. D. L. Abraham, B.D. (Serampore)
  - B. G. Prasada Rao, B.D. (Serampore), M.Th. (Serampore)
  - B. P. Sugandhar, B.D. (Serampore)
  - A. C. Solomon Raj, B. D. (Serampore), M. Th. (Serampore)
  - N. D. Ananda Rao Samuel
  - T. B. D. Prakasa Rao
- Church of South India (Continued)
  - P. Solomon
  - B. Prabhudass
  - G. Benjamin Devasahayam
  - K. E. Swamidass
  - S. John Theodore
  - P. Surya Prakash
  - G. S. Luke
  - D. N. Samuel
  - B. S. Devamani
  - Clement Venkataramiah
  - Ernest John
  - Pabbathi John
  - P. J. Lawrence
  - L. V. Azariah, B.D. (Serampore), Th. M. (WTS)
  - C. B. M. Frederick, B.D. (Serampore)
  - K. B. Yesu Vara Prasad, B.D. (Serampore)
