= Schmitthenner =

Schmitthenner is a surname. Notable people with the surname include:

- Paul Schmitthenner (1884–1972), German architect, city planner
- S. W. Schmitthenner (1928–2015), Indian Lutheran clergyman
