= Regunta Yesurathnam =

Indian priest (1941–2011)

The Reverend Doctor R. Yesurathnam
- Born: Regunta Yesurathnam; 16 October 1941; Nirmal, Nirmal district (previously under Adilabad district), Telangana, India
- Died: 8 August 2011 (aged 69); Hyderabad, Telangana
- Education: B. D. (Serampore), M. A. (Osmania), M. Th. (Serampore), D. Th. (Serampore)
- Alma mater: United Theological College, Bangalore (Karnataka), Selly Oak Colleges, Birmingham (England)
- Occupation: Priesthood
- Years active: 1967–2011
- Religion: Christianity
- Church: Church of South India
- Ordained: 1967, by Bishop Eber Priestley at the CSI-Medak Cathedral, Medak
- Writings: See section on writings
- Congregations served: Sangareddy and other towns under the ecclesiastical jurisdiction of the Diocese of Medak (1967-1974)
- Offices held: Teacher - in - Systematic theology, Andhra Christian Theological College, Secunderabad (India) (1974-2001), Principal, Andhra Christian Theological College, Secunderabad (India) (1994-1998), Guest Professor, de:Kirchliche Hochschule Wuppertal/Bethel (Germany) (1993), CWM-Missionary and Director, International University of the Caribbean, Kingston (Jamaica) (2001-2011)
- Title: The Reverend Doctor

Regunta Yesurathnam (16 October 1941 – 8 August 2011) was a priest hailing from the Diocese of Medak of the Church of South India, headquartered in Medak, notable as a systematic theologian who served as a faculty member from 1974 through 2001 of the Andhra Christian Theological College, affiliated to the Senate of Serampore College (University), in Secunderabad, Telangana, India.

Yesurathnam has been acknowledged for his contribution to the disciplines of dialogical theology and comparative religion.

As a pupil of another CSI systematic theologian, Joshua Russell Chandran, under whom he was groomed in the 1960s, Yesurathnam established himself as a scholar and during the subsequent decade, as evidenced by his interest in dialogical theology, Yesurathnam seemed to have been influenced by the religious scholars Stanley Jedidiah Samartha of the Church of South India (CSI), Herbert Jai Singh of the Methodist Church in India (MCI) and David C. Scott, also of the MCI. During the initial years of his doctoral research in the 1970s, it was Arvind P. Nirmal, CNI (the proponent of Dalit theology) who supervised and enabled Yesurathnam to push through his doctoral studies.

== Contribution ==
=== Dialogical theology ===
In a work about Dialogical Theology, with special reference to the activities of the World Council of Churches and its unit on Dialogue, Professor Jutta Sperber, of the University of Münster, Germany, has quoted the work of Yesurathnam on the Christian-Muslim dialogue. Similarly, Sonia Calza while researching on interfaith dialogue with reference to Hinduism and Christianity, referred to Yesurathnam's work on Dialogical Theology while writing about the contribution of Henri Le Saux.

=== Comparative religion ===
Yesurathnam, also wrote on the work on the concept of Avatara, which has been cited by other scholars. Bob Robinson noted this work with special emphasis on the relationship to Christianity and Steven Tsoukalas quoted Yesurathnam's work on the forms of Avatara.

=== Contextualization ===
Inter-disciplinary writings by Yesurathnam have struck new ground in inculturation as espoused by Swamy Amalorananda and the New Testament Scholar Suppogu Joseph, STBC (2007) had made a sustained research exploring possibilities for the Gospel to adapt itself to the multi-religious ethos of India. Earlier proponents who experimented with Contextualization, emphasizing on the presentation of Christ adapting to the Indian culture, were Robert de Nobili, SJ, E. Stanley Jones, MCI, and B. V. Subbamma, AELC, who together were known for their contribution to the Christian Ashram Movement in India.

Yesurathnam's definition of Contextualization has been acknowledged by scholars as a resourceful addition. Charles E. Van Engen and Akintunde E. Akinade refer to the word contextualization as defined by Yesurathnam.

=== Renewal of the Church ===
Yesurathnam cautioned the Church against falling into traditionalism. During the Golden Jubilee of the founding of the Uniting church, the CSI held in Chennai in 1997, Yesurathnam spoke on the ills befalling the Church in India,

(Adapted) The church hierarchy of Bishops, Presbyters, Deacons and Laity is turning into a Chaturvarna system, with the Laity and Women as the Shudras, the bottom-most caste.

Echoing the apprehensions by Yesurathnam, Stanley Jedidiah Samartha who was also present at the Jubilee in Chennai, pointed out that one must first introspect before raising cudgels against the Indian caste system and believed that one failed to notice the gradual transformation of the episcopacy into such a system. Yesurathnam, in an introduction to the book Jesus' Tears! by Elizabeth Thelma Johnson (2007), has highlighted the work of a Laity and appreciated their contribution towards the Christian missions.

== Studies ==
From his youth, Yesurathnam was inspired by the work of the Roman Catholic and Protestant Christian missions in Telangana. He entered the ministry of the Protestant Church through the Diocese of Medak, becoming a ministerial candidate during the bishopric of Frank Whittaker, the first Bishop-in-Medak. He studied at a seminary in Bangalore for spiritual formation and was ordained in 1967 by Bishop Eber Priestley, the then Bishop-in-Medak.

=== Graduate ===
After initial schooling at the mission schools founded by the Wesleyan Methodist Missionary Society (WMMS) in Telangana, Yesurathnam decided to take up priesthood. Bishops Frank Whittaker and Eber Priestley, successively, became his Spiritual Confessors and led him to take up spiritual studies at the United Theological College, Bangalore during 1963–1967. He was awarded a B. D. degree.

=== Postgraduate ===
In 1969, Yesurathnam was recalled from parish work and sent to the Protestant Regional Theologiate in Bangalore for further spiritual studies that lasted until 1972 and resulted in the award of a Master of Theology degree after research under Joshua Russell Chandran of the CSI.

=== Doctoral ===
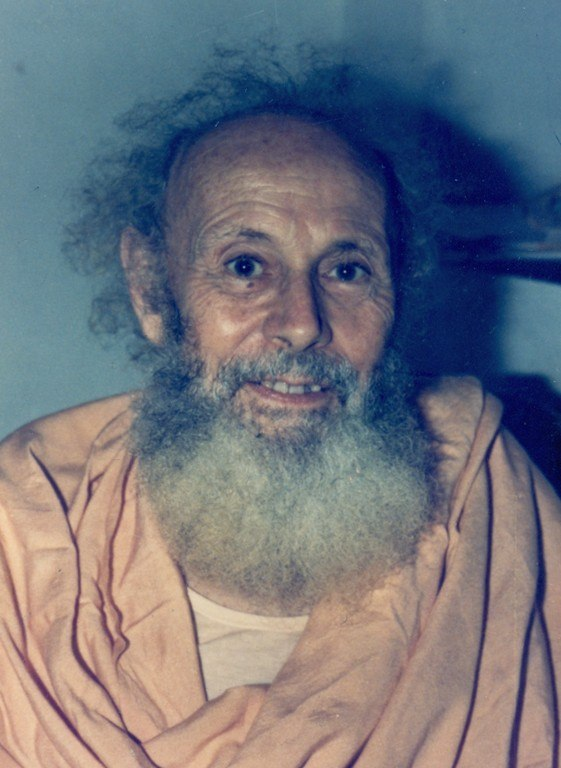
Henri Le Saux, OSB (1910-1973) (Swami Abhishiktananda); Yesurathnam researched during 1978–1982 on Benedictine monk's experiences of spirituality as found in Hinduism and Christianity

After a five-year teaching ministry that began in 1974 at the Andhra Christian Theological College, Secunderabad, Yesurathnam qualified to undertake doctoral level research in 1978 and was granted a five-year study leave. Yesurathnam's Bishop during that period, B. G. Prasada Rao, made efforts to ensure that Yesurathnam was able to join his alma mater, the United Theological College, Bangalore, where he was able to take up research in the discipline of systematic theology under the guidance of Arvind P. Nirmal, CNI. Yesurathnam also came under the tutelage of Stanley Jedidiah Samartha, a leading authority on Dialogical Theology. During the research period between 1978 and 1982, Yesurathnam was also sent to the University of Birmingham, England, in 1979 for a two-year research exposure through the efforts of Gordon Shaw who ensured his overseas travel and stay in England at Kingsmead College under the Selly Oak Colleges, where he was supervised by Walter Jacob Hollenweger, a leading authority on Pentecostalism.

By 1981, Yesurathnam returned to the United Theological College and began shaping his doctoral dissertation under the guidance of David C. Scott and by 1982, he rejoined the Andhra Christian Theological College, which by then was being led by the New Testament scholar, K. David, CBCNC and took up his teaching role in systematic theology, but was able to submit his doctoral thesis to the university through his supervisor at the United Theological College and finally in 1987, much before nearing a decade of registering with the university, it awarded the degree of Doctor of Theology.

Though Yesurathnam sought permission from the Senate of Serampore College to publish his doctoral work nearly two decades later, in 2006. His thesis was already being referred by research scholars on works relating to the contribution of Swami Abhishiktananda.

== Ministry ==
=== Pastoral ministry ===
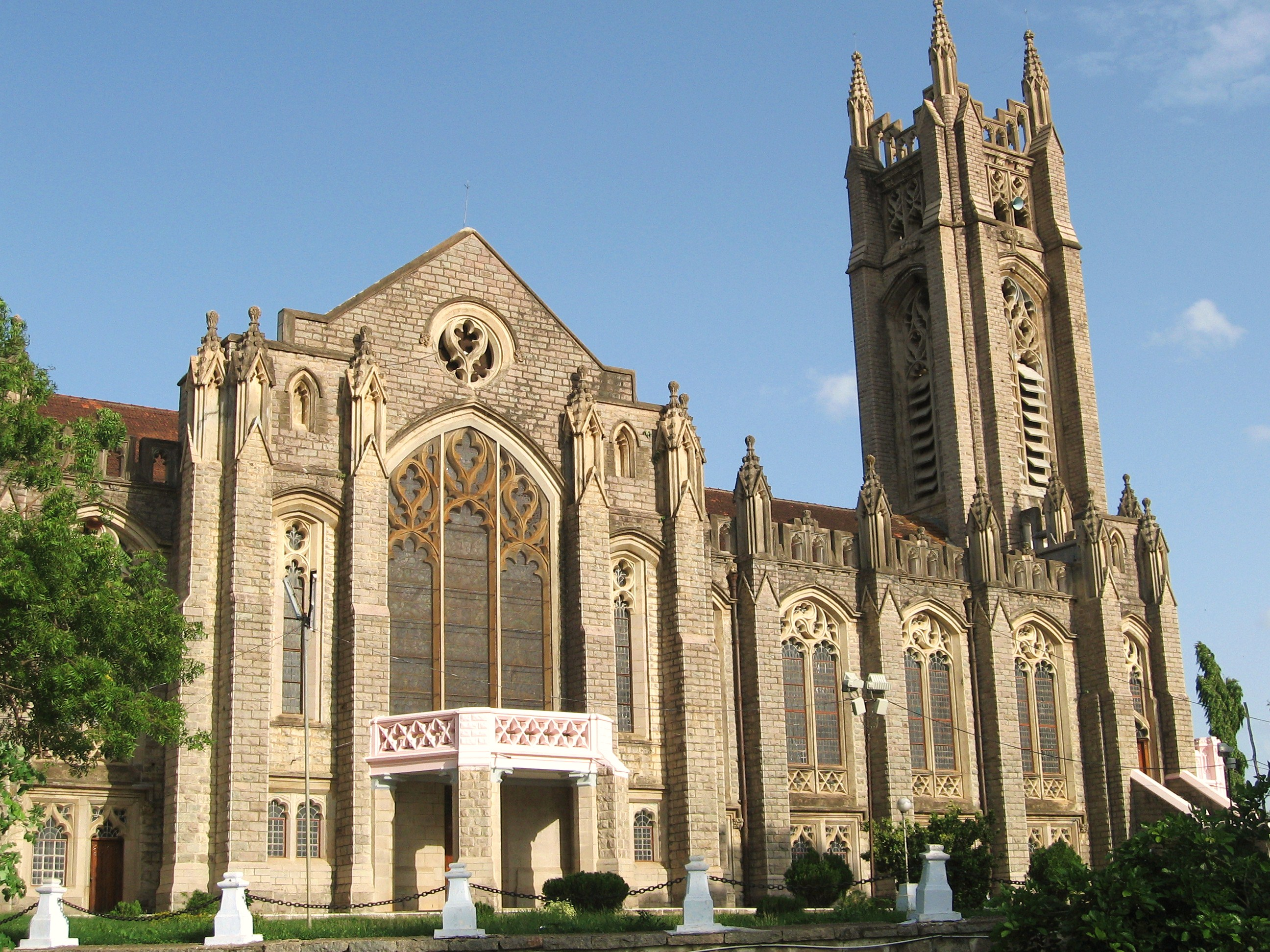
The CSI-Medak Cathedral, Medak where Yesurathnam was ordained in 1967 by Bishop Eber Priestley, Bishop - in - Medak.

Yesurathnam was ordained in 1967 by Priestley, then Bishop-in-Medak, and was assigned ministerial functions in the parishes falling under the ecclesiastical jurisdiction of the Diocese of Medak and served in Sangareddy and other towns shepherding congregations for nearly a decade until he was recalled in 1974 by then Bishop, H. D. L. Abraham, and reassigned the role of a Spiritual Formator.

In 1992, when Victor Premasagar vacated the bishopric of Medak on attaining superannuation, the ensuing Sede vacante was contested among whom Yesurathnam stood in the fray for the vacant bishopric, which was overseen by Ryder Devapriam, then Moderator of the Church of South India Synod and a former colleague of Yesurathnam at the Protestant Regional Theologiate. However, the sudden death of Devapriam on 4 September 1992 while in Germany turned the tides for those in fray, resulting in the appointment and subsequent consecration of B. P. Sugandhar.

=== Teaching ===
The Andhra Christian Theological College (ACTC) relocated from Rajahmundry to Secunderabad. Yesurathnam was invited to join the college in 1974, during the Principalship of Victor Premasagar. In 1993 he was appointed guest professor at the Kirchliche Hochschule Wuppertal/Bethel in Germany, where he taught until 1994. He then returned to ACTC and was appointed principal under the institution's policy of rotating that office between the various constituent churches in four-year cycles.

Yesurathnam took a year's sabbatical leave in 1998 to the Overseas Ministries Study Center, New Haven, Connecticut, to continue his research pursuits and rejoined the Theologiate in Secunderabad to teach for two more years until 2001.

=== Missionary service ===
When the Council for World Mission (CWM) sought missionaries from the CSI, Yesurathnam moved to the International University of the Caribbean, Kingston, Jamaica, where he began his sojourn in the New millennium and served as a theological educator for nearly a decade until his death on 8 August 2011 at the Yashoda Hospitals, Hyderabad.

== Writings ==
Yesurathnam's works are available in nearly 35 research institutes, comprising seminaries, state universities and research academies across Asia, Australia, Europe, and North America.

- 1972, Pierre Teilhard de Chardin's concept of man and its relevance for a Christian interpretation of man in India
- 1987, The adequacy of the concept of Avatara for expounding the Christian doctrine of incarnation
- 1987, The Mythic Symbol Avatara in Indian Conceptual Formulations
- 1988, Religious Pluralism: Some Implications for the Mission of the Church
- 1990, Abhishiktānanda : An Indian Christian Theologian with a difference
- 1993, Contours of the emerging Indian Church: Problems and Possibilities
- 1998, Liberation from Jubilee Perspective
- 1999, Can the Clergy make it ?
- 1999, Book Review: Mission Today, Challenges and Responses
- 2000, Contextualizing in Mission
- 2001, Book Review: Relevant Patterns of Christian Witness in India: People as Agents of Mission
- 2001, Channels of Peace: A Theological Perspective
- 2003, The Cross of Christ as the Anchor of Hope in Suffering
- 2006, A Christian Dialogical Theology: The Contribution of Swami Abhishiktananda (Henri Le Saux)

Academic offices
Preceded by Waldo Penner, CBCNC, Ryder Devapriam, CSI	Teacher - in - Systematic Theology, Andhra Christian Theological College, Secunderabad; 1974-2001	Succeeded by B. J. Christie Kumar, STBC, G. Dyvasirvadam, CSI
Educational offices
Preceded by G. Sampurna Rao, AELC; 1993-1994	Principal, Andhra Christian Theological College, Secunderabad; 1994-1998	Succeeded by K. D. G. Prakasa Rao, CBCNC; 1998-2002
