= Social Analysis (journal) =

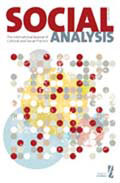
- Discipline: Anthropology
- Language: English
- Edited by: Judith Bovensiepen, Martin Holbraad, Hans Steinmüller

Publication details
- History: 1979–present
- Publisher: Berghahn Books
- Frequency: Quarterly

Standard abbreviations
- ISO 4: Soc. Anal.

Indexing
- ISSN: 0155-977X (print); 1558-5727 (web)

Links
- Journal homepage

Social Analysis: The International Journal of Anthropology is a peer-reviewed academic journal published by Berghahn Books covering the humanities and other social sciences. It presents contributions directed toward a critical and theoretical understanding of cultural, political, and social processes. Social Analysis is published four times a year and is edited by Anni Kajanus, Martin Holbraad and Hans Steinmüller.

== Indexing and abstracting ==
Social Analysis is indexed and abstracted in:

- Abstracts in Anthropology
- Anthropological Index
- Anthropological Literature
- British Humanities Index
- International Bibliography of Book Reviews of Scholarly Literature on the Humanities and Social Sciences
- International Bibliography of Periodical Literature
- International Political Science Abstracts
- Left Index
- Linguistics and Language Behavior Abstracts
- MLA International Bibliography
- Scopus
- Social Services Abstracts
- Sociological Abstracts
- Worldwide Political Science Abstracts
