= Krentzman =

Krentzman is a surname. Notable people with the surname include:

- Ben Krentzman (1914–1998), American judge
- Stewart Krentzman (born 1951), American businessman

== See also ==
- The Krentzman Quadrangle, at Northeastern University
