= Bheemavaram, Khammam district =

Bheemavaram
- Village
- Location in Telangana, India
- Coordinates: 17.1322°N 80.8175°E
- Country: India
- State: Telangana
- District: Khammam
- Mandal: Yerrupalem

Government
  - Type: Panchayati raj
  - Body: Bheemavaram gram panchayat

Area
  - Total: 27.67 km^{2} (10.68 sq mi)
- Elevation: 122 m (400 ft)

Population (2011)
  - Total: 2,623
  - Density: 94.80/km^{2} (245.5/sq mi)

Languages
  - Official: Telugu
- Time zone: UTC+5:30 (IST)

Bheemavaram is a village in Khammam district of the Indian state of Telangana. It is located in Yerrupalem mandal of Khammam revenue division.

== Geography ==
Bheemavaram is located at 17.1322°N 80.8175°E and at an altitude of 122 m (400 ft). The village is spread over an area of 27.67 km^{2} (10.68 sq mi).
