= K. Devasahayam =

Indian Lutheran clergyman

K. Devasahayam, AELC
- President
- Church: Christian
- See: Andhra Evangelical Lutheran Church (AELC)
- In office: 1965–1969
- Predecessor: G. Devasahayam
- Successor: S. W. Schmitthenner
- Previous posts: Lecturer, Andhra Christian Theological College

Orders
- Consecration: 1965

Personal details
- Born: 5 June 1916 Pedakakani, Andhra Pradesh
- Died: 30 January 1992 (aged 75) Guntur, Andhra Pradesh

K. Devasahayam (Telugu: దేవసహాయము అయ్యగారు; 5 June 1916 – 30 January 1992) was President of the Andhra Evangelical Lutheran Church from 1965 to 1969.

== Early years ==
K. Devasahayam was born in Pedakakani in Guntur district, Andhra Pradesh, India on 5 June 1916.

== Divinity and Priesthood ==
The Church Historian, K. L. Richardson mentioned that K. Devasahayam was sent to the Lutheran Theological Seminary at Philadelphia for theological studies between 1956 and 1960.

As a Priest of the Andhra Evangelical Lutheran Church, Devasahayam served in pastoral roles in Rajahmundry, Narasaraopeta, Mangalagiri, and Eluru parishes.

== Theological writings ==
R. Joseph and B. Suneel Bhanu who compiled a bibliography of original Christian writings in India in Telugu included a book by K. Devasahayam entitled The Good News of the Cross first published in 1962.

== Academic ==
K. Devasahayam was a member of the Church History Association of India, incorporating Church Historians of the Protestant, Eastern Orthodox, Catholic and Charismatic traditions. Devasahayam is acknowledged to have researched into the new age charismatic movements in Christianity in Andhra Pradesh.

=== Rajahmundry ===
K. Devasahayam began teaching Church History at the Lutheran Theological College from 1944 to 1947. For sometime, Devasahayam was Secretary of Andhra Pradesh unit of the Student Christian Movement of India. He rejoined the Lutheran Theological College and saw the closure of the college along with century-old Seminaries in Kakinada, Dornakal, and Ramayapatnam. The Andhra Christian Theological College, a special purpose entity was formed in 1964 taking in all the faculty and students of the closed-down Seminaries.

=== Serampore ===
In the middle of the academic year 1970–1971, K. Devasahayam was deputed by his Church Society to the historical Serampore College, Serampore, West Bengal where he taught Church History and New Testament. K. Devasahayam was made Rector of the Theology Department the same year in place of M. P. John who left for the Bible Society of India. In July 1974, the Council of Serampore College granted study leave to Devasahayam who went for doctoral studies (D.D.) to his alma mater, the Lutheran Theological Seminary at Philadelphia, and returned to Serampore College in the academic year 1976–1977 to take up his teaching responsibilities and Rectorship of the Theology Department. After having served over seven years in the college, Devasahayam resigned in July 1977.

== Presidentship ==
While teaching Church History at the Andhra Christian Theological College, a newly formed ecumenical seminary in Rajahmundry, Devasahayam contested for the Presidency of the Andhra Evangelical Lutheran Church Society headquartered in Guntur and was elected in 1965 and was in office till 1969.

Religious titles
| Preceded by G. Devasahayam | President, Andhra Evangelical Lutheran Church; 1965–1969 | Succeeded by S. W. Schmitthenner |
