= Muriel Spurgeon Carder =

Canadian Baptist minister (1922–2023)

The Reverend Doctor Muriel Spurgeon-Carder, CBM Member, Society for Biblical Studies in India and Studiorum Novi Testamenti Societas
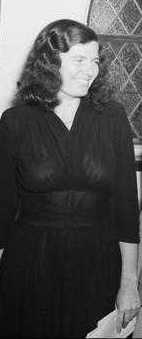
- Born: November 1, 1922; Woodford Green, England
- Died: June 14, 2023 (aged 100); Woodstock, Ontario, Canada
- Other name: Carder Ammagaru
- Education: B.A. (McMaster), B.D. (McMaster), S.T.M. (Union), Th.D. (Toronto)
- Alma mater: McMaster University, Hamilton, Ontario, Canada, Union Theological Seminary, New York City, United States, Toronto School of Theology, Toronto, Ontario, Canada
- Occupation: Priesthood
- Years active: 1947-2023 (76 years)
- Known for: New Testament scholarship
- Parent(s): Mother: Elizabeth Frances (Keeley); Father: Carey Bradford Spurgeon
- Religion: Christianity
- Church: Canadian Baptist Ministries, Canada
- Ordained: 16 September 1947
- Writings: Jeevie, an Indian Boy; A Caesarean Text in the Catholic Epistles; The Biblical Concept of Sin in Translation
- Offices held: Professor of New Testament, Theology and Ethics: Ramayapatnam Baptist Theological Seminary, Rajahmundry (B.D. section) (1967-1972); Andhra Christian Theological College, Rajahmundry/Secunderabad (1969-1976); McMaster Divinity College, Hamilton, Ontario (1992-2015)(1992-2015)(1992-2015)(1992-2015) Chaplain: Nurses Chapel, King George Hospital, Visakhapatnam D'Arcy Place Developmental Centre, Cobourg Oxford Regional Centre, Woodstock General Hospital

Muriel Spurgeon Carder (November 1, 1922 – June 14, 2023) was a Canadian Baptist who was the first woman ordained as a Baptist minister in Ontario and Quebec; she was also a missionary in India.

== Life ==
=== Childhood and studies ===
Muriel Spurgeon was born in Woodford Green, England to Elizabeth Frances (Keeley) and Carey Bradford Spurgeon (December 13, 1892 – March 2, 1968). Carder is related to Charles Spurgeon, a Reformed Baptist minister, and had a brother named David. Her mother, Elizabeth Frances (Keeley), died in 1953. Her father was born in India to the Reverend Robert Spurgeon. He was a fellow of the Institute of Actuaries and an associate of the Society of Actuaries; he was also on a tour of duty in the Battle of Vimy Ridge.

Carder enrolled at the McMaster University in Hamilton, Ontario, where she received a Bachelor of Arts degree in 1944 and a Bachelor of Divinity (B. D.) degree in 1947. The Baptist Convention of Ontario and Quebec ordained her the same year. The ceremony took place on September 16 at the King Street Baptist Church in Cambridge, Ontario. Carder was the first woman to receive a B. D. degree from McMaster University, and the first woman to be ordained as Baptist minister in Ontario and Quebec.

=== Missionary work and teaching in India ===
Carder took up evangelism, and was sent to India as a representative of the Canadian Baptist Mission serving in schools and hospitals. She was also associated with the leprosy mission in India. Carder's work in the country mirrored the efforts of her paternal grandfather who also did missionary work in India. She returned to Canada and taught for a year at McMaster Divinity College from 1956 to 1957. From 1957 to 1958 she pursued postgraduate studies at Union Theological Seminary (New York), obtaining a Master of Sacred Theology (S.T.M.) degree. During the academic year 1965–1966, she again taught New Testament and Greek at McMaster Divinity College.

Carder began teaching the New Testament and Theology and Ethics from 1967 to 1969 in Rajahmundry, where the B.D. section of the Ramayapatnam Baptist Theological Seminary is today located on the campus of Andhra Christian Theological College. Soon after the merger of the Ramayapatnam Baptist Theological Seminary with Andhra Christian Theological College in 1969, the campus moved to Secunderabad; Carder followed, and continued teaching there until 1976. At that time Carder enrolled as a doctoral candidate at the Toronto School of Theology and was awarded a Th.D. in 1969, based on her thesis entitled An Inquiry into the Textual Transmission of the Catholic Epistles.

=== Retirement and chaplaincy ===
Soon after Carder retired in 1976, she returned to Canada and began serving as a chaplain. She first served as an intern at the Hamilton Psychiatric Hospital and Toronto General Hospital before becoming chaplain at the D'Arcy Place Developmental Centre in Cobourg and, later, at Oxford Regional Centre of Woodstock General Hospital. In 1984, Carder was certified as a clinical pastoral education supervisor.

=== Death ===
Carder died in Woodstock, Ontario on June 14, 2023, at the age of 100.

== Publications ==
Articles

- A Caesarean Text in the Catholic Epistles? New Testament Studies, 1970.
- The Biblical Concept of Sin in Translation. Indian Journal of Theology, 1971.
- Spiritual and Religious Needs of Mentally Retarded Persons. Journal of Pastoral Care, Volume 38, Number 2, June, 1984.
- Journey into understanding mentally retarded people's experiences around death. Journal of Pastoral Care, Volume 41, Number 1, 1987, pp. 18–31.

Translations

When the Andhra Pradesh Auxiliary of the Bible Society of India began a Telugu New Testament translation, Carder served as a panel member on the Translations Committee with P. Dass Babu, A. B. Masilamani, K. David and Victor Premasagar. She has translated a Greek grammar text and the Didache into Telugu.

== Awards and affiliations ==
In 2007, Carder received the Katharine Hockin Award for Global Mission and Ministry from the Canadian Churches' Forum for Global Ministries, Toronto, in recognition of her missionary service in India. The citation also noted that her ordained status was a contributing factor to the later ordination of women in the Church of South India.

Carder was a member of the Society for Biblical Studies in India and the Studiorum Novi Testamenti Societas.

== Student's reminiscence ==
Talathoti Punnaiah who studied a three-year theology course leading to Bachelor of Theology at the Andhra Christian Theological College, both at Rajahmundry and at Hyderabad from 1970 to 1973 recalls his association with Muriel Carder,

Muriel was my Ethics and Greek Professor. Because of her constant encouragement, I could do my Greek paper in the third year. She used to speak very good Telugu language. She encouraged me to lead worship through chanting. She was a Canadian Baptist Mission Missionary and good in teaching and preaching.

Awards
Preceded by Sr. Frances Brady	Katharine Hockin Award for Global Mission and Ministry awarded by the Canadian Churches' Forum for Global Ministries, Toronto; 2007	Succeeded by
Academic offices
Preceded by Komaravalli David, CBCNC; 1965-1987	Teacher - in - New Testament, Andhra Christian Theological College, Rajahmundry (Andhra Pradesh)/Secunderabad, Telangana; 1967-1980	Succeeded by M. Victor Paul, AELC, 1969-2000; Suppogu Joseph, STBC, 1969-2002
