= S. W. Schmitthenner =

Indian Lutheran pastor

Samuel William Schmitthenner, AELC
- The Reverend
- Church: Lutheran
- Diocese: Synods of East Godavari, West Godavari, East Guntur, West Guntur, Central Guntur
- See: Andhra Evangelical Lutheran Church (AELC)
- In office: 1969–1981
- Predecessor: K. Devasahayam
- Successor: K. Nathaniel
- Previous posts: Pastor, Andhra Evangelical Lutheran Church Society

Orders
- Ordination: May 23, 1951 by Central Pennsylvania Synod, United Lutheran Church in America

Personal details
- Born: February 23, 1928 Rajahmundry, Andhra Pradesh, India
- Died: May 17, 2015 Gettysburg, Pennsylvania, United States

Samuel William Schmitthenner (February 23, 1928 – May 17, 2015) was a Lutheran pastor who served as the President of the Protestant Andhra Evangelical Lutheran Church Society in Guntur district, Andhra Pradesh, India from 1969 to 1981.

== Early life ==
His parents, Marian and August Schmitthenner missionaries were in Rajahmundry, India.

== Studies ==
S. W. Schmitthenner studied at the Kodaikanal International School in Tamil Nadu and in 1944 moved on to Gettysburg College, Gettysburg, Pennsylvania, where he earned a graduate degree in 1948. He continued his studies and earned a Master of Divinity (M. Div.) degree from the Lutheran Theological Seminary at Gettysburg in 1951.

Gettysburg College honored him with an honorary D.D. in 1977; in 2013, the Kodaikanal International School awarded him the Margaret Eddy Award in honor of his service to the school.

== Career ==
S. W. Schmitthenner initially served as a missionary to India from 1952 onwards. He worked as a pastor of the Andhra Evangelical Lutheran Church Society in Andhra Pradesh, India. During his time in India, Schmitthenner returned twice to America to upgrade his academics. In 1958-1959 he attended the Kennedy School of Missions at Hartford, Connecticut, and again in 1966 he joined the University of Pennsylvania for studying Indian Sociology.

He returned to the US in 1982 and was the pastor of Faith United Lutheran Parish in Claysburg, Pennsylvania, from that time until 1991.

== Family life ==
In 1950, he married his school sweetheart, Ruth Gosselink; Ruth died in 1996 and a year later, he married Barbara Kolumban.

== Contribution ==
Religious titles
Preceded by K. Devasahayam; 1965–1969	President; Andhra Evangelical Lutheran Church; 1969–1981	Succeeded by K. Nathaniel; 1981–1989
Honorary titles
Preceded by M. Elia Peter, MCI, 1975-1977	Chairperson, Board of Governors, Andhra Christian Theological College, Hyderabad; 1977-1979	Succeeded by B. Victor Emmanuel, STBC, 1980-1982
