= William D. Coleman (pastor) =

Indian academic (1915–2001)

The Reverend Doctor W. D. Coleman, AELC
- Born: William Dawson Coleman; November 26, 1915; Rajahmundry, Andhra Pradesh (India)
- Died: October 22, 2001 (aged 85); Colebrook, Pennsylvania (United States of America)
- Other name: Coleman Ayyagaru
- Citizenship: American
- Education: Kodaikanal International School; Muhlenberg (B.A.); LTSP (B.D., S.T.M.); Yale Divinity School; Hartford (Ph.D.)
- Occupation: Priest
- Years active: 1938-2001 (44 years)
- Parent(s): Smt. Edith May Shoop and The Rev. Frederick Leroy Coleman, ELCA
- Religion: Christianity
- Church: Andhra Evangelical Lutheran Church (AELC)
- Ordained: 1939 at Lancaster, Pennsylvania
- Writings: 1948, The Doctrine of Incarnation in Hinduism and Christianity, 1958, The Development of the Indigenous Church in the Andhra Area in India on the Background of Hinduism
- Congregations served: Bheemavaram and Narsapur
- Offices held: Development Consultant; Bheemavaram and Narsapur Fields (1941-1946), East Godavari Synod (1948-1953), Principal; STBC-Ramayapatnam Baptist Theological College, Rajahmundry (1967-1972), Andhra Christian Theological College, Rajahmundry/Hyderabad (1964-1973); SALC/AELC-Lutheran Theological College, Rajahmundry (1962-1964)
- Title: The Reverend Doctor

William D. Coleman (November 26, 1915 - October 22, 2001) was the first Principal of the Andhra Christian Theological College, Hyderabad. Coleman was born in India in Rajahmundry, Andhra Pradesh.

When four theological colleges came together to start Andhra Christian Theological College in Rajahmundry, William D. Coleman was installed as the Principal of the College in 1964.

The Andhra Christian Theological College comprised faculty from four previous entities:

- Andhra Union Theological Seminary, Dornakal
- Baptist Theological Seminary, Kakinada
- Lutheran Theological College, Rajahmundry
- Ramayapatnam Baptist Theological Seminary, Ramayapatnam

W. D. Coleman worked in an ecumenical environment together with Baptists, Lutherans, Anglicans, and Wesleyans. It was Coleman who supervised the relocation of the College from Rajahmundry to Hyderabad as well as establishing the new campus in Hyderabad, especially during the Licence Raj.

== Studies ==
=== Scholastic and collegiate ===
Coleman studied up to twelfth standard at the Kodaikanal International School, Dundigal in Tamil Nadu (India) and proceeded to the United States where he pursued a graduate degree in arts at the Muhlenberg College, Allentown in Pennsylvania from where he obtained a B.A. in 1936.

=== Graduate and postgraduate ===
In fall 1936, Coleman enrolled at the Lutheran Theological Seminary at Philadelphia in Philadelphia for a graduate course in spirituality leading to B.D. Coleman studied at the seminary during the Registrarship of The Rev. Frederic Whipp Friday and completed his studies by 1939 and was ordained the same year and returned to India for Christian mission service.

During 1946-1948, Coleman went to the United States where he again enrolled at his alma mater, the Lutheran Theological Seminary at Philadelphia and submitted a dissertation fulfilling the requirements for the Bachelor of Divinity course based on which the seminary awarded him a B.D. degree in 1947.

In fall 1946, Coleman enrolled for a postgraduation course leading to S.T.M. at the Lutheran Theological Seminary at Philadelphia where he spent two semesters studying under Frederick Nolde, Roswell P. Barnes, Henry Smith Leiper, Franklin Clark Fry, and other faculty. Coleman also attended two additional seminars in 1947-1948 and was able to submit a dissertation entitled The Doctrine of Incarnation in Hinduism and Christianity based on which the seminary awarded him with an S.T.M. degree in 1948.

=== Doctoral ===
During 1953-1954, Coleman pursued doctoral studies at the Yale Divinity School and the Hartford Seminary, Hartford, Connecticut where he wrote a thesis titled, The Development of the Indigenous Church in the Andhra Area in India on the Background of Hinduism, leading to the award of Ph.D. by the Hartford Seminary.

== Ecclesiastical ministry ==
After initial theological studies in the United States, Coleman returned to India in 1939 and began serving as Missionary of the Andhra Evangelical Lutheran Church.

=== Pastoral ===
After Coleman returned to India in 1940, he was given the role of District Missionary in Bheemavaram and Narsapur Fields of the Andhra Evangelical Lutheran Church which he served from 1941-1946. After a two-year gap, Coleman was assigned as Evangelistic Missionary in the East Godavari Synod during 1948-1953.

=== Spiritual Formator ===
==== 1952-1964 ====
In 1952, Coleman was taken on the teaching staff of the Lutheran Theological College in Rajahmundry and also continued his role as an Evangelistic Missionary in the East Godavari Synod up to 1953. Coleman taught for more than a decade from 1952-1964 and also became Principal of the Lutheran Theological College in 1962.

==== 1964-1981 ====
When ecumenical efforts fructified resulting in the formation of the Andhra Christian Theological College in 1964 in the erstwhile premises of the Lutheran Theological College, Coleman was chosen as the Principal of the College, a position in which he continued up to 1973 in Rajahmundry.

In 1973, when the College was relocated to Hyderabad, Coleman continued to teach at the College and was Dean of External Studies from 1974-1981.

== Retirement and death ==
Coleman resigned from the College in 1981 and took up a role with the Division of World Mission and Ecumenism of the Evangelical Lutheran Church in America and was stationed in New York during 1981-1982. After serving for a year, Coleman retired from the Evangelical Lutheran Church in America.

After leading a retired life for nearly 18 years', Coleman died on 22 October 2001 at Colebrook, Pennsylvania (United States of America).

== Reminisce ==
Talathoti Punnaiah who studied a 3-year theology course leading to Bachelor of Theology at the Andhra Christian Theological College, both at Rajahmundry and at Hyderabad from 1970-1973 recalls his association with W. D. Coleman,

Coleman was a Lutheran missionary who was born and raised in Andhra Pradesh. He was our Principal and used to speak Telugu very fluently. He was our Old Testament Professor and a very good Administrator. He was strict in his dealings. I noticed several administrative skills in him such as work abilities, promptness and activeness. The entire faculty used to respect him and cooperate with him in the administration of the Seminary. He was well versed in Old Testament and a good preacher.

Academic offices
Preceded by Louis F. Knoll, STBC	Principal, STBC-Ramayapatnam Baptist Theological College, Rajahmundry, Andhra Pradesh; 1967 - 1972	Succeeded by B. R. Moses, STBC
Preceded by Post created	Principal, Andhra Christian Theological College, Rajahmundry, Andhra Pradesh/ Secunderabad, Telangana; 1964 - 1973	Succeeded by Victor Premasagar, CSI
Preceded by A. N. Gopal, AELC	Principal, SALC/AELC-Lutheran Theological College, Rajahmundry, Andhra Pradesh; 1962 - 1964	Succeeded by G. Emmanuel, AELC
