= Methodist Church in India =

Protestant Christian denomination of India

- Classification: Methodist
- Theology: Wesleyan-Arminian
- Polity: Episcopal
- Associations: World Council of Churches, Christian Conference of Asia, the National Council of Churches in India and World Methodist Council
- Congregations: 2,460
- Members: 648,000
- Official website: https://worldmethodistcouncil.org

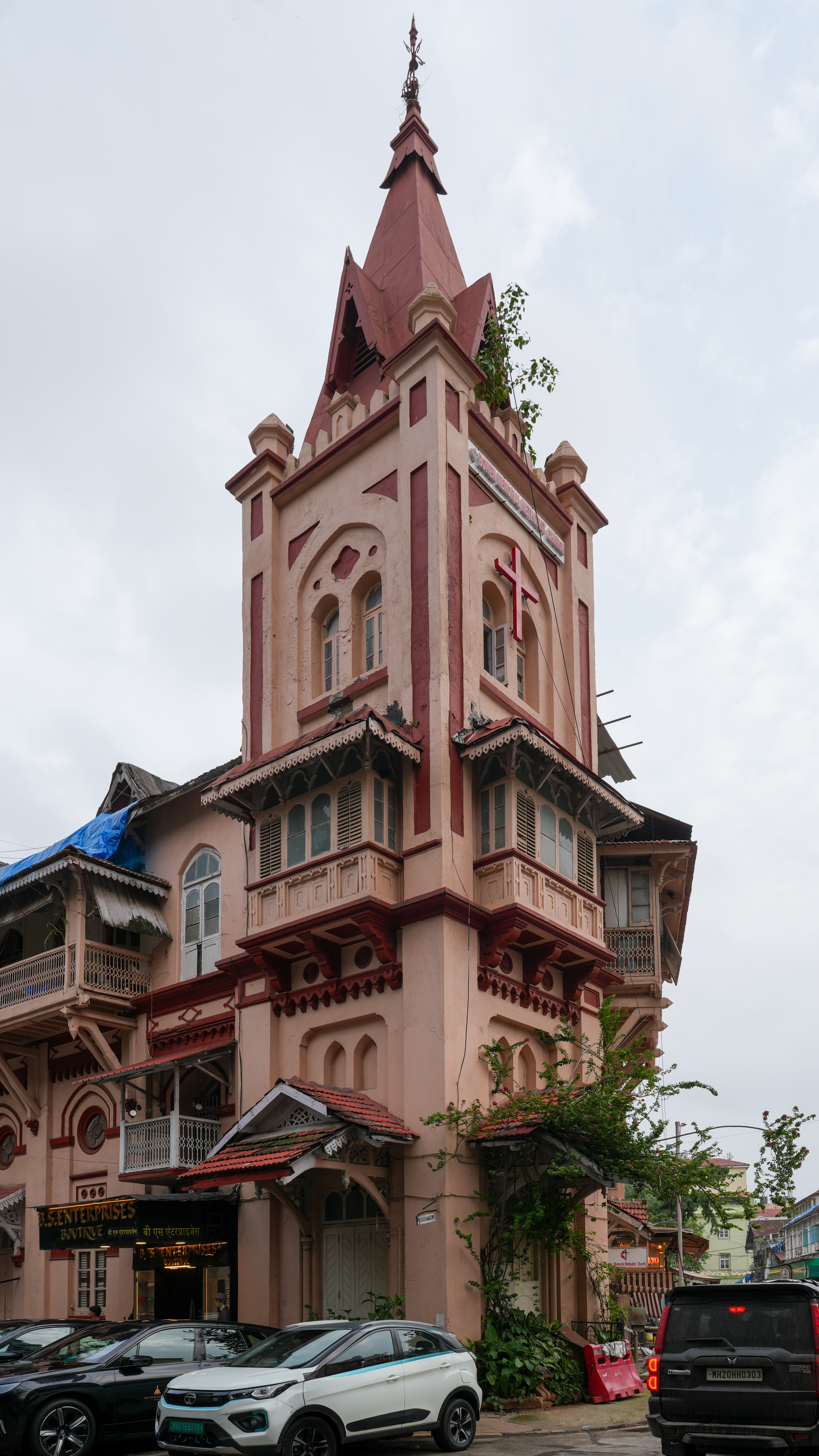
Bowen Memorial Methodist Church in Colaba, Mumbai (built 1889)

Methodist Church in India is a Protestant Christian denomination of India.

The Methodist Church in India's roots originate in American Methodist missionary activity in India, as opposed to the British and Australian conferences of the Methodist churches, which joined the Church of South India and the Church of North India that emerged as a result of the ecumenical merger of the Methodist Church of Great Britain, Church of India, Burma and Ceylon (Anglican) and other Protestant denominations.

Methodism came to India in 1856. It has hundreds of thousands of members. It is a member of the World Council of Churches, Christian Conference of Asia, the National Council of Churches in India and World Methodist Council. It runs schools.

The Methodist Church in India (MCI), is an "autonomous affiliated" Church in relation to the United Methodist Church.

It has episcopal polity.

== History ==
In 1856 the Methodist Episcopal Church From America started the mission in India. The Methodist Episcopal Church began its work in India in 1856, when William Butler came from America. He selected Oudh and Rohilkhand to work in and, being unable to secure a residence at Lucknow, began work at Bareilly. The first War of Independence broke up the work at Bareilly, but in 1858 Lucknow was occupied and Bareilly re-occupied and the work of the Mission started anew.

By 1864 the work had grown to such an extent that it was organized under the name of the India Mission Conference. Additional stations were occupied in Oudh, Rohilkhand, Garhwal, and Kumaon, and by 1876 The Methodist Episcopal Church had established work both along evangelistic and educational lines.

Methodist churches were established in cities including Mumbai, Kolkata, Chennai, Kanpur and Bangalore. Special revival meetings were held which led the church out of its boundaries and gave it a national status.

In 1870 marked, on the invitation of James M. Thoburn, an acknowledged leader in the Mission, evangelist William Taylor was invited to India to hold special revival meetings. On his arrival, he started his work at Lucknow and subsequently went to Kanpur. The work had thus far been confined to the territory East and North of the Ganges, but by that river; this move was the first step of expansion into all Southern Asia. There came into existence Methodist congregations in Kanpur, Bombay, Poona, Calcutta, Secunderabad, Madras, Bangalore, Nagpur and other cities.

In 1873 the churches established by William Taylor were organized into the "Bombay-Bengal Mission." In 1876 the South India Annual Conference was organized, taking in all the territory outside the bounds of the original Upper India field. This was followed in 1888 by the organization of the Bengal Annual Conference, and in 1893 the Bombay and North-West India Annual Conferences were separated. Between 1871 and 1900 the Methodist Episcopal Church expanded to become a national Church throughout Southern and South-Eastern Asia, with work carried on in twelve languages, extending from Manila to Quetta and from Lahore to Madras; and the Christian community increased from 1,835 to 111,654.

In 1904 the field was again sub-divided by the organization of the Central Provinces Mission Conference, which was followed by setting the work of Burma apart and organizing it as a Mission Conference. In 1921 two Annual Conferences, Lucknow and Gujarat were brought into existence and another division of the field was made in 1922 when the Indus River Annual Conference was organized. In 1925 the Hyderabad Annual Conference was separated from the South India Annual Conference. In 1956 Agra Annual Conference was separated from Delhi Annual Conference and Moradabad Annual Conference from the North India Annual Conference. In 1960 the Karachi Provisional Annual Conference was organized. Thus in 95 years from 1865 to 1960, the one Conference in India had grown into 13, covering the whole of Southern Asia.

In this period the work of the Methodist Episcopal Church spread beyond India. Under the leadership of James M. Thoburn, Burma was entered in 1879, where John E. Robinson became the pioneer missionary, and in 1885 the work in Malaysia was begun by the establishment of a mission at Singapore, the pioneer here being William F. Oldham. In 1899, when the Philippines came into the possession of the United States of America, James M. Thoburn entered Manila and established the Church; Homer C. Stuntz was one of the pioneer workers. All these missionary leaders later became Bishops of the Church. In 1870 the first missionaries of the Woman's Foreign Missionary Society of the Methodist Episcopal Church came. Two young ladies arrived that year: Isabella Thoburn, to work in the education of India's girls and women, and physician Clara Swain, to work in medicine, the first female doctor to undertake such work in Asia.

Evangelistic work in the villages of northern India resulted in the baptism of large numbers of people from the deprived classes.

In 1920 the Methodist Missionary Society was organized to supervise missionary work in India. In 1930 the Central Conference of southern Asia elected the first national bishop. Since the Independence of India in 1947 all bishops have been Indian nationals. Missionaries were sent to Borneo in 1956 and to the Fiji islands in 1963.

Since 1928 the MCI was engaged in union negotiations in North India. In 1970 the Central Conference voted against the plan of union, but dialogue with the Church of North India continued.

In 1981 the Methodist Church in India was established as an "autonomous affiliated" church in relation with the United Methodist Church. The church is now independent in organization and has adopted its own constitution and book of discipline and articles of faith.

== Beliefs ==
The Methodist Church in India says that it understands itself as the body of Christ in and for the world as part of the Church universal. Its stated purpose is to understand the love of God as revealed in Jesus Christ, to bear witness of this love to all people and to make them his disciples.

The Methodist Church in India affirms two dominical sacraments, Holy Baptism and Holy Communion, with five additional rites being observed: confirmation, confession, matrimony, holy orders and anointing of the sick. The ordinances of feetwashing (especially on Maundy Thursday), as well as women's headcovering (usually with a shawl, chiefly a dupatta), are practiced.

== Social work ==
The MCI runs 102 boarding schools and 155 village schools in which over 60,000 children are enrolled. 89 residential hostels cater for 6,540 boys and girls. The church also operates 19 College and vocational training institutions, 25 hospitals and health care centres, and many community welfare and development programmes in the country.

== Chennai Regional Conference ==
Chennai

1. Emmanuel Methodist Church, Vepery, Chennai
2. Methodist Tamil Church, Vepery, Chennai
3. Anna Nagar Methodist Church, Anna Nagar, Chennai # annanagarmethodistchurch.org.in
4. Methodist Tamil Church, Ramapuram, Chennai
5. Christ Methodist Church, Manali New Town, Chennai

Andaman Islands

1. Holy Trinity Methodist Church, Haddo, Andaman Islands
2. Methodist Tamil Church, Shoal Bay, Andaman Islands
3. Methodist Tamil Church, Bamboo Flat, Andaman Islands
4. Methodist Tamil Church, Namunaghar, Andaman Islands

Pondicherry

1. Zion Methodist Church, Pondicherry
2. Emmanuel Methodist Church, Pondicherry

Madurai

1. St. John's Methodist Tamil Church Madurai

Coimbatore

1. Apostolic Methodist Church, Coimbatore

Thiruvallur District

1. Emmanuel methodist Tamil Church, Pudur, Ambattur, Chennai

== Bangalore Regional Conference ==
1. Richmond Town Methodist Church, No.4, Kingston Road, Richmond Town, Bengaluru, Karnataka 560025
2. Indiranagar Methodist Church, 100 ft Road, 13th Main, HAL 2nd Stage, Indiranagar, Bengaluru, Karnataka 560008
3. Sarjapur Road Methodist Church, beside St. Patrick's Academy, near Kodathi, Gate, Bengaluru, Karnataka 560035
4. Koramangala Methodist Church, CA30/A, 15th Main Rd, 4th Block Koramangala, Bengaluru, Karnataka 560034
5. Christ Methodist Church, 3M98+CGR, Sonam Layout, Essel gardens, Bengaluru
6. Hosa Road Methodist church
7. Lingarajapuram Methodist church
8. Wilson Garden Methodist church
9. R T Nagar Methodist church
10. Grace Methodist church
11. St. Paul Methodist church
12. Hoodi Methodist church
13. Peenya Methodist church
14. L R Nagar Methodist church
15. Mysore Methodist church
16. St. Paul Methodist Central Church Bidar Karnataka 585401

== Mumbai Regional Conference ==
S. No.	Name	Address
1	St. Paul's Methodist Tamil Church, Aarey Colony	Unit No 7, Film City Rd, near Power House, Workers Colony, Aarey Milk Colony, Goregaon East, Mumbai, Maharashtra 400065
2	Wesley Methodist Tamil Church, Andheri	Worlipada Anand Nagar, Marol Pipeline Rd, Andheri East, Mumbai
3	Centenary Methodist Gujarati Church	M.S Ali road, Grant Road east, Mumbai.
4	Methodist Tamil Church, Mira Road	Shanti Nagar, Mira Road (E), Mumbai/Thane.
5	Bowen Memorial Methodist Church	Tullock Road, Apollo Bandar, Colaba, Mumbai.
6	Robinson Memorial Methodist Central Church	Shaikh Hafizuddin Marg, Ashadham Colony, Madanpura, Mumbai.
7	Rahator Memorial Methodist Church	Parel, Mumbai.
8	Warner Memorial Methodist Church	Ambedkar Nagar, Kurla, Mumbai.
9	Vernon Memorial Methodist Church	Syndicate, Kalyan, Mumbai.
10	Sumang Methodist Kannada Church	Vithalwadi, Kalyan East, Mumbai.
11	Methodist Marathi Church Thane	Gokuldham Society, Thane East
12	Bethel Kannada Methodist Church Matunga	Matunga M.L Camp, Matunga
13	Methodist Church Ambernath	kalyan-badlapur road, Ambernath
14	St. Paul's Methodist Tamil Church Kurla East	Kamgar Nagar, Kurla East
15	Methodist English Church Kirkee Pune	Elphinstone Road, Kirkee Pune
16	Methodist Marathi Church Kirkee Pune	Elphinstone Road, Kirkee Pune
17	Methodist Tamil Church Kirkee Pune	Elphinstone Road, Kirkee Pune
18	Methodist Kannada Church Kirkee Pune	Elphinstone Road, Kirkee Pune
19	Oldham Memorial Methodist English Church	East Street, Camp, Pune
20	Oldham Memorial Methodist Marathi Church	East Street, Camp, Pune
21	Oldham Memorial Methodist Kannada Church	East Street, Camp, Pune
22	Methodist Marathi Church	12 Bungalow Road, Lonavala Pune
23	Methodist Marathi Centenary Church	Talegaon Station Road, Pune
24	Methodist Marathi Church	Talegaon Gaon, Pune
25	Methodist Hindustani Church	NDA, Pune
26	Elim Methodist Marathi Church	Nigdi, Pune
27	Tamil Church Elim Methodist	Nigdi, Pune
28	Elim Methodist Kannada Church	Nigdi, Pune
29	St.Peter's Methodist Tamil Church	Kailash Nagar, Thane
30	Epworth Methodist Tamil Church	Nerul, Navi Mumbai
31	The Epworth Methodist English Church	Nerul, Navi Mumbai

=== Nagpur (Maharashtra) ===
S. No.	Name	Address
1	Methodist Hindi Church	Mecosabagh Methodist High School, Mecosabagh Christian Colony, Kadbi Chowk - 440014
2	Methodist Marathi Church	Nelson Hall, Mecosabagh Christian Colony, Kadbi Chowk - 440014

=== Nanded District (Maharashtra) ===
S. No.	Name	Address
1	Nanded Methodist Church	Methodist Church Near SP office Nanded police headquarter road, Vazirabad, Nanded-431601

== North India Regional Conference ==
Bareilly served as the headquarters for the Methodist Church in India, hence, the Christ Methodist Church in Civil Lines, Bareilly is the second oldest Methodist Church building in India. The oldest being in Nainital, Uttarakhand.

S. No.	Parish	Address
1	Christ Methodist Church	Church Road, Civil Lines, Bareilly 243001 - U.P.

== Delhi Regional Conference ==
S. No.	Parish	Address
1	Christ Church Trans Yamuna	Lalita Park, Laxmi Nagar, East Delhi, Delhi.
2	Christ Methodist Church	Bholanath Bazar, Shahdara, East Delhi, Delhi.
3	Bethel Methodist Church	Sector 50, Noida, UP 201301
4	Apostle's Methodist Church	Sector 4, RK Puram, New Delhi, Delhi 110022
5	Methodist Church Delhi Cantonment	Church Road, Birjlal Dua Marg, Pratap Chowk, Delhi Cantonment, New Delhi, Delhi 110010
6	Vasant Kunj Methodist Church	Pocket 11, Sector B, Vasant Kunj, New Delhi, Delhi 110070
7	Christ Methodist Church Khanpur	Block D, JJ Colony, Khanpur, New Delhi, Delhi 110062
8	Christ Methodist Church- New Palam Vihar	New Palam Vihar Phase 2, Sector 110, Gurugram, Haryana 122017
9	Centenary Methodist Church	Lodhi Road, New Delhi, Delhi 110003
10	Millennium Methodist Church	Sector 11, Rohini, Delhi, 110085
11	Emmanual Methodist Church	Near School, Block U, Mangolpuri S Block, Delhi, 110083
12	Christ Methodist Church-Najafgarh	Nangloi - Najafgarh Rd, Jatav Mohalla, Najafgarh, New Delhi, Delhi 110043
13	Methodist Church Dhaka	Dhaka Colony, Mukherjee Nagar, Delhi, 110009
14	Christ Methodist Church	1, Butler Rd, Railway Colony, Tis Hazari, New Delhi, Delhi 110054
15	Butler Methodist Church	Sector 19, Pocket 3, Dwarka, Delhi, 110075
16	Methodist Church-Burari-Sant Nagar	

=== Uttar Pradesh ===
S. No.	Parish	Address
1	St. Paul's Methodist Church	Roorkee Road, Meerut Cantt.
2	St. John's Church	Meerut.
3	St. Thomas Church	Baccha Park (Children's Park) Meerut
4	St. Methodist Church	G T Road, Ghaziabad.

== Lucknow Regional Conference ==
=== Lucknow ===
S. No.	Name	Address
1	Central Methodist Church	37 Cantonment road, Lucknow.
2	Lal Bagh Methodist Church	Foresyth Road, Near Dhayanidhan park, Lal Bagh, Lucknow.
3	Ganeshganj Methodist Church	Aminabad road, Lucknow.
4	Daliganj Methodist Church	Acharya narendradev Marg, Daliganj, Lucknow.
5	Shalom Methodist Church	Sector 4, Vrindavan colony, Lucknow.
6	Christ Methodist Church	Ram puram, Behind Gayatri Mandir, Kursi Road, Lucknow.
7	Wesleyan Methodist Church	28/29 Nehru Road, Cantt Lucknow.

=== Kanpur ===
S. No.	Name	Address
1	Methodist Church Chakeri	Harjinder Nagar, Chakeri, Kanpur.
2	LLJM Methodist Church	Post Office Lane, Civil Lines, Kanpur.
3	Methodist English Church	Noronha Road, Cantonment, Kanpur.
4	Methodist High School	73, Cantonments, Kanpur.
5	Sofi Shukla Memorial Methodist Church	Hamirpur Road, Baradevi, Kidwai Nagar, Kanpur.
6	Methodist Church	Varkitola, Phaphund.

== Gujarat Regional Conference ==
=== Gandhinagar (Gujarat) ===
S. No.	Name	Address
1	Methodist Church	Plot # 46, Sector 23, Gandhinagar - 382024.

=== Ahmedabad (Gujarat) ===
S. No.	Name	Address
1	Methodist Tamil Church	No.3 & 4 Anupam Nagar Society, Near Carmel Methodist Church, Near CTM, Ahmedabad.
2	Methodist Church Maninagar	Khokhra circle, Maninagar East, Khokhra, Ahmedabad, Gujarat 380008
3	Carmel Methodist Church CTM	A25, Gurukrupa School Rd, Manmandir Society, Hatkeshwar, Ahmedabad, Gujarat 380026
4	Shalom Methodist Church	Near Seth C L Hindi High School, Krishna Nagar, Rakhial, Ahmedabad, Gujarat 380021
5	Jaitun Jubilee Methdist Church	43, LH Rd, Soni ni chali, Virat Nagar, Odhav, Ahmedabad, Gujarat 382415
6	Shahpur Methodist Church	Makubhai Sheth Marg, Old City, Shahpur, Ahmedabad, Gujarat 380001
7	Sinai Methodist Church	Maheshwari Society 2, Vidhya Nagar, Odhav, Ahmedabad, Gujarat 382415
8	Methodist Church, Vatva	Samved residency,vinzol crossing road, vatva, Vinzol, Ahmedabad, Gujarat 382445
9	Sion Methidist Church	Sion Methodist Church, Sabarmati, Ahmedabad, Gujarat 380005
10	Bethani Jubilee Methodist Church	Haripura, Girdhar Nagar, Ahmedabad, Gujarat 380016, India
11	Aldersgate Methodist Church	Hathijan, Gujarat 382445, India
12	Agape Methodist Church, Maria park	Maria Pk Rd, Ranipur Patiya, Narolgam, Ahmedabad, Gujarat 382405, India
13	Amen Methodist Church	Oasis Apartment Commercial 2, OASIS APARTMENT, Indira Nagar I, Lambha, Ahmedabad, Gujarat 382405
14	Immanuel Jubilee Methodist Church	Rajpur Hirpur, Gomtipur, Ahmedabad, Gujarat 380021, India

== Madhya Pradesh Regional Conference ==
=== Bhopal (Madhya Pradesh) ===
S. No.	Name	Address
1	Centenary Methodist Church	Gehunkheda, Kolar Road, Bhopal - 462042
|Methodist Church Ayodhya Nagar	Ayodhya Nagar, Sector L, Bhopal - 462041	

== Bengal Regional Conference ==
Schools

1. Calcutta Boys' School

2. Calcutta Girls' School

3. Methodist School, Dankuni

Churches

1. Methodist Episcopal Church, Kolkata

2. Ushagram Methodist Church, Asansol

== See also ==
- Christianity in India
