= P. Solomon Raj =

The Reverend Doctor P. Solomon Raj, AELC
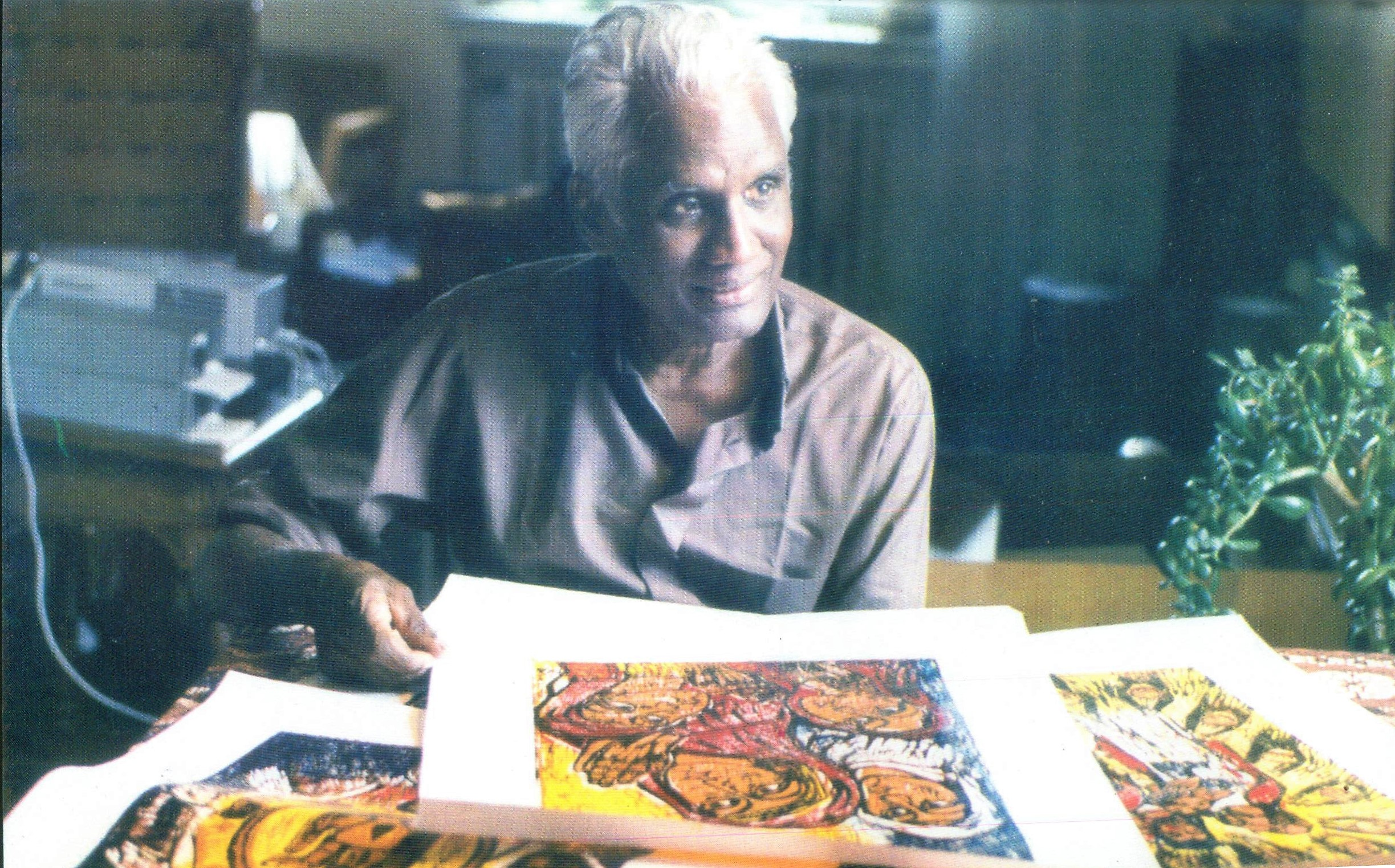
- Born: Pulidindi Solomon Raj; 21 February 1921; Neggipudi, West Godavari district (Andhra Pradesh, India)
- Died: 28 December 2019 (aged 98); Vijayawada, Krishna District (Andhra Pradesh, India)
- Education: B. Sc. (Andhra, 1945), B. Ed. (Andhra, 1947), B. D. (Serampore, 1956), M.S. (Indiana, 1965), Ph.D. (Birmingham, 1983)
- Alma mater: AELC-Andhra Christian College, Guntur (Andhra Pradesh), UELCI-Gurukul Lutheran Theological College, Chennai (Tamil Nadu), Indiana University Bloomington (United States), Selly Oak Colleges, Birmingham (England)
- Occupation: Pastor
- Years active: 1947 - 2019 (72 years)
- Known for: Christian art on Batik
- Religion: Christianity
- Church: Andhra Evangelical Lutheran Church Society
- Ordained: 1956
- Writings: See section
- Congregations served: Andhra Evangelical Lutheran Church Society
- Offices held: Director, Suvartha Vani, Vijayawada
- Title: The Reverend Doctor

P. Solomon Raj (21 February 1921 - 28 December 2019) was a pastor of Protestant Andhra Evangelical Lutheran Church Society headquartered in Guntur with major contribution to theological research and arts. Old Testament scholar Victor Premasagar wrote about Raj as a pastor, professor of communications, creative artist, sculptor, poet and a theological writer.

Church historian, K. L. Richardson of the Andhra Christian Theological College, Hyderabad, India, in Towards Self-Reliance: A historical survey of the programmes and efforts of Andhra Evangelical Lutheran Church from 1927 to 1969 has highlighted the contribution of Raj with special reference to Indian liturgy and music. Richardson writes,

(Adapted) During 1960s, Reverend P. Solomon Raju contributed very much to the AELC on indigenous methods through his writings, seminars and other special efforts. Many Christian plays, Burra kathas and Hari Kathas were written in Telugu by the distinguished writers and musicians including Solomon Raj.

Much like theologians of India believing in the Indian ethos akin to A. B. Masilamani, D. S. Amalorpavadass, Victor Premasagar, M. Victor Paul and others, Raj believes that it is only that form of Christianity, deeply etched in diverse cultures of India, that can influence Christianity in India. While A. B. Masilamani promoted Indian liturgy in the Christian Hymnal in Telugu, D. S. Amalorpavadass advocated for vernacular liturgy. Similarly, Victor Premasagar had recognised the contribution of indigenous movements. M. Victor Paul rooted for indigenous churches in place of institutionalized ones. It is in such a setting that Raj's contribution gains credence in the light of his doctoral dissertation on the Bible Mission Movement by Father Devadas which Roger E. Hedlund writes as,

Solomon Raj shows that the traditional mission-founded Churches are really Western appendages. This is true of the Lutherans and other traditional denominations including the Church of South India and the Church of North India. Solomon Raj predicts that movements such as this one (Bible Mission of Fr. Devadas) will have an ever increasing influence upon Christianity in India.

As an artist, Raj received global acclaim. Gudrun Löwner of the United Theological College, Bangalore has devoted a section in The Oxford Handbook of Christianity in Asia,

Still alive and creative is the Lutheran theologian and artist, Solomon Raj who uses batik and woodcuts, which use cheap materials that are readily available. He depicts Jesus amidst the refugees and suffering people. The artist's favourite story is John 4, where he shows the liberative message of Jesus taking water from an untouchable woman, something which is still distant reality in South Indian villages, where the Dalits are not allowed to take water from the wells of others since they are considered 'polluting'.

== Early education and studies ==
=== Graduate studies ===
Raj underwent initial studies between 1940 and 1945 at the AELC-Andhra Christian College, Guntur and became a teacher. During the tenure of A. N. Gopal as president of the Andhra Evangelical Lutheran Church Society, Raj was sent for theological studies to the Gurukul Lutheran Theological College, Madras, where he studied from 1953 to 1956 under thoroughbred faculty, including Professor Hans-Werner Gensichen.

=== Post-graduate studies ===
In 1964 during the tenure of G. Devasahayam at the AELC Church Society, Raj was sent for post-graduate studies to the Indiana University Bloomington, where he completed a master's degree in education.

=== Doctoral studies ===
When the Selly Oak Colleges, Birmingham invited Raj to lecture in communication for term between 1978 and 1983, Raj not only taught at the college but also enrolled as a doctoral candidate and pursued research studies under the guidance of Walter Hollenweger. Raj also spent time at the Lutheran School of Theology at Chicago.

=== Art student ===
As an artist, Raj first learnt the nuances of art through the Sunday School and later became a student of the notable artist, Damerla Rama Rao and cleared a state examination in drawing and painting. While at the Indiana State University, he learnt woodblock printing and etching. As for batik, he learnt it from his friends in Hyderabad.

== Career ==
The career graph of Raj shows him as a teacher, pastor, administrator, professor and as an artist.

=== Pastor ===
Although Raj began his career as a teacher, he soon became a pastor of the Andhra Evangelical Lutheran Church Society serving as a chaplain of the AELC-Andhra Christian College, Guntur serving during 1956–1959. He then served at the Lutheran Theological College, Rajahmundry for a year, 1959–1960.

=== Administrator ===
In 1960, on the invitation of the National Council of Churches in India (NCCI), he took up the directorship of the Department for Audio-Visual education and served in Nagpur, the headquarters of the NCCI from 1960 to 1968. In 1968, he moved to Vijayawada to take up a role as director of the radio station, Suvartha Vani, a multimedia project of the Andhra Pradesh Council of Churches in partnership with Canadian Baptist Ministries, Andhra Evangelical Lutheran Church and Church of South India, serving during the period 1968–1978. K. L. Richardson writes that Rev. P. Solomon Raj of the AELC who had rich experience in radio evangelism also served in the programme of Suvartha Vani.

=== Professor ===
Raj took up professorship and lectured at the Selly Oak Colleges, Birmingham, from 1978 to 1983, where he taught communication. Raj was visiting lecturer in the United States of America during 1984–1985.

== Contribution ==
Scholars down the line have acknowledged the contribution of Raj to theology and art.

=== Writings ===
Ravela Joseph and B. Suneel Bhanu, who had undertaken a compilation in 1993 entitled Bibliography of original Christian writings in India in Telugu on behalf of the Board of Theological Education of the Senate of Serampore College, acknowledged Raj to be one of the original Christian writers in Telugu. They have listed out the following works by Raj,

- in 1957, How to Study the Bible,
- in 1957, Story Telling
- in 1973, Wild Flowers
- in 1977, A Theological Dictionary
- in 1978, Christ, the King of Kings
- in 1978, The House of Worship

In addition to the books listed out, Raj has also authored,

- in 1986, A Christian Folk Religion in India: A study of the small Church movement in Andhra Pradesh with special reference to the Bible Mission of Devadas. Second edition in 2004 published by the Centre for Contemporary Christianity, Bangalore,
- in 1993, Living flame and Springing Fountain: Batiks and Meditations,
- in 2003, Fiery Wheels: Art works and meditations,
- in 2003, New Wine Skins: The Story of the Indigenous Missions in coastal Andhra Pradesh.

=== Arts ===
Art forms interested Raj since his Sunday School days, and he soon got to show his arts from the later half of the 1960s. He was Artist-in-Residence in United States of America, Great Britain, Canada, Japan and Philippines (Asian Institute for Liturgy and Music, Manila). He held art shows and gave lectures in United Kingdom, United States of America, Japan, Sweden, Finland, Germany, Netherlands and the Philippines.

== Scholarly appraisal ==
- H. L. Richard, Research Scholar, Fuller Theological Seminary, Fuller,

Solomon Raj is a gifted artist particularly in Batiks where he specialised in Biblical themes while drawing on Indian cultural symbols. This makes him a rare bird among Indian Christians, but the combination of artist and missiologist is still more rare.

- Volker Küster, Professor of Comparative Religion and Missiology, Johannes Gutenberg Universität, Mainz,

By critical spirits among the visitors of his exhibitions, the batiks of Solomon Raj are often regarded as nice and harmless.

- Karel Steenbrink, Emeritus Professor, Department of Philosophy and Religious Studies, Utrecht University,

Solomon Raj is a true universal Christian artist blending a Christian vision with the language of International Art using for example, Indian symbols, Indonesian Batik technique, Japanese woodcut and some stereotypes of orthodox icons – all this with a powerful and very personal new style. His art works are loved and admired by many people all over the world.

- Fr. Peter Balleis, SJ, Mission Procurator, Nuremberg,

...one could hardly overlook his (Solomon Raj's) presence, which was visible in the form of a good number of his artistic works in some of our offices and corridors.

== Recognition and honours ==
In 1986, Raj was elected as the president of the Indian Christian Art Association. In 1987–88, Raj was William Paton Fellow at the Selly Oak Colleges, Birmingham.

In 2006, a postgraduate candidate at the Utrecht University, Jojanneke Dekker undertook a research on the works of Raj entitled Solomon Raj, Prophetic Artist in India: A Research on Dr. P. Solomon Raj's Art as a Medium of Inculturation of the Gospel in India.

Academic offices
Preceded by -	Honorary Fellow, Selly Oak Colleges, Birmingham; 1991	Succeeded by -
