= A. B. Masilamani =

Golden Jubilee Baptist pastor and evangelist

Acharya A. B. Masilamani Ayyagaru
- The Reverend Doctor
- Church: Protestant
- See: Convention of Baptist Churches of Northern Circars
- Elected: 1959
- In office: 1959
- Predecessor: Rev. J. I. Richardson, CBM
- Successor: Rev. A. D. Matheson, CBM

Orders
- Ordination: by Convention of Baptist Churches of Northern Circars
- Rank: Baptist Priest

Personal details
- Born: 30 November 1914 Pitapuram, East Godavari, Andhra Pradesh, India
- Died: 5 April 1990 (aged 75) Hyderabad; Andhra Pradesh, India
- Buried: Christian Cemetery, Narayanguda, Hyderabad; 17.4000° N, 78.0167° E
- Denomination: Christianity
- Parents: Smt. Saramma and Sri A. B Greshom Paul
- Spouse: Vimala Masilamani (m. 1931)
- Occupation: Pastor, professor and ecclesiastical administrator
- Profession: Priesthood
- Education: L.Th. (Serampore), B.Div. (Serampore), M. A (Calcutta), Th.M. (Toronto), PhD (Osmania)
- Alma mater: Baptist Theological Seminary, Kakinada, Serampore College, Serampore, Emmanuel College, Toronto (Canada), Osmania University, Hyderabad

Acharya A. B. Masilamani or Abel Boanerges Masilamani (1914–1990) was a Golden Jubilee Baptist pastor and evangelist on whom parallels had been drawn comparing his ecclesiastical ministry with that of Saint Paul. The Mar Thoma Syrian Church, one of the Saint Thomas Christian Churches founded by Thomas the Apostle in the first century which holds the annual Maramon Conventions used to have Masilamani preach at its conventions since the 1970s. During one such Maramon Convention held in 1983 at Maramon, Masilamani was one of the main speaker who spoke on Christology in the presence of the two patriarchs of the Mar Thoma Church, Alexander Mar Thoma and Thomas Mar Athanius.

Masilamani belonged to the Convention of Baptist Churches of Northern Circars and had ministered as a pastor since 1934 and was a spiritual formator from 1955 through 1958 at the Baptist Theological Seminary, a major seminary in Kakinada. Masilamani got popular acclaim, especially as an original hymn writer, in Telugu and nine of his compositions can be found in the Christian Hymnal in Telugu used in the Protestant churches in the Telugu-speaking states of Telangana and Andhra Pradesh, which P. Solomon Raj, the Lutheran pastor notes that it has been of high literary standard consisting of hymns in Telugu set in music patterns of Carnatic music and Hindustani classical music.

In 2000, Roger E. Hedlund, the Missiologist wrote that, along with the Bible, the Christian Hymnal in Telugu also formed the main bulwark of Christian spiritual life for the Telugu folk and of equal use to both the non-literates and the literates as well. Nearly a decade and half after the articles by P. Solomon Raj and Roger E. Hedlund on the importance of the Christian Hymnal in Telugu, G. Babu Rao, the Old Testament Scholar recollects the homiletical significance of the preaching and singing of Masilamani in the context of his birth centenary celebrations held in 2014,

We heard the messages of Masilamani in the Church Society gatherings of the Churches under Convention of Baptist Churches of Northern Circars where Masilamani would preach on a theme with key verses split into three parts, each stuffed with exegetical and expository-devotional and spiritually deep thoughts with exhortations through suitable and easily understood illustrations making an educated and illiterate member of Churches to go home feeling equally enthusiastic after having heard and listened to a wonderful sermon and songs. Sometimes the listeners would go home singing the theme song which Masilamani composed.

While the use of Telugu in Christian hymns was on an upward rise in the Protestant churches, it was not so among their Catholic counterparts who had to stick to Latin. It was not until the conclusion of the Second Vatican Council that vernacular languages began being used instead of Latin. Once the Vatican Council approved the use of vernacular languages in Church liturgy, most of the songs in the Christian Hymnal in Telugu including Masilamani's songs readily found their way into the Catholic Hymn Books in undivided Andhra Pradesh. The Rev. Fr. D. S. Amalorpavadass who espoused the cause of Indian ethos and advocated for inclusion of vernacular languages at the Second Vatican Council rechristened himself as Swamy Amalorananda at a later stage of his ecclesiastical career.

The growth of the Church in Telugu-speaking states of Telangana and Andhra Pradesh began taking shape with the advent of Catholic and Protestant Missions. One such Protestant Mission was the Canadian Baptist Mission which propagated the Gospel along the northern circars along the Bay of Bengal. Masilamani was the outcome of the missions and believed in self-identity of the Indian Church. Masilamani struck original ground in his lyrics and a forerunner in developing the Indian ethos way ahead of Rev. Fr. D. S. Amalorpavadass. At a later stage of his ecclesiastical life, Masilamani also rechristened himself as Acharya A. B. Masilamani in the spiritual traditions of India.

== Early life and family ==
Masilamani is a third-generation Christian. Reverend Abel Bellary, the grandfather of Masilamani, was a Hindu from a priestly class. Both the Catholic and the Protestant missions spearheaded the missionary activity. It was the Protestant Canadian Baptist Mission and American Baptist Mission (now Samavesam of Telugu Baptist Churches), through which Abel Bellary became a Christian taking the name 'Abel' as his Christian name, retaining 'Bellary' as his surname. Bellary was ordained and served as a Baptist pastor. Later, the family chose the surname 'Abel Boanerges' as the family name ('Abel' to recognise the first person to become a Christian (and 'Boanerges' means sons of thunder). One of Bellary's sons is A. B Greshmon Paul.

Masilamani was born to A. B Greshom Paul and A. B Saramma on 30 November 1914 in the princely state of Pitapuram, Andhra Pradesh, India. Masilamani means 'A Spotless Gem'. Unlike the Catholic priestly traditions, marriage is optional in the Protestant priestly traditions and Masilamani heeded the advice of his parents and married Vimala Masilamani in 1945. They have four children – Sujatha Prasad, Arathi Walter, Gordon Sunath and Joseph Kishore. His son, Rev. Dr. A.B Joseph Kishore is the senior pastor of New Life Community Church and Trinity Cathedral, Hyderabad, India.

Masilamani has seven grandchildren and many great-grandchildren. His grandson Rev. Seidel Abel Boanerges also known as Rev. A.B Seidel Sumanth, is a Baptist minister ordained by the Baptist Union of Great Britain. Seidel is currently the Dean of Ministerial Formation and Development and also the Tutor in Ministerial and Practical Theology at Spurgeon's College, London.

== Education ==
=== Scholastic and Ministerial Formation ===
Masilamani schooled at the Canadian Baptist Mission High School in Samalkot where he grew in Christian faith and built up his foundation on strong Christian ethics under notable Teachers including Chetti Bhanumurthy.

After his scholastic studies, Masilamani discerned his avocation towards spirituality and joined the Baptist Theological Seminary, Kakinada for ministerial formation where his Spiritual Formators happened to be Mutyala Theophilus and Chetti Bhanumurthy who had by that time moved to the seminary. The Baptist Theological Seminary, Kakinada where Masilamani had his ministerial formation is a Major Seminary which was directly affiliated to India's first University, the Senate of Serampore College (University) and Masilamani was awarded an L.Th (Licentiate of Theology) at the end of his spirituality course.

==== Graduate studies ====
Masilamani continued his theological studies and was incidentally sent to the university itself in 1941, during the Principalship of G. H. C. Angus where he took a B.Div. (Bachelor of Divinity) majoring in Biblical Interpretation, Greek, Christian Theology and other allied subjects from the only constituent college of the university, the Serampore College in 1945. During his stay at the old Danish town in Serampore, Masilamani also happened to alternately pursue a postgraduate degree from the arts section of the Serampore College affiliated to the University of Calcutta where he took an M.A (Master of Arts).

=== Post Graduate and doctoral studies ===
For long, Masilamani was assigned priestly duties at the Churches of the Canadian Baptist Mission whose area of operation included six northern coastal districts of Andhra Pradesh. As Masilamani had an academic leaning, the Council of the Baptist Theological Seminary at Kakinada sent him for postgraduate studies to the Emmanuel College, a constituent college of University of Toronto from where Masilamani took an Th.M. (Master of Theology) postgraduate degree in 1953 after submitting his dissertation entitled Hindu Anticipations of the Christian Gospel. Masilamani was a contemporary of the Old Testament Scholar Wolfgang Roth who also happened to study at the Emmanuel College around the same time in 1952. In later years, Wolfgang Roth taught at the Leonard Theological College, Jabalpur from 1959 onwards, whereas Masilamani taught at the Baptist Theological Seminary, Kakinada.

After a decade and half of ecclesiastical works, Masilamani did not stop and extol his educational pursuits and instead he registered as a doctoral candidate at the State-run University and obtained a PhD from Osmania University writing on 'Hindu and Christian Concept of Non-Violence'.

== Ecclesiastical career ==
=== Spiritual Formator, Kakinada ===
After completing his graduate studies in theology from the historical Serampore College, Masilamani was ordained as a Pastor of the Protestant Baptist Society, the Canadian Baptist Mission/Convention of Baptist Churches of Northern Circars. Masilamani held several posts in the Protestant Church in Andhra Pradesh. He was Professor and Principal of Baptist Theological Seminary, Kakinada (1955–1958). Masilamani inspired many during his stint as Principal of the Baptist Theological Seminary, Kakinada. One of his students, K. David went on to master the New Testament at Serampore College, West Bengal and also pursued doctoral studies at the Edinburgh University, Scotland. Masilamani also played the part of a vocation promoter and guided S. E. Krupa Rao to don the mantle of Priest. In his later years', S. E. Krupa Rao became a notable contributor in matters of ecclesiastical, medical and technical contribution of the Convention of Baptist Churches of Northern Circars as well as to the ecumenical movement through the Bible Society of India and the Andhra Pradesh Christian Council.

In ecclesiastical administration, Masilamani was elected President of Convention of Baptist Churches of Northern Circars in 1959 succeeding Rev. J. I. Richardson. In the continuing year, Masilamani was replaced by Rev. A. D. Matheson.

=== NCCI literature secretary, Secunderabad ===
After Masilamani's tenure as principal of the Major Seminary in Kakinada that ended in 1959, he took up a role as promotional secretary of the Convention of Baptist Churches of Northern Circars. The same year, on invitation from the National Council of Churches in India to loan the services of Masilamani, the Seminary Council of the Baptist Theological Seminary granted a leave-on-lien enabling him to take up the role of literature secretary with the Secunderabad unit of the National Council of Churches in India, where Masilamani was able to make use of his literary talents and minister in an ecumenical setting with the churches of the Orthodox and Protestant backgrounds.

=== BSI auxiliary secretary, Secunderabad ===
In 1963, when E. Prakasam retired as auxiliary secretary of the Bible Society of India Andhra Pradesh Auxiliary, Masilamani was appointed for the key position of auxiliary secretary and served in an ecumenical setting during the period 1963 to 1969. This period was eventful as the Bible Society of India headquartered in Bangalore was led by the rural Pastor A. E. Inbanathan who had an understanding of the Church in India and more so with fellow clergy.

Orville E. Daniel, a Canadian Baptist missionary, as early as 1973 wrote that Rev. Masilamani's distinguished service with the Bible Society of India was followed by a widespread evangelistic ministry, a fact reiterated by the Old Testament Scholar G. Babu Rao who points out that during Masilamani's tenure at the Bible Society of India Andhra Pradesh Auxiliary, he had set a trend and his work was regarded with great respect among the Protestant Churches in undivided Andhra Pradesh.

After a six-year tenure, Masilamani retired as auxiliary secretary of Bible Society of India Andhra Pradesh Auxiliary in 1969 making the Bible Society of India Trust Association to huddle and appoint B. G. Prasada Rao of the Church of South India.

=== Overseas visiting professorship in Canada ===
Masilamani was also a Visiting Professor for Acadia Divinity College, Canada where he delivered the Hayward lectures in 1976.

=== New Life Associates, Hyderabad ===
In 1970 Masilamani founded New Life Associates, a Protestant religious and social service organisation. As a Pastor of the Convention of Baptist Churches of Northern Circars, Masilamani also continued to minister for the Canadian Baptist Ministries.

=== Serampore College (Theology Department), Serampore ===
During 1974–1975, Masilamani was a part-time Lecturer in Evangelism in the Theology Department of his alma mater during the Principalship of Saral Kumar Chatterjee.

== Contribution ==
=== Vision for theological education ===
==== Efforts to form the Protestant Regional Theologiate ====
In the postcolonialism scenario the Protestant Churches in Andhra Pradesh and Telangana wanted to form a unified Protestant Seminary for the Anglicans, Baptists, Congregationalists, Lutherans, Methodists, Wesleyans and the Pentecostals, Masilamani and his companion Waldo Penner favoured a such unified seminary along with C. S. Sundaresan of the Andhra Union Theological Seminary in Dornakal, Louis F. Knoll of the Ramayapatnam Baptist Theological Seminary in Ramayapatnam and W. D. Coleman of the Lutheran Theological College, Rajahmundry. Masilamani was known for his integrity and able administration and steered clear of controversies. This remarkable feature of Masilamani inspired and guided many Theologians in their administration, especially the Spiritual Formators at the Protestant Seminary in Secunderabad. The sustained efforts of the vision of Masilamani and others resulted in the formation of the Andhra Christian Theological College in 1964 at Rajahmundry which eventually relocated to Secunderabad in 1973.

==== Kretzmann Commission ====
Masilamani was a member of the Kretzmann Commission constituted by the Board of Governors of the Andhra Christian Theological College. The Commission report that was tabled in 1969 had major implications for the theological curricula in Andhra Pradesh and Telangana. Masilamani, as member of the Kretzmann Commission had visited the St. John's Regional Seminary (Theologiate), Ramanthapur as well as the Mennonite Brethren Centenary Bible College, Shamshabad.

=== Writings ===
Masilamani was also the President of the Asia Baptist Youth Fellowship. He was the editor of popular Telugu Christian magazines like Ravi 1947–1960, Gruha Joythi 1961–1965 and Kapari 1970–1990 with articles contributed by notable Pastors and Bishops. In fact, M. Edwin Rao who compiled a centennial edition of the history of the Diocese of Dornakal writes that Bishop G. S. Luke used to contribute articles to the magazine Kapari edited by Masilamani.

Ravela Joseph and B. Suneel Bhanu who had been commissioned by the Board of Theological Education of the Senate of Serampore College to compile the original Christian writings in Telugu have also included the titles of Masilamani in the compilation Bibliography of Original Christian Writings in India in Telugu which include:

- Original writings in Telugu
  - A Telugu Theological Glossary, 1965,
  - Consequences, 1969,
  - Awareness (కనువిప్పు), 1980,
  - Worship with Flowers, 1981
  - Sermon Waves (ప్రసంగ వాహిని), 1982,
  - Stream of Sermons (ప్రసంగ తరంగాలు), 1982,
  - The Awakening (మేలుకొలుపు), 1984,
  - Zionism, 1984

=== Theological scholarship ===
Masilamani was also a scholar theologian. In 1960 when the ecumenical Indian Christian Theological Conference was held in Madras, he participated in its proceedings where the notable Theologian Joshua Russell Chandran also happened to take part. Masilamani presented a paper on the theme Christian View of Man in Society which was later published in the Indian Journal of Theology under the title The Modern Conception of Man in the light of the Christian Faith. The same year, Masilamani also attended a conference called for by the National Council of Churches in India, Nagpur and the Christian Institute for the Study of Religion and Society, Bangalore in the presence of Paul David Devanandan with the theme, Christian participation in nation-building: the summing up of a corporate study on rapid social change.

In 1981, Masilamani addressed an inter-faith seminar conducted by the Bharatiya Vidya Bhavan Educational Trust in Hyderabad and shared dais with a Hindu priest and a Mullah.

=== Lyricist ===
The Wisconsin University Scholar, R. R. Sundara Rao included Masilamani's songs in his treatise Bhakti Theology in the Telugu Hymnal. R. R. Sundara Rao who taught at the Protestant Seminary in Secunderabad writes that,

Masilamani was greatly influenced by his Teacher Chetty Bhanumurthy who happened to tutor him both at the high school level as well as at the Seminary in Kakinada.

The name of Masilamani rings bells in the Catholic and Protestant Churches where the hymns he had composed are sung melodiously to this day.

Masilamani is one of the proponents of Bhakti Theology in the line of the pioneers Chetty Bhanumurthy, Puroshottam Choudhary, Murari David and others. Incidentally, Masilamani was a pupil of the lyricist Chetty Bhanumurthy at the Baptist Theological Seminary at Kakinada from where he is said to have imbibed the element of Bhakti in his lyric compositions in the line of the Ramanujacharya, the great Indian Vaishnava Saint on whose life many Christian parallels can be found.

The Christian Hymnal in Telugu has the following nine compositions by Masilamani, .

- Original songs in Telugu
  - – అందాల తార – Andala Tara,
  - Hymn 96 – 'దేవుని నీతి ప్రతాపం – Devuni Neethi Pratapam',
  - Hymn 135 – 'రండి సువార్త సునాదముతొ – Randi Suvartha Sunaadamu',
  - Hymn 278 – 'జీవాహారము రమ్ము- Jeevaharamu Rammu',
  - Hymn 307 – 'హే ప్రభుయేసు – He Prabhu Yesu',
  - Hymn 349 – 'సంతొషింపరె ప్రియులార – Santoshimpare Priyulara',
  - Hymn 367 – 'దేవా! వెంబడించితి నీ నామమున్ – Deva vembadinchithi née naamamun',
  - Hymn 378 – 'కఱుణాపీఠము జేరరె – Karuna peetamu jerare',
  - Hymn 661 – 'నడిపించు నా నావ – Nadipinchu Naa Naava',. This is a well known song among Telugu Christians. Sakshi, a popular Telugu Daily Newspaper in India, noted that it is highly unlikely you will find a Telugu Christian or a Telugu Christian Church who has never sung this song.
- English Hymns translated into Telugu
  - Hymn 65 – The Love of God (original writer unknown),
  - Hymn 606 – Blest be the tie that binds (John Fawcett).

== Scholarly appraisal on Masilamani ==
- C. L. Johnson, CBCNC, Principal of the Baptist Theological Seminary, Kakinada,

There are many hymns written by Masilamani but the evergreen hymn for Communion service Jeevaharamu is the most popular among all the Protestant Churches.

- Dass Babu, CSI, Former communications secretary of the Church of South India Synod,

Masilamani was a man of the masses, standing tall with a handsome personality and a majestic demeanour coupled with remarkable oratorial skills, he made his presence on stage compelling.

- Sam Chaise, CBM, executive director, Canadian Baptist Ministries,

We at the Canadian Baptist Ministries always believed that the job of the missionaries is to disciple and train local leaders for the Church and to empower them to lead while the missionary takes a less public role. Masilamani was a significant example of the calibre of leadership that emerged in our work in India.

- Taranath S. Sagar, MCI, Bishop in Bangalore Episcopal Area of the Methodist Church in India,

Masilamani's ministry of teaching and preaching strengthened millions of people in India across all denominations. Even in Maramon Convention, he was remembered and many people shared his ministry.

- Thathapudi Mathews Emmanuel, CBCNC, Old Testament teacher and was Principal of the Protestant Regional Seminary in Secunderabad,

Masilamani taught sound biblical doctrine to the Churches both by preaching and writing songs. He presented the gospel in a very simple manner which can reach even the rural masses. The whole Telugu Church benefited by his contribution which is long lasting.

- Talathoti Punnaiah, STBC, Pastor, Craig Emmanuel Baptist Church, Kakinada,

Masilamani spent eight days in 1982 at the revival meetings arranged at The Madras Centenary Telugu Baptist Church, Vepery and everyone appreciated the messages of Masilamani.

== Honours and recognition ==
For his contributions to worldwide Christian ministry many took note of Masilamani and was known by several nicknames, including 'Billy Graham of the East', 'Man of the Age', 'Spotless Gem' and 'King of Preachers'. The Indian Railways have referred to Masilamani as a renowned Evangelist.

=== 1974: Honorary doctorate degree ===
In 1974, the McMaster University, Canada awarded him with a Doctor of Divinity degree.

=== 2006 & 2012: Critical research on the works of Masilamani ===
- In 2006, a doctorate degree was awarded by the State-run Andhra University, Visakhapatnam to one of its doctoral candidates, Anita Margaret then student at the Department of Telugu who undertook a research study on Masilamani's writings entitled A Critical Analysis of Dr. A. B. Masilamani's Writings under the supervision of Prof. G. Yohan Babu.
- In 2012, K. Ranjit Kumar, then Faculty Member at the Master's College of Theology, Visakhapatnam wrote an article entitled Bhakti as one of the leading factor for transformation in the lyrics of Acharya A. B. Masilamani in the Telugu Christian Hymnal which appeared in the Master's College Theological Journal.

=== 2014: Special TV documentary ===
In 2014, Aradhana TV, a Telugu Christian devotional TV channel, aired a one-hour special documentary on the life of Dr Masilamani as a tribute for his birth centenary celebrations.

=== 2021: Philatelic cover ===
On 30 November 2021, Ministry of Communications (India), Department of Posts released a Philatelic cover through Office of Postmaster General Visakhapatnam region. This was released by Dr. M. Venkateswarlu, Postmaster General and N. Somasekhara Rao, Senior Superintendent of Post Offices, Visakhapatnam Division in the presence of Bishop M. A. Daniel, MCI and Dr. A. B. Joseph Kishore.

== Gallery ==
Academic offices
Preceded by Chetty Bhanumurthy, CBCNC; 1952–1955	Principal; Baptist Theological Seminary, Kakinada; 1955–1958	Succeeded by Waldo Penner, CBM; 1958–1964
Honorary titles
Preceded by J. I. Richardson, CBM; 1958	President, CBCNC, Kakinada; 1959	Succeeded by A. D. Matheson, CBM; 1960
Other offices
Preceded by E. Prakasam, AELC; 1953–1963	Auxiliary Secretary; Bible Society of India Andhra Pradesh Auxiliary, Secunderabad (relocated to Guntur in 2016); 1963–1969	Succeeded by B. G. Prasada Rao, CSI; 1969–1976
Educational offices
Preceded by John Bright; 1975	Hayward Lectures Visiting Professor; Acadia Divinity College, Canada; 1976	Succeeded by David S. Russell; 1977
Religious titles
Preceded by Post created	President, New Life Associates, Hyderabad; 1970–1990	Succeeded by A. B. Joseph Kishore; 1990–
