= D. N. Premnath =

The Reverend D. N. Premnath
- Born: Devadasan Nithya Premnath; 21 October 1950; India
- Citizenship: United States
- Education: B.A. (1970), M.A. (1972), B.D. (1977), Th.D. (1984)
- Alma mater: Arts and Science College, Chittoor, Sri Venkateswara University, Tirupati, United Theological College, Bangalore, Graduate Theological Union, Berkeley
- Occupations: Pastor and Teacher
- Years active: 1984-present
- Parent(s): Saraswathy Kamala (mother) and Easter Rakshnya Das (father)
- Religion: Christianity
- Church: Church of South India
- Ordained: 1977 (Bishop Sundar Clarke, CSI)
- Writings: See section
- Congregations served: Diocese of Vellore, (1977-1978), St. John's Presbyterian Church in Berkeley, California (1979-1983)
- Offices held: Teacher - in - Old Testament, United Theological College, Bangalore (1984-1987)
- Title: The Reverend Doctor

Devadasan Nithya Premnath (born 21 October 1950), known as D. N. Premnath, is an Indian pastor and Old Testament scholar, who has been teaching since 1988 at the St. Bernard's School of Theology and Ministry, a Roman Catholic seminary, in Rochester, New York. In 1981, Premnath participated in an archaeological dig at Tell el-Hesi in southern Israel.

Premnath had earlier taught at United Theological College, Bangalore the Protestant Regional Theologiate, between 1984–1987. and has been a member of the Society for Biblical Studies in India as well as the Society of Biblical Literature since 1988 and has chaired the Asian and Asian-American Biblical Hermeneutics Group during 1996–2001.

== Studies ==
=== General ===
Premnath hails from Chittoor district in southern Andhra Pradesh where he pursued scholastic and collegiate studies at the local Arts and Science College, Chittoor leading to a B.A. degree in 1970 and then enrolled for a M.A. programme at the University College in Sri Venkateswara University, Tirupati which awarded him a postgraduate degree in 1972.

=== Spiritual ===
==== India ====
In 1972, Premnath discerned his avocation towards priesthood and shared his concerns to then Bishop Lesslie Newbigin who accepted Premnath as a ministerial candidate of the Diocese of Madras of the Protestant Church of South India comprising dual linguistic groups, the Telugu language and Tamil language hailing from Andhra Pradesh and Tamil Nadu. After a year of ministry assisting Pastors in the Diocese of Madras, Premnath was then sent to the Protestant Regional Theologiate in Bangalore in 1973, then under the Principalship of Joshua Russell Chandran, where he enrolled for graduate studies in spirituality leading to Bachelor of Divinity with notable faculty comprising the religious scholar, The Rev. G. D. Melanchthon, AELC, the Practical Ministry Scholar, Bobbili Prabhudass, the New Testament scholars The Rev. K. James Carl, South Andhra Lutheran Church (SALC) and D. S. Satyaranjan as well as the Old Testament trio, E. C. John, G. M. Butterworth and Gerhard Wehmeier.

During the study period of Premnath between 1973-1977 his companions included P. Surya Prakash, S. W. Meshack, Mani Chacko, and others who were also pursuing graduate courses at varying intervals while S. J. Theodore, Nitoy Achümi, J. W. Gladstone, D. Dhanaraj and others were pursuing postgraduate courses. In the ensuing convocation of the Senate of Serampore College (University), Premnath was awarded a B.D. degree in 1978 during the Registrarship of J. T. Krogh.

==== United States ====
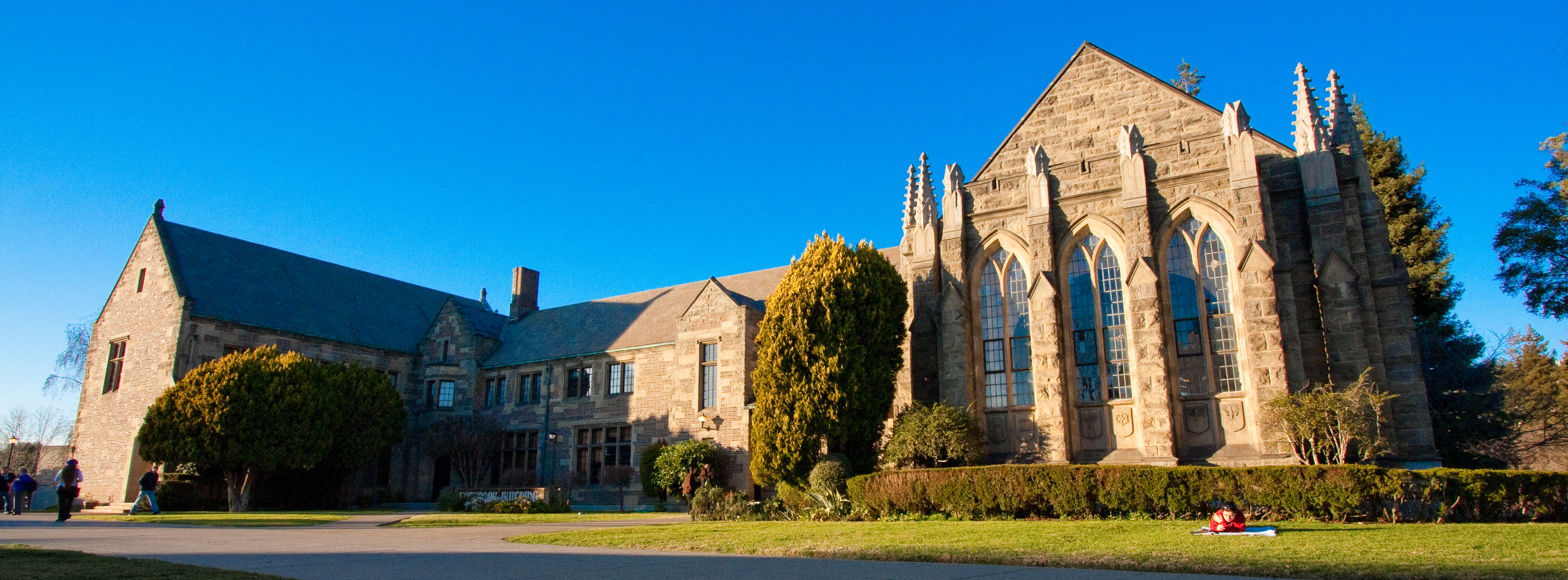
The Holbrook Building at Pacific School of Religion in Berkeley, California where Premnath undertook research studies in the Old Testament.

In 1979, then Bishop Sundar Clarke sent Premnath to the US on a World Council of Churches doctoral fellowship to pursue advanced studies at the Pacific School of Religion under the consortium of the Graduate Theological Union affiliated to the University of California. Premnath researched in Old Testament with the title, The Process of the growth of large estates as mirrored in the eighth century oracles of Amos, Hosea, Isaiah and Micah and awarded a doctoral degree in 1984 by the Graduate Theological Union.

== Ecclesiastical ministry ==
=== India ===
After Premnath completed his studies in spirituality, he was assigned a pastoral role in the Diocese of Madras and was ordained as a Pastor by then Bishop Sundar Clarke and subsequently Premnath was involved in youth work from 1977 through 1978.

In 1984, the Diocese of Madras assigned a teaching role for Premnath at the United Theological College, Bangalore, which by then was led by E. C. John, the Principal. Premnath taught Old Testament along with E. C. John and Theodore N. Swanson. Among the postgraduate students who specialized in Old Testament under Premnath and taught at seminaries elsewhere were:

- 1986-1988, Ch. Victor Moses, AELC, who came under the influence of the Old Testament Scholars, Victor Premasagar, Ph.D. (St. Andrews) and G. Babu Rao, M.Th. (Serampore) at the Andhra Christian Theological College and later taught at the Gurukul Lutheran Theological College, Chennai,

In April 1986, Premnath participated in an Old Testament scholarly consultation conducted by the Tamil Nadu Theological Seminary, Madurai attended by a host of Old Testament faculty throughout India, comprising K. V. Mathew, E. C. John, Renthy Keitzar, Gnana Robinson, Kallarakkal Abraham George, G. Babu Rao, Geevarughese Mathew, Daniel Jones Muthynayagom and others in the presence of Klaus Koch and John Emerton of the Universities of Hamburg and Cambridge.

=== United States ===
In 1979, Premnath was sent to the US by then Bishop Sundar Clarke to pursue advanced spiritual studies where in addition to his studies, Premnath also became an Ecumenical Minister in Residence at the St. John's Presbyterian Church in Berkeley, California serving up to 1983. During the time in Berkeley, California, Premnath also taught Old Testament at the Pacific School of Religion from 1981–1983 after which he returned to India and taught at the United Theological College, Bangalore from 1984 through 1987.

In 1988, St. Bernard's School of Theology and Ministry took Premnath as its faculty member where he began teaching the Old Testament and Biblical Hebrew language and continues in the school.

== Selected works ==
- 2011, Thoughts on Advent,
- 2008, Amos and Hosea: Socio-historical Background and Prophetic Critique,
- 2007 (Edited), Border Crossings: Cross-Cultural Hermeneutics: Essays in honour of R. S. Sugirtharajah,
- 2007, Loan Practices in the Hebrew Bible,
- 2006, Biblical Interpretation in India: History and Issues,
- 2006, Amos,
- 2005, Hindu-Christian Relations in India,
- 2003, Eighth Century Prophets. A Social Analysis,
- 2000, Challenges and Prospects in a Multi-Scriptural Context,
- 1997, Latifundialization and Isaiah 5: 8-10,
- 1994, The Concepts of Rta and Maat: A Study in Comparison,
- 1988, The Old Testament against its Cultural Background and its implications for Theological Education,
- 1985, Human Development and Shalom,
- 1985, Comparative and Historical Sociology in Old Testament Research: A Study of Isaiah 3: 12-15,

Academic offices
Preceded by Theodore N. Swanson	Teacher - in - Old Testament; United Theological College, Bangalore; 1984-1987	Succeeded by James Vijayakumar
