= Arcot Lutheran Church =

Christian denomination in India

Arcot Lutheran Church is a Christian denomination in India. It has about 70,000 members. It belongs to National Council of Churches in India, United Evangelical Lutheran Church in India, Lutheran World Federation and World Council of Churches. The Bishop and the President of this church is Rt. Rev. Dr. D. Peter Paul Thomas Its headquarters are in Cuddalore, Tamil Nadu. The other churches belonging to the United Evangelical Lutheran Church in India are:

- Andhra Evangelical Lutheran Church
- Evangelical Lutheran Church in Madhya Pradesh
- Evangelical Lutheran Church in the Himalayan States
- Good Samaritan Evangelical Lutheran Church
- Gossner Evangelical Lutheran Church in Chotanagpur and Assam
- Indian Evangelical Lutheran Church
- Jeypore Evangelical Lutheran Church
- Northern Evangelical Lutheran Church
- South Andhra Lutheran Church
- Tamil Evangelical Lutheran Church

== See also ==
- Christianity in Tamil Nadu
