= R. R. Sundara Rao =

The Reverend Doctor R. R. Sundara Rao, AELC Scholar of Comparative religion
- Born: Rayi Ratna Sundara Rao; 15 July 1934; Andhra Pradesh
- Died: 9 November 1992 (aged 58); Tamil Nadu
- Education: L.Th. (Serampore); B.A. (Andhra), B. D. (Serampore); M.A. (Venkateshwara), Ph.D. (Wisconsin)
- Alma mater: Lutheran Theological College, Rajahmundry (Andhra Pradesh), Andhra University, Waltair (Andhra Pradesh), Venkateshwara University, Tirupati (Andhra Pradesh), University of Wisconsin, Madison (United States)
- Occupation: Comparative religion Scholar
- Years active: 1960-1992 (32 years)
- Parent(s): Smt. Catherine (Mother), Sri David (Father)
- Religion: Christianity
- Church: Andhra Evangelical Lutheran Church Society
- Ordained: 1960, G. Devasahayam, AELC
- Writings: See detailed section
- Congregations served: AELC congregations (1960-1973)
- Offices held: Professor, Andhra Christian Theological College, Secunderabad (1973-1988); Professor, Gurukul Lutheran Theological College, Chennai (1988-1992)
- Title: The Reverend Doctor

Rayi Ratna Sundara Rao (born 1934; died 1992) was a prolific writer, theologian and comparative religion scholar who once was the principal of the Gurukul Lutheran Theological College, Chennai, affiliated to India's first university, the Senate of Serampore College (University).

Some of his writings are kept in digitized versions at the National Library of India and the Indian Institute of Science.

In a 2014 study, Katherine C. Zubko of the University of North Carolina at Asheville highlights that Sundara Rao's assumption of bhakti was a more inward expression for concern for others cutting across religious boundaries. In fact, Sundara Rao's treatise, "Bhakti Theology in the Telugu Hymnal" had struck new ground in finding the origins of the bhakti element in Christian hymns in the Telugu language. The missiologist, Roger E. Hedlund, asserted that along with the Bible, the Christian Hymnal in Telugu also formed the main bulwark of Christian spiritual life for the Telugu folk and of equal use to both the non-literates and the literates as well. In such a setting of the importance of the Telugu Hymnal, Sundara Rao's study reiterated the fact that bhakti had been a binding factor for the early Christians in the Telugu-speaking states of Andhra Pradesh and Telangana. While this has been so, new studies in 2014 by the Harvard scholars, Ch. Vasantha Rao and John B. Carman indicate that the element of bhakti had little inroad into the otherwise rural India which in their study wholly depended on folk element.

== Studies ==
Sundara Rao had his ministerial formation at the Lutheran Theological College in Rajahmundry, affiliated to the India's first university, the Senate of Serampore College, under the principalship of G. Devasahayam. He graduated in 1960 and was awarded a L. Th. degree by then registrar of the university, Chetti Devasahayam, CBCNC. Rao later upgraded his qualifications by pursuing a Bachelor of Divinity degree, awarded by the university, again during the registrarship of Devasahayam.

For language studies, Sundara Rao enrolled for a graduate and postgraduate programme in Telugu at the Andhra University and the Sri Venkateswara University which awarded him with a Bachelor of Arts and a Master of Arts respectively. He also researched from 1976 to 1980 at the University of Wisconsin, Madison submitting a dissertation in 1981 entitled "The bhakti element in Āndhra Kraistava Kīrtanalu : an intensive study of the phenomenon of bhakti, a Sanskrit word for devotion, as presented in the Telugu Christian Hymnal".

== Ecclesiastical career ==
Sundara Rao was a pastor of the Andhra Evangelical Lutheran Church Society and ministered in congregations until his appointment as lecturer in 1973 at the Andhra Christian Theological College in Hyderabad where he taught in an ecumenical setting with other Protestant congregations. In fact, the Lutheran Theological College, Rajahmundry where he had his ministerial formation, amalgamated in 1964 with Andhra Christian Theological College, a special purpose entity which comprised four existing seminaries:

- the Andhra Union Theological College, Dornakal comprising the Anglicans and the Methodists
- the Baptist Theological Seminary, Kakinada comprising the Baptists (Canadian)
- the Lutheran Theological College, Rajahmundry comprising the Lutherans (American and German)
- the Ramayapatnam Baptist Theological Seminary, Ramayapatnam comprising the Baptists (American).

Sundara Rao taught in the special purpose entity from 1973 to 1988 when the college was led by three church societies, namely the Church of South India, the Convention of Baptist Churches of Northern Circars and the Samavesam of Telugu Baptist Churches led by Victor Premasagar, K. David and S. Joseph respectively.

From 1988 onwards, Sundara Rao accepted a teaching assignment at the Gurukul Lutheran Theological College in Chennai and taught religions. On 1 April 1992, he was made principal of the college, a role which brought greater responsibilities. On 9 November 1992, he died in Chennai.

== Writings ==
Ravela Joseph and Suneel Bhanu compiled a Bibliography of original Christian writings in India in Telugu in 1993 which included the writings of Sundara Rao. It was published by the Board of Theological Education of the Senate of Serampore College.

- No date: Essays on Special Christian Themes (in Telugu) unpublished manuscript listed in Joseph and Suneel Bhanu
- No date: Renaissance Movements (in Telugu), unpublished manuscript listed in Joseph and Suneel Bhanu
- 1963: Prayer (in Telugu), Lutheran Publishing House, Guntur, 1963. Listed in Joseph and Suneel Bhanu
- 1976: Telugulo Kraistava Sahityam (in Telugu) Secunderabad, 1976. Listed in Joseph and Suneel Bhanu (reprint in 1989)
- 1983: Bhakti theology in the Telugu hymnal,
- 1986: Mahākavi Jāṣuva vyaktitvaṃ, kavitvaṃ (in Telugu)
- 1987: Bābālu, Svāmījīlu, Gurumahārājulu (in Telugu)
- 1989: A critical look at Ambedkar's conversion
- 1990: Mission and evangelism in India
- 1990: The Church in Andhra Pradesh

== Honours ==
In 1975, the Kadapa-based Kala Kendriya Sangham and Yuva Rachayitala Sangham conferred upon Sundara Rao the title of Sahitya Vibhushan. Subsequently, in 1982, the Secunderabad-based Kraistava Sahitya Vihaaram awarded him a Sahitya Ratna.

Academic offices
Preceded by M. Bage, GELC	Principal, Gurukul Lutheran Theological College, Chennai; 1.4.1992-9.11.1992	Succeeded by D. W. Jesudoss, TELC; 1992-2001

Further reading

- Dorothy Yoder Nyce (2015). "Glimpses of Mennonite Engagement with Hindu Thought and Practice". Anabaptist Witness.
- Katherine C. Zubko (2014). Dancing Bodies of Devotion: Fluid Gestures in Bharata Natyam. ISBN 978-0-7391-8728-9.
- John B. Carman & Chilkuri Vasantha Rao (2014). Christians in South Indian Villages, 1959-2009. ISBN 978-0-8028-7163-3.
- James Elisha Taneti (2011). History of the Telugu Christians: A Bibliography. ISBN 978-0-8108-7243-1.
- Chandra Mallampalli (2004). Christians and Public Life in Colonial South India, 1863-1937: Contending with marginality. ISBN 0-203-39087-3.
- Herbert E. Hoefer (1991). Churchless Christianity. ISBN 0-87808-444-4.
