= Evangelical Lutheran Church in the Himalayan States =

Christian denomination in India

Evangelical Lutheran Church in the Himalayan States is a Christian denomination in India. It has about 25,000 members. It belongs to the Lutheran World Federation. Its president is Godwin Nag. The other churches belonging to the United Evangelical Lutheran Church in India are:

- Andhra Evangelical Lutheran Church
- Arcot Lutheran Church
- Evangelical Lutheran Church in Madhya Pradesh
- Good Samaritan Evangelical Lutheran Church
- Gossner Evangelical Lutheran Church in Chotanagpur and Assam
- Indian Evangelical Lutheran Church
- Jeypore Evangelical Lutheran Church
- Northern Evangelical Lutheran Church
- South Andhra Lutheran Church
- Tamil Evangelical Lutheran Church

== See also ==
- Adivasi
- Christianity in India
