= Evangelical Lutheran Church in Madhya Pradesh =

Christian denomination in India

Evangelical Lutheran Church in Madhya Pradesh is a Church belonging to the Lutheran denomination in India. It has about 22,000 members. The head office is situated in Chhindwara, Madhya Pradesh. It is affiliated with United Evangelical Lutheran Church in India, National Council of Churches in India, Lutheran World Federation and Christian Conference of Asia. It is currently led by Bishop Rt. Rev. Surendra Sukka It exists since 1923. The other churches belonging to the United Evangelical Lutheran Church in India are:

- Andhra Evangelical Lutheran Church
- Arcot Lutheran Church
- Evangelical Lutheran Church in the Himalayan States
- Good Samaritan Evangelical Lutheran Church
- Gossner Evangelical Lutheran Church in Chotanagpur and Assam
- Indian Evangelical Lutheran Church
- Jeypore Evangelical Lutheran Church
- Northern Evangelical Lutheran Church
- South Andhra Lutheran Church
- Tamil Evangelical Lutheran Church

== See also ==
- Adivasi
- Christianity in India
- Christianity in Madhya Pradesh
