= E. Prakasam =

E. Prakasam, AELC
- The Reverend
- Church: Lutheran
- Diocese: Synods of East Godavari, West Godavari, East Guntur, West Guntur, Central Guntur
- See: Andhra Evangelical Lutheran Church (AELC)
- In office: 1944–1950
- Predecessor: Post Created
- Successor: A. N. Gopal
- Previous posts: Pastor, AELC St. Paul's Church, Rajahmundry

Personal details
- Born: 1897 Andhra Pradesh, India
- Died: India

E. Prakasam, a Lutheran, was the first Indian President of the Protestant Andhra Evangelical Lutheran Church Society whose ministry was primarily based in the Guntur district and also in East Godavari District, West Godavari District, Krishna District, and Visakhapatnam District. Being one of the established Indian Pastors, Prakasam was elected as president and served from 1944 to 1950 after which he resumed his Pastoral duties as a Lutheran Pastor.

B. C. Paul and K. L. Richardson, Professors of Church History at the Protestant Andhra Christian Theological College, Secunderabad have successively researched the history of the Protestant Andhra Evangelical Lutheran Church. B. C. Paul first researched at the Lutheran School of Theology at Chicago covering the period from 1905 to 1927 while K. L. Richardson covered the period from 1927 to 1969 at the United Theological College, Bangalore. Both of them have covered the era of E. Prakasam in their research.

When the Bible Society of India Andhra Pradesh Auxiliary was created, E. Prakasam was appointed to the key ecumenical position in 1953, a post which he held until his retirement in 1963 and was succeeded by A. B. Masilamani of the Protestant Church Society, Canadian Baptist Mission/Convention of Baptist Churches of Northern Circars.

== Contribution ==
E. Prakasam was a prolific writer. Ravela Joseph and Suneel Bhanu on behalf of the Board of Theological Education of the Senate of Serampore College compiled original Christian writings in Telugu. They have included two of the titles of Prakasam in their exhaustive compilation:

- Original writings in Telugu
  - Peter Pope, the story of the first Protestant Indian Christian, 1942
  - Modern Trends in Hinduism, 1950

Further, the Church Historian, James Elisha Tanetim has written that E. Prakasam was the series editor at the Christian Literature Society, Madras for the volume Telugu Church Founders.

The Christian Hymnal in Telugu lists one lyric written by E. Prakasam, Hymn 153, Nerchukonare Yesuvaduka...

Giḍugu Vēṅkaṭa Sītāpati, writing in the Sahitya Academy publication brings to light one of the writings of E. Prakasam entitled The Origin and Progress of the Christian Church in Andhra Desa. Professor Golla Narayanaswamy Reddy also cites an article of E. Prakasam with special reference to the influence of English in Telugu literature.

Religious titles
Preceded by Post created	President; Andhra Evangelical Lutheran Church; 1944-1950	Succeeded by A. N. Gopal; 1951–1955
Other offices
Preceded by Post created	Auxiliary Secretary; Bible Society of India Andhra Pradesh Auxiliary; 1953–1963	Succeeded by A. B. Masilamani; 1963–1969
