= National Council of Churches in India =

Christian ecumenical forum

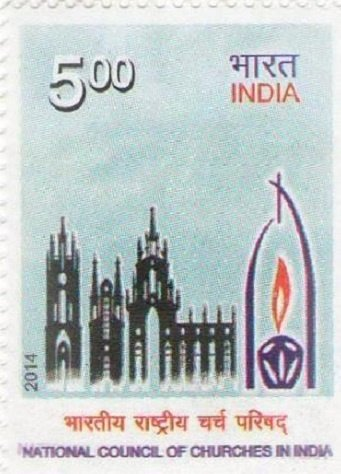
- National Council of Churches in India, Stamp of India 2014
- Formation: 1914, India
- Type: NGO
- Purpose: Ecumenism
- Headquarters: Nagpur
- Location: India
- Region served: India
- Services: National Council of Churches Review (Journal)
- Members: 30 (2015)
- Official language: English
- Secretary General: Rev. Asir Ebenezer, CSI
- President: Dr. Geevarghese Mar Yulios (Malankara Orthodox Church)
- Vice President: Rev. Pakiam T Samuel (Church of South India) Mrs. Basanti Biswas (Methodist Church in India) Sheron M M Dass (Mennonite Church in India)
- Subsidiaries: 30
- Affiliations: World Council of Churches, Christian Conference of Asia, South Asian Council of Churches, World Communion of Reformed Churches, Council for World Mission, Lutheran World Federation, World Association for Christian Communication
- Website: http://ncci1914.com

The National Council of Churches in India is an ecumenical forum for Protestant and Orthodox churches in India. It provides a platform for member churches and organizations to act on common issues relating to Christianity in India.

== History ==
The Council was established in 1914 as the "National Missionary Council." In 1923, the Council constituted itself as the "National Christian Council of India, Burma and Ceylon," with the British ecumenist William Paton as its first general secretary. The Councils of Burma and Sri Lanka separated, and in 1979 the Council transformed itself into what is known as the "National Council of Churches in India."

== Description ==
Today, it is an Inter-confessional autonomous Council and an ecumenical expression constantly initiating, promoting and coordinating various forms of ministries of Witness and Service in the wider community and society. The Council also serves as a common platform for thought and action and as such it brings together the Churches and other Christian organisations for mutual consultation, assistance and action in all matters related to the life and witness of the Churches in India. The NCCI is committed to the Gospel values of Justice, Unity & Peace.

The Council embraces, promotes and coordinates various kinds of activities for responsible life and witness, for upholding human dignity, for ecological and economic justice, for transparency and accountability, and for equity and harmony, through its constituent members and in partnership with civil society, NGOs, People’s Movements and well wishers at local, national and international levels.

The member churches and the regional councils are the primary members of the council. The Assembly which is the supreme body meets every four years. The Executive Committee meets annually to oversee the work of the Council and also appoints the Working Committee which meets twice in a year to guide and monitor its activities.

== Concerns ==
For operational efficiency, the NCCI works through four thematic concerns related to the objectives of the organisation, as well as the agencies and autonomous bodies that have evolved from the NCCI

- Concerns
  - Policy, Governance and Public Witness,
  - Dalit and Tribal/ Adivasi Concerns,
  - Women Concerns,
  - Youth Concerns,
  - Ecumenical Fora

In addition to the Concern of the NCCI, the following organisations have evolved out of the NCCI and operate independently,

- Agencies
  - All India Sunday School Association (AISSA), Secunderabad,
  - Christian Institute for the Study of Religion and Society (CISRS), Bangalore,
  - Christian Literature Society (CLS), Chennai,
  - Christian Medical Association of India (CMAI), New Delhi,
  - Church's Auxiliary for Social Action (CASA), New Delhi,
  - Ecumenical Church Loan Fund - India (ECLOF), Chennai,
  - Henry Martyn Institute, International Center for Theological Research, Interfaith Relations and Reconciliation, Hyderabad.
- Autonomous bodies
  - Urban Rural Mission (URM),
  - India Peace Centre (IPC),

List of General Secretaries

(Period, Name of the General Secretary )

- 1982-1989, Dr. Mathai Zachariah
- 1989-1994, Rev. K. Lungmuana, PCI
- 1995-2005, Rev. Ipe Joseph, MMTSC
- 2005-2009, Rev. D. K. Sahu, CNI
- 2010-2018, Rev. Roger Gaikwad, PCI
- 2019-Present, Rev. Asir Ebenezer, CSI

== Members ==
The NCCI has a membership from the Protestant and Orthodox Church societies as well as national organisations and the internal wings of the NCCI.

== Church societies ==
Church societies:

- Andhra Evangelical Lutheran Church,
- Arcot Lutheran Church,
- Baptist Church of Mizoram,
- Bengal Orissa Bihar Baptist Convention,
- Believers Eastern Church
- Chaldean Syrian Church of the East,
- Church of North India,
- Church of South India,
- Convention of Baptist Churches of Northern Circars,
- Council of Baptist Churches in Northeast India,
- Evangelical Lutheran Church in Madhya Pradesh,
- Good Samaritan Evangelical Lutheran Church,
- Gossner Evangelical Lutheran Church in Chotanagpur and Assam,
- Hindustani Covenant Church,
- India Evangelical Lutheran Church,
- Jeypore Evangelical Lutheran Church,
- Malabar Independent Syrian Church,
- Malankara Jacobite Syrian Orthodox Church,
- Malankara Orthodox Syrian Church,
- Malankara Mar Thoma Syrian Church,
- Mennonite Brethren Church,
- Mennonite Church in India,
- Methodist Church in India,
- Northern Evangelical Lutheran Church,
- Presbyterian Church of India,
- St. Thomas Evangelical Church of India
- South Andhra Lutheran Church,
- Tamil Evangelical Lutheran Church,
- The National Organisation of the New Apostolic Church,
- The Salvation Army,

=== Other national societies ===
Other national societies:

- All India Association for Christian Higher Education
- Association of Theologically Trained Women of India
- Bible Society of India
- Board of Theological Education of the Senate of Serampore College
- Christian Association for Radio and Audio Visual Service
- Christian Endeavour in India
- Christian Union of India
- Ecumenical Council for Drought Action and Water Management
- Indian Society for Promoting Christian Knowledge
- Inter-Church Service Association
- The Leprosy Mission
- Lott Carey Baptist Mission in India
- National Council of YMCAs of India
- National Missionary Society of India
- Student Christian Movement of India
- United Evangelical Lutheran Churches in India
- Young Women’s Christian Association of India

=== Regional Councils of Churches ===
Regional councils of churches:

- Andhra Pradesh Council of Churches
- Bengal Christian Council
- Bihar Council of Churches
- Chhattisgarh Christian Council
- Gujarat Council of Churches
- Jharkhand Council of Churches
- Karnataka Christian Council
- Kerala Council of Churches
- Madhya Pradesh Christian Council
- Maharashtra Council of Churches
- North East India Christian Council
- North West Frontier Christian Council
- North West India Council of Churches
- Santalia Council of Churches
- Tamil Nadu Christian Council
- Telangana Council of Churches
- Utkal Christian Council
- Uttar Pradesh Council of Churches
