= Good Samaritan Evangelical Lutheran Church =

Christian denomination in India

Good Samaritan Evangelical Lutheran Church is a Christian denomination in India. It has about 40,000 members. Its headquarters is in Bhadrachalam, Telangana. It has been founded in 1972. It is led by T. Esther Rani. The other churches belonging to the United Evangelical Lutheran Church in India are:

- Andhra Evangelical Lutheran Church
- Arcot Lutheran Church
- Evangelical Lutheran Church in Madhya Pradesh
- Evangelical Lutheran Church in the Himalayan States
- Gossner Evangelical Lutheran Church in Chotanagpur and Assam
- Indian Evangelical Lutheran Church
- Jeypore Evangelical Lutheran Church
- Northern Evangelical Lutheran Church
- South Andhra Lutheran Church
- Tamil Evangelical Lutheran Church

== See also ==
- Adivasi
- Christianity in India
