= Kapari =

Kapari may refer to:

- Kapari (village) in Kerman Province, Iran
- Kapari (magazine), published from Telangana, India
- Kapari or Kapu, a title for fictional tribal chiefs in the 2023 Indian film Salaar
