= Solomon Raj =

Solomon Raj may refer to:

- P. Solomon Raj, AELC, a Pastor of the Andhra Evangelical Lutheran Church Society,
- Solomon Rajah, TELC, a Pastor of the Evangelical Lutheran Church in Malaysia Society,
- A. C. Solomon Raj, CSI, a Pastor and now Bishop of the Church of South India Society,
