= A. N. Gopal =

A. N. Gopal, AELC
- The Reverend Doctor
- Church: Lutheran
- Diocese: Synods of East Godavari, West Godavari, East Guntur, West Guntur, Central Guntur
- See: Andhra Evangelical Lutheran Church (AELC)
- In office: 1951–1955
- Predecessor: E. Prakasam
- Successor: G. Devasahayam
- Previous posts: Pastor, Andhra Evangelical Lutheran Church Society

Personal details
- Born: Andhra Pradesh, India
- Died: Guntur, Andhra Pradesh, India

A. N. Gopal was the second Indian President of the Protestant Andhra Evangelical Lutheran Church Society and served from 1951 to 1955. On completion of his term, he was assigned the responsibility of president of the Lutheran Theological College, Rajahmundry.

Apart from his primary responsibility to the Andhra Evangelical Lutheran Church Society, he also served in an honorary capacity as president of the United Evangelical Lutheran Churches in India (formerly Federation of Evangelical Lutheran Churches in India).

In 1955 when Gopal successfully completed a term as president of the Andhra Evangelical Lutheran Church, he went on study leave to the Lutheran School of Theology at Chicago, where he underwent postgraduate studies in theology. On his return, he was assigned to the Lutheran Theological College, Rajahmundry.

In 1963, Gopal accepted the position as principal of the Voorhees College (India) in Vellore, Tamil Nadu, the same college where Sarvepalli Radhakrishnan had once studied.

Religious titles
Preceded by E. Prakasam; 1944-1950	President; Andhra Evangelical Lutheran Church; 1951-1955	Succeeded by G. Devasahayam; 1956–1960
Preceded by	President; Lutheran Theological College, Rajahmundry; 1956-1963	Succeeded by
Honorary titles
Preceded by Raja B. Manickam; 1954-1960	President; United Evangelical Lutheran Churches in India (formerly the Federation of Evangelical Lutheran Churches in India); 1960-1963	Succeeded by Raja B. Manikam; 1963-1966
Academic offices
Preceded by	Principal; Voorhees College (India), Vellore; 1963-1972	Succeeded by
