= Theodore N. Swanson =

American clergyman and Old Testament scholar

The Reverend Doctor Theodore N. Swanson ELCA
- Born: Theodore Norman Swanson; United States
- Education: B.A., S.T.M., M.A., Ph.D.
- Alma mater: Augustana College, Andover Newton Theological School, Vanderbilt University
- Occupations: Pastor and Teacher
- Church: Evangelical Lutheran Church in America (Grand Canyon Synod)
- Congregations served: Chicago and Boston
- Offices held: Teacher - in - Old Testament, United Theological College, Bangalore (1979-1994)
- Title: The Reverend Doctor

Theodore N. Swanson, an ordained Pastor of the Evangelical Lutheran Church in America is an Old Testament Scholar. Swanson taught Old Testament at the United Theological College, Bangalore, India.

Swanson's writings on the canon of the Old Testament has gathered scholarly reviews. In 2000, Stephen B. Chapman, an Old Testament Scholar at the Duke Divinity School has substantially referred to the work of Swanson.

== Writings ==
- 1970, The closing of the collection of Holy Scriptures: A study in the history of the canonization of the Old Testament,
- 1982, When the time had fully come : a study of the intertestamental period,
- 1982, The Apocalyptic Scriptures,
- 1986 (with Terence Y. Mullins), The kings of Israel,
- 1993, Christianity and World Religions: A Biblical Understanding,
- 2012, Augustana's Biblical Heritage,
- 2013, Preacher as Teacher,

== Studies ==
Swanson studied at the Augustana College graduate first in 1950 and again in 1954. Swanson also studied at the Andover Newton Theological School and at the Vanderbilt University for further theological studies.

== Teaching ==
Starting in the 1980s, Swanson taught Old Testament at the United Theological College, Bangalore. Among the postgraduate students who specialized in Old Testament and taught at seminaries elsewhere were,

- 1978-1980, Geevarghese Mathew, MMTSC, at the Mar Thoma Theological Seminary, Kottayam,
- 1979-1981, G. D. V. Prasad, CSI, at the Bishop’s College, Calcutta,
- 1980-1982, D. Jones Muthunayagom, CSI, at the Tamil Nadu Theological Seminary, Madurai and later at United Theological College, Bangalore,
- 1980-1982, James Vijayakumar, at the United Theological College, Bangalore,
- 1981-1983, Mani Chacko, CSI, at the Gurukul Lutheran Theological College, Chennai,
- 1985-1987, M. Prithvi Raju, AELC, at the Andhra Evangelical Lutheran Church Seminary in Rajahmundry,
- 1986-1988, Ch. Victor Moses, AELC, at the Gurukul Lutheran Theological College, Chennai,
- 1986-1988, N. V. Luther Paul, AELC, at the Andhra Christian Theological College, Secunderabad,
- 1987-1989, D. John Samuel Ponnusamy, CSI, at the Tamil Nadu Theological Seminary, Madurai,
- 1987-1989, J. R. John Samuel Raj, CSI, at the Kerala United Theological Seminary, Trivandrum and later at the United Theological College, Bangalore,

Academic offices
Preceded by G. M. Butterworth, Gerhard Wehmeier	Teacher - in - Old Testament; United Theological College, Bangalore; 1979-1994	Succeeded by D. N. Premnath
