= Daniel D. Chetti =

Italian theologian

Daniel Divaker Chetti
- Born: India
- Education: B.A., Azusa Pacific University, M.A., Claremont Graduate University, Ph.D., Claremont Graduate University
- Occupation: Theologian
- Church: Baptist
- Title: Professor

Daniel Divaker Chetti is professor at the Arab Baptist Theological Seminary. Daniel Chetti was known for his contribution as Director of Programmes and Church Relations at the Board of Theological Education of the Senate of Serampore College in Bangalore as well as at the Gurukul Lutheran Theological College, Chennai. He was educated at La Martiniere, Calcutta, where he was a House Captain.

Chetti's doctoral work on Khonds has been kept for posterity at the National Library, Kolkata.

== Writings ==
- 1986, A history of the Meriah Wars, 1836-1862 : policies and personalities in the evolution of British moral imperative among the Khonds of Orissa,
- 1989 (Edited with Aravind P. Nirmal), Adventurous faith & transforming vision,
- 1989, Making Visible: The Role of Women in the Nineteenth Century Protestant Christianity in India
- 1996, Ecology and Development: Theological Perspectives,
- 1998 (Edited with M. P. Joseph), Ethical issues in the struggles for justice : quest for pluriform communities : essays in honour of K.C. Abraham,

Academic offices
Preceded by H. S. Wilson; 1980-1988	Director of Programmes and Church Relations, Board of Theological Education of the Senate of Serampore College; 1988-	Succeeded by V. Devasahayam
