= Ch. Victor Moses =

Indian clergyman and Old Testament scholar

- The Reverend
- Church: Lutheran
- Diocese: Synods of East Godavari, West Godavari, East Guntur, West Guntur, Central Guntur
- See: Andhra Evangelical Lutheran Church (AELC)
- In office: 2001-2005
- Predecessor: N. Ch. Joseph
- Successor: V. E. Christopher

Personal details
- Born: Andhra Pradesh, India

Ch. Victor Moses is President Emeritus of the Protestant Andhra Evangelical Lutheran Church Society headquartered in Guntur. Victor Moses is an Old Testament Scholar and a member of the Society for Biblical Studies, India, an august body of learning having members well versed in Hebrew and Greek languages hailing from the Protestant, Catholic, Orthodox and Pentecostal traditions.

As an Old Testament Scholar, Victor Moses was made a member of the Bible Society of India Andhra Pradesh Auxiliary Old Testament Translation Panel headed by the Old Testament Scholars, Victor Premasagar and G. Babu Rao that oversaw the common language translation in Telugu.

Victor Moses currently leads the Pastoral team at the historical AELC St. Matthew's West Parish. Victor Moses also teaches Sacred Scriptures at the Bethel Bible College, Guntur.

== Studies ==
Victor Moses had his spiritual formation at the Protestant Andhra Christian Theological College, Hyderabad, a Seminary affiliated to India's first University, the Senate of Serampore College (University), a Section 2(f) University within the meaning of the University Grants Commission. The Andhra Evangelical Lutheran Church Society under the aegis of its President, S. W. Schmitthenner was instrumental in sending Victor Moses for spiritual formation at the Protestant Seminary where Victor Moses had developed interest in the Sacred Scriptures, especially the Old Testament after being groomed by Victor Premasagar and G. Babu Rao, then Old Testament Scholars at the Protestant Seminary. Other Spiritual Formators at the Protestant Seminary where Victor Moses studied included Ravela Joseph and M. Victor Paul.

Subsequently, Victor Moses was assigned pastoral roles in the Andhra Evangelical Lutheran Church Society. Later, the Church Society sent Victor Moses in 1986 to the United Theological College, Bangalore where Victor Moses undertook postgraduate studies specializing in Old Testament under Theodore N. Swanson and E. C. John and D. N. Premnath working out a dissertation entitled The concept of remnant in the prophetical books of the Old Testament. By 1988, Victor Moses returned to take up ecclesiastical duties with the Andhra Evangelical Lutheran Church Society.

== Teaching and academics ==
The Gurukul Lutheran Theological College, affiliated to the Senate of Serampore College (University) invited Victor Moses to teach Old Testament. The Andhra Evangelical Lutheran Church Society had accorded leave-on-lien to Victor Moses to enable him to take up a teaching assignment.

Victor Moses has authored homiletical books in Telugu,

- Prabhu Sandesa Maalika (2008),
- Daiva Sandesa Sumaalu (2012).

Victor Moses has written scholarly articles for the Gurukul Journal of Theological Studies, which include,

- Affluence through Oppression: Socio-Economic and Religio-Political Policies of Solomon, (1990)

== Church matters and subsequent election ==
During his teaching assignment at the Gurukul Lutheran Theological College, Chennai, Victor Moses expressed his desire to take up pastoral roles after which he was assigned the duty of Pastor at the Lutheran Church, Chirala.

Religious titles
Preceded by N. Ch. Joseph; 2000-2001	President; Andhra Evangelical Lutheran Church; 2001-2005	Succeeded by V. E. Christopher; 2005-2009
Academic offices
Preceded by	Associate Professor of Old Testament; Gurukul Lutheran Theological College	Succeeded by Thomas Babu
