= K. Frederick Paradesi Babu =

K. Frederick Paradesi Babu, AELC President Emeritus, Andhra Evangelical Lutheran Church Society
- Moderator/Bishop
- Church: Andhra Evangelical Lutheran Church Society
- Elected: 2013
- Installed: 2013
- Term ended: 2025
- Predecessor: B. Suneel Bhanu, AELC
- Successor: Incumbent
- Other posts: Council Member, Christian Medical College Vellore; President, Andhra Christian College, Guntur; President, Andhra Lutheran College of Education, Guntur; President, Andhra Pradesh Council of Churches; Vice Chairperson, Board of Governors, Andhra Christian Theological College, Secunderabad, Telangana
- Previous posts: West Godavari Synod of Andhra Evangelical Lutheran Church Society; Chairperson, Andhra Christian Theological College, Secunderabad; President, Federation of Telugu Churches

Orders
- Rank: Bishop

Personal details
- Born: Kollabathula Frederick Paradesi Babu Andhra Pradesh
- Residence: Becker Compound, Guntur
- Occupation: Priesthood
- Education: B.D. (Serampore)
- Alma mater: Hindustan Bible Institute, Chennai, Andhra Christian Theological College, Secunderabad

K. Frederick Paradesi Babu is President Emeritus of Protestant Andhra Evangelical Lutheran Church Society. He had his ministerial formation at the Andhra Christian Theological College, Hyderabad, a Seminary affiliated to the nation's first university, the Senate of Serampore College (University).

Paradesi Babu happens to be the present Chairperson of the Board of Governors of his alma mater, the Andhra Christian Theological College, Hyderabad, a near-ecumenical (Catholics excluded) Protestant Regional Seminary managed by the following multi-State Church societies, namely,

- Andhra Pradesh-based Protestant Church societies
  - Andhra Evangelical Lutheran Church Society headquartered in Guntur,
  - Church of South India, Dioceses of Krishna-Godavari, Nandyal, Rayalaseema headquartered in Machilipatnam, Nandyal and Kadapa respectively,
  - Convention of Baptist Churches of Northern Circars Society headquartered in Kakinada,
  - Samavesam of Telugu Baptist Churches Society, headquartered in Nellore,
  - South Andhra Lutheran Church Society, headquartered in Tirupati,
- Tamil Nadu-based Protestant Church society
  - Church of South India, Diocese of Madras (in Tamil Nadu State) headquartered in Chennai,
- Telangana-based Protestant Church societies
  - Church of South India Dioceses of Dornakal, Karimnagar, Medak headquartered in Dornakal, Karimnagar and Medak respectively,
  - Good Samaritan Evangelical Lutheran Church Society headquartered in Bhadrachalam,
  - Methodist Church in India, Hyderabad Regional Conference, headquartered in Hyderabad,

Religious titles
Preceded by B. Suneel Bhanu; 2009-2013	President; Andhra Evangelical Lutheran Church; 2013-2025	Succeeded by Incumbent
Honorary titles
Preceded by R. R. D. Sajeeva Raju, STBC, 2011-2013	Chairperson, Board of Governors, Andhra Christian Theological College, Hyderabad; 2013-2015	Succeeded by Incumbent
Preceded by G. Dyvasirvadam, CSI	President, Federation of Telugu Churches; 2018-2022	Succeeded by T. Joseph Raja Rao, SMM
