= V. E. Christopher =

Indian bishop

V. E. Christopher, AELC
- Moderator / Bishop
- Church: Christian
- See: Andhra Evangelical Lutheran Church (AELC)
- In office: 2005–2009
- Predecessor: Ch. Victor Moses
- Successor: B. Suneel Bhanu
- Previous post: Vice-President of the AELC

Orders
- Ordination: 1978
- Consecration: 1 June 2005

Personal details
- Born: 19 January 1949 (age 77) Bhimavaram, Andhra Pradesh

V. E. Christopher is President Emeritus of the Protestant Lutheran Church Society, the Andhra Evangelical Lutheran Church.

== Early years ==
Ernest Christopher was born into a pastoral family in Bhimavaram in Andhra Pradesh to Rev. Vardanapu Krupadas and Smt. Bhagyamma. His father, Rev. V. Krupadas was a pastor of the AELC. He had his schooling in Bhimavaram and collegiate education in Rajahmundry. Later, he pursued degree studies in Sri Y. N. College (an NAAC-A grade college affiliated to the Andhra University), Narsapur in West Godavari District.

== Divinity ==
Like his father, Christopher had an inclination to pursue the ultimate profession of priesthood. His Church society (the Andhra Evangelical Lutheran Church) readily sponsored him for his priestly studies. The AELC was then headed by Rev. Dr. S. W. Schmitthener.

Armed with a sponsorship letter from his Church society, Christopher enrolled for the graduate degree of Bachelor of Theology (B. Th.) offered by the ecumenical Andhra Christian Theological College (affiliated to the Senate of Serampore College (University)), Hyderabad. Later, the Senate of Serampore College (University) under the Registrarship of D. S. Satyaranjan awarded him with a degree.

The then principal of the college was the Cantabrigian Victor Premasagar. With disciplined faculty at ACTC, the young Christopher had a sound priestly formation. He was taught New Testament by Muriel Carder and K. David while Victor Premasagar and G. Babu Rao, taught him Old Testament, the core subjects in any seminary or theological faculty of a university. Christopher was known to be studious and disciplined.

== Ordination and pastorship ==
After Christopher's ordination, his church president, the India-born Rev. Dr. S. W. Schmitthener posted him to East Godavari District to minister in a rural parish. He also served in Lutheran parishes in Rajahmundry and Bhimavaram.

== Higher studies ==
Christopher later enrolled for the degree of Bachelor of Divinity (B. D.) at his alma mater, the Andhra Christian Theological College, Hyderabad and upgraded himself to earn a B. D. degree.

== Synod of the AELC ==
Rev. Christopher was twice elected as the synod president of the West Godavari Synod, one of the six Synods of the AELC.

== Presidentship ==
In due course of time, Christopher was elected to the vice-presidency of the Church Society. Later on 1 June 2005, he was declared elected as the president of the Andhra Evangelical Lutheran Church.

Religious titles
Preceded by Ch. Victor Moses	President, Andhra Evangelical Lutheran Church; 2005–2009	Succeeded by B. Suneel Bhanu
Honorary titles
Preceded by C. L. Johnson, CBCNC, 2005-2007	Chairperson, Board of Governors, Andhra Christian Theological College, Hyderabad; 2007-2009	Succeeded by P. Surya Prakash, CSI; 2009-2011
