= J. I. Richardson =

The Reverend Joseph Irvin Richardson Ayyagaru
- The Reverend
- Church: Protestant
- See: Canadian Baptist Ministries and Convention of Baptist Churches of Northern Circars
- Elected: 1958
- In office: 1958
- Predecessor: Rev. D. R. Issac, CBCNC
- Successor: Rev. A. B. Masilamani, CBCNC

Orders
- Ordination: by Canadian Baptist Ministries
- Rank: Pastor

Personal details
- Denomination: Christianity
- Occupation: Pastor, Lecturer and Ecclesiastical Administrator
- Profession: Priesthood
- Education: B.A., B.D., S.T.M.
- Alma mater: McMaster University, Hamilton, Ontario and Union Theological Seminary (New York City)

J. I. Richardson was a Baptist Pastor who served as a missionary in India through the Canadian Baptist Ministries.

Richardson came to India in 1945 and after more than a decade and half he was elected President of Convention of Baptist Churches of Northern Circars in 1958 In the continuing year, Richardson was replaced by Rev. A. B. Masilamani.

After a period of missionary service in India, Richardson returned to Canada and in 1961 became Dean of Carey Hall at the University of British Columbia. In addition to his responsibilities as Dean of Carey Hall, Richardson was also Chaplain to the University of British Columbia as well as Lecturer of Oriental Religions.

Honorary titles
Preceded by D. R. Issac	President, CBCNC, Kakinada; 1958	Succeeded by A. B. Masilamani; 1959
