= South Andhra Lutheran Church =

Christian denomination in India

South Andhra Lutheran Church is a Christian denomination in India. It is Telugu-speaking. It is led by Bishop Rt.Rev.Michael Babu. It has tens of thousands of members. It belongs to the Lutheran World Federation.. The other churches belonging to the United Evangelical Lutheran Church in India are:

- Andhra Evangelical Lutheran Church
- Arcot Lutheran Church
- Evangelical Lutheran Church in Madhya Pradesh
- Evangelical Lutheran Church in the Himalayan States
- Good Samaritan Evangelical Lutheran Church
- Gossner Evangelical Lutheran Church in Chotanagpur and Assam
- Indian Evangelical Lutheran Church
- Jeypore Evangelical Lutheran Church
- Northern Evangelical Lutheran Church
- Tamil Evangelical Lutheran Church

== See also ==
- Christianity in Andhra Pradesh
- Lutheran Churches in Andhra Pradesh
