= K. Krupadanam =

Indian Christian theologian

K. Krupadanam, AELC
- The Reverend
- Church: Lutheran
- Diocese: Synods of East Godavari, West Godavari, East Guntur, West Guntur, Central Guntur
- See: Andhra Evangelical Lutheran Church (AELC)
- In office: 1961–1962
- Predecessor: G. Devasahayam
- Successor: G. Devasahayam
- Previous posts: Professor, Lutheran Theological College, Rajahmundry

Personal details
- Born: Andhra Pradesh, India
- Died: Andhra Pradesh, India

K. Krupadanam was the Indian President of the Protestant Andhra Evangelical Lutheran Church Society and served for a short period from 1961 to 1962. His tenure was embroiled in a legal wrangle but ultimately the AELC Church Society won the case.

As part of the continuing dialogue between the newly formed Church of South India and the other Protestant Churches, Krupadanam along with William P. Peery were involved in the negotiations.

Religious titles
Preceded by G. Devasahayam; 1961-1962	President; Andhra Evangelical Lutheran Church; 1961-1962	Succeeded by G. Devasahayam; 1963-1964
