= N. Ch. Joseph =

- The Reverend
- Church: Lutheran
- Diocese: Synods of East Godavari, West Godavari, East Guntur, West Guntur, Central Guntur
- See: Andhra Evangelical Lutheran Church (AELC)
- In office: 2000-2001
- Predecessor: G. Emmanuel
- Successor: Ch. Victor Moses
- Previous posts: Pastor, Andhra Evangelical Lutheran Church Society

Personal details
- Born: Andhra Pradesh, India

N. Ch. Joseph was the President of the Protestant Andhra Evangelical Lutheran Church Society.

Although Joseph's period was short-lived, he undertook the mantle of the President to instill confidence in the ecclesiastical community.

N. Ch. Joseph belonged to the senior clergy of the Andhra Evangelical Lutheran Church Society. The Madras Journal of Cooperation lists out his name as early as 1946 itself.

Religious titles
Preceded by G. Emmanuel; 1997-2000	President; Andhra Evangelical Lutheran Church; 2000-2001	Succeeded by Ch. Victor Moses; 2001-2005
