= A. D. Matheson =

The Reverend Arthur Daniel Matheson Ayyagaru
- The Reverend
- Church: Protestant
- See: Canadian Baptist Ministries and Convention of Baptist Churches of Northern Circars
- Elected: 1960
- In office: 1960
- Predecessor: Rev. A. B. Masilamani
- Successor: Rev. M. L. Moses

Orders
- Ordination: by Canadian Baptist Ministries
- Rank: Pastor

Personal details
- Denomination: Christianity
- Occupation: Pastor, Lecturer and Ecclesiastical Administrator
- Profession: Priesthood
- Education: B.A., B.Th.

Arthur D. Matheson was a Baptist Pastor who served as a missionary in India from 1920 through 1965 as part of the overseas missionary endeavour of the Canadian Baptist Ministries.

After a four-decade missionary service, Matheson was elected in 1960 as the President of the Convention of Baptist Churches of Northern Circars succeeding A. B. Masilamani.

After nearly five decades of missionary service in India, Matheson left for Canada in 1966.

Honorary titles
Preceded by A. B. Masilamani; 1959	President, CBCNC, Kakinada; 1960	Succeeded by M. L. Moses; 1961
