= Kugler Hospital =

- Karunya Healthcare & Academic Foundation

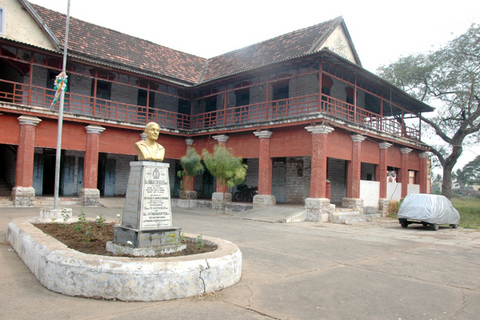
- Kugler Hospital

Geography
- Location: Guntur, Guntur district, Andhra Pradesh, India

Organisation
- Care system: Private
- Type: Super-Specialty

Services
- Beds: 150 beds

History
- Founded: 22 June 1897
- Closed: 2010 (for Renovation)

Links
- Lists: Hospitals in India

Kugler Hospital is a Landmark of Guntur City. Dr. Anna Sarah Kugler arrived in Guntur, India, Andhra Pradesh, in November 1883. With very few funds, and working as a teacher part-time, she started a small dispensary and began planning for a hospital for women. Her dream was realized as the American Evangelical Lutheran Mission Hospital, Guntur, India, which opened on 22 June 1897. The 50-bed hospital was established on an 18-acre (7.3 ha) campus and was considered one of the best in India, with surgical facilities, maternity and children's wards, and a nursing school. Dr. Kugler died in Guntur on 26 July 1930 and shortly after her death the hospital was renamed Kugler Hospital.

In addition to being the first women's hospital in the entire coastal belt of Andhra Pradesh, Kugler Hospital is notable for being established and administered almost entirely by women. Mary Baer took over as acting superintendent for the hospital when Dr. Kugler went on furlough. Ms. Katherine Fahs founded the nurses training program in 1899. The longest serving superintendent was Dr. Sarala Elisha. The hospital chapel, the Zimmerman Memorial Chapel, was donated by Mrs. Jeremiah Zimmerman, an American, in 1906. When, in 1911, the maternity block was severely damaged and a new one was needed, the Women’s Convention at York, Pennsylvania pledged $5,000 and made the Maternity and Surgical Block possible. In 1911, a children’s ward was donated by Mrs. Mary C. Hencken of New York.

The hospital was once one of the most popular hospitals in the region. On 23 February 2010, it was leased from the Andhra Evangelical Lutheran Church (AELC) by M/s Karunya Healthcare & Academic Foundation who plan to renovate and modernise the hospital.

On 19 April 2010, Dr. Kugler's birth anniversary, M/s Karunya Healthcare & Academic Foundation held a prayer ceremony to bless the work of renovation and the re-opening of the hospital. The function was presided over by the then President of the AELC, the Rev. Dr. Suneel Bhanu and well attended by various dignitaries. In the function M/s Karunya Healthcare & Academic Foundation stated that the hospital will balance the continued commitment to the care of the poor and those most in need with the provision of highly specialized services to a broader community.
