= M. Mani Chacko =

Indian Old Testament scholar

The Reverend Doctor Mani Chacko, CSI Ayyagaru
- Born: Modayil Mani Chacko; 23 February 1955 (age 70); Kottayam, Travancore–Cochin
- Education: B.D. (Serampore) (1979); M.Th. (Serampore) (1983); PhD (King's College) (1990)
- Alma mater: United Theological College, Bangalore (1975-1979/1981-1983); King's College London (United Kingdom) (1986–1990)
- Occupation: Priest
- Years active: 1979–present
- Known for: Old Testament scholarship and able administration
- Parent(s): Smt. Thankamma (Mother) and Bishop M. C. Mani (Father)
- Religion: Christianity
- Church: Church of South India (A Uniting church comprising Wesleyan Methodist, Congregational, Presbyterian and Anglican missionary societies – ABCFM, SPG, WMMS, LMS, Basel Mission, CMS, and the Church of England)
- Ordained: 1987
- Writings: 1983, The theological understanding of the land in Deuteronomy. 2002, Liberation And Service Of God
- Congregations served: Kolkata, Chennai and London
- Offices held: Pastor, Church of South India (1979–1981); Teacher, Serampore College, Serampore (West Bengal) (1983–1986); Teacher, Gurukul Lutheran Theological College, Chennai (1990–2006); Director, Ecumenical Christian Centre, Bangalore (2006–2011); General Secretary, Bible Society of India, Bangalore (2011–2023)
- Title: The Reverend Doctor

Modayil Mani Chacko (born 1955) is an Old Testament scholar and a management consultant. In a career spanning over four decades from the eighties, his roles included ministering, teaching, directing and managing largescale human resources in educational, goodwill-promoting and literary organisations with a pan-Indian presence.

== Spiritual formation ==
=== Karnataka ===
Mani Chacko had his initial ministerial formation from 1975 to 1979 at the United Theological College, Bangalore, affiliated to the nation's first University, the Senate of Serampore College (University), under the Principalship of Joshua Russell Chandran where he studied a graduate course, Bachelor of Divinity.

After a brief pastoral ministry, Chacko returned to the Seminary and registered for a postgraduate course, Master of Theology which he studied from 1981 to 1983 specialising in Old Testament under Theodore N. Swanson and E. C. John working out a dissertation entitled The theological understanding of the land in Deuteronomy under guidance of Rudolf Ficker. Both the graduate and post-graduate degrees were awarded by the University in successive convocations during the Registrarship of D. S. Satyaranjan.

=== England ===
Chacko underwent research studies in Old Testament at the King's College London and returned to India in 1990. While at the London University, Chacko studied under the Old Testament Scholar, Ronald E. Clements and later published his thesis in book form in 2002 with the title, Liberation And Service Of God.

== Ecclesiastical career ==
=== West Bengal ===
Mani Chacko was taken as faculty member on Serampore College, Serampore (West Bengal) from academic year 1983–1984 onwards, where he began to teach Old Testament, also providing his guidance to Scholars studying in North India Institute of Post Graduate Theological Studies. After a three-year teaching period, Chacko took study leave in 1986 and proceeded for doctoral studies to King's College, London to upgrade his studies.

=== Tamil Nadu ===
From 1990 onwards, Chacko began to teach Old Testament at the Gurukul Lutheran Theological College, Chennai. At one point of time, Victor Premasagar also began teaching at the Seminary as Professor Emeritus thereby increasing the research potential of the Seminary. In 2001, Chacko was appointed as Principal of the Seminary, a post which he held until 2006 when he moved over to the Ecumenical Christian Centre, Bangalore to take up its Directorship.

=== Karnataka ===
Following the change of helm at the Ecumenical Christian Centre, Bangalore in 2006, Chacko succeeded M. J. Joseph and served up to 2011 as its Director and then moved out to the Bible Society of India when its General Secretary, B. K. Pramanik stepped down after his extended superannuation came to an end resulting in his appointment as the General Secretary. He was installed on 13 September 2011 at the CSI-St. Mark's Cathedral, Bangalore by the Bible Society of India Trust Association led by its President Navamani Elia Peter in the presence of a host of clergy, G. Dyvasirvadam, John S. Sadananda, G. D. V. Prasad, Robert R. Cunville, Joseph Mar Thoma, Ignatius Paul Pinto and others.

Other offices
Preceded by B. K. Pramanik^{Laity} 1985–2011	General Secretary, Bible Society of India, Bangalore; 2011–2023	Succeeded by Kavito G. Zhimo, CBCNEI
Educational offices
Preceded by M. J. Joseph, MMTSC; 1997-2006	Director, Ecumenical Christian Centre, Bangalore; 2006–2011	Succeeded by Cherian Thomas, MMTSC; 2011–2016
Academic offices
Preceded by D. W. Jesudoss, TELC; 1992–2001	Principal, Gurukul Lutheran Theological College, Chennai; 2001–2006	Succeeded by S. W. Meshack, IELC; 2006–2011
