= D. W. Jesudoss =

Indian university administrator (1939–2024)

The Reverend Devasahayam William Jesudoss, TELC Spiritual Formator/*Principal: →Gurukul Lutheran Theological College and Research Institute, Chennai (1985-2004/*1985-86 & *1988-97) →Tamil Nadu Theological Seminary, Madurai (1973-78, 1983-85) Parish Priest: TELC Churches in Arulpuram (1966), Coimbatore (1967) and Tiruchirappalli (1968)
- Born: October 13, 1939, Madras Presidency
- Died: April 10, 2024 (aged 84), Tamil Nadu
- Education: B.A. (Madras), B.D. & M.Th. (Serampore), Dr.Theol. (Erlangen)
- Alma mater: Scott Christian College, Nagercoil; Gurukul Lutheran Theological College, Madras; United Theological College, Bangalore; Friedrich-Alexander University of Erlangen-Nuremberg, Erlangen
- Occupation: Priesthood
- Years active: 1966-2024
- Known for: Parish care & priestly formation
- Children: The Rev. Santhosh Sahayadoss
- Parent(s): Smt. Jayaseeli and Sri D. Devasagayam
- Church: Tamil Evangelical Lutheran Church (TELC)
- Ordained: July 9, 1966

D. W. Jesudoss (13 October 1939 – 10 April 2024) was the Principal during the years' 1985-1986 and 1988-1997 at Gurukul Lutheran Theological College, Chennai, affiliated to the nation's first University, the Senate of Serampore College (University).

== Studies ==
=== Graduate ===
Jesudoss graduated from the Gurukul Lutheran Theological College, Madras in 1965 earning a Bachelor of Divinity degree conferred by the Senate of Serampore College (University).

=== Postgraduate ===
Jesudoss enrolled for a postgraduate degree at the United Theological College, Bangalore from 1970-1971, affiliated to the nation's first University, the Senate of Serampore College (University), under the Principalship of Joshua Russell Chandran, studying together with R. Yesurathnam, where he obtained a Master of Theology and working out a dissertation entitled A study of Luther's concept of the bondage of the will and its relevance for the interpretation of man in India today and later awarded a degree by the University under the Registrarship of Chetti Devasahayam.

=== Doctoral ===
For further research studies, Jesudoss went to the University of Erlangen where he submitted a dissertation in 1986 entitled What is man?: theological attempts and directions towards the formation of an Indian Christian anthropology for today

== Writings ==
- 1984, Das Menschenbild in der Bhagavadgita und der Bibel (in German),
- 1985, Stärke und Nutzen der Kultur (in German),
- 1986, What is man?: theological attempts and directions towards the formation of an Indian Christian anthropology for today,
- 1987, Towards a bold theological vision: souvenir released on the occasion of the diamond jubilee celebrations,
- 1987, Reflections on the Paper Presented by Dr. Daniel Chetti on ‘Luther’s Doctrine of the Church’,
- 1988, Luther’s Concept of the Two Kingdoms,
- 1988, The Rise and Growth of Dalit Movement; an Offshoot or Solution to the Age-Old Caste Problem of India,
- 1989, Violence, non-violence,
- 1989, The Concept of the Church. A Lutheran Perspective,
- 1990, Justificação pela Fé e Missão num Contexto Multirreligioso e Multicultural (in Portuguese)
- 2008, The Present Scenario of Christians vis-a-vis People of Other Faiths in India,

== Career ==
During his Career (1966-2024), he was Parish Priest of TELC Churches in Arulpuram (1966), Coimbatore (1967) and Tiruchirappalli (1968) and Spiritual Formator at Tamil Nadu Theological Seminary, Madurai (1973-78, 1983-85) and at Gurukul Lutheran Theological College and Research Institute, Chennai (1985-2004).

== Honours ==
In 1999, Samuel W. Meshack, then a member of faculty at the Gurukul Lutheran Theological College, Chennai edited a festschrift in honour of Jesudoss marking the completion of his sixtieth year. The festschrift was entitled Building God's Kingdom on Earth, Writings in Honour of D.W. Jesudoss on His Shastiapthapoorthi.

Academic offices
Preceded by M. Bage, GELC and R. R. Sundara Rao, AELC	Principal, Gurukul Lutheran Theological College and Research Institute, Chennai; 1985-86 and 1988-97	Succeeded by Mani Chacko, CSI; 2001-2006

Further reading

- Naaman Laiser (1990). "Reação à Palestra de D. W. Jesudoss". Estudos Teológicos. 30. ISSN 2237-6461.
- L. E. Sahanam (1997). "Did you Preach Jesus Christ: The Christological Focus in the Writings of Joshua Russell Chandran" (PDF). 39 (2).
- Michael Welker (Edited) (2014). The Depth of the Human Person: A Multidisciplinary Approach. ISBN 978-0-8028-6979-1.
