= Sophia Elizabeth Cook Amos Zimmerman =

- Born: June 23, 1856; Syracuse, New York, United States
- Died: November 23, 1930 (aged 74); Syracuse, New York, United States
- Occupation: Missionary

Sophia Elizabeth Cooks Amos Zimmerman (June 23, 1856 – November 23, 1930) was an American missionary.

== Early life ==
She was born in Syracuse, New York, on June 23, 1856, to real estate magnate Christian Cook and Katherine Hey Cook. She was the eldest of five, with two younger sisters, Emma Margaret Cook and Anna Louise Cook; and two younger brothers, Charles C. Cook and George C. Cook. She married the son of her brother's business partner, Charles L. Amos, with whom she had three sons Jacob Amos (1878 - 1880, Charles Louis Amos (1880 - 1955) and John Jacob Amos (1882 - 1890). She was widowed on June 27, 1887. She married Rev. Jeremiah Zimmerman on January 21, 1890.

== Career ==
She was the President of the Woman's Missionary Society of the First English Lutheran Church. She was a generous patron of religious and educational institutions, having given large sums to the Guntur Mission, India, the Deaconess Home in Baltimore, Maryland, the Pastor's Fund of the United Lutheran Church and also the Gettysburg Theological Seminary. She died on November 23, 1930. The terms of her will provided for the establishment of a $50,000 trust fund for the Gettysburg College Library, named the Dr. and Mrs. Jeremiah Zimmerman Fund, in 1931.
