= Kapari (magazine) =

Telugu language monthly magazine

- Frequency: Monthly
- Publisher: New Life Associates
- Founder: A. B. Masilamani
- Founded: 1970
- Country: India
- Based in: Hyderabad
- Language: Telugu

Kapari is a religious magazine published monthly in Telugu in Hyderabad and has a reach throughout Andhra Pradesh and Telangana as well as other states among Telugu people.

== Overview ==
The magazine was founded in 1970 by the Baptist preacher, The Rev. Dr. A. B. Masilamani whose name is known all over the two states of Telangana and Andhra Pradesh. The magazine continues to be published to this day. The publisher is New Life Associates.
