= Voorhees College, Vellore =

College in Vellore, Tamil Nadu, India

Voorhees College
- ஊரீசு கல்லூரி
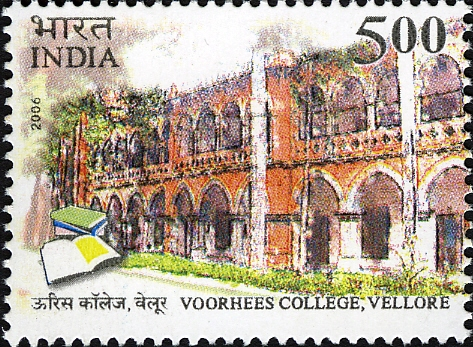
- Former names: Arcot Mission College
- Motto: Nisi Dominus Frustra
- Motto in English: In vain without god
- Established: 1898; 128 years ago
- Affiliations: Thiruvalluvar University, Vellore
- Religious affiliation: The Church of South India – Diocese of Vellore
- Chairman: Rt. Rev. H. Sharma Nithyanandham
- Principal: Dr . J. Annie Kamala Florence
- Location: Vellore, Tamil Nadu, India; 12°54′37.75″N 79°7′55.19″E
- Campus: Urban
- Website: http://www.voorheescollege.edu.in/

Voorhees College is a college in Vellore, Tamil Nadu, India. It was founded in 1898 as Arcot Mission College, when Arcot Mission High School was amalgamated to the University of Madras. The college is named after its benefactors, Mr. and Mrs. Ralph and Elizabeth Voorhees of the Reformed Church in America. The College was earlier known as Ralph and Elizabeth Voorhees college when it was a Co-educational institution. In the late sixties towards the end of the tenure of Dr. A.N. Gopal, the then principal, the college stopped admitting women students and dropped the names Ralph and Elizabeth and became known as Voorhees College. The college began offering master's level courses in 1975. The College is managed by the Church of South India, Diocese of Vellore. The Chairman of the College is the Bishop of Vellore, and the motto is "In vain without God."

The college is affiliated to Thiruvalluvar University, Vellore and it is accredited by the National Assessment and Accreditation Council, with an A grade (2005).

== Notable alumni ==
- Sarvepalli Radhakrishnan – former President of India
- Solomon Pappaiah, professor - a PadmaShri awardee and a world famous Tamil Orator
- Aascar Ravichandran, film producer
- M. C. Rajah

First dalit MP and MLA in India. also Professor of in this college
