= Abraham George Kallarakkal =

Old Testament Biblical scholar

- Born: 1934 (age 90–91); Kerala
- Education: BSc, BD, MTh, DrTheol
- Church: Malankara Orthodox Church
- Title: Reverend Doctor

Abraham George Kallarakkal (born 1934) is an Old Testament Biblical scholar with major contribution to Old Testament research. Kallarakkal is well-versed in Hebrew and Peshitto and researched at the University of Hamburg under Klaus Koch and Manfried Dietrich.

During 1963–1965, George pursued postgraduate studies in Old Testament leading to Master of Theology at one of the affiliated seminaries of the Senate of Serampore College (University).

Abraham George was Professor of Old Testament at the Orthodox Pazhaya Seminary, an institution of the Malankara Orthodox Syrian Church affiliated to the nation's first University, the Senate of Serampore College.

== Writings ==
- 1973, The Peshitto Version of Daniel: A Comparison with the Massoretic Text, the Septuagint and Theodotion
- 1981, Prathyasakiranangal (in Malayalam),
- 1987, The Rays of Hope: An Introduction to the Old Testament,
