= Anna Sarah Kugler =

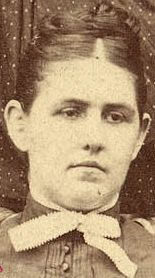
- Born: April 19, 1856; Ardmore, Pennsylvania, U.S.
- Died: July 26, 1930 (aged 74); Guntur, Andhra Pradesh, India
- Occupation: Medical missionary
- Known for: Founding a hospital in Guntur, India, and teaching medicine

Dr. Anna Sarah Kugler (19 April 1856 – 26 July 1930) was the first medical missionary of the Evangelical Lutheran General Synod of the United States of North America. She served in India for 47 years. She founded a hospital in Guntur which was later named for her.

== Early life and education ==
She was born in Ardmore, Pennsylvania, on April 19, 1856, to Charles Kugler and Harriet S. Sheaff. She attended a private school in Bryn Mawr and graduated from Friends' Central High School in Philadelphia. She then attended the Woman's Medical College of Pennsylvania, graduating in 1879. She interned for two years in the Women's Department of the Norristown State Hospital.

== Medical career ==
In 1882 she received a letter from the Reverend Adam D. Rowe, a Lutheran missionary serving in India, suggesting that India urgently needed medical missionaries to serve women. She decided to apply for sponsorship to the Woman's Home and Foreign Missionary Society of the General Synod of the Lutheran Church in America. The Synod board said it was "not yet ready to undertake work of this kind" (i.e., medical mission) but was willing to send her to India as a teacher for Muslim women living in harems. She accepted the assignment because she was sure she could eventually convince the board to establish medical work in India, and she wanted to be in at the beginning. On August 25, 1883, she sailed for India, arriving on November 29, 1883. She was assigned to Guntur in the state of Andhra Pradesh.

In addition to her teaching duties, she practised medicine for the local women, who had previously received only primitive medical care. Her work was hampered by limitations of caste and race - as a white woman she was regarded as "unclean" by high-caste Hindus - but she said, "it was all in the way of opening up the path for those who came later." Despite the restrictions, during her first year in Guntur she treated 185 patients at their homes, and 276 at the Zenana Home where she lived. Her motto was "Ourselves Your Servants for Jesus' Sake."

She continued her teaching and was placed in charge of the Hindu Girls School and the Girls Boarding School. In December 1885 she was finally appointed a medical missionary. She immediately began planning for a hospital and a dispensary. From 1889 to 1891 she was back in the United States on furlough; she used the time to complete her postgraduate work and study hospital-building and equipment. When she returned to India she was able to purchase an 18-acre plot of land with the donations generated by the goodwill she had earned and also with help from her fellow missionaries who collected money for her.

A dispensary was opened on the land in February 1893, and later that year the cornerstone for the American Evangelical Lutheran Mission Hospital was laid. The hospital itself opened on June 23, 1897. It was a 50-bed hospital and was regarded as one of the best in India. Bhuyanga Rao Bahadur of Ellore, a local Raja, became a supporter of Dr. Kugler's work after she treated his wife and delivered their son, and he donated the "Rao Chinnamagari Satram" as a rest-house opposite the hospital, where Hindu families could stay while their relatives were being treated.

In 1895 she was finally released from other mission duties and was able to devote herself full-time to medical work. In addition to her duties at the dispensary and hospital, she worked to open dispensaries in other villages throughout South India; raised funds for a children's ward, maternity ward and operating room in the hospital; and did medical work in Rentachintala.

While on furlough in the United States in 1928, she wrote Guntur Mission Hospital, an autobiography intended as a guide to future medical missionaries.

== Recognition ==
In recognition of her work she was twice (1905 and 1917) awarded the Kaisar-i-Hind Medal, an award of distinction bestowed on civilians of any nationality who rendered services to the British Raj.

She fell ill from exhaustion in 1925 and returned to the United States for two years to recuperate. She then returned to India to carry on her work despite having pernicious anemia. She died at her own hospital in Guntur on July 26, 1930. She was buried in Guntur though there is a memorial to her in the Saint Paul's Lutheran Cemetery in Ardmore, Pennsylvania. Shortly before her death she is reported to have said to Dr. Ida Scudder, her colleague and close associate, "I would like to get well and work longer, for I would like to feel I had served India for fifty years, and I have served only forty-seven." After her death the hospital she had founded was renamed Kugler Hospital in her honor.

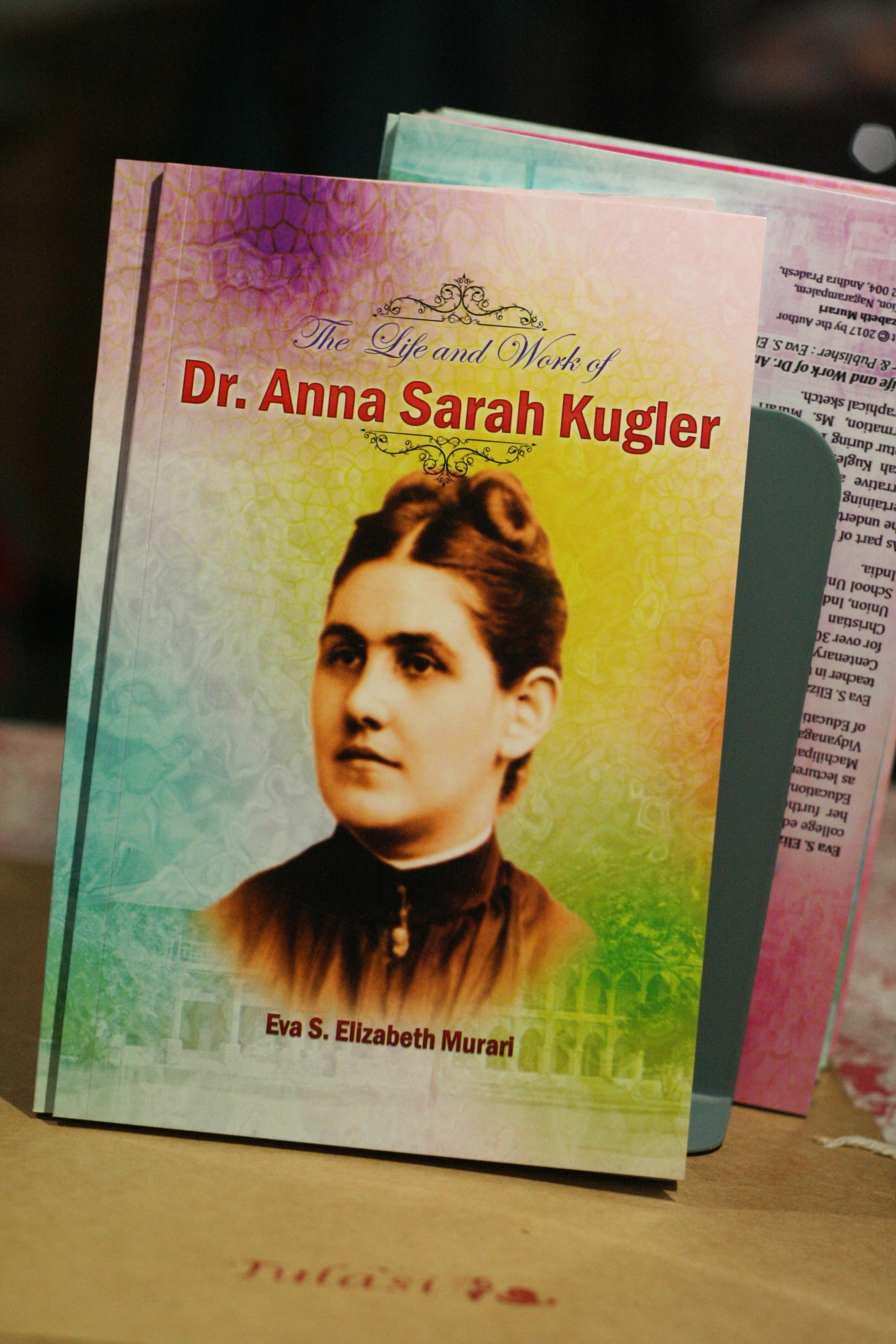
The Life and Work of Dr. Anna Sarah Kugler, new title in 2017 by Eva Sundari Elizabeth.
