= G. Devasahayam =

20th-century Indian President of the Lutheran Church Society

President G. Devasahayam, AELC
- The Reverend Doctor
- Church: Andhra Evangelical Lutheran Church Society
- In office: 1956–1960 and 1963-1964
- Predecessor: A. N. Gopal and K. Krupadanam
- Successor: K. Krupadanam and K. Devasahayam
- Previous posts: Professor, Lutheran Theological College, Rajahmundry (1944-1956), Professor, Andhra Christian Theological College, Rajahmundry/Hyderabad (1964-1972)

Orders
- Rank: Bishop

Personal details
- Born: Garikapudi Devasahayam Madras Presidency, British Raj
- Died: Andhra Pradesh, India
- Denomination: Christianity
- Occupation: Priesthood
- Education: B.A. (Andhra), B.D. (Serampore), S.T.M. (LTSP)
- Alma mater: Andhra Christian College, Guntur, Gurukul Lutheran Theological College, Madras, Lutheran Theological Seminary at Philadelphia, Pennsylvania

G. Devasahayam was the Indian President of the Protestant Andhra Evangelical Lutheran Church Society and served during the periods 1956–1960 and again from 1963–1964. During his second stint as President of the AELC, Devasahayam participated in the opening of the newly formed Andhra Christian Theological College then located in the same campus of the Lutheran Theological College in Rajahmundry.

== Studies ==
Gorikapudi Devasahayam completed his graduate studies at the Lutheran Theological College, Rajahmundry which at that time was directly affiliated to the Senate of Serampore College (University) and was assigned pastoral ministry. Later, Devasahayam was appointed to teach at his alma mater, the Lutheran Theological College in Rajahmundry.

The AELC Society sent Devasahayam on study leave to the Lutheran Theological Seminary at Philadelphia during 1953–1954 where he studied during the period of the eminent human rights specialist, Frederick Nolde. The seminary awarded a postgraduate degree in Master of Sacred Theology (S.T.M.) upon Devasahayam in the succeeding convocation in 1955.

== Ecclesiastical ministry ==
Devasahayam began teaching at the Lutheran Theological College in Rajahmundry from 1944 onwards until his elevation to the Presidency of the Lutheran Society in 1956 and again in 1963 when Devasahayam proceeded to Guntur to take up the responsibilities of the Society. After his second stint as President ended in 1964, Devasahayam returned to Rajahmundry and joined the faculty of the newly formed Andhra Christian Theological College, a Protestant Regional Theologiate that included the Anglicans, Baptists, Congregationalists, Lutherans, Methodists and Wesleyans.

During the time as Professor in Rajahmundry, Devasahayam also served as a Pastor of St. Paul's Lutheran Church in Rajahmundry from 1947–1950.

== Reminisce ==
Talathoti Punnaiah who studied a 3-year theology course leading to Bachelor of Theology at the Andhra Christian Theological College, both at Rajahmundry and at Hyderabad from 1970–1973 recalls his association with Devasahayam,

Devasahayam was President Emeritus of the AELC who taught us modern religious movements. He was very friendly in the class and used to share his experiences with us. We were blessed to have him as our Professor.

Religious titles
Preceded by A. N. Gopal 1951-1955/ K. Krupadanam 1961-1962	President; Andhra Evangelical Lutheran Church; 1956-1960 and 1963-1964	Succeeded by K. Krupadanam 1961-1962/ K. Devasahayam1965-1969
