= Kapari (village) =

Kapari كپري
- Village
- Location within Iran
- Coordinates: 27°47′53″N 58°31′37″E
- Country: Iran
- Province: Kerman
- County: Rudbar-e Jonubi
- Bakhsh: Jazmurian
- Rural District: Jazmurian

Population (2006)
  - Total: 615
- Time zone: UTC+3:30 (IRST)
  - Summer (DST): UTC+4:30 (IRDT)

Kapari (Persian: كپري, also Romanized as Kaparī) is a village in Jazmurian Rural District, Jazmurian District, Rudbar-e Jonubi County, Kerman Province, Iran. At the 2006 census, its population was 615, in 113 families.
