= United Evangelical Lutheran Churches in India =

Communion of Indian Lutheran denominations

United Evangelical Lutheran Churches in India (UELCI) is a communion of twelve Lutheran Christian denominations in India. It has approximately four million members. It is a member of the World Council of Churches, Christian Conference of Asia, the National Council of Churches in India, the ACT Alliance and Lutheran World Federation.

== Members Church ==
- Andhra Evangelical Lutheran Church
- Arcot Lutheran Church
- Evangelical Lutheran Church in Madhya Pradesh
- Evangelical Lutheran Church in the Himalayan States
- Good Samaritan Evangelical Lutheran Church
- Gossner Evangelical Lutheran Church in Chotanagpur and Assam
- India Evangelical Lutheran Church
- Jeypore Evangelical Lutheran Church
- Northern Evangelical Lutheran Church
- South Andhra Lutheran Church
- Tamil Evangelical Lutheran Church
