= B. Suneel Bhanu =

Lutheran diocese

B. Suneel Bhanu, AELC
- The Reverend
- Church: Lutheran
- Diocese: Synods of East Godavari, West Godavari, East Guntur, West Guntur, Central Guntur
- See: Andhra Evangelical Lutheran Church (AELC)
- In office: 2009-2013
- Predecessor: V. E. Christopher
- Successor: K. Frederick Paradesi Babu
- Previous posts: Professor, Gurukul Lutheran Theological College, Chennai

Personal details
- Born: Andhra Pradesh, India

B. Suneel Bhanu is President Emeritus of the Protestant Andhra Evangelical Lutheran Church Society who served a term from 2009 through 2013. At present, Suneel Bhanu teaches at the Gurukul Lutheran Theological College, Chennai.

In 2015, Suneel Bhanu was elected as the Chairperson of Church's Auxiliary for Social Action for the quadrennium 2015-2018.

== Studies and Academics ==
B. Suneel Bhanu studied at the Protestant Andhra Christian Theological College, Hyderabad during the period of the Old Testament Scholars, Victor Premasagar and G. Babu Rao. Later, Bhanu undertook postgraduate studies at the South East Asia Graduate School of Theology from where he was awarded a postgraduate degree of Master of Theology (M.Th.). Suneel Bhanu served as a Pastor of the Emmanuel Lutheran Church in Visakhapatnam.

Suneel Bhanu taught at the Bishop's College, Kolkata before moving to Gurukul Lutheran Theological College, Chennai where he is currently teaching Theology. Suneel Bhanu is a member of the Academic Council of the nation's first University, the Senate of Serampore College (University) in West Bengal.

== Contribution ==
Suneel Bhanu's major contribution was seeing through the publication of the Bibliography of Original Christian Writings in India in Telugu compiled by Ravela Joseph for which Bhanu provided his assistance that ultimately resulted in its publication by the Board of Theological Education of the Senate of Serampore College in 1993 under the aegis of the General Editors, Hunter P. Mabry, H. S. Wilson and Zaihmingthanga.

The compilation by Suneel Bhanu together with Ravela Joseph has been a source referred for original Christian writings in Telugu.

In addition, Suneel Bhanu has also co-translated Robin Boyd's Introduction to Indian Christian Theology along with Victor Premasagar and B. J. Christie Kumar, his Professors at the Andhra Christian Theological College.

== Writings ==
- 2006, Glimpses of the Tercentenary Celebrations of the Arrival of Bartholomaus Ziegenbalf - The Father of Modern Protestant Mission,
- 2009 (with Monodeep Daniel and Indukuri John Mohan Razu)
  - The Letter of Paul to the Ephesians,
  - The Letter of Paul to the Philippians,
  - The Letter of Paul to the Colossians,
  - The first and second Letters of Paul to the Thessalonians,
  - The Letter to the Hebrews

== Other endeavours ==
In 2011, Suneel Bhanu delivered the annual Hein Fry Lecture at the Lutheran Theological Seminary at Philadelphia.

In 2013, Suneel Bhanu participated in the Salvation Army's meetings in Nellore in the presence of D. M. Prakasam of the Roman Catholic Diocese of Nellore which awarded N. L. Victor, the Order of the Founder by Linda Goodman.

Suneel Bhanu was also a member of the Henry Martyn Institute for Interfaith Reconciliation at Hyderabad.

Religious titles
Preceded by V. E. Christopher; 2005-2009	President; Andhra Evangelical Lutheran Church; 2009-2013	Succeeded by K. Frederick Paradesi Babu; 2013-2017
Honorary titles
Preceded by Purely Lyngdoh; 2011-2014	Chairperson; Church's Auxiliary for Social Action; 2015-2018	Succeeded by -
