= Roger E. Hedlund =

American pastor in India (born 1935)

- Born: 1935; Minnesota, United States
- Occupation: Pastor
- Title: The Reverend Doctor

Roger E. Hedlund is an American pastor who has spent more than three decades in India as a theological teacher and researcher with major contributions to missiology with special reference to Indian ethos.

== Education ==
Hedlund studied at the Upland College in 1957 and thereafter undertook theological studies at the Denver Conservative Baptist Seminary where he was awarded the graduate degree of Bachelor of Divinity (B.D.) in 1961. After serving as a missionary in Italy, Hedlund pursued postgraduate and doctoral studies at the Fuller Theological Seminary, Pasadena between 1970 and 1974. In 2004, Hedlund pursued another doctorate at the State-run University of Madras.

== Career ==
Hedlund taught at the Union Biblical Seminary, both at Yavatmal and at Pune from 1974 to 1978 and also at the Serampore College from 1994 to 1997. He is associated with Dharma Deepika: A South Asian Journal of Missiological Research and with the Mylapore Institute for Indigenous Studies (Chennai). Hedlund edited the Oxford Encyclopedia of South Asian Christianity.

Hedlund has been prominent in the theological circles in India and known in the Catholic, Orthodox, Protestant and Charismatic circles serving the cause of missiological research. The papers and correspondence of Roger E. Hedlund have been preserved and made digitally available by the Asbury Theological Seminary, Kentucky.

== Selected works ==
- Hedlund, Roger E (1970). The Protestant movement in Italy; its progress, problems, and prospects. South Pasadena, Calif.: William Carey Library. ISBN 978-0-87808-307-7. OCLC 132850.
- Hedlund, Roger E. (1981). Roots of the Great Debate in Mission. Evangelical Literature Service. OCLC 477724803.
- Hedlund, Roger E (1982). Building the church. Madras, India: Evangelical Literature Service. OCLC 14697911.
- Hedlund, Roger E. (1985). Mission to Man in the Bible. Evangelical Literature Service. OCLC 14174448.
- Hedlund, Roger E. (1992). Evangelization and Church Growth: Issues from the Asian Context. C.G.R.C. McGavran Institute, India. OCLC 1203446266.
- Hedlund, Roger E. (1997). God and the Nations: A Biblical Theology of Mission in the Asian Context. ISPCK. ISBN 978-81-7214-396-1.
- Hedlund, Roger E (2003). The mission of the church in the world: a biblical theology. Eugene, Or.: Wipf and Stock Publishers. OCLC 54070487.
- Hedlund, Roger E. (2000). Quest for Identity: India's Churches of Indigenous Origin: the "Little Tradition" in Indian Christianity. ISPCK. ISBN 978-81-7214-525-5.
- Hedlund, Roger E (2002). Roots of the great debate in mission: mission in historical and theological perspective : revised and enlarged. Bangalore, India: Theological Book Trust. ISBN 978-81-7475-008-2. OCLC 808564613.
- Hedlund, Roger E. (2017). Christianity Made in India: From Apostle Thomas to Mother Teresa. Fortress Press. ISBN 978-1-5064-3033-1.
