= Gurukul Lutheran Theological College =

South Indian theological college

- Type: Seminary
- Established: 1953; 73 years ago
- Affiliation: Senate of Serampore College (University)
- Director: O. Michael Benhur, SALC (Chairperson)
- Principal: Rev Dr Songram Basumatary, NELC
- Location: Chennai, Tamil Nadu, India; 13.0854876°N 80.2465264°E
- Website: gltc.edu

Gurukul Lutheran Theological College and Research Institute is an ecumenical seminary situated in Chennai, Tamil Nadu, South India. It is affiliated to the Senate of Serampore College (University).

== Background ==
The Triennial Conference of the Federation of Evangelical Lutheran Churches in India (later renamed the United Evangelical Lutheran Churches in India - UELCI), which met at Guntur in 1926, felt the need for a theological college for the Lutheran Churches in India. On 6 July 1927 when such a college started, only students from TELC enrolled for the first divinity class. A summer palace bought in 1859 by the Leipzig Evangelical Lutheran Mission from an Indian Raja, became the Centre firstly. Bishop Johannes Sandegren, the first principal of the college, named it Gurukul, meaning a Guru (teacher) living together with his Sishyas (disciples).

Though it was planned at an all-India level it was only in July 1931 that the United Lutheran Theological College (Gurukul) was established with students and staff from South Andhra Lutheran Church (SALC), Andhra Evangelical Lutheran Church (AELC), Church of Sweden Mission (CSwM), Leipzig Evangelical Lutheran Mission (LELM), Danish Missionary Society (DMS) and the Tamil Evangelical Lutheran Church (TELC). Dr. Frolich of LELM was made the principal of this United Lutheran Theological College.

In 1953, Gurukul received a new life with a wider participation of the Lutheran Churches and so was named as Gurukul Lutheran Theological College and Research Institute. The college was then affiliated to the Senate of Serampore College for graduate and postgraduate Studies. Dr. Sigfrid Estborn became its Principal. Then Gurukul merged with the United Theological College, Bangalore and Serampore College, West Bengal in 1971. From then on, Gurukul became a centre for continuing and extension education for the churches in India under the stewardship of Dr. K. Rajaratnam.

== Early years ==
The reopening of Bachelor of Divinity (B.D.) studies at Gurukul by the 20th Triennial Conference held at Madras in 1984 enabled the reviving of the regular B.Div. studies at Gurukul from June 1985. A Bold Theological Vision, as envisioned by Dr. K. Rajaratnam, became the cornerstone of academic activities of the college. In 1987, Master of Theology (Th.M.) studies were introduced in two branches - Christian Theology and Religions. In fifteen years, new branches - Old Testament, New Testament, History of Christianity, Communication, Women's Studies and Missiology were added. By 1999, with the approval of the Senate of Serampore College, Doctor of Theology (Th.D.) program in Christian Theology commenced. Old Testament, Religions, Communication and were later added.

List of Principalships
- ?: The Rev. J. H. Richard Fröhlich; ELM, Dr. Theol. (Leipzig),
- ?: The Rev. Sigfrid Estborn; CoS, Ph.D. (Lund)
- ?: The Rev. P. David; AELC, Ph.D. (NYTS),
- ?: The Rev. M. Bage; GELC, Dr. Phil. (Berlin),
- ?–1992: The Rev. R. R. Sundara Rao; AELC, Ph. D. (Wisconsin),
- 1992–2001: The Rev. D. W. Jesudoss; TELC, Dr. Theol. (Erlangen),
- 2001–2006: The Rev. M. M. Chacko; CSI, Ph.D. (London),
- 2006–2011: The Rev. S. W. Meshack; IELC, Ph.D. (Leicester),
- 2011–2018: The Rev. K. D. Udayakumar; SALC, D.Th. (Serampore),
- 2018–2021: The Rev. D. J. S. Ponnusamy; CSI, Ph.D. (Lancaster),
- 2021–Pres.: The Rev. S.Songram Basumatary

== Administration ==
Ecumenicity is the special feature of the resurrected Gurukul. It is reflected in the composition of governing board, staff and students of the college. The Gurukul community now is composed of staff and students representing the United Evangelical Lutheran Churches (UELCI), Church of South India (CSI), Church of North India (CNI), Mar Thoma Syrian Church of Malabar (MTC), Indian Orthodox Church, Assembly of God, Mara Evangelical Church, Methodist Church in India (MCI), Baptists, Independent and Charismatic Churches. There are two representatives from the Church of South India and the Church of North India in the College Council.

== College song ==
The college song was written by N. Samuel of Tranquebar who was present during the dedication of the college, where he was to take some classes. He died before formal classes could begin.

== Notable alumni ==
- Awgin Kuriakose
- Johnson Thomaskutty

== See also ==
- Board of Theological Education of the Senate of Serampore College
- South Asia Theological Research Institute
- Andhra Christian Theological College, Hyderabad
- Education in India
- Literacy in India
- List of institutions of higher education in Tamil Nadu
