= Jeypore Evangelical Lutheran Church =

Christian denomination in India

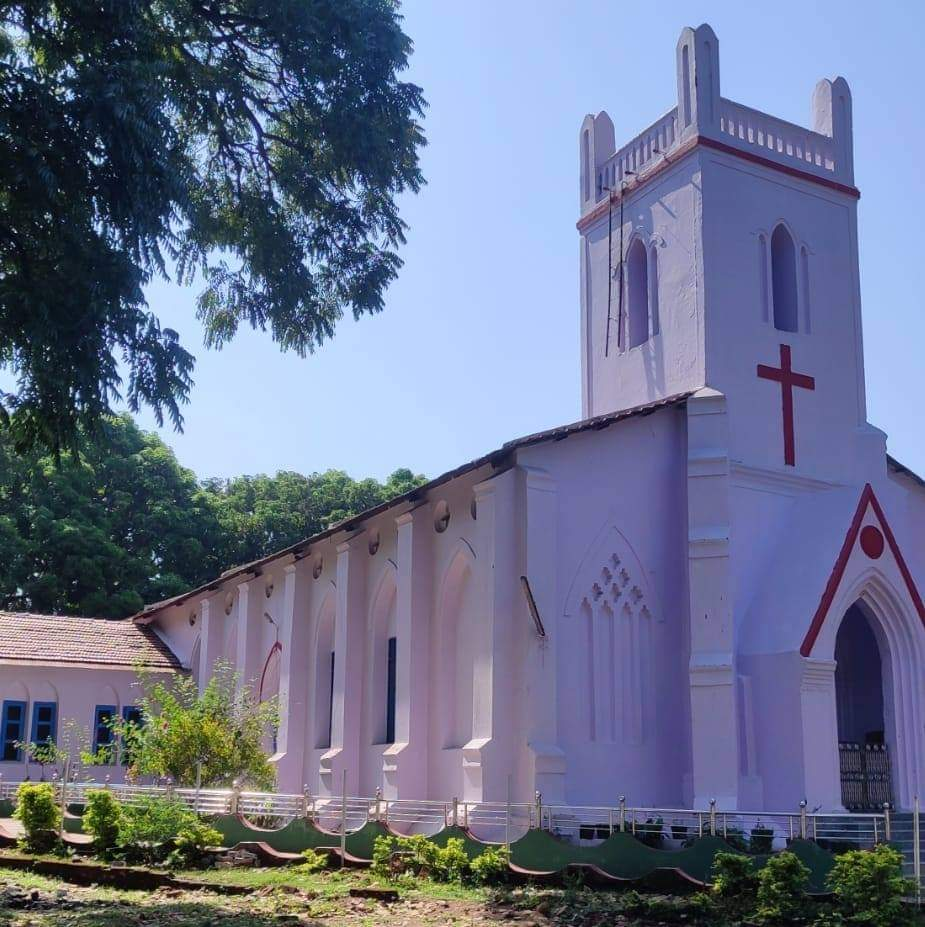
- Abbreviation: JELC
- Classification: Protestant
- Orientation: Lutheran
- Theology: Luther's theology
- Governance: JELC Central Office, Jeypore, Odisha
- Bishop: Rt.Rev.Anant Kumar Nag
- Region: Odisha
- Language: Odia
- Liturgy: Lutheran
- Headquarters: Jeypore 764 001
- Founder: The Schleswig Holstein Evangelical Lutheran Mission Society of Germany (SHELM) Vikram Dev III
- Origin: 1909; 117 years ago Odisha
- Recognition: World Council of Churches; Lutheran World Federation; National Council of Churches in India; United Evangelical Lutheran Church in India
- Congregations: Works predominantly in the Undivided Koraput Dist and Aruku Valley and Jagdalpur.
- Members: 250,000
- Ministers: More than 100
- Hospitals: Christian Hospital Nabrangpur (German Hospital), Christian Hospital Bissamcuttack
- Nursing homes: Nursing college (Christian Hospital Bissamcuttack)
- Primary schools: JELC Primary School Jeypore, Koraput, Nabrangpur, Malkagiri District
- Secondary schools: JELC High School Jeypore, Koraput, Kotpad, Nabrangpur
- Other names: (German) Jeypore Evangelisch-Lutherische Kirche; (Latin) Jeypore Ecclesiae Evangelicae Lutheranae; (Hindi) जयपुर इवेंजेलिकल लूथरन चर्च; (Odia) ଜୟପୁର ଇଭାନଜେଲିକାଲ୍ ଲୁଥେରାନ୍ ଚର୍ଚ୍ଚ
- Slogan: Thy Kingdom Come

Jeypore Evangelical Lutheran Church is a major Lutheran Christian denomination in India. It was established in 1882. At that time, the founder of The Schleswig Holstein Evangelical Lutheran Mission Society of Germany (SHELM) in Germany was Pastor Christian Jensen, who was praying for the people of India. Pioneer missionaries Rev. Ernest Pohl and Rev. Herman Bothmann came to India and reached the Koraput district of Odisha on 31 May 1882 and started mission work.

== Foundation ==
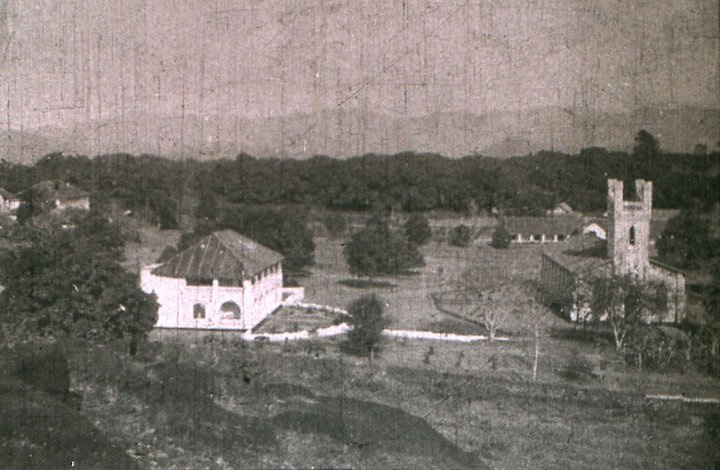
An old picture of JEL Church

In late 19th century, when the missionaries arrived, they faced several challenges; one of them was laying the foundation of a church. At first, they visited the king of Bastar state in Jagdalpur to seek approval for constructing a church and preaching Christianity in the region but were denied permission for the purpose. However, they later went to the neighbouring Jeypore state which was ruled by Maharaja Vikram Dev III and he granted them the permission and a plot where accordingly, the JEL Church was constructed in 1909.

The Germans were able to learn the local language, culture, customs, and the traditional system of the natives. The first woman, Asimuti Behera of the village Joba under the Kotpad mission station, was baptized by the missionary Timmke on 6 December 1886. A minority of local populace also volunteered for the mission programmes.

== Service ==
Apparently, it was from Jeypore Evangelical Lutheran Church that Christianity spread to other parts of southern Odisha such as Malkangiri, Nabarangpur, and Rayagada. Subsequently, the community members set up three major Christian hospitals in Bissam Cuttack, Nabarangpur, and Lamtaput in Koraput district to serve people from all religious backgrounds. The first Indian president, A. C. Kondpan, served two terms from 1954 to 1962. He was followed by the German missionaries, and then the second bishop of JELC., from 1972 to 1978. During this time, the JELC experienced a period of significant growth and progress. Kondpan was regarded as a visionary leader.

Now the church has more than 250,000 members. It has its own rules and regulations approved by IGR of Odisha, as per the society registration act of 1952, and the synod has four elected officers: bishop, synod chairman, secretary, and treasurer. They serve for a term of four years. The current office holders are bishop of JELC Bidhan Kumar Nayak, synod chairman Anant Nag, secretary Praful Bhatra, and treasurer Jasbir Paul. The headquarters of JELC function in Pohl & Bhothmann Bhavan, JELC central office, pin code -764001.

Jeypore Evangelical Lutheran Church is associated with the National Council of Churches in India, United Evangelical Lutheran Church in India, Lutheran World Federation, and World Council of Churches.

JELC has its unofficial Oriya-language Lutheran Hymns Book Android App, offered by Premasis Satman.

== See also ==
- Christianity in Odisha
- Christianity in India
- Martin Luther
