= India Evangelical Lutheran Church =

Lutheran Christian church body in India

- Classification: Christianity
- Orientation: Protestant
- Theology: Lutheran
- Structure: National church, middle level synods, and local congregations
- President: Rev. Dr. M. Mohanan
- Associations: United Evangelical Lutheran Church in India; International Lutheran Council; Lutheran World Federation
- Region: India
- Headquarters: Tamil Nadu, India
- Origin: 1895; Krishnagiri, Ambur Synod
- Independence: 1959
- Branched from: Lutheran Church – Missouri Synod
- Congregations: 764
- Members: 115,000 baptized 70,000 communicant
- Ministers: 220
- Hospitals: 3
- Primary schools: 59
- Secondary schools: 11
- Tertiary institutions: 2
- Official website: ielconline.com

The India Evangelical Lutheran Church (IELC) is a confessional Lutheran Christian church body of India headquartered in Tamil Nadu. It belongs to the International Lutheran Council and the Lutheran World Federation. It has three synods, named Ambur Synod, Nagercoil Synod, and Trivandrum Synod. The IELC was founded through the missionary efforts of the US-based Lutheran Church – Missouri Synod (LCMS), with whom it remains in altar and pulpit fellowship.

The inception of IELC is rooted in the mission work of LCMS that began in 1894. Over the following decades, the LCMS sent more than 60 missionaries to serve in India. The work in India was known as the Missouri Evangelical Lutheran Mission (MELIM) and was carried out in areas of the Tamil and Malayalam languages. In 1959, it was registered under the Societies Registration Act 1860 as the IELC and became an LCMS partner church. It now does work in an additional seven languages.

The IELC has approximately 764 congregations, 115,000 baptized members, 70,000 communicant members, and 220 active pastors. It also has 59 elementary schools, 11 high schools, 7 schools for disabled children, and 3 hospitals. About 800 teachers serve those schools, many of them graduates of the IELC's teachers training institute.

Concordia Theological Seminary in Nagercoil was founded in 1924 to train pastors. On 30 November 2017, Cyclone Ockhi damaged the seminary campus so severely that IELC leaders doubted that they would ever be able to reopen. Nevertheless, the seminary was able to rebuild. The new and renovated structures have retained the historic appearance of the campus. The rededication in June 2022 included representatives from the LCMS, which had helped with the reconstruction. The reopened seminary had almost 100 students, with plans to increase enrollment to 130 in two years.

The IELC is a member of the World Council of Churches, the Christian Conference of Asia, the National Council of Churches in India, and the Lutheran World Federation Council of Churches in India. It is a member church in the United Evangelical Lutheran Churches in India (UELCI), a communion of Lutheran churches.

The current president of the IELC is Rev. Dr. J. Priestly Balasingh, who was elected as president of the IELC in October 2022 in elections overseen by Retired Justice D. Hariparanthman.

== See also ==
- Christ Lutheran Church Kattukadai
- Adivasi
- Christianity in India
