= Board of Theological Education of the Senate of Serampore College =

University in Karnataka, India

- BTESSC
- Type: Regulatory body for Theological education in India
- Established: 1975
- Affiliations: Senate of Serampore College (University)
- President: Zacharias Mar Aprem
- Location: Bangalore, Karnataka, India
- Website: btessc.org

The Board of Theological Education of the Senate of Serampore College (BTESSC) is the arm of theological education under the Senate of Serampore College (University). BTESSC was formed in 1975.

The Senate of Serampore College (University), under which the BTESSC was constituted, is a university within the meaning of Section 2 (f) of the University Grants Commission Act, 1956 (as modified up to 20 December 1985).

In fact, Serampore was the first institution to be given the status of a university in India.

The BTESSC is one of the major representative bodies of churches legally constituted and responsible for administering theological education in South Asia.

Secretary of BTESSC, The Rev. T. Matthews Emmanuel, CBCNC died on 24 April 2021 in Bangalore. He began his theological studies in Andhra Christian Theological College, Hyderabad and upgraded his studies in Union Biblical Seminary, Pune. For postgraduate studies, he enrolled in Federated Faculty for Research in Religion and Culture, Kottayam and went on to complete doctoral studies in South Asia Theological Research Institute, then in Bangalore. He began his teaching career from Baptist Theological College, Pfütsero (Nagaland), Mennonite Brethren Centenary Bible College, Shamshabad (Telangana), and Andhra Christian Theological College, Secunderabad (Telangana). He was Secretary of BTESSC from 2018 to 2021.

== Membership ==
The BTESSC is a participating member in the World Conference of Associations of Theological Institutions

== History ==
Serampore was the only means of validating evangelical theological training in India until 1978. The Union Biblical Seminary, Poona was constituted in 1953 as an evangelical theological college at B.Th. and B.D. levels. It was accredited by the Board of Theological Education of the National Council of Churches in India in 1964 which was formed in 1955 to bring together the unaffiliated Bible schools and seminaries. UBS was affiliated to Serampore in 1973 at B.D. level. After a series of joint consultations with Serampore, the Board of Theological Education of NCCI decided in favour of the formation of one national structure for Theological Education in India. When Serampore accepted the proposal, a joint structure was formed in July 1975 as the Board of Theological Education of the Senate of Serampore College.

== Its functions ==
The functions of the Board as given in the Constitution of the BTESSC (revised and adopted on 3–4 February 1994 portray its mandatory role in the promotion of theological education in the country, viz.,

- Reflection and pioneering on new methods and style in theological education in relation to the need of the country and of the Churches
- Production of theological literature in general especially in regional languages
- Promotion of the welfare of theological teachers and students
- Development of ecumenical cooperation among theological institutions and their libraries
- Promotion of relationship between Churches, Theological institutions and study centres
- Any other issues related to theological education
- The Board shall recommend names of persons to be considered by the Senate for nomination to be appointed as Senators.

In matters of theological education, the BTESSC acts as an "advisory body" of the Senate of Serampore College (University) and the Senate is its voice.

== Administration ==
- Chairperson - The Rev. Zacharias Mar Aprem
- Secretary – Vacant
- Treasurer – The Rev. Akumarthi Samuel

== Notable persons associated with BTESSC ==
- C. L. Furtado, CSI,
- H. S. Wilson, CSI,
- Daniel D. Chetti, CBCNC,
- T. M. Emmanuel, CBCNC
