= Andhra Evangelical Lutheran Church =

Protestant church in India

- Abbreviation: AELC
- Type: Society
- Classification: Protestant
- Orientation: Lutheran
- Scripture: Holy Bible
- Theology: Postmodernism
- Polity: Episcopal
- Controller: Justice Kurian Joseph
- Administrator: P. S. Joseph
- Secretary to Controller: Nelaturi Jesu Ratna Kumar
- Associations: Synods
- Region: Andhra Pradesh; Karnataka; Tamil Nadu; Telangana; Andaman and Nicobar Islands
- Language: Telugu; English
- Headquarters: Guntur
- Founder: Evangelical Lutheran General Synod of the United States of America
- Origin: 1842; Guntur
- Congregations: 1,000+
- Members: 3,500,000+
- Ministers: B. V. Subbamma; R. R. Sundara Rao; P. Solomon Raj; G. D. Melanchthon
- Missionaries: John Christian Frederick Heyer; Anna Sarah Kugler; W. D. Coleman; W. P. Peery,

Andhra Evangelical Lutheran Church (AELC) was constituted in the year 1927 in Andhra Pradesh, India. It is the Indian successor to the United Lutheran Church in America which was started as a self-supporting, self-governing, and self-propagating church among Telugu Christians.

== Memberships ==
- Andhra Christian Theological College, Hyderabad
- Lutheran World Federation (LWF), Geneva
- It is an affiliate member of the National Council of Churches in India (NCCI), Nagpur
- It is a member church in the United Evangelical Lutheran Churches in India (UELCI) – a communion of Lutheran Churches, Chennai
- Asia Lutheran Communion

== In India ==
Bartholomaeus Ziegenbalg and Heinrich Plütschau of the Danish-Halle Missionary Society at Tranquebar were the first Protestant Missionaries to India who were Lutherans.

=== In Andhra Pradesh ===
The AELC was founded as a mission field of the then General Synod of the Lutheran Church in America by John Christian Frederick Heyer (known as Father Heyer) on 31 July 1842. AEL Church, Polepally

The first Andhra Evangelical Lutheran Church in Polepally, near Macherla Mandal, Guntur District, Andhra Pradesh, was first established by Father Hyer, serving as a cornerstone of Christian faith in the region. Over time, the original structure deteriorated and was demolished.

In 2015, Rev. Gera Ananda Pratap revitalized the church during his seven years of service. Under his leadership, the church was rebuilt, restoring its prominence as a center of worship and community life.

As a first step, schools were established. With new baptisms, the confidence of the missionaries increased. Later hospitals were established.

== Structures ==
- Theological
  - Andhra Lutheran Theological Seminary, Rajahmundry
  - Andhra Christian Theological College, Hyderabad
- Medical
  - Kugler Hospital, Guntur
  - Ruth Sigmon Memorial Lutheran Hospital, Guntur
  - Augustine Hospital, Bhimavaram
  - Baer Christian Hospital, Chirala, Prakasam District
- Educational
  - Andhra-Christian College, Guntur
  - Andhra-Lutheran College, Guntur
  - Stall School, Guntur
  - Lutheran High School, Bhimavaram
  - Shade Girls High School, Rajahmundry

== Administration ==
At present, w.e.f. 25 April 2025, vide judgement dated 3 April 2025 of High Court of Andhra Pradesh, W.A. No. 1033 of 2023 along with W. A. No. 746, 1052, 1053, and 1163 of 2023, the administration is taken up by,

- Controller, Justice Sri Kurian Joseph,
- Administrator, Sri P. S. Joseph,
- Secretary to Controller, Sri Nelaturi Jesu Ratna Kumar

For administrative purposes, six synods have been established, each taken care of by a Synod President. A 32-member Executive Council whose members are drawn from the six synods administers the Church society.

=== Moderator / Bishop ===
The Executive Council of this Church Society elects a set of office-bearers each quadrennium. The Moderator / Bishop heads this century-old Church Society. In earlier nomenclature, the term President was used. However, with the arrival of Rev. G. Emmanuel, the nomenclature was changed to Moderator / Bishop to denote a more ecclesiastical term. However, the term President also continues to be used.

== Succession of Presidents ==
Sl. No	Tenure	Name	Domicile	Earned academic credentials
I.	1927-1927	Sylvester Clark Burger	United States	B. A. (Gettysburg),
II.	1928-1932	Roy Martin Dunkelberger	United States	B.A. (Dickinson), M.A. (Dickinson), B. D. (Gettysburg), S. T. M. (Gettysburg)
III.	1932-1934	James Russell Fink	United States	B.A. (Gettysburg), S.T.M. (Gettysburg)
IV.	1935-1936	Ernst William Neudoeffer	United States	B.D. (LTSP)
V.	1936-1937	John Roy Strock	United States	B.A. (Dickinson), M.A. (Dickinson), B.D. (Gettysburg)
VI.	1938-1940	Luther Walter Slifer	United States	B.A. (Gettysburg), M.A. (Columbia), B.D. (UTS)
VII.	1940-1944	James Russell Fink	United States	B.A. (Gettysburg), S.T.M. (Gettysburg)
VIII.	1944–1950	Prakasam, Ethakoti	India	L. Th. (Serampore)
IX.	1951–1955	A. N. Gopal	India	L. Th. (Serampore), Th. M. (LSTC)
X.	1956–1960	Devasahayam, Garikapudi	India	L. Th. (Serampore), S.T.M. (LTSP)
XI.	1961–1962	K. Krupadanam	India	L. Th. (Serampore)
XII.	1963–1964	Devasahayam, Garikapudi	India	L. Th. (Serampore), S.T.M. (LTSP)
XIII.	1965–1969	Devasahayam, Kirlampudy	India	B.A. (Andhra), B.D. (Serampore), Th. M. (LTSP)
XIV.	1969–1981	Samuel William Schmitthenner	India	B.A. (Gettysburg), B.D. (Gettysburg)
XV.	1981–1989	Nathaniel, Kaki	India	L. Th. (Serampore)
XVI.	1993–1997	Victor Paul, Mortha	India	B. A. (Andhra), BEd (Andhra), B. D. (Serampore), M. Th. (Serampore), S. T. M. (LS), D. Min. (LS)
XVII.	1997–2000	Emmanuel, Gangavarapu	India	L. Th. (Serampore)
XVIII.	2000–2001	N. Ch. Joseph	India	
XIX.	2001–2005	Victor Moses, Chukka	India	B. Th. (Serampore), B. D. (Serampore), M. Th. (Serampore)
XX.	2005–2009	Christopher, Vardanapu	India	B. Th. (Serampore), B. D. (Serampore)
XXI.	2009–2013	Suneel Bhanu, Busi	India	B. D. (Serampore), Th. M. (SEAGST)
XXII.	2013-2021	Frederick Paradesi Babu, Kollabathula	India	B. Th. (Serampore), B. D. (Serampore)
XXIII.	2021-2025	Ch. Elia	India	B. D (Serempore), Bib.Lang (Serempore), M.Th. (Serempore), M.Phil (A.N.University)

== Women's ordination ==
For long, women's ordination in the AELC was taboo. One of the first theologically trained women of this Church, the Fuller Theological Seminary-educated Rev. Dr B. V. Subbamma could have been ordained long ago. But Church leaders, fearing her leadership kept the issue of women's ordination aside.

However, with sustained efforts and dialogue of Dr. K. Rajaratnam, Rev. Dr. Prasanna Kumari Samuel, and Dr. Monica J. Melanchton of the Gurukul Lutheran Theological College and Research Institute (GLTCRI), the dream of women's ordination became a reality. With the active cooperation of the then President, Bishop G. Emmanuel, seventeen women were ordained into pastoral ministry on 20 February 1999.

Synod Presidents of the AELC
- Visakha Synod

Rev.P Sudarsan Kumar

- East Godavari Synod

Rev. A Samuel Raju

- West Godavari Synod

Rev. B.Anand kumar

- East Guntur Synod

Rev. K. Ratna Mohan

- Central Guntur Synod

Rev. S.J Babu Rao

- West Guntur Synod

Rev. J.Prabhakar
