= Advanced Institute for Research on Religion and Culture =

Advanced Institute for Research on Religion and Culture (ARRC)
- Type: Federated Faculty
- Established: 2016
- Affiliations: Senate of Serampore College (University), Serampore 712 201, Hooghly district, West Bengal
- Visitor: Bishop Anilkumar John Servand, MCI
- Registrar: The Rev. Y. D. Jayaker, CMBCI, D.Th. (Serampore)
- Location: Beside National Police Academy, Shivrampally, Hyderabad 500 052, Telangana, India

Advanced Institute for Research on Religion and Culture (ARRC) is a federated faculty established in 2016, which comprises four institutions, namely,

- Andhra Christian Theological College,
- Calvin Institute of Theology,
- Henry Martyn Institute and,
- Mennonite Brethren Centenary Bible College

- all based in the twin cities of Hyderabad and Secunderabad offering post graduate level Master of Theology courses with specializations in Sacred scripture and Religion.

The ARRC is affiliated to the nation's first University, the Senate of Serampore College (University) {a University under Section 2 (f) of the University Grants Commission Act, 1956}with degree-granting authority validated by a Danish charter and ratified by the Government of West Bengal.

Registrars
- 2016–2017 The Rev. T. Swami Raju, AELC, D.Th. (Serampore)
- 2017–2019 The Rev. M. M. Abraham, MMTSC, Ph.D. (Jamia)
- 2019–2022 The Rev. T. Swami Raju, AELC, D. Th. (Serampore)
- 2022–2025 The Rev. T. Packiam Samuel, CSI, Ph.D. (Oxford Brookes)
- 2025–Present The Rev. Y. D. Jayaker, CMBCI, D. Th. (Serampore)

== History ==
=== Theological colleges ===
The first theological colleges established in Hyderabad and Secunderabad is the Mennonite Brethren Centenary Bible College founded in 1920 in Shamshabad locality. The rest of the seminaries were founded elsewhere and relocated later to the twin cities. St. John's Regional Seminary was founded in 1926 and relocated in 1965. Though the Andhra Christian Theological College was founded in 1964 in Rajahmundry, it moved to Secunderabad only in 1973. The Calvin Institute of Theology is a recent addition which was established in 2009 and relocated later. As for the Henry Martyn Institute, it was only an institution offering post graduate diploma courses under its seal, which also relocated to Hyderabad in 1972.

=== Scholars ===
Among these theological colleges, St. John’s Regional Seminary and Andhra Christian Theological College had faculty with the highest academic qualifications in Europe, North America, Africa and the Indian subcontinent in Universities of Edinburgh, Cambridge, Hamburg, Cape Town, Chicago, Serampore, Papal Seminary, Wisconsin, Lancaster, McCormick, Syracuse, Eastern, Hartford, Duke, Union, PIB Rome, Gregorian, Urban and other distinguished schools of theological education.

=== Efforts to initiate postgraduate level courses ===
However, though the faculty were qualified enough, the institutions where they taught were eligible to only offer graduate level courses. Efforts were made by successive faculty of the Andhra Christian Theological College beginning during the tenure of the New Testament Scholar, The Rev. S. Joseph coinciding with the Silver Jubilee Celebrations of the College in 1989 to start postgraduate level courses. After nearly a decade and half, efforts were renewed by the Old Testament Scholar Trio, beginning with The Rev. N. V. Luther Paul, D. Th. (Serampore) (2006-2010) followed by The Rev. Ch. Vasantha Rao, Dr. Theol. (Hamburg) (2010-2014) and The Rev. T. Matthews Emmanuel, D. Th. (Serampore) (2014-2017).

=== Creation of special purpose entity ===
Meanwhile, with the addition of Calvin Institute of Theology that was established in 2009, efforts fructified, but this time in confederation with other institutions, the postgraduate courses were finally initiated with the creation of the Special-purpose entity consisting of Andhra Christian Theological College, the Henry Martyn Institute, and the Calvin Institute of Theology during the tenures of The Rev. T. Matthews Emmanuel, D. Th. (Serampore), The Rev. Packiam T. Samuel, Ph. D., (Oxford Brookes) and The Rev. Gopalswamy Jacob, Ph. D., (Apeldoorn) respectively, together forming the Advanced Institute for Research on Religion and Culture (ARRC) in 2016 for which the Senate of Serampore College (University) granted affiliation beginning with the academic year 2016.

== Academics ==
As per the affiliation norms of the Senate of Serampore College (University), the federated faculty is authorized to offer courses in Master of Theology in three disciplines, namely, the Old Testament, the New Testament and Religions (Hinduism and Islam).

Course offerings at the Advanced Institute for Research on Religion and Culture
Course Name	Specialization	Duration	Mode	Academic requirement	Academic Authority
Master of Theology	Old Testament	2 years	Residential	57.4 to 52.5% marks in Bachelor of Divinity	Serampore
Master of Theology	New Testament	2 years	Residential	57.4 to 52.5% marks in Bachelor of Divinity	Serampore
Master of Theology	Religions	2 years	Residential	57.4 to 52.5% marks in Bachelor of Divinity	Serampore
Master of Theology	Christian Ministry	2 years	Residential	57.4 to 52.5% marks in Bachelor of Divinity	Serampore
Master of Theology	History of Christianity	2 years	Residential	57.4 to 52.5% marks in Bachelor of Divinity	Serampore

== Faculty ==
The faculty in the three specializations offered by the ARRC include,

ARRC Faculty hailing from Andhra Christian Theological College, Calvin Institute of Theology, Henry Martyn Institute and Mennonite Brethren Centenary Bible College.
Discipline	Faculty Name	Gen der	Host Institution	Highest Degree	Alma mater	University
Old Testament	Gopalswamy Jacob	M	CIT	Ph. D.	Theological University, Apeldoorn	Apeldoorn
Old Testament	G. Vara Prasad	M	ACTC	D. Th.	United Theological College, Bangalore	Serampore
New Testament	K. Suraj Kumar	M	MBCBC	Ph. D.	University of Cape Town, South Africa	Cape Town
New Testament	A. J. Yesu	M	CIT	D. Th.		Serampore
New Testament	V. Manikya Rao	M	ACTC	D. Th.	SATHRI, Bangalore	Serampore
Religions	T. Swamy Raju	M	ACTC	D. Th.	SATHRI, Bangalore	Serampore
Religions	M. M. Abraham	M	HMI	Ph. D.	Jamia Milia Islamia	Jamia Milia Islamia
Religions	Packiam T. Samuel	M	HMI	Ph. D.	Westminster College, Oxford	Oxford Brookes
Religions	S. S. Waheedullah Hussaini Multani	M	HMI	Ph. D.	Osmania University, Hyderabad	Osmania
Christian Ministry	A. John Prabhakar	M	ACTC	D. Th.	SATHRI, Bangalore	Serampore
History of Christianity	I. P. Asheervadam	M	MBCBC	D. Th.	SATHRI, Bangalore	Serampore
History of Christianity	N. V. Grace Bhanu	F	ACTC	Ph. D.	ANU, Namburu	Nagarjuna
History of Christianity	Y. D. Jayaker	M	MBCBC	D. Th.	SATHRI, Serampore	Serampore
