= Mennonite Brethren Centenary Bible College =

Mennonite Brethren Centenary Bible College (MBCBC)
- యెమె. బి. బైబిల్ కళాశాల
- Former names: Bethany Bible School, Mennonite Brethren Bible Institute
- Motto: APTUM EFFICIANT AD TESTIMONIUM DANT UTILE LIGNUM
- Motto in English: Equip to Serve for Effective Witness
- Type: Seminary
- Established: 1920
- Affiliations: Conference of the Mennonite Brethren Churches in India; Senate of Serampore College (University), Serampore 712 201, Hooghly district, West Bengal
- Visitor: Bishop Anilkumar John Servand, MCI
- Principal: The Rev. I. P. Asheervadam, D. Th.(Serampore)
- Faculty: 10+
- Students: 500+
- Undergraduates: 100+
- Location: Rallaguda Road, Shamshabad 501 218, Rajendranagar Mandal, Rangareddy District, Telangana, India; 17.2726946°N 78.3850377°E
- Website: www.mbcbiblecollege.com
- Location within Telangana Location within India

Mennonite Brethren Centenary Bible College (MBCBC), founded in 1920, is a Mennonite Bible College in Shamshabad and is affiliated with the Conference of the Mennonite Brethren Churches in India and the nation's first University, the Senate of Serampore College (University) with degree-granting authority validated by a Danish charter and ratified by the Government of West Bengal.

== History ==
The year 1920 is attributed to the founding of the college in Nagarkurnool under the name Bethany Bible School which later on was moved to its present location in Shamshabad. Over a period of time, the School was rechristened as Mennonite Brethren Bible Institute. The Rev. S. Solomon in A Brief History of Mennonite Brethren Bible Institute recorded the movements of the college to various towns chronologically,

1. 1920 in Nagarkurnool,
2. 1921-1923 in Shamshabad,
3. 1923-1929 in Nagarkurnool,
4. 1930-1944 in Shamshabad,
5. 1945-1952 in Devarakonda,
6. 1952 to present in Shamshabad

Even though the Church Society founded a seminary in 1920, it continued to send its ministerial candidates to STBC-Ramayapatnam Baptist Theological Seminary in Ramayapatnam until 1970, when it chose Union Biblical Seminary, Pune and later, CSI-United Theological College, Bangalore. Finally, after gaining University affiliation in the 1990s, it began training its candidates within its Seminary for graduate education.

In 1969 when the Board of Governors of the Andhra Christian Theological College set up an internal curriculum revision committee to introspect their courses, the members of the Kretzmann Commission also visited the MBCBC for a field visit as part of their itinerary led by eminent ecclesiastical personalities who include, The Rev. M. L. Kretzmann, IELC, The Rev. K. Devasahayam, AELC, The Rev. A. B. Masilamani, CBCNC and The Rev. C. S. Sundaresan, CSI.

=== University affiliation ===
Efforts were made by the Conference of the Mennonite Brethren Churches in India to affiliate the MBCBC with the Senate of Serampore College (University) ever since the college began offering B.Th. courses from 1989 onwards during the Principalship of The Rev. R. S. Lemuel, CMBCI. It was in 1994 that the Senate Commission visited the college during the tenure of the University Registrar, the New Testament Scholar, The Rev. D. S. Satyaranjan who deputed the Church Historian, Bishop Emeritus J. W. Gladstone, CSI, the Systematic Theologian, The Rev. O. V. Jathanna, CSI and others followed by another Commission led by the Old Testament Scholar, The Rev. Gnana Robinson, CSI and the Systematic Theologian, The Rev. P. Kambar Manickam, TELC, who conducted an academic feasibility following the thorough affiliating regimen of the university and reported to the Senate of Serampore College (University). Subsequently, the college availed the teaching of faculty from the nearest theologiate, the Andhra Christian Theological College for core subjects that included the Old Testament Scholar, The Rev. G. Babu Rao, CBCNC who took up teaching on an adjunct basis and from thereon with the full-time faculty on its rolls, the college built up itself up to the B.D. level. The presence of The Rev. A. Wilson, CBCNC on the faculty during the years 1990-1993 and his administrative role as Registrar and Academic Dean was helpful in terms of meeting Senate's academic requirements on road to affiliation. Finally in 1995, the college was provisionally affiliated to the Senate of Serampore College (University) and continues to be an important affiliated institution.

== Academics ==
=== Course offerings ===
The MBCBC offers the following three courses, two of which are affiliated to the Senate of Serampore College (University). For those taking up full-time vocation of Priesthood, the college offers full-time 5-year fully residential B. D. course with University affiliation for Christians of Protestant, Orthodox, Charismatic and the Small and Indigenous Churches. A Diploma level course introducing Christianity is open for people of all faiths, also offered through the university. In addition, the college has initiated a post-graduate diploma in peace studies under the seal of the college.

Course offerings at the MBCBC
Course Name	Duration	Mode	Academic requirement	Community requirement	Academic Authority
Bachelor of Divinity	5 years	Residential	Intermediate	Christians	Serampore
Diploma in Christian Studies	1 year	Distance	Intermediate	Open to all faiths	Serampore
P. G. Diploma in Peacemaking and Conflict Resolution Studies	1 year	Distance	Intermediate	Christians	MBCBC

=== Faculty ===
The faculty of the MBCBC have a minimum of master's level qualification with teaching experience across affiliated colleges of the Senate of Serampore College (University) from various Protestant Church congregations.

Mennonite Brethren Centenary Bible College Faculty (as per updated faculty list of the MBCBC uploaded by the Senate)
Discipline	Faculty Name	Gen der	Domicile	Highest Degree	Alma mater	University
Old Testament	The Rev. K. David	M	Telangana	M.Th.	GLTCRI, Chennai	Serampore
Religions	The Rev. Kondra Srinivas	M	Telangana	M.Th.	ARRC, Shamshabad	Serampore
Old Testament	Mr. I. Sukanth Simon	M	Telangana	M. Th.	UTC, Bangalore	Serampore
Church History	Ms. Samarpita Petra	F	West Bengal	M.Th.	GLTCRI, Chennai	Serampore
Church History	The Rev. B. Raja Shekar	M	Andhra Pradesh	M.Th.	ARRC, Shamshabad	Serampore
Counselling	The Rev. M.J. Shanthi Datha	M	Telangana	M.Th.	UTC, Bangalore	Serampore
Communication	The Rev. R. Ezra	M	Andhra Pradesh	M.Th.	TTS, Madurai	Serampore
Old Testament	The Rev. K. Vijaya Kumar	M	Andhra Pradesh	Ph.D.	SHUATS, Allahabad	SHUATS
English language	Ms. Christina Lurdhamani^{Laity}	F	Telangana	M. A.	FPU, Fresno	Fresno Pacific
Systematic Theology	The Rev. Jeyaraj Rajaiah	M	Tamil Nadu	Ph.D.	Utrecht University, Utrecht	Utrecht
New Testament	Ms. Sindhu Joseph	F	Kerala	D.Th.	UTC, Bangalore	Serampore
History of Christianity	The Rev. Y. D. Jayaker, CMBCI	M	Telangana	D. Th.	FFRRC, Kottayam	Serampore
New Testament	The Rev. K. Suraj Kumar, CBM	M	Andhra Pradesh	Ph.D.	University of Cape Town, Cape Town	Cape Town
History of Christianity	The Rev. I. P. Asheervadam, CMBCI	M	Telangana	D. Th.	UTC, Bangalore	Serampore

=== Library ===
The Library at the MBCBC is well stocked and has three sections and well maintained. In fact, prior to becoming the Principal, The Rev. I. P. Asheervadam used to oversee the library.

- Main Library,
- Historical Library and Archives, and
- Centre for Peace and Conflict Resolution Studies (CPCRS) Peace Library

Peter Penner writes that the missionary Ms. Emma Lepp who used to teach at the college was entrusted in 1962 with the task of consolidating the library acquisitions. During the later years, there have been overseas Librarians who have guided and helped in the maintenance of the library, which includes, Ms. Shirley Anne of Kansas.

The library is one of the oldest and continues to preserve archival holdings and was referred to by the Board of Theological Education of the Senate of Serampore College when it initiated the series Bibliography of Original Christian Writings in India in the 1990s during the incumbency of the Christian Theologian, The Rev. H. S. Wilson, CSI, the Christian Ethics Scholar, The Rev. Hunter P. Mabry, UMC and the New Testament Scholar, The Rev. Zaihmingthanga, PCI for which the Christian Theologian, The Rev. Ravela Joseph, STBC, and the Religious Scholar, The Rev. B. Suneel Bhanu, AELC were entrusted with the compilation in Telugu language. The library continues to be oft referred to by Scholars with the recent being the Systematic Theologian, James Elisha Taneti who also made use of the resources here in compiling History of the Telugu Christians: A Bibliography in 2011 for the American Theological Library Association.

=== Student life and annual days ===
Enrolments at the college have been on an all-time high with the college getting affiliation status with the Senate of Serampore College (University) with candidates for Priesthood hailing from the Indian subcontinent as well as overseas candidates from the African continent. At the end of every academic year, the college awards Diplomas to its students pending final University Degree which is awarded by the Senate of Serampore College (University). For every College graduation, notable Theologians and Ministers with substantial pastoral experience have been delivering the graduation address. In recent times, in 2016, it was the Homiletics Scholar, The Right Reverend K. Reuben Mark, Bishop - in - Karimnagar who delivered the graduation address. For the College Annual Graduation of 2017, the new Bishop, The Right Reverend A. C. Solomon Raj, Bishop - in - Medak was invited to deliver the Graduation Address on 8 April 2017.

== Succession of principals since 1920 ==
Since the founding of the Bible College in 1920, there have been many who led the college beginning with The Rev. Daniel F. Bergthold and down the line, The Rev. N. P. James became the first postcolonial Principal of the college. One of the Principals, The Rev. Paul G. Hiebert was Fulbright Visiting Professor at the Osmania University during 1974–1975.

No.	Period (Years)	Principal (Names)	Academic Credentials (Earned)
1.	1920-1921	The Rev. Daniel F. Bergthold	B. A. (McPherson), M. Div. (Moody)
2.	1921-1923	The Rev. Johann H. Pankratz	Th. B. (Rochester)
3.	1923-1928	The Rev. Daniel F. Bergthold	B. A. (McPherson), M. Div. (Moody)
4.	1929-1945	The Rev. John H. Lohrenz	B. A. (Tabor), M. A. (Bluffton)
5.	1945-1952	The Rev. Peter V. Balzer	B. A. (Tabor), Th. B. (Central), M. A. (Phillips)
6.	1958-1966	The Rev. Paul G. Hiebert	B. A. (Tabor), M. A. (Fresno Pacific), M. A. (Minnesota), Ph. D. (Minnesota)
7.	1966-1968	The Rev. Peter M. Hamm	B. A. (British Columbia), M. A. (Fresno Pacific)
8.	1970	The Rev. N. P. James	B. D. (Serampore), M. A. (Fresno Pacific)
9.	1971-1973	The Rev. R. S. Lemuel	B. A. (Osmania), M. A. (Fresno Pacific)
10.	1973	The Rev. D. J. Arthur	B. Com. (Osmania), B. A. (Osmania), B. Ed. (Osmania), B. D. (Serampore), M. A. (Fresno Pacific), Th. D. (Dallas)
11.	1974-1980	The Rev. N. P. James	B. D. (Serampore), M. A. (Fresno Pacific)
12.	1980-1989	The Rev. V. K. Rufus	B. A. (Tabor), M. A. (Tabor), M. Div. (Fuller), Th. M. (Trinity)
13.	1989-1993	The Rev. R. S. Lemuel	B. A. (Osmania), M. A. (Fresno Pacific)
14.	1993-2003	The Rev. V. K. Rufus	B. A. (Tabor), M. A. (Tabor), M. Div. (Fuller), Th. M. (Trinity)
15.	2003-2004	The Rev. S. Solomon	B. Th. (Serampore), B. D. (Serampore), M. A. (Osmania), M. Phil. (Madurai),
16.	2004-2008	The Rev. Joy Joseph	
17.	2008-2011	The Rev. Liangao Soto	B. Th. (Serampore), B. D. (Serampore), M. Th. (Serampore), D. Th. (Serampore)
18.	2011-Present	The Rev. I. P. Asheervadam	B. A. (Osmania), M. A. (Osmania), B. Th. (Serampore), B. D. (Serampore), M. Th. (Serampore), D. Th. (Serampore)

== See also ==
- Education in India
- Literacy in India
- List of institutions of higher education in Telangana
