= Jukal =

Jukal may refer to:

- Jukal, India
- Jukal, Iran
