= Madanapala =

Madanapala may refer to:

- Madanapala (Gahadavala dynasty) (r. c. 1104–1113 CE), Indian king
- Madanapala (Pala dynasty) (r. c. 1144–1162 CE), Indian king

== See also ==
- Madanapalle, city in Andhra Pradesh, India
  - Madanapalle (Assembly constituency)
- Madanpally, village in Andhra Pradesh, India
