= Bess Allen Donaldson =

American Presbyterian missionary

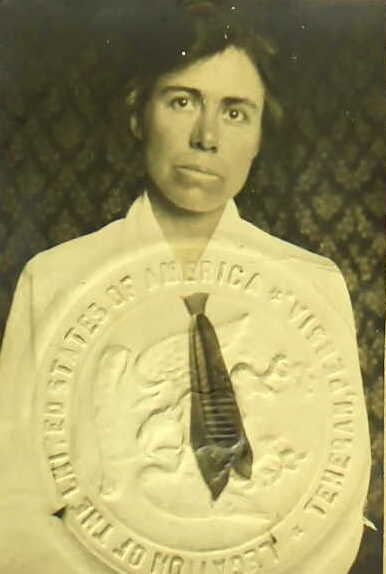
- Born: December 7, 1879; Galesburg
- Died: December 20, 1974 (aged 95); Lakeland
- Occupation: Missionary
- Spouse(s): Dwight Martin Donaldson

Bess Allen Donaldson (December 7, 1879 – December 20, 1974) was an American Presbyterian missionary in Persia and India.

Bess Allen Donaldson was born on December 7, 1879 in Galesburg, Illinois. She graduated from Knox College and worked as a teacher in Illinois. In 1910, she went to Tehran as a missionary with the Presbyterian Board of Foreign Missions, where she worked as a teacher and later principal of the Iran Bethel Girls' School. In Tehran in 1916, she married Dwight Martin Donaldson, a missionary who began working in Mašhad in 1915. They worked in the country until 1940, when missionaries were expelled and schools nationalized in Iran. The couple then lived in India, where her husband was principal of the Henry Martyn Institute of Islamic Studies at Aligarh. They retired in 1951.

Both Donaldson's wrote extensively about the Middle East. Bess Donaldson published The Wild Rue: A Study of Muhammadan Magic and Folklore in Iran (1938), a study of everything from childbirth practices to burial practices. She also wrote a pair of memoirs, Prairie Girl: Memoirs of the Midwest (1971) and Prairie Girl in Iran and India (1972).

Bess Allen Donaldson died on 20 December 1974 in Lakeland, Florida.

== Bibliography ==
- The Wild Rue: A Study of Muhammadan Magic and Folklore in Iran (London, 1938)
- Prairie Girl: Memoirs of the Midwest (Galesburg, Ill., 1971)
- Prairie Girl in Iran and India (Galesburg, Ill., 1972)
