= Rallagudem =

- Village
- Country: India
- State: Andhra Pradesh

Languages
  - Official: Telugu
- Time zone: UTC+5:30 (IST)
- Telephone code: 040
- Vehicle registration: AP-26 X XXXX
- Sex ratio: 1:1(approx) ♂/♀

Rallagudem is a village in Rangareddy district in Andhra Pradesh, India. It is close to Shamshabad.
