= Paul Hiebert =

Paul Hiebert may refer to:

- Paul Hiebert (writer) (1892–1987), Canadian writer and humorist
- Paul Hiebert (missiologist) (1932–2007), American missiologist
