= Mount Hermon School =

Mount Hermon School may refer to:

- Mount Hermon School, Darjeeling, India
- Northfield Mount Hermon School, Massachusetts, US
