= Kambar Manickam =

Indian Lutheran priest

The Reverend P. Kambar Manickam, TELC
- Born: 26 August 1935; Tamil Nadu
- Died: 19 July 2020 (aged 84)
- Citizenship: India
- Education: B. Com. (Madras), B. D. (Serampore), Th. M. (Luther Seminary)
- Alma mater: Madras University, Madras, Luther Seminary, Saint Paul, Minnesota
- Occupation: Priesthood
- Years active: 1973-1998
- Religion: Christianity
- Church: Tamil Evangelical Lutheran Church
- Congregations served: Coimbatore District
- Title: The Reverend

P. Kambar Manickam is a Priest of the Tamil Evangelical Lutheran Church and current Asia Pacific representative of the International Council on Pastoral Care and Counselling.

== Contribution ==
=== Christian Yoga ===
In the 1970s, Manickam researched on Yoga as a means for finding Christ, thereby espousing the cause for a Christian Yoga and its contribution to Indian Christian spirituality. During the successive decades, Research scholars have also espoused the cause of Yoga as a means to find oneness with Jesus Christ. Justin O'Brien (1996), finds that oneness with God could be attained only through Jesus Christ for which he quotes Swami Rama, who found that Yoga was the only means in attaining it. Susan Bordenkirche (2006) has called for a Christ-centric Yoga while Cyprian Consiglio, OSB Cam. (2015) had strived for a revisitation of Indian spirituality as strived by Bede Griffiths, OSB Cam., Henri Le Saux, OSB and others with special reference to Yoga.

=== Third world dependency and the case for Indian ethos ===
Muthyala Theophilus, CBCNC (1895-1946) then Senator of the Senate of Serampore College (University) was the pivot for the formation of the Convention of Baptist Churches of Northern Circars as a direct Indian successor of the Canadian Baptist Ministries in Andhra Pradesh and towed the line of Indian ethos in Missiological leadership in India and had been more practical that saw periodical reduction in overseas contribution to the missions in India. Similarly, the Bible Society of India, since the 1960s was also instrumental from the time of the rural Pastor, A. E. Inbanathan, CSI in being able to tide over overseas support and build up contributions from within the country by means of an effective fund raising system.

James A. Berquist who once taught at the Gurukul Lutheran Theological College, Madras, together with Kambar Manickam brought out a study in 1976 entitled The crisis of dependency in third world ministries: a critique of inherited missionary forms in India, that sought to see the volume of dependency on partner countries and build up the case for indigenous support for the Christian mission in India. P. Solomon Raj, AELC (2003), Roger E. Hedlund, SBM (1999) had also conducted studies on the new and indigenous Churches in India that were centred around Gospel but independent of any western influence which even the Old Testament Scholar Victor Premasagar, CSI (2003) heaped praises on such indigenous missions as not only espousing the Gospel but also the Indian ethos.

== Writings ==
- 1972, Toward an Indian Christian spirituality : A case for Christian yoga,
- 1976 (with James A. Bergquist), The crisis of dependency in third world ministries: a critique of inherited missionary forms in India,
- 1977, Yoga, Zen and Psychotherapy: Their relevance for Pastoral Counselling,
- 1979, Mental Health and Meditation,
- 1990 (with Christoffer Grundmann and Daniel Manohar), Selected writings of Martin Luther (Tamil) - Volume 1,
- 1994 (with Christoffer Grundmann), Selected writings of Martin Luther (Tamil) - Volume 2,

== Studies ==
After general studies leading to graduation at the University of Madras, Madras, Kambar Manickam entered the ministry of the Church as a ministerial candidate of the Tamil Evangelical Lutheran Church (TELC), the direct successor of the first Protestant mission founded by Bartholomäus Ziegenbalg and underwent Spiritual formation at one of the affiliated seminaries of the Senate of Serampore College (University), founded by the Baptist missions led by Joshua Marshman, William Carey and William Ward, and was ordained by the Tamil Evangelical Lutheran Church (TELC) and served as a Priest.

During 1971-1973, Manickam underwent advanced spiritual studies at the Luther Seminary, Saint Paul, Minnesota specializing in Pastoral counseling studying along with M. Victor Paul, AELC.

== Ministry ==
=== Pastoral ===
Manickam pastored parishes within the ecclesiastical jurisdiction of the Tamil Evangelical Lutheran Church Society for nearly eight years'.

=== Teaching ===
Manickam was a Pastoral counseling Teacher at the Tamil Nadu Theological Seminary, Madurai and became Principal in 1987 succeeding the Old Testament Scholar, Gnana Robinson, CSI and stepped down in 1998 on attaining superannuation paving way for the New Testament Scholar, Dhyanchand Carr, CSI who succeeded him as Principal.

In 1995, Manickam participated in the United Nations Commission on Human Rights held in Geneva as a representative of the Tamil Nadu Theological Seminary.

=== University administration ===
By virtue of being the Principal at the Tamil Nadu Theological Seminary, Manickam became an Ex officio member of the Senate of Serampore College (University), the nation's first University, the Senate of Serampore College (University) {a University under Section 2 (f) of the University Grants Commission Act, 1956}with degree-granting authority validated by a Danish Charter and ratified by the Government of West Bengal coinciding with the Registrarship of D. S. Satyaranjan, IPC, and as a Senate Commission member, he along with Gnana Robinson, CSI, had visited the Mennonite Brethren Centenary Bible College, Shamshabad in Telangana in the 1990s for looking into the case for feasibility of affiliation of the College to the University and also revisiting the Protestant Regional Theologiate in Secunderabad for conducting periodical affiliation regimen at the Andhra Christian Theological College during the Principalship of R. Yesurathnam, CSI coinciding with the presence of the founding member of the Association of Theologically Trained Women in India, Johanna Rose Ratnavathi, AELC.

Academic offices
Preceded by Gnana Robinson, CSI	Principal, Tamil Nadu Theological Seminary, Madurai; 1987-1998	Succeeded by Dhyanchand Carr, CSI
