= Paul Hiebert (missiologist) =

American missiologist (1932-2007)

- Born: November 13, 1932; Shamshabad, Hyderabad State, British India (now in Telangana, India)
- Died: March 11, 2007 (aged 74); Baltimore, Maryland, US
- Education: B. A. (Tabor); M. A. (Fresno Pacific); M.A. (Minnesota); Ph. D. (Minnesota)
- Alma mater: Kodaikanal International School, Kodaikanal, Tamil Nadu; Tabor College, Kansas (United States); Mennonite Brethren Biblical Seminary, Fresno, California (United States); University of Minnesota, Minnesota (United States)
- Occupation: Pastor-University Teacher-Researcher-Missiologist
- Years active: 1958-2007 (49 years)
- Known for: Anthropological insights in missions

Ecclesiastical career
- Church: Conference of the Mennonite Brethren Churches in India

Paul Gordon Hiebert (13 November 1932 – 11 March 2007) was an American missiologist. He was "arguably the world's leading missiological anthropologist."

== Biography ==
Hiebert was born in India to missionary parents, and studied at Tabor College, Mennonite Brethren Biblical Seminary, and the University of Minnesota.

Subsequently, Hiebert went as a missionary to India and was Principal of the Mennonite Brethren Centenary Bible College, Shamshabad. After a period of missionary service, he proceeded to Pasadena, California where he taught at Fuller Theological Seminary before becoming Distinguished Professor of Mission and Anthropology at Trinity Evangelical Divinity School. Paul became the Chair of the Department of Missions and Evangelism at Trinity in addition to maintaining his Professor duties. From 1974 to 1975, Hiebert lectured at Osmania University, Hyderabad, India on a Fulbright Scholarship.

A Festschrift in his honor, Globalizing Theology: Belief and Practice in an Era of World Christianity was published in 2006.

Hiebert died of cancer in 2007.

== Missiology ==
Hiebert developed several theories that widely influenced the study and practice of Christian missions. His model of "critical contextualization" describes a process of understanding and evaluating cultural practices in light of biblical teaching. It is one of the most widely cited models in evangelical doctoral dissertations dealing with contextualization.

The concept of the "excluded middle" argued that most Westerners see the universe as consisting of two tiers - the invisible things of the other world, and the visible things of this world. In this way, they exclude the part in between - namely, the invisible things of this world, and in particular the unseen personal beings, such as angels and demons. Hiebert suggested that non-Westerners are much more likely to accept this "excluded middle".

Hiebert, who studied mathematics as an undergraduate, employed the idea of set theory to describe bounded sets versus centered or fuzzy sets as different ways of conceiving Christian community and theology.

== Selected bibliography ==
- Cultural Anthropology (1983)
- Anthropological Insights for Missionaries (1985)
- Anthropological Reflections on Missiological Issues (1994)
- Missiological Implications of Epistemological Shifts (1999)
- Transforming Worldview: An Anthropological Understanding of How People Change (2008)
- The Gospel in Human Contexts: Anthropological Explorations for Contemporary Missions (2009)
