= Shankarapur =

- Village
- Country: India
- State: Telangana

Languages
  - Official: Telugu
- Time zone: UTC+5:30 (IST)

Shankarapur is a village in Ranga Reddy district in Telangana, India. It falls under Shamshabad mandal. It is close to ORR and NH7.
