= Kothwalguda =

- Village
- Interactive map of Kothwalguda
- Country: India
- State: Telangana

Languages
  - Official: Telugu
- Time zone: UTC+5:30 (IST)

Kothwalguda is a village in Ranga Reddy district in Telangana, India. It falls under Shamshabad mandal.
