= Malkaram =

- Village
- Location in Telangana, India
- Coordinates: 17°32′N 78°35′E
- Country: India
- State: Telangana

Languages
  - Official: Telugu
- Time zone: UTC+5:30 (IST)
- Postal code: 501218

Malkaram is a village in Ranga Reddy district in Telangana, India. It falls under Shamshabad mandal.
