= Satamrai =

- Colony
- Location in Telangana, India Satamrai (Telangana) Satamrai (India)
- Coordinates: 17°16′40″N 78°23′15″E
- Country: India
- State: Telangana

Languages
  - Official: Telugu
- Time zone: UTC+5:30 (IST)

Satamrai is a village in Ranga Reddy district in Telangana, India. It falls under Shamshabad mandal. Satamrai is considered the next hub for businesses since it is connecting the road to Rajiv Gandhi International Airport.
