= Emil Wolfgang Menzel Jr. =

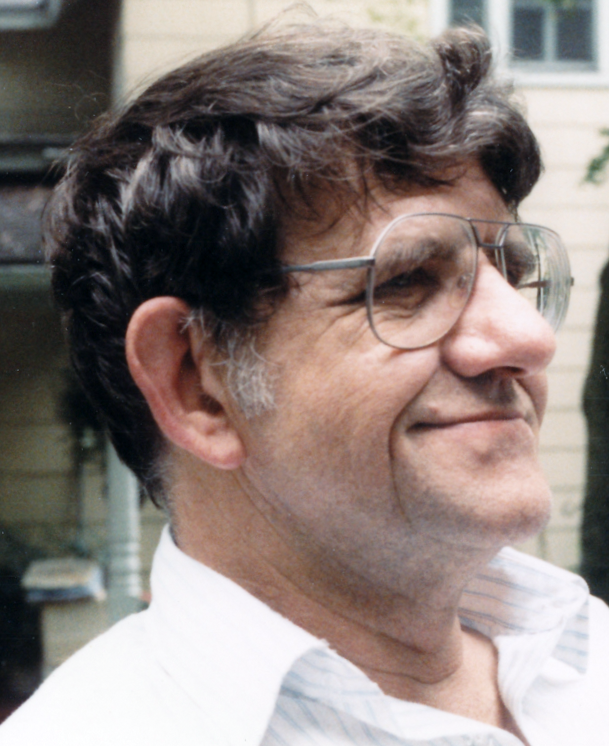
- Emil Wolfgang Menzel Jr.
- Born: April 16, 1929; Champa, India
- Died: April 7, 2012 (aged 82); Birmingham, Alabama
- Education: University of Michigan
- Known for: communication and cognition in chimpanzees
- Scientific career
- Fields: primatology, comparative psychology
- Workplaces: Yerkes Laboratories of Primate Biology in Orange Park, FL; Osaka University, Japan; the Delta Regional Primate Center in Covington, LA; Cayo Santiago, PR; Cambridge University, England; the Language Research Center in Atlanta, GA; Stony Brook University, NY

Emil Wolfgang Menzel Jr. (April 16, 1929 – April 7, 2012) was a prominent primatologist and comparative psychologist. In many ways, his pioneering observations and research laid the foundation and set the precedent for many contemporary research topics in psychology and primatology including nonverbal and gestural communication, theory of mind and behavioral economics.

== Early life ==
Emil Menzel was born in India to Ida and Emil Menzel Sr. A curious child, Emil's parents, both missionaries, encouraged him to develop interests in natural history, literature, and science and an appreciation for the uniqueness of individuals. He attended the Mount Hermon School in Darjeeling. Returning to the United States in 1941, Emil Menzel completed a BA in English and philosophy from Elmhurst College and a MA in English from the University of Michigan in 1951. After serving 2 years in the Korean War, earning the Combat Medical Badge, he returned to the United States, married in 1954, and completed a PhD in psychology from Vanderbilt University in 1958.

== Scientific career ==
Early in his career, Menzel studied a variety of species but his most significant scientific contributions came from his work with chimpanzees. He originally worked at the Yerkes National Primate Research Center, with Harry Nissen and Richard Davenport, as their studies examining the effect of different social rearing experiences on social and cognitive development were coming to an end.

In July 1966, while working with John A. Morrison for the NIH Laboratory of Perinatal Physiology in Puerto Rico, they performed an experiment in the adaptation of rhesus monkeys to a new environment. They translocated two-thirds of a naturally-formed social group of macaques (Macaca mulatta) from lush Cayo Santiago (Santiago Island), off the southeastern coast, to arid Desecheo Island, off the west coast. The two groups of monkeys were observed from July 1966 until May 1971. This experiment resulted in a classic publication in Wildlife Monographs.

Emil Menzel was perhaps most known for his work on communication and cognition with a group of chimpanzees living in a one-acre forest. His most famous studies involved experiments in which he would take a single individual in the group out into the forest and show them the location of food or other type of stimulus. After returning the knower chimpanzees to their group, he'd release the entire group into the forest. Menzel was interested in determining how the knower would communicate (intentionally or otherwise) and how they would navigate the forest. On the basis of his observations, he was able to describe the sophisticated means by which the chimpanzees would learn to follow or use social cues of the knower chimpanzee to make inferences about the location of the object or other properties of the stimuli. This work laid the foundation for his seminal papers on cognitive mapping and the representation of space

Another set of landmark studies by Menzel involved his descriptions of cooperative tool use in captive chimpanzees. While working at the Tulane Primate Center, a number of chimpanzees had learned to escape from their enclosure. The escapes almost always occurred after the researchers and care staff had left for the day, suggesting that the apes were inhibiting their behavior until circumstances were ripe for a break out. To find out what the chimpanzees were doing in their efforts to escape, Menzel and his colleagues set up a camera to film their behavior while no one was present. As it turned out, the chimpanzees were dragging long branches to the enclosure wall and holding the branches, like poles, which allowed the chimpanzees to scale the wall and leap over the top. Emil's demonstration of cooperative behavior by the chimpanzees remains at the forefront of current debates over the role of cooperation in the evolution of social cognition and language.

Though a naturalist and ethologist at heart, Emil Menzel did not sit idly as technology improved and allowed for alternative ways of testing chimpanzee cognition. He was one of the first scientists to use video technology to ask questions about chimpanzees' understanding spatial relations, particularly in regard to the use of ego- and allocentric cues.

Graduate students worked directly with Menzel on his studies aimed at assessing chimpanzee spatial cognition. In a number of experiments they showed the location of hidden foods to chimpanzees via television monitors and then mapped their travel patterns in locating the foods as well as their use of different landmarks in determining foraging patterns. His attention to detail was meticulous. Before testing, the students had to create a faithful pictorial representation of all the potential landmarks and features in the outside enclosure so that they could precisely determine their travel and foraging patterns. One day the students enlarged a pictorial representation of the chimpanzees' outside enclosure and simply pointed to the baited location in the enclosure on the map to see whether the apes would then immediately travel to that location (which they were able to do).

Similarly, in the late 1980s, when the joystick computer system for testing learning and cognition in monkeys and apes was developed at the Language Research Center, Menzel embraced this technology and developed his own tests. Two things were particularly noteworthy about his computer-based tests: First, they tended to be computerized versions of the field experiments that he or others in the discipline had conducted with nonhuman primates. For example, he developed computerized versions of the barrier problems used by Donald O. Hebb early in his career. In this way, Menzel's data were particularly valuable for grounding the new computer-task paradigm - in which animals were often performing tasks and demonstrating competencies never before documented in their species - in the rich, existing literature on animal foraging, way-finding, and learning. The second memorable aspect of this testing is that Menzel did his own computer programming, both of the actual tests that would be administered to the nonhuman primates and also of the data-analysis software that would simulate, often in real-time graphic representations on the screen, the various potential mechanisms that might explain the animals' behavior.

Menzel was a very productive scholar, but he was not motivated by amassing more publications. He remains one of the most highly respected researchers in primatology, but he seemed unconcerned about establishing a legacy associated with his name. Indeed, one quote from his writings took a playful jab at the tendency to name apparatus and paradigms after the scientist who developed or popularized them: "In the hope that I can make field work scientifically respectable, I have considered patenting the tree as the Menzel Jumping Stand, the river as the Tulane Obstruction Apparatus, and the jungle as the Delta Primate Center General Test Apparatus" (p. 80,). Rather, he was motivated by the data, and by the scholarly pursuit of knowledge about species in which he found fascination.

He retired in 1994 as Professor of Psychology from Stony Brook University, and moved to Birmingham, Alabama.
