= Chinna Gollapally =

- Panchayat
- Location in Telangana, India Chinna Gollapally (India)
- Coordinates: 17.237383°N 78.399038°E
- Country: India
- State: Telangana
- District: Ranga Reddy

Government
  - Body: Mandal Office
  - Sarpanch: Munugala Sudhaker Reddy

Languages
  - Official: Telugu
- Time zone: UTC+5:30 (IST)
- PIN: 501218
- Telephone code: 918413
- Vehicle registration: TS-28
- Lok Sabha constituency: Chevella
- Vidhan Sabha constituency: Rajendra Nagar
- Planning agency: Panchayat
- Civic agency: Mandal Office
- Website: telangana.gov.in

Chinna Gollapally is a Panchayat in Ranga Reddy district, Telangana, India. It falls under Shamshabad mandal. Munugala Sudhaker Reddy was the Sarpanch of this Gram Panchayat since 1988. The Panchayat has four villages: Chinna Gollapally, Peddha Gollapally, Galwaguda & Anantha Reddy Guda. Three villages in the Panchayat were given to the Rajiv Gandhi International Airport in 1998. The Panchayat now has only one Village called Peddha Gollapally.
