= Tondpalli =

- Village
- Location within Telangana Location within India
- Coordinates: 17°16′15″N 78°22′26″E
- Country: India
- State: Telangana

Languages
  - Official: Telugu
- Time zone: UTC+5:30 (IST)

Tondpalli is a village in Ranga Reddy district in Telangana, India. It falls under Shamshabad mandal.
