= Narkhuda =

Coordinates: 17°16′N 78°20′E

- Village
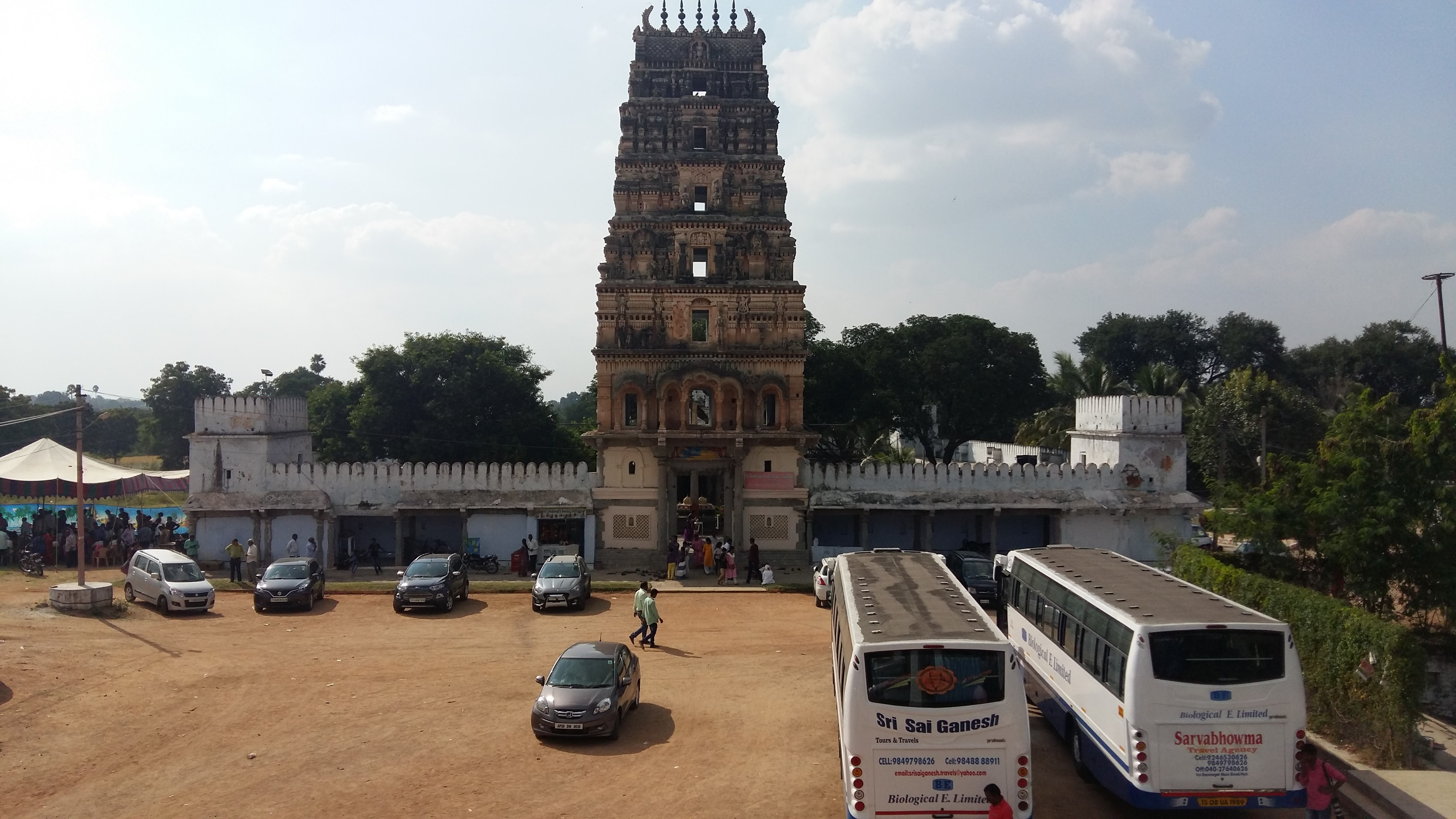
- Ammapally Sri Sita Rama Chandra Swamy Temple in Narkhuda
- Interactive map of Narkhuda
- Country: India
- State: Telangana
- Time zone: UTC+5:30 (IST)

Narkhuda is a village in Ranga Reddy district in Telangana, India. It falls under Shamshabad mandal. Village has Sri Ramachandra temple also known as Ammapalli temple, where Sri Rama kalyanam is celebrated grandly on occasion of Sri Ramanavami.
