= Ghansmiyaguda =

Ghansimiyaguda
- Village
- Country: India
- State: Telangana
- Founder: Pothanpally Jangaiah Goud

Government
  - Type: Grampanchayat
  - Body: MPTC, Sarpanch and ward members

Population (2018)1200
  - Total: 2,100

Languages
  - Official: Telugu తెలుగు
- Time zone: UTC+5:30 (IST)
- Postal code: 509325
- Vehicle registration: TS 07
- Website: telangana.gov.in

Ghansimiyanguda is a village in Ranga Reddy district in Telangana, India. It falls under Shamshabad mandal.
