= Pedda Golkonda =

- Village
- Country: India
- State: Telangana

Languages
  - Official: Telugu
- Time zone: UTC+5:30 (IST)
- Postal code: 501218

Pedda Golkonda is a village in Ranga Reddy district in Telangana, India. It falls under Shamshabad mandal.
