= Kacharam =

Kacharam Kacharam
- Village
- Nickname: No Nick Names
- Country: India
- State: Telangana
- Founder: None

Population (2011)
  - Total: 4,000
  - Rank: 14

Languages
  - Official: Telugu
- Time zone: UTC+5:30 (IST)
- Postal code: 501218
- Vehicle registration: TS

Kacharam is a village in Ranga Reddy district in Telangana state, India. It falls under Shamshabad mandal.
