= Hamidullanagar =

- Village
- Country: India
- State: Andhra Pradesh

Languages
  - Official: Telugu
- Time zone: UTC+5:30 (IST)

Hamidullanagar is a village in Ranga Reddy district in Telangana, India. It falls under Shamshabad mandal.
