= Nanjapur =

Coordinates: 12°52′N 75°56′E

- Village
- Interactive map of Nanjapur
- Country: India
- State: Andhra Pradesh

Languages
  - Official: Telugu
- Time zone: UTC+5:30 (IST)
- PIN: 501218
- Vehicle registration: ap 28

Nanjapur is a village in Ranga Reddy district in Andhra Pradesh, India. It falls under Shamshabad mandal.
