= Anilkumar John Servand =

Bishop Dr. Anilkumar John Servand Master, Serampore College (University)
- Born: 1 July 1955 (age 71); Mysore State, India
- Education: BSc, MSc (Karnatak), BEd, B.D. (Serampore), M.Th., PhD (Fuller),
- Occupation: Priest
- Years active: 1985-Present
- Known for: Ecclesiastical administration

Ecclesiastical career
- Religion: Christianity
- Church: Methodist Church in India Trust Association
- Ordained: 1986
- Writings: Servand, A.J. (1994). A study of Karma in Hindu and Indian Christian thought (PhD thesis). Fuller. OCLC 31978015.; Servand, A.J. (1991). The classical Hindu view of Christian conversion (Th.M. thesis). Fuller. OCLC 24560046.
- Congregations: Vasad and Baroda (Gujarat)
- Offices held: Principal, Methodist Bible Seminary, Vasad (Gujarat), Director, Methodist Technical Institute, Baroda (Gujarat),
- Title: Bishop Doctor

Anilkumar John Servand (born 1 July 1955) is an Indian Methodist prelate who serves as bishop of Bangalore in Karnataka. Since 2019, Servand has held the position of Master at Serampore College, India's first modern university.

== Early life and education ==
Anilkumar John Servand was born in Mysore State, India, on 1 July 1955. He studied at Karnatak University, Dharwad, Karnataka, and obtained a Master of Science degree, graduating in 1979. Servand began his career as a sales engineer in Ambalal Sarabhai Enterprises, a pharmaceutical conglomerate in Ahmedabad, Gujarat. He resigned from his position in the 1980s and entered the priesthood, joining a seminary affiliated to Serampore College, where he graduated in 1985. In the ensuing convocation of 1986, Servand was awarded a Bachelor of Divinity degree by the master of the convocation, A. D. Khan of the Indian Civil Service.

A multi-disciplinary academic, Servand has performed studies in the fields of science, education, and theology. In the 1990s, he traveled to the United States and joined the Fuller Theological Seminary in Pasadena, California, where he majored in intercultural theology, earning a Master of Theology degree and a doctorate.

== Career ==
Following Servand's ordination in the Methodist Church in India in the late 1980s, he began his ministry, teaching theology at the Methodist Bible Seminary in Vasad, Gujarat. He was elected as bishop of the Mumbai and North India regional conferences of the Methodist Church of India, and was also the director of the Methodist Technical Institute in Baroda, Gujarat.

In addition to his role as bishop, Servand also serves as a chairperson of the following organizations:

- Warne Baby Fold in Bareilly, Uttar Pradesh.
- Mount Hermon School, Darjeeling, West Bengal.
- Hutchings School in Talegaon, Maharashtra.

Servand is also chief acharya at the Sattal Christian Ashram in Sattal, Uttarakhand. On 1 June 2019, he succeeded John Sadananda of the Church of South India as Master of Serampore College.

Honorary titles
Preceded by John Sadananda; 2010–2019	Master; Serampore College (University), Serampore (West Bengal); 1 June 2019–Present	Succeeded by Incumbent
