= Gnana Robinson =

Indian biblical scholar (1935–2019)

- Born: 17 March 1935; Kanyakumari District, Tamil Nadu, British India
- Died: 3 February 2019 (aged 83); Florida, U.S.
- Other names: Gnana
- Education: Scott Christian College, Nagercoil (BSc); United Theological College, Bengaluru (BD) & (M.Th.); Union Theological Seminary in the City of New York (Th.M.); University of Hamburg, Hamburg (Dr. Theol.)
- Church: Church of South India, Diocese of Kanyakumari
- Ordained: 7 May 1961
- Writings: The Origin and Development of the Old Testament Sabbath: A comprehensive exegetical approach, Peter Lang, Frankfurt am Main, 1988, ISBN 3-8204-1373-1 Influences of Hinduism on Christianity, TTS, Madurai, 1980 Let us be like the Nations: A Commentary on the Books of I & II Samuel, Handsel Press, 1993, ISBN 0-8028-0608-2 Is 2 Kings XI 6 a Gloss?, Vetus Testamentum, Volume 27, January 1977, pp. 56–61
- Congregations served: Diocese of Kanyakumari
- Offices held: Presbyter-in-charge, Professor of Old Testament.: Principal of; Tamil Nadu Theological Seminary, Madurai; United Theological College, Bengaluru
- Title: Reverend Doctor

Gnana Robinson (17 March 1935 – 3 February 2019) was an Indian Biblical scholar who studied the Old Testament.

== Biography ==
Robinson was born into a Christian family who were communicant members of what was then the South India United Church. He was educated in Eraniel in the Kanyakumari district of Tamil Nadu, India. Robinson later studied at Scott Christian College and obtained a Bachelor of Science degree in mathematics.

Robinson decided to pursue the priesthood, and his Church sponsored his theological studies. In 1957, Robinson joined the United Theological College and enrolled himself for a Bachelor of Divinity degree which he completed by 1960.

Later, his Church assigned him a pastoral role, and Robinson served as Presbyter-in-Charge of the Kanyakumari District.

Robinson was zealous for his studies and obtained permission from his diocese to pursue a Master of Theology degree in Bengaluru. Robinson chose to specialise in Old Testament studies and studied between 1961 – 1963.

Robinson left India in 1964 for North America and joined the Union Theological Seminary of New York City and obtained a Master of Sacred Theology degree. Gnana also did a course in the Tantur Ecumenical Institute for Theological Studies in Israel.

Robinson went on to pursue doctoral studies in the University of Hamburg in Germany. He registered himself at the School of Evangelical Theology and obtained a Doctor of Theology degree 1975. Robinson considered Klaus Koch, a professor at the university and a notable Old Testament scholar, to be his guru.

== Professorship ==
Robinson began his teaching career at what was then the Tamil Nadu Theological College (now the Tamil Nadu Theological Seminary) in 1962. In 1987, Robinson accepted an invitation from the Predigerseminar at Soest, Germany to teach there. Later that year, however, the Principal of the United Theological College in Bengaluru, India, Rev. Dr. E. C. John, retired, and the school formed a committee to find a replacement. Robinson accepted their invitation to return to India and become Principal there, and also headed their Department of Old Testament studies.

Professor Gnana has been invited to other institutions as well, where he taught for shorter periods of time. He was visiting professor at the University of Hamburg in 1982, and also taught at the St. Andrew's Theological College in the West Indies that same year. He taught at the Andover Newton Theological School in Massachusetts in 1983 as well as at the Lincoln Theological College in the United Kingdom.

== Honours ==
While serving as the Principal of UTC, Bengaluru, friends of the Professor brought out a 377-page festschrift in his honour edited by his junior colleague Rev. Dr. D. Jones Muthunayagam entitled Bible Speaks Today: Essays in honour of Gnana Robinson, ISPCK, 2000, ISBN 81-7214-545-4

== Senate of Serampore College (University) ==
The Senate of Serampore College, West Bengal, the first University in India with degree-granting authority elected Gnana Robinson as its president in 1986. He was preceded by Rev. Dr. C. D. Jathanna. Rev. Gnana continued as its president till 1988 and was succeeded by Dr. Jacob Verghis.

Again in the year 1997, Rev. Gnana was elected as the President and was later succeeded by Rev. Dr. J. W. Gladstone in the year 2000.

Robinson was acknowledged to have provided leadership to the Senate which has over fifty theological colleges from South Asia affiliated to it.

== Retirement and death ==
After retiring as the Principal of the UTC, Bengaluru, Gnana was invited by the Lutheran Theological Seminary in Philadelphia where he was visiting professor until 2001. He later returned to India, residing in Tamil Nadu, and was extensively involved in developmental activities. Gnana died in Nagercoil, Kanyakumari district on 3 February 2019, at the age of 83.

== Development initiatives ==
For Rev. Robinson, theology did not mean existence within the seminary walls. He founded many development initiatives in Tamil Nadu. Prof. Gnana, as Principal of UTC, Bengaluru commissioned a team of volunteers along with the Ramakrishna Mission, Bengaluru to provide relief to the earthquake-affected people in Latur, Maharashtra.

Gnana founded the Peace Trust, Kanyakumari. He also is a member on the following societies:

- Bullock cart Workers' Development Association,
- Peoples Association for Social Action,
- Center for Rural Education and Employment for Development.

== See also ==
- Victor Premasagar
- Gerhard von Rad
- Senate of Serampore College (University)
- University of Hamburg
- Tamil Nadu Theological Seminary

Honorary titles
Preceded by Renthy Keitzer, C. D. Jathanna	President, Senate of Serampore College (University), Serampore, West Bengal; 1997–1999; 1986–1988	Succeeded by Rev. Dr. J. W. Gladstone, Dr. Jacob Verghis
Academic offices
Preceded by E. C. John, CSI	Principal, United Theological College, Bengaluru; 1993–1999	Succeeded by O. V. Jathanna, CSI
Preceded by Samuel Amirtham, CSI	Principal, Tamil Nadu Theological Seminary, Madurai; 1978-1987	Succeeded by Kambar Manickam, TELC
