= Jukal, Iran =

Jukal جوكال
- Village
- Location within Iran
- Coordinates: 36°40′06″N 59°06′10″E
- Country: Iran
- Province: Razavi Khorasan
- County: Chenaran
- Bakhsh: Central
- Rural District: Chenaran

Population (2006)
  - Total: 165
- Time zone: UTC+3:30 (IRST)
  - Summer (DST): UTC+4:30 (IRDT)

Jukal (Persian: جوكال, also Romanized as Jūkāl) is a village in Chenaran Rural District, in the Central District of Chenaran County, Razavi Khorasan Province, Iran. At the 2006 census, its population was 165, in 44 families.
