= Mount Hermon School, Darjeeling =

Mount Hermon School
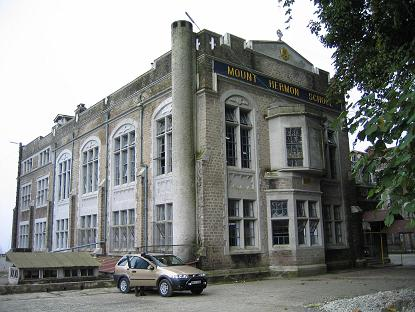

Location
- Darjeeling, West Bengal; India; 27.0655829°N 88.2506905°E

Information
- Type: Private
- Motto: Non Scholæ Sed Vitæ Discimus; (Not For School But For Life We Learn)
- Established: 11 March 1895; 131 years ago
- Chairman: Bishop Dr. Anilkumar John Servand, MCI
- Administrator: Rev. Kamalaksha Sardar
- Principal: Mr. Partha P Dey
- Campus: Darjeeling
- Colours: Yellow, dark blue
- Website: mhsdarj1895.org

Mount Hermon School is a co-educational Christian boarding school in the town of Darjeeling, in the Indian state of West Bengal. It is located in North Point, Singmari. It follows British style education as the founders were British. It prepares children for ICSE (for grade 10) and ISC (for grade 12). Mount Hermon offers classes in science, humanities, and commerce. More than 25 languages are spoken among the student body.

== History ==
Mount Hermon School was founded in 1895 by Emma L. Knowles of the British Methodist Episcopal Church, who became its first principal. The school was first known as Arcadia and later as Queen's Hill School. It was originally a girls' school, with a small department for junior boys. In 1926, the school was moved to North Point, where the main building was erected in the Mount Hermon Estate, purchased from Lebong Tea Company during a slump in the tea market for a relatively low price by Bishop Fisher. The new building was opened in May by the Earl of Lytton, Governor of Bengal and was described as "designed in Collegiate Gothic with Tudor arches and mullioned windows dominating it". The school grew and expanded into a co-educational school with a separate hostel area.

In 1918, the total enrollment was 163 students, and by 1929, the number of students grew to some 200 students, three quarters of them young women. In 1930, the school was renamed and had two wings: Queen's Hill School for Girls and Bishop Fisher's School for Boys. In the years under principal David Stewart, enrollment grew to 400 students, and in 1963, the multipurpose Stewart Building was opened next to the main building. Later, The Mount Hermon College of Education for undergraduate teacher trainees was added, as well as more hostels and laboratories.

== Campus ==
The school stands on 49 hectares (120 acres) in the Himalayan foothills, 1,900 metres (6,200 ft) above sea-level and 4 kilometres (2.5 mi) north of Darjeeling. It can accommodate 450 boarding students.

The main building has a three-storey structure of native grey stone and reinforced concrete, with a northern facade of 61 metres (200 ft) facing across the valley at Kanchenjunga. To the south are two wings, the west housing the chapel and assembly hall, and the east including classrooms, dormitories, and staff accommodations. All girls and the younger boys are housed in dormitories in the main building, which also contains an Infant Department and Junior School classrooms, a music room and practice rooms for piano, staff and students' dining rooms, lounge, library, craft room, and administrative offices. Senior boys (from class 10 to 12) reside in Fernhill and students from class 7 to 9 in the Round Hostel, opened in 1977, while junior boys reside in the Stewart Building, built in 1963.

The Stewart Building also includes six classrooms for the senior school, and laboratories for physics, chemistry, biology, and geography.

== Notable alumni ==
- Altamas Kabir – Chief Justice of India and Judge, Supreme Court of India
- Emil Wolfgang Menzel Jr. – primatologist and Professor of Psychology
- Tom Stoppard – English playwright, attended the school from 1943 to 1946
- Rinchen Dolma Taring, first General Secretary of Tibetan Homes Foundation
- Tsering Yangzom – Tibetan noble and wife of Jigme Palden Dorji, the first Prime Minister of Bhutan

== See also ==
- Education in India
- List of schools in India
- Education in West Bengal
