= Vasad =

Vasad Vasudhanagari
- Town
- Vasad
- Location in Gujarat, India Vasad (India)
- Coordinates: 22.4500°N 73.0667°E
- Country: India
- State: Gujarat
- District: Anand

Government
  - Type: Gram panchayat
  - Sarpanch: Poonambhai D. Parmar
  - Deputy Sarpanch: Deepbhai P. Patel
- Elevation: 18.89 m (62.0 ft)

Population (2013)
  - Total: 14,384

Languages
  - Official: Gujarati, Hindi
- Time zone: UTC+5:30 (IST)
- PIN: 388306
- Area code: 02692
- Vehicle registration: GJ

Vasad is a town located in the Anand district of Gujarat, India. Situated on the northern bank of the Mahi River, it serves as a gateway to the Charotar region. The town is approximately 15 kilometers south of Anand, the district headquarters.

== Demographics ==
As per the 2011 Census of India, Vasad has a population of 14,384 residents, comprising 7,530 males and 6,854 females. The town boasts a high literacy rate of 80.12%, with male literacy at 84.18% and female literacy at 75.66%. The community is diverse, with various cultural and religious groups coexisting harmoniously.
