= Tamil Nadu Theological Seminary =

- Motto: Via, Veritas, Vita
- Motto in English: The Way, The Truth, The Life
- Type: Private
- Established: 28 October 1969
- Affiliations: Senate of Serampore College (University), Madurai Kamaraj University
- Principal: The Rev. Dr. Margaret Kalaiselvi
- Location: Madurai, Tamil Nadu, India; 9°55′30.52″N 78°6′5.98″E
- Website: https://ttsarasaradi.org/

Tamil Nadu Theological Seminary (TTS) is an ecumenical seminary in Madurai, South India. TTS is affiliated with the Senate of Serampore College and Madurai Kamaraj University. The Principal is Rev. Dr. Margaret Kalaiselvi. The seminary celebrated its 50th Seminary Day on 28 October 2018.

== History ==
The Tamil Nadu Theological Seminary (TTS) was inaugurated in 1969, with the erstwhile ‘Tamilnadu Theological College’ at Thirumaraiyur of the Church of South India and the ‘Gurusala’ at Tranquebar of the Tamil Evangelical Lutheran Church and the Arcot Lutheran Church being brought together to form this new seminary. It was the first fruit of the talks on ecumenical relations between the CSI and the Lutheran Churches in Tamil Nadu. While it trains pastors for the Tamil Churches, it also provides opportunities for candidates from the neighbouring states and countries as well as ecumenical students from overseas to join this seminary for regular training and special courses for short periods.

TTS has structured its training programmes with a focus on threefold formation: Personal Formation, Theological Formation and Ministerial Formation. TTS is affiliated to the Senate of Serampore College/University and offers courses such as the Bachelor of Divinity (B.Div.) in Tamil medium, Master of Theology (Th.M.) in English medium (Old Testament, New Testament, History of Christianity, Social Analysis, Christian Theology, Christian Ministry and Communication) and Doctor of Theology (Th.D.) in English medium (Social Analysis, History of Christianity and New Testament). But recently it's providing Th.M. in Communication and Social Analysis. The college was in news in 2016, for encouraging pastors to be inclusive of the LGBTQ community.

It also offers Bachelor of Christian Studies (BCS) and Diploma in Christian Studies for external students. TTS is also affiliated to the Madurai Kamaraj University and offers certificate and diploma in German language and certificate and diploma in Ambedkar studies. The seminary on its own offers the certificate course on ‘Mission and Ministry’, ‘Certificate of Theology’, certificate and diploma courses on ‘Ministry among Church Women’ and an ecumenical programme for international students.

Theological education through involvement has been given practical expression from the early days of TTS. Constant relationship with the surrounding churches, indigenous forms of worship and concrete programmes under Ministry to the Prisoners, Rights of Women and Children, Development of the poor and the downtrodden in the slums, mainly organizing the unorganized, Empowerment of the Dalits, Church Women center, interfaith dialogue are examples of this expression. The Social Analysis Centre, Communication Centre and the Dalit Resource Centre are widening the seminary's theological insights and paraxis.

Programmes and institutions like the Unemployed Young People's Association (UYPA), Inba Illam – the home for the aged and Arulagam – the Home for the destitute women, continue to be supported by TTS although they function as independent institutions. The Rural Theological Institute (RTI), a unit of TTS, is another example of theological education through involvement with the problems of Dalits, poors, women, and the children of the surrounding villages. The students’ programmes such as Intensive Practical Exposures, Living with people in the city, Internship and living in the Villages are also inbuilt into the academic programme of the seminary with similar concerns.

Community life is the foremost aspect of the theological training in TTS. The chapel stands at the center of the campus integrating the study in class rooms, library and life in the hostel and family quarters. A family atmosphere is created within the campus. The staff and students are encouraged to develop a close relationship with each other. The usual forms of addressing staff and students as, ‘Anna’ (elder brother), ‘Thambi’ (younger brother) ‘Akka’ (elder sister), ‘Thangai’ (younger sister), ‘Uncle’ and ‘Aunty’ are considered as expressions of this intimacy. Apart from regular morning worship in the chapel, intercessory prayers, cottage prayers, evening prayers in the hostels, the Eucharistic celebration on every Sunday evening followed by community dinner, fellowship group get-together or "Ore Ulai" on the last Wednesdays of every month are meant to promote spirituality and relationship with one another within the TTS community.

Thus, TTS tries to stand as an ecumenical, indigenous and encountering Theological Seminary.

The 86th birth anniversary of Rev. Dhaynchand Carr, former Principal were held in March 2023.

Succession of Principals
- The Rev. Samuel Amirtham, CSI, Dr. Theol. (Hamburg),
- The Rev. Gnana Robinson, CSI, Dr. Theol. (Hamburg),
- The Rev. P. Kambar Manickam, TELC, S. T. M. (Luther Seminary),
- The Rev. Dhyanchand Carr, CSI, Ph. D. (London),
- The Rev. P. Mohan Larbeer, Ph. D. (Madurai),
- The Rev. M. Gnanavaram, CSI, Ph. D. (Coventry)

== See also ==
- Category:Tamil Nadu Theological Seminary alumni
- Category:Academic staff of Tamil Nadu Theological Seminary
