= People's Reporter =

People's Reporter (A forum of current affairs)
- Format: Compact (newspaper)
- Owner(s): New Education and Welfare Trust
- Founder(s): Sri Godfrey Raymond Karat (10.3.1924 - 2.9.2007)
- Publisher: Sri Vattukalathil Chacko John
- Editor-in-chief: Prof. Mammen Varkey, D. D. (Serampore)
- Launched: 21 October 1988; 37 years ago
- Language: English language
- Headquarters: Mumbai
- City: Mumbai
- Country: India
- RNI: 45550/88

People's Reporter (A forum of current affairs) (established in 1988) is a semi-monthly newspaper published from Mumbai, especially on events covering Ecumenism and Interfaith dialogue, both nationally and internationally.

Though the newspaper is available in print edition, it is also made available in pdf format through many other web sites which host it, namely, SlideShare, Dockoc, Academia.edu, Jaffna Diocese of the Church of South India, the National Council of Churches in India, Radicalizing reformation. and the Social Sciences Institute of the Evangelical Church in Germany.
