= Jukal, India =

Jukal
- Village
- Location in Telangana, India
- Coordinates: 18°21′N 77°37′E
- Country: India
- State: Telangana

Area
  - Total: 1 km^{2} (0.39 sq mi)

Population (2001)
  - Total: 700
  - Density: 700/km^{2} (1,800/sq mi)

Languages
  - Official: Telugu
- Time zone: UTC+5:30 (IST)
- PIN: 501218
- Telephone code: 08413
- Vehicle registration: 28
- Sex ratio: 5:1 ♂/♀

Jukal is a village in Ranga Reddy district in Telangana, India. It falls under Shamshabad mandal. The population of the village is 700.
