= Conference of the Mennonite Brethren Churches in India =

Mennonite denomination in India

Mennonite Brethren Church of India
- Abbreviation: MBCI
- Classification: Protestant
- Orientation: Mainline Anabaptist
- Polity: Mixed polity with congregational, and presbyterian
- President: P B Arnold
- Distinct fellowships: Mennonite World Conference
- Region: Telangana, Andhra Pradesh
- Headquarters: Jadcherla, India
- Independence: 1982
- Branched from: American Mennonite Brethren Mission
- Congregations: 840
- Members: 120000
- Ministers: 40
- Places of worship: 25
- Hospitals: 2
- Secondary schools: 6

Conference of the Mennonite Brethren Churches in India is a Mennonite denomination in India. Its membership exceeds 100,000 persons, in 840 congregations. The Presiding officer for the conference is Dr P B Arnold. The headquarters is in Jadcherla, Telangana. It is a member of the Mennonite World Conference.

The Conference also runs a Medical Center at Jadcherla by name M B Medical Center many patients are treated here. It was established in 19th century from its inception it has been doing a great service to the people. There is a proposal for a Medical College. The Mennonite Brethren Centenary Bible College is the theological arm of the Conference with affiliation to the Senate of Serampore College (University).

As of 1957 it was Telugu-speaking and in Andhra Pradesh. At this point, its membership is about 1% of the population of Andhra Pradesh.

== Origin ==
The Conference of the Mennonite Brethren Churches of India began like many other global church communities: with mission. Mennonite Brethren Church in Russia sent their first missionaries, Abraham J. and Maria Friesen, to India in 1889. Abraham and Maria started the first mission station in Nalgonda, India. Miss Anna Suderman, also an American, joined them later that year. The American Mennonite Brethren's first mission station in India was started in Hughestown the same year. Russian and American Mennonite Brethren mutually ran mission work until 1914 when the American Missionaries gained complete control of foreign Mennonite Brethren Mission work in India. This work was affiliated with American Baptist Telugu Mission and after the discontinuation of MB Mission from Russia after World War I broke out in 1914, the whole work was taken by Baptist Mission. Andhra Mennonite Brethren Convention went on to become The Conference of the Mennonite Brethren Churches in India and became independent from foreign missionaries in 1957, but did not have full independence until 1973. |Although the Yarrow Statement was completed in 1957 it is not until 1973 that the Conference of the Mennonite Brethren Churches of India becomes an independent body from American Mennonite Brethren Missions. In 2010, it has a special ceremony to commemorate being the first missions place.

As of 2010, Conference of Mennonite Brethren Churches of India included 840 congregations and 103,488 members.

=== Major challenges ===
The India church struggles with leadership. When the church was first independent from foreign missions the leadership had conflicts rooted in "regional, family, and other social considerations…," which led to lawsuits over church power. India has a lack of qualified pastors. Rev. Dr. R.S. Lemuel, Chairman of Mennonite Brethren Board of Theological Education, says that in 1999 there were "837 M.B. Congregations and only about 197 trained pastors." India has a caste system, which primarily oppresses the Harijans group (all known as the lower class). Historically, the Mennonite Brethren church in India has also seen conversions from Islam; one mission station relocated following the conversion of several Muslims to Christianity.

The administration of the Governing Council had approved a mortgage amounting to Rs.38 Crores from various banks by using many of the properties associated to the Conference which were accumulated by the missionaries for various purposes of community development and welfare activities, such as schools, hospitals and boarding for underprivileged children. As of February 2016 the loan has not been repaid, thus the lenders are proceeding with an auction sale of the properties at Jadcherla on which the Mennonite Brethren Medical Center is present.

=== Key people ===
- P. B. Arnold- Dr. Arnold took over the Jadcharla Medical Center when the American Missionaries left.
- Rev. Dr. R. S. Lemuel, President, Board of Evangelism & Church Ministries, Board of Theological Education and Vice President Mennonite Brethren Conference of India.
- Rev. Dr. I.P. Asheervadam, Principal, MBC Bible College, Shamshabad (2011–present).
- Rev.V.K.Rufus, Former Principal, Mennonite Brethren Centenary Bible College in Shamshabad, India
- Rev. Solomon Sowlollu, M.A., M.A., B.D., M.Phil, CTP. Former vice-principal of the Mennonite Brethren Centenary Bible College in Shamshabad, India
- P. Abraham Prakash, Principal of MBC Junior college, Mahabubnagar
- Dr. E.D. Solomon, M.Th (New Testament), Ph.D. Senior Faculty and Vice Principal of Mennonite Brethren Centenary Bible College in Shamshabad, India and Director of Development.
- Rev. M.J. Krupaiah as Honorary Treasurer
- Rev. David Jakkula, M.A Public and personnel management [M.A., LLB], Executive Director at Mennonite Brethren Development Organization.
