= Journal of the Henry Martyn Institute =

- Discipline: Religious studies
- Language: English
- Edited by: Packiam T. Samuel

Publication details
- Former names: News and Notes (1911-1941); The Bulletin of Christian Institutes of Islamic Studies (1941-1960); Bulletin of the Henry Martyn Institute of Islamic Studies (1960-1972) and 1978-1998); Al-Basheer: A Bulletin of Christian Institutes of Islamic Studies (1972-1976)
- History: 1911–present
- Publisher: Henry Martyn Institute (India)
- Frequency: Biannual

Standard abbreviations
- ISO 4: J. Henry Martyn Inst.

Indexing
- ISSN: 0970-6445
- LCCN: 88659516
- OCLC no.: 977584313

Links
- Journal homepage

Journal of the Henry Martyn Institute is a biannual scholarly journal published by Henry Martyn Institute, Hyderabad, India on disciplines encompassing religion, culture and interfaith relations and could be found in nearly 100 libraries worldwide. It promotes inter-religious understanding with a special focus on the study of Islam.

== History ==
The Journal of the Henry Martyn Institute traces its beginnings to the year 1911, when it appeared as News and Notes. Subsequently, in the year 1941, it became known as The Bulletin of Christian Institutes of Islamic Studies and by 1960, the title was once again changed to Bulletin of the Henry Martyn Institute of Islamic Studies. Then in the year 1972, it was changed to Al-Basheer: A Bulletin of Christian Institutes of Islamic Studies, which retained the title until 1976. Again from the year 1978 onwards, it reverted its title to Bulletin of the Henry Martyn Institute of Islamic Studies. Finally, since 1998, it took the name as Journal of the Henry Martyn Institute, which stands good till date. During mid-nineties, the publishers provided a trail of the journal under various names. Similarly, an external researcher, Binod Peter Senapati provided a brief note on constant name changes of the journal.

== Abstracting and indexing ==
The journal is indexed by Atla Religion Database, Ulrich's International Periodical Directory, Periodica Islamica, and Guide to Indian Periodical Literature. In the year 1998, the publisher made some attempts to list out articles that appeared in its journal from 1942 through 1986.

== Editorial team ==
A four-member editorial team of learned Scholars edits the journal,

- Prof. Akhtarul Wasey, M. A. (Aligarh), Consulting Editor,
- Dr. S. S. Waheedulla Hussaini Multani, Ph. D. (Osmania), associate editor,
- Dr. M. M. Abraham, Ph. D. (JMI), editor,
- Dr. Packiam T. Samuel, Ph. D. (Oxford Brookes), editor-in-chief

== See also ==
- Indian Journal of Theology,
- National Council of Churches Review,
- People's Reporter,
- Sowing Circle
