= Shamshabad, Hyderabad =

Shamshabad
- Town
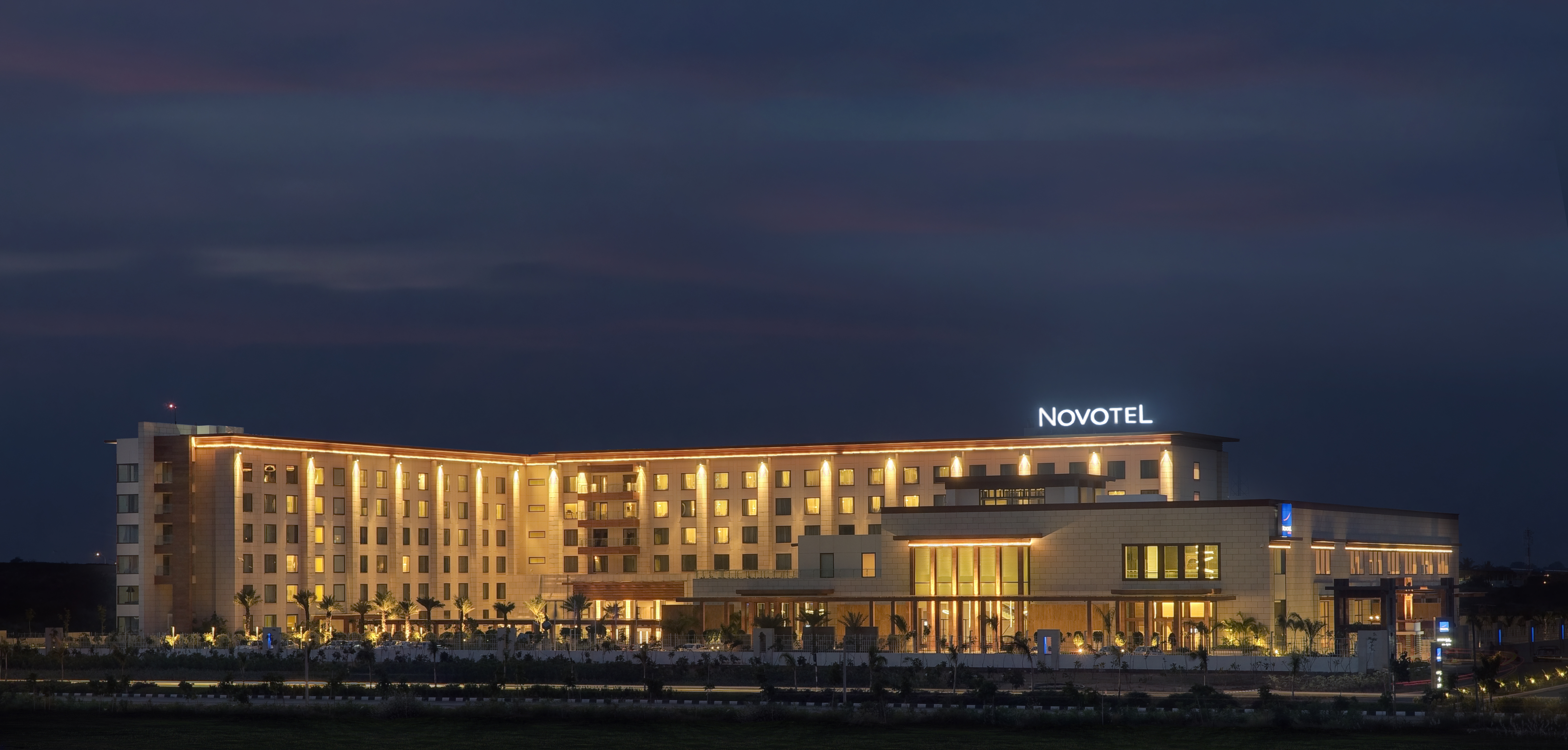
- Novotel Hyderabad Airport exterior

- Location in Hyderabad, India Shamshabad (India)
- Coordinates: 17.2603°N 78.3969°E
- Country: India
- State: Telangana
- District: Ranga Reddy
- Metropolitan: Hyderabad Metropolitan Region
- Founder: Paigah
- Named for: Shams-ul-Umra

Area
  - Total: 17.8 km^{2} (6.9 sq mi)
- Elevation: 574 m (1,883 ft)

Population (2011)
  - Total: 32,581
  - Density: 1,830/km^{2} (4,740/sq mi)
- Demonym: Hyderabadi

Languages
  - Official: Telugu, Urdu
- Time zone: UTC+5:30 (IST)
- PIN: 501218
- Vehicle registration: TG-07

Shamshabad is a suburb located in the south west part of Hyderabad city in the Indian state of Telangana. It is located in Shamshabad mandal of Rajendranagar revenue division. Sri Vendikonda Siddalingeswara Devastanam temple is situated in Siddulagutta Road in Shamshabad mandal. The international airport of Hyderabad is located here.

== History ==
The area was previously known as Sedanti village, which was later renamed Shamsabad in reference to Shams-ul-Umra, the title bestowed upon "Abul Fateh Khan", Tegh Jung, Shams-ud-Daula, Shams-ul-Mulk and Shams-ul-Umrah ("The Sun among the Nobles"), who founded the Paigah nobility during the reign of Nizam II, Mir Nizam Ali Khan (1762–1803). There was a time when the whole of the Shamsabad area was under the direct control of Paigah, including the location where the new airport has been built. The entire Shamsabad village was granted to Nawab Shams-ul-Umara Bahadur as a reward. Nawab Moin-Ud-Dowlah Bahadur Asman Jah, a leading Paigah noble, built a country home on a hillock and a race course in Shamsabad for his own use. As happened with other locality names, Shamsabad too got corrupted and over the years came to be called Shamshabad.

There is a railway station at Shamshabad by the name Umdanagar, which is part of the South Central Railway, Indian Railways.

== Geography ==
Shamshabad is located at 17.2603°N 78.3969°E. It has an average elevation of 574 metres (1,886 ft).

== Rajiv Gandhi International Airport ==
Shamshabad is the location of the Rajiv Gandhi International Airport, which began operations on 23 March 2008.

== Metro station ==
Hyderabad Airport Express Metro has a metro station planned at airport in Shamshabad mandal.

== Panchayats ==
There are 24 panchayats in the Shamshabad mandal.

- Chinna Golkonda (village and panchayat)
- Chinna Gollapally (village and panchayat)
- Ghansimiyaguda (village and panchayat)
- Hamidullanagar (village and panchayat)
- Jukal (village and panchayat)
- Kacharam (village and panchayat)
- Kavvaguda (village and panchayat)
- Kothwalguda (village and panchayat)
- Madanpally (village and panchayat)
- Malkaram (village and panchayat)
- Muchintal (village and panchayat)
- Nanjapur (village and panchayat)
- Narkhuda (village and panchayat)
- Ootpally (village and panchayat)
- Palamakole (village and panchayat)
- Pedda Golkonda (village and panchayat)
- Pedda Shapur (village and panchayat)
- Pedda Tupra (village and panchayat)
- Ramanujpur (village and panchayat)
- Satamrai (village and panchayat)
- Shamshabad (village and panchayat)
- Shankarapur (village and panchayat)
- Sultanpally (village and panchayat)
- Tondpalli (village and panchayat)
