= Jaygopal Tarkalankar =

Famous bengali writer and Sanskrit scholar (1775–1846)

Jaygopal Tarkalankar জয়গোপাল তর্কালঙ্কার
- Born: 7 October 1775; Ghritapur Village, Keshiary, British India (now, Paschim Medinipur, West Bengal, India)
- Died: 13 April 1846 (aged 70); Calcutta, Bengal, British India
- Occupations: Writer; Scholar
- Notable work: Krishvavisayakshlokah (1817); Shikshasar (1818); Krishvavisayakshlokah (1817); Chandi(1819); Patrer Dhara (1821); Babgavidhan (1838); Paraseek Avidhan (1838)

Jaygopal Tarkalankar (Bengali: জয়গোপাল তর্কালঙ্কার; 7 October 1775 – 13 April 1846) was a Bengali writer and Sanskrit scholar. One of his descendants Sri Ankur Bhattacharya lived in Nabadwip, Nandipara in Nadia district.

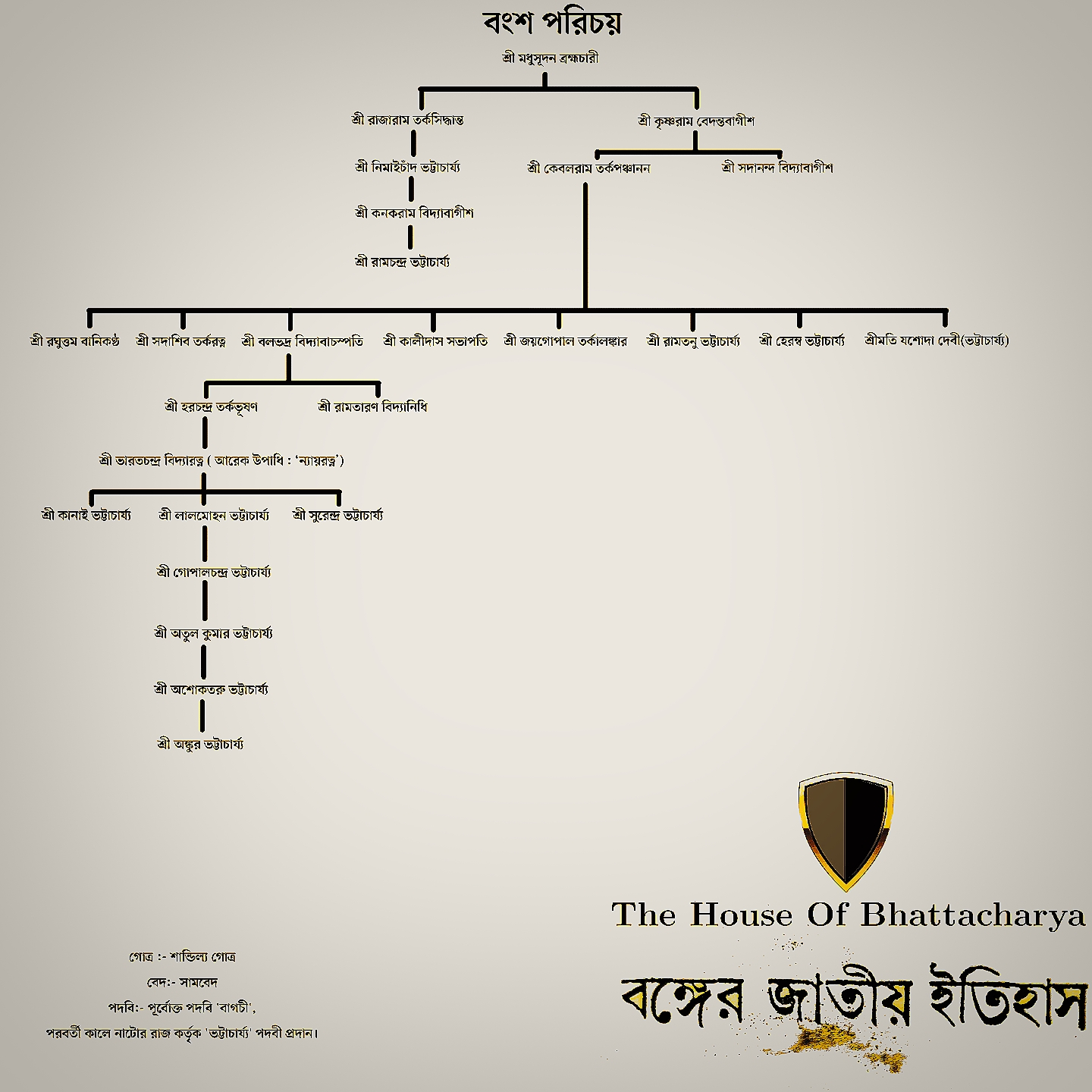
Founded and created in 2024

== Early life ==
Tarkalankar was born in 1775 at Ghritapur village, Keshiary in British India. He completed his primary education from his father, Pandit Kebalram Tarkapanchanan.

== Career ==
Tarkalankar went to Benaras and worked with Henry Thomas Colebrooke. He taught Colebrooke Bengali and Sanskrit, and helped him translation projects. He worked under William Carey from 1805 to 1823 in Serampur where he composed Shikshasar. Tarkalankar also worked with John Clark Marshman and published Samachar Darpan. Immediately after its establishment of Sanskrit College in 1824 he was appointed as lecturer of Vernacular Literature. In his 22 years teaching career he taught Ishwar Chandra Vidyasagar and Madan Mohan Tarkalankar. His principal aim was to re-develop the Bengali language by ridding it of its Perso-Arabic influences. Tarkalankar revised versions of Krittivas's Ramayana and Mahabharata of Kashiram Das which were published from Serampore Mission Press in 1834 and 1836 respectively.

== Works ==
- Shikshasar
- Krishvavisayakshlokah
- Chandi
- Patrer Dhara
- Babgavidhan
- Paraseek Avidhan

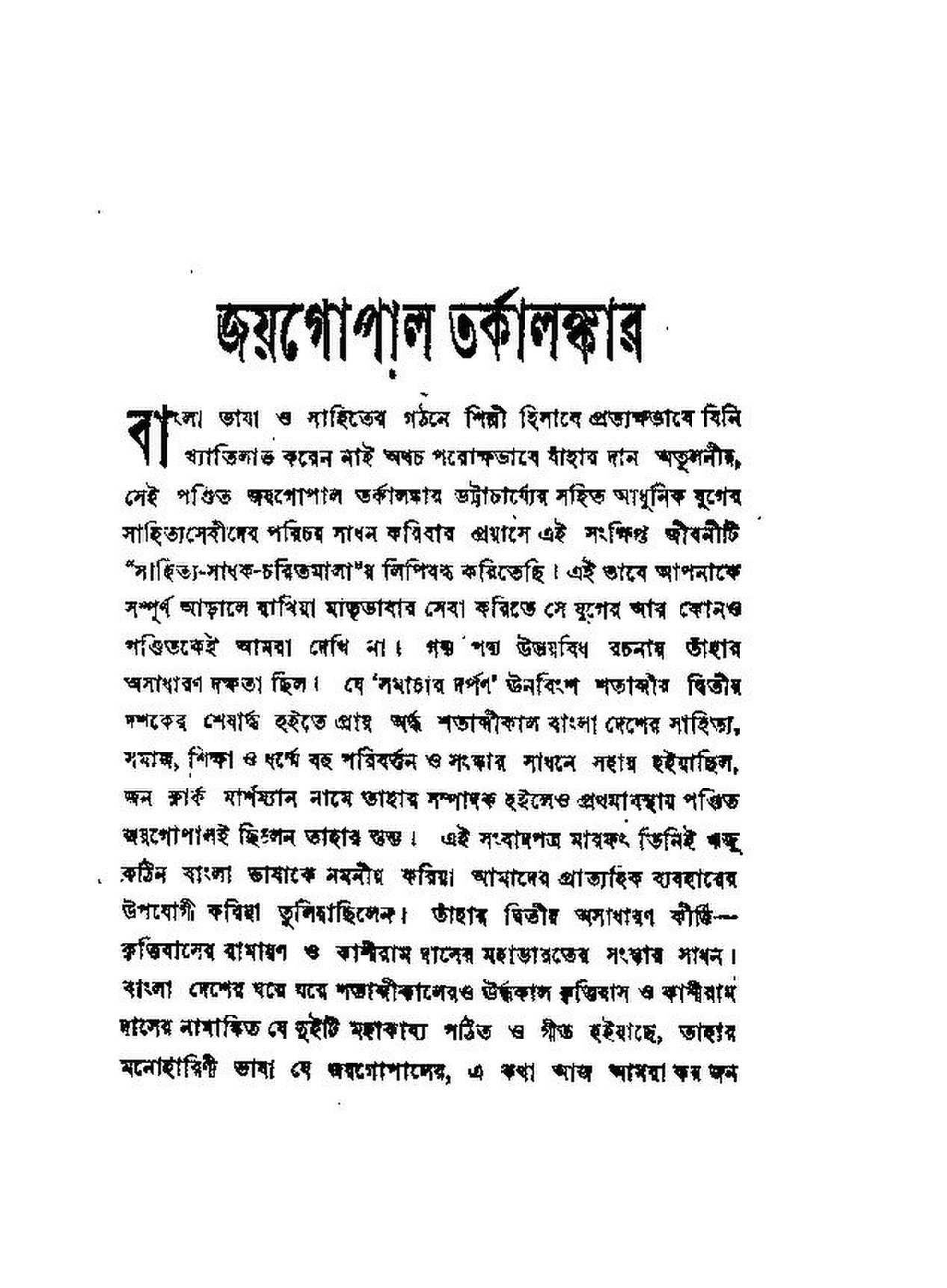
Acknowledgments on the memory of Sri Joygopal Tarkalankar
