= Charlotte White =

American missionary (1782–1863)

Personal life
- Born: July 13, 1782
- Died: December 25, 1863 (aged 81)
- Spouse: Joshua Rowe

Religious life
- Religion: Christianity
- Church: American Baptist Foreign Mission Society

Charlotte White (July 13, 1782 – December 25, 1863), also known as Charlotte Atlee and Charlotte Rowe, was the first American woman appointed as a missionary and sent to a foreign country. She was sponsored by the Baptist Board of Foreign Missions and arrived in British India in 1816. She married Joshua Rowe, an English missionary, and had three children while in India. The couple oversaw the management of several schools and a Hindi-speaking church. After Rowe's death in 1823, White continued her work without any financial assistance from missionary societies. She left India in 1826 for England and in 1829 returned to the United States where she worked as an educator.

== Early life ==
Charlotte "Susanna" Hazen Atlee was born in 1782 in Lancaster, Pennsylvania, the daughter of Judge William Augustus Atlee and Esther Bowes Sayre. Orphaned at age eleven, Charlotte Atlee was raised by her older sister, Elizabeth, in Massachusetts. She married Nathaniel Hazen White in 1803. He died in 1804 and the couple's one child died in 1805. White joined the First Baptist Church in Haverhill, Massachusetts, in 1807.

== Missionary to India ==
In 1815, Charlotte White applied to become a missionary in Burma with the newly founded American Baptist Board for Foreign Missions. Her application was controversial as many members of the Board believed that only ordained males should be appointed missionaries. Wives of male missionaries were not appointed as missionaries. The Board told her it had no money to send her to Burma. She said that she would be sustained by her own resources. After a poll by the Board members, White was accepted as a missionary in a restricted appointment as a helper and companion for the wife of George Henry Hough, a missionary printer. On December 15, 1815, she departed the U.S. by ship to Calcutta, India. One year later the Board decided that no more single female missionaries would be appointed.

On arrival in Calcutta in 1816, White remained only two months with the Houghs, marrying a widower with three sons, Joshua Rowe (1781-1823), a missionary with the English Baptist Missionary Society (BMS). White, now Mrs. Rowe, requested to become a missionary with the BMS, but was turned down. She accompanied her husband to Digah near Patna, India. In Digah, Mr. and Mrs. Rowe managed 10 schools and a Hindi-speaking church. Charlotte wrote a Hindustani language spelling book for children. In December 1821, The Reformer published an anonymous letter claiming that the prominent missionaries called the Serampore Trio (William Carey, William Ward, and Joshua Marshman) were expropriating property belonging to the Baptist Missionary Society for their own profit. In April 1823, The Reformer revealed Charlotte Rowe to be the author of the letter. The "Serampore Schism" between the BMS and the Serampore missionaries lasted more than a decade.

Joshua and Charlotte Rowe had three children. Joshua Rowe died in 1823. Charlotte remained in Digah for three more years supervising the schools and church, receiving no salary or financial assistance from any missionary organization. Short of funds, in 1826 she left India for England with her three children. Rowe's three sons from a previous marriage remained in India. She again petitioned the British BMS to appoint her as a missionary so she could return to India with financial assistance. She was turned down, although provided money to return to the United States. In 1829 she returned to the U.S. with her children, twins Charlotte (1818-1852) and Esther (1818-1851) and son Judson (1823-?).

== Later life ==
In the United States, Charlotte Rowe founded a girls school in Philadelphia and wrote articles with the pseudonym of "Honesta" for a newspaper. In the 1830s, she taught English, music, and drawing in a girls' school in Lowndesboro, Alabama. By 1850 she had moved back to her birthplace of Lancaster where she worked as Principal of Strasburg Female Seminary. She died December 25, 1863, in Philadelphia. She was buried in the family plot in Lancaster. As of 2021, her grave was unmarked.

In 2021, Reid S. Trulson published the first and only biography of White entitled, Charlotte Atlee White Rowe: The Story of America's First Appointed Woman Missionary.

== Relevant literature ==
- Trulson, Reid S. 2025. Charlotte Rowe's Journal: A Woman’s Missionary Career in British India, 1815-1822. Macon, GA: Mercer University Press.
