= John Clark Marshman =

English journalist and historian (1794–1877)

John Clark Marshman CSI
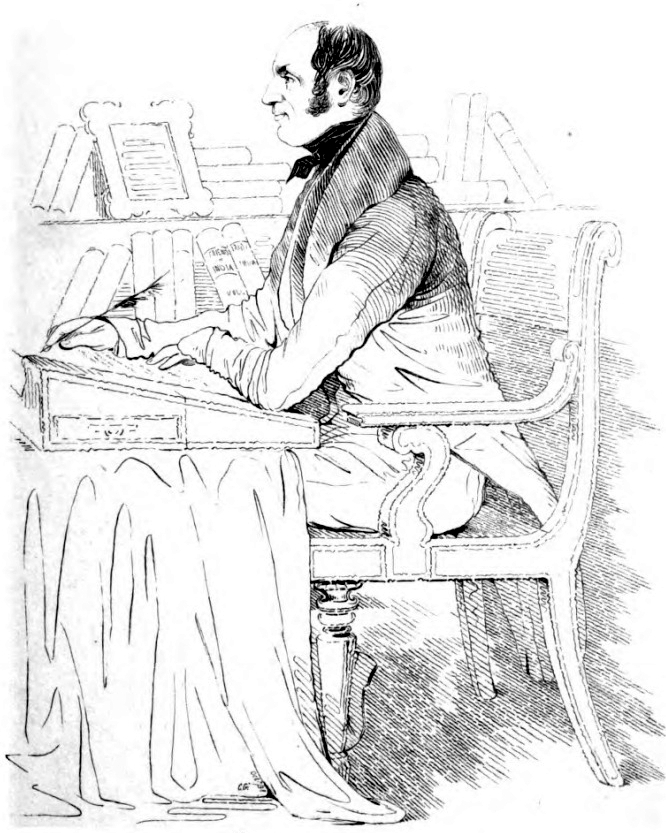
- Portrait by Colesworthey Grant (1859)
- Born: 18 August 1794; Bristol, England
- Died: 8 July 1877 (aged 82); London, England
- Occupations: Journalist, historian
- Parent(s): Joshua Marshman (father); Hannah Marshman (mother)

John Clark Marshman (18 August 1794 – 8 July 1877) was an English journalist and historian. He was editor and publisher of the Calcutta-based Friend of India, and was involved with several other Indian publications.

== Early life ==
Marshman was the first child of Joshua Marshman and Hannah Marshman and was born on 18 August 1794 at Bristol, England where his father was at that time a schoolmaster, before later emigrating to India as a missionary.

== Move to India ==
At the age of 5, Marshman travelled with his parents and William Ward on an American ship called the Criterion to Bengal, arriving in Serampore on Sunday morning, 13 October 1799.

In May 1800, his parents opened two boarding schools in Serampore; these became the most popular in the area and Marshman received his education from his parents. He was part of the growing mission family, eating at the communal table and joining with other children in Mission life; as a result he became a fluent Bengali speaker.

== Achievements ==
In April 1818, Marshman, together with his father Joshua, launched the first monthly magazine in Bengali, Digdarshan, which focused on educative information for the youth, and very shortly thereafter the weekly news magazine Samachar Darpan which was one of the two first Bengali newspapers (the other being Bengal Gazetti, published by Ganga Kishore Bhattacharya, in the first half of 1818). Subsequently, the Serampore Mission also launched the weekly Friend of India in 1821, which became so popular that Serampore was synonymous with Friend of India in European minds for much of the 19th century. The printing operations were so successful that they acquired their own substantial buildings by the river just north of the Mission Chapel.

In 1875, Friend of India amalgamated with another paper The Englishman, becoming The Statesman which remains one of India's leading English-language dailies.

Marshman also started a new paper mill at the Mission to manufacture a special new type of paper that had been devised by the missionaries to resist the virulent ravages of the local white ants. This became known as Serampore Paper and was used throughout the province.

In 1820, a steam engine was imported from Messrs. Thwaites and Rothwell, of Bolton, Lancashire, for the paper mill and was the first ever seen in India. Marshman's father Joshua was mesmerised by it and watched closely as the engineer prepared it for use.

Marshman joined the staff of Serampore College, which had been jointly founded by his father, in 1821.

In 1837, the last of the Serampore Trio, his father Joshua Marshman died. Following his death John Mack and Marshman struggled to carry on the work of the college, spending all their earnings and Marshman's income from his private concerns, including those from the paper mill. After he published The Friend of India, he stipulated that the proceeds should go to the college. It was reckoned that in all he contributed more than £30,000.

As the struggle to maintain the college was getting more onerous each year to try and fund privately, Mack and Marshman decided to turn the college over to the Baptist Missionary Society. The Society was unwilling to take over the burden fully, but did offer to support a theological professor on the college staff.

Marshman later rather unwillingly accepted the position of Official Bengali Translator to the Government, and thereafter was abused almost daily in the native newspapers as "the hireling of the Government". His salary of £1,000 per annum was passed to the college.

== Return to England ==
In 1855, Marshman planned to leave India for good. Mack and he proposed once again to pass control of the college to the Baptist Missionary Society; this time the proposal was accepted. He resigned his post as Official Bengali Translator to the Government and returned to England to Kensington Palace Gardens.

Marshman was a student of Indian history and he wrote what was for many years the only history of Bengal. He was also long engaged on the writing of the history of India; his reading was very wide and he was a distinguished Oriental scholar. He studied Chinese (like his father) and knew the major Sanskrit poems. He also gave much attention to Persian.

In England, however, he was refused a seat on the Council of India. For his services to education, he was recognised by the granting of the Star of India in 1868. To earn a living he became chairman of the Committee of Audit of the East Indian Railway. He made three unsuccessful attempts to obtain a seat in Parliament, for Ipswich in 1857, Harwich in 1859, and Harwich in 1861.

On his death it is said that he had known as much about Indian affairs as if he had been the personal assistant to four successive Viceroys. He died at Radcliffe Square, North Kensington, on 8 July 1877 and is buried in Brompton Cemetery.

== Works ==
- An abridged version of Carey's Dictionary of the Bengali Language, pub. 1827.
- Marshman, John Clark (1832). Guide Book For Moonsiffs, Sudder Ameens And Principal Sudder Ameens Containing All The Rules Necessary For The Conduct Of Suits In Their Courts Extracted From The Regulations Of Government, And Methodically Arranged. Serampore Press.
- Guide to Revenue Regulations of the Presidencies of Bengal and Agra, pub. 1835
- The History of India from remote Antiquity to the Accession of the Mogul Dynasty, pub. 1842
- Marshman, John Clark (1848). Guide to the Civil Law of the Presidency of Fort William (2 ed.). Serampore Press.
- Marshman, John Clark (1853). How Wars Arise in India: Observations on Mr. Cobden's Pamphlet, entitled, "The Origin of the Burmese War". London: Wm. H. Allen & Co.
- Marshman, John Clark (1859). The Life and Times of Carey, Marshman and Ward. Vol. I. London: Longman, Brown, Green, Longmans, & Roberts.
- Marshman, John Clark (1859). The Life and Times of Carey, Marshman and Ward. Vol. II. London: Longman, Brown, Green, Longmans, & Roberts.
- Marshman, John Clark (1860). Memoirs of Major-General Sir Henry Havelock, K.C.B. London: Longman, Green, Longman, and Roberts.
- Marshman, John Clark (1869). The History of India from the Earliest Period to the Close of Lord Dalhousie's Administration. Vol. I. London: Longmans, Green, Reader & Dyer. A transcription is available online.
- Marshman, John Clark (1869). The History of India from the Earliest Period to the Close of Lord Dalhousie's Administration. Vol. II. London: Longmans, Green, Reader & Dyer. A transcription is available online.
- Marshman, John Clark (1869). The History of India from the Earliest Period to the Close of Lord Dalhousie's Administration. Vol. III. London: Longmans, Green, Reader & Dyer. A transcription is available online.
- Marshman, John Clark (1862). "Notes on the Production of Tea in Assam, and in India Generally". The Journal of the Royal Asiatic Society of Great Britain and Ireland. 19: 315–320. doi:10.1017/S0035869X0015659X. JSTOR 25228722.
- Marshman, John Clark (1862). "Notes on the Cultivation of Cotton in the District of Dharwar; Past, Present, and Future". The Journal of the Royal Asiatic Society of Great Britain and Ireland. 19: 351–360. doi:10.1017/S0035869X00156631. JSTOR 25228726.
- Marshman, John Clark (1863). "On the Cost and Construction of the Railways in India". The Journal of the Royal Asiatic Society of Great Britain and Ireland. 20: 397–405. doi:10.1017/S0035869X00165360. JSTOR 25581258.

== Honours ==
- Companion of the Order of the Star of India (1868).

== Bibliography ==
- "Marshman, John Clark". Dictionary of National Biography. London: Smith, Elder & Co. 1885–1900.
- Sunil Kumar Chatterjee (2001). John Clark Marshman: (a trustworthy friend of India). Mahamaya Sahitya Mandir. OCLC 51228078.

== See also ==
- Arthur AJ Marshman
