= John Leechman =

Baptist missionary

John Leechman (2 September 1803 – 16 March 1874) was a Baptist missionary and educator who worked in India at Serampore. He taught logic (rhetoric), ethics and metaphysics at the Serampore College.

Leechman was born in Glasgow and went to Bristol Baptist Academy (1825-29) under William Ward and then Glasgow University where he studied philosophy under Robert Buchanan and James Mylne. He received an MA in 1832 and was commissioned to the Serampore Mission by Christopher Anderson. He joined the Baptist mission and was posted to Serampore College in India. In 1833 he married Mary, daughter of Rev. George Barclay of Kilwinning. After the death of William Carey, he became a co-pastor with John Mack and Joshua Marshman. He taught logic at the Serampore college and wrote a treatise on the 'Science and Art of Reasoning'. In 1837 he returned home due to his wife's poor health. He succeeded his father-in-law George Barclay as pastor at Irvine (Ayrshire) from 1839, serving later at Hammersmith (London) and Bath. He received an LLD from Glasgow in 1859.

The Leechmans on return to Britain were involved in resolving conflicts between the Serampore mission and the home committee.

Leechman's textbook of Logic included a history from Aristotle to J.S. Mill with critiques of John Locke and Isaac Watts. He also wrote about temperance in The Abstinence Principle (1842) and argued for scriptural guidance against drunkenness.
