= Felix Carey =

Medical missionary and linguist (1786–1822)

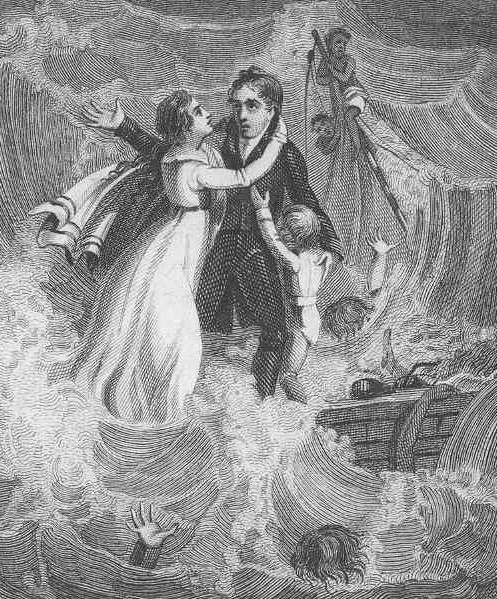
- A depiction of Felix Carey during the shipwreck in which he lost his wife and children
- Born: 20 October 1786
- Died: 10 November 1822 (aged 36); Serampore
- Occupation: Missionary, translator
- Parent(s): William Carey

Felix Carey (20 October 1786 – 10 December 1822) was a Baptist missionary, the eldest son of William Carey. He was involved in running the printing press of the Serampore Mission that his father had helped establish in India and used his linguistic skills in translating several works into the Bengali language including an attempted encyclopaedia on science. He also took an interest in the Burmese languages, Sanskrit and Pali grammar.

== Life and work ==
Carey was born in Moulton, Northamptonshire. His mother Dorothy Plackett (d. 1807) suffered from mental health problems and Carey was sent to India where he was taken care of by William Ward and baptized alongside Krishna Pal the first Hindu to be converted by the Serampore mission. He became skilled in printing and helped run the Serampore Press. He helped run the Sunday School from 1803 and also learned Sanskrit and Bengali. In 1808 he was sent by the Serampore Mission to Burma to replace Rev. Richard Mardon. Carey had received some medical training in Calcutta and he introduced smallpox vaccination in Rangoon in 1811. The King Bodawpaya of Ava ordered him to vaccinate the royal household. In 1812 many missionaries other than those from Serampore were expelled by the King of Ava. He visited India and returned to Burma in 1815 with the hope of starting a press in Rangoon. Carey's first wife Margaret died during childbirth and he married again in 1811. While travelling from Rangoon to Ava in 1814, his wife (née Blackwell) and two children were drowned in a shipwreck during the end of August in the Irrawady River and the printing press was lost. Carey was made Royal physician (and titled as Raja Sippey) and also acted as an interpreter to the King but got caught up in the political troubles between British India and the Burmese Kingdom. The loss of his family and his precarious situation led him to drink and he went into debt. He also lost his ambassadorial privileges and the support of the Burmese king leading to his move to India. In 1818 William Ward suggested that he moved back to Serampore to become an assistant to his father. He married Amelia Pope on 2 November 1821 and a daughter was born just three weeks before his death from cholera.

Carey worked on the printing of a number of books produced by the Serampore Press. Towards the end of his life he was working on Burmese grammar, a Burmese New Testament, a book on Pali and Sanskrit grammar. He wrote A Grammar of the Burman Language (1814) and produced a science periodical called Digdarshan (1818). He began to work on a Bengali encyclopedia, Vidyaharabali, translated from the fifth edition of Encyclopædia Britannica and produced in parts. The first part, Vyabachchedvidya, had 638 pages including a glossary and was published from 1819 to 1820. Only a second part on jurisprudence followed in 1821 . He also produced a Bengali translation of Goldsmith's history of England (Britts desiya bibaran samuccay). He also helped translate a textbook of chemistry by John Mack.

== Legacy ==
A biography of Carey, Prisoner of Hope, by Shally Hunt, was published in 2012.
