= Samachar Darpan =

First Bengali-language newspaper

Samachar Darpan সমাচার দর্পণ
- Type: Weekly newspaper
- Owner: Baptist Missionary Society
- Publisher: Baptist Missionary Society
- Editor: John Clark Marshman
- Founded: 1818
- Ceased publication: 1841
- Political alignment: none
- Language: Bengali
- Headquarters: Serampore Baptist Mission Press, Serampore, Bengal
- Circulation: c. 400 (in 1836)
- Sister newspapers: Akhbar-i-Serampore

Samachar Darpan (Bengali: সমাচার দর্পণ) was a Bengali weekly newspaper published by the Baptist Missionary Society and published on 23 May 1818 from the Baptist Mission Press at Serampore in the first half of the 19th century. It is considered to be the first Indian-language newspaper, although some historians contend that the Bengali weekly Bengal Gazetti or Vangal Gazette published by Ganga Kishore Bhattacharya had begun publication earlier.

== History ==
The success of the Bengali monthly Digdarshan encouraged the missionaries of the Baptist Missionary Society to embark on a new venture – the publication of a Bengali newspaper. The initiative was taken by Joshua Marshman and William Ward. At about the same time Harachandra Roy was also planning to start a Bengali newspaper from his own printing press at Chorebagan Street in Calcutta. But before he could bring out his publication, the missionaries published the first issue of Samachar Darpan from the Baptist Mission Press in Serampore on May 23, 1818.

The newspaper was published every Saturday and was edited by John Clark Marshman. Its price was 4 annas per copy. It contained news, both Indian and European, collected from various sources, particular from English language newspapers. It also contained brief articles on various subjects. It carried some material of educational value which made it respected and popular among the educated people. Both in typography and contents the Samachar Darpan maintained a fairly good standard. Its coverage of local news was certainly better than any other English or Indian language newspaper. By reprinting news and comments from other Bengali newspapers, the Samachar Darpan enabled its readers to have acquaintance with the different sections of the Bengali opinion.

The paper covered seven main beats: news of the government officials, government circulars, news of the European countries other than Britain, new events, birth, obituary and wedding, news of England, history of India and its scholarly books. It published useful information on the appointment of judges, collectors and so on.

From July 1829, the newspaper began to appear in both Bengali and English; the Bengali and English sections represented translation of each other. From January 1832, the Samachar Darpan began to be published twice a week – on Wednesday and Saturday. The price was raised from a rupee per month to one and a half. However, as a result of the hike in postage duty, the twice a week publication was discontinued and it again became a weekly newspaper from 8 November 1834.

In December 1841, the missionaries decided to discontinue the publication that ended with the last issue of December. The official reason stated was that John Clark Marshman who was still the editor of the newspaper couldn't find sufficient time owing to other pre-occupations. But the actual reason was that the Samachar Darpan, though very successful as a newspaper, had failed miserably in its primary objective – propagation of Christianity. Samachar Darpan had an uninterrupted career till the end of 1841, when the publication was discontinued. By 1836, the circulation had reached 400, which was much higher than any other Indian language publication.

== Editorial Board ==
John Clark Marshman, was the official editor and the editorial staff included some of the most distinguished Bengali Hindu pundits of the time. Marshman's control over the newspaper was only nominal and he had to depend much on his editorial board. Once when the pundits took an extended leave during the Puja, Marshman had to postpone the publications as well and he apologized to the subscribers for the delay.

== Government attitude ==
The Government showed a favourable attitude towards the publication, because the primary objective of the publication was the propagation of Christianity. The Government warned the missionaries that, "extra-ordinary precautions must be used not to give the natives cause for suspicion that the paper had been devised as an engine for undermining their religious opinions." The newspaper was allowed to be circulated through the post office at one-fourth of the usual charge. The general tone of the newspaper was moderate as compared to other missionary publications. It had to be so if the newspaper was to gain some patronage from the public.

The Government appreciated the usefulness of the newspaper as a medium of communication with the literate public.

== Antihinduism ==
At the beginning, the Hindus were not friendly towards the Darpan. But as time passed their attitude changed towards the paper. Reformist and liberal Hindus, generally found in the Samachar Darpan a valuable ally because of its strong support in favour of social reform and education.

But conflict arose when Ram Mohan Roy wrote a book under the title The Precept of Jesus: The Guide To Peace And Happiness where he refuted the supernaturalism of Jesus but admired his moral teachings. The missionaries not content with vindicating the excellence of their own doctrines, attacked all the Hindu shastras as unreasonable, and also abused the Hindus in very offensive terms in Darpan dated 14 July 1821. Doubts were expressed concerning Vedantic teaching about Maya; the teaching of Nyaya Shastra about God and creation; the dualism of Samkhya system; and the interpretation of sacrificial rites in the Mimamsa Shastra. An outraged Ram Mohan Roy, responded to the article in a forceful letter, only to find that his missive was completely ignored by the editor. Spurred by indignation and eager to counterbalance the Christian missionary propaganda Roy started his own Brahminical Magazine where he eventually published the letter.

== Persian edition ==
In 1826, the Government requested the missionaries to bring out a Persian edition of Samachar Darpan to provide better communication with the people of Upper India, which did not yet have any Indian-language newspaper. Accordingly, the Persian version called Akhbar-i-Serampur was published on 6 May 1826. The Government subsidized this newspaper with a monthly grant of 160 rupees. But after two years the publication was discontinued to lack of sufficient patronage.
