= Hannah Marshman =

British missionary (1767–1847)

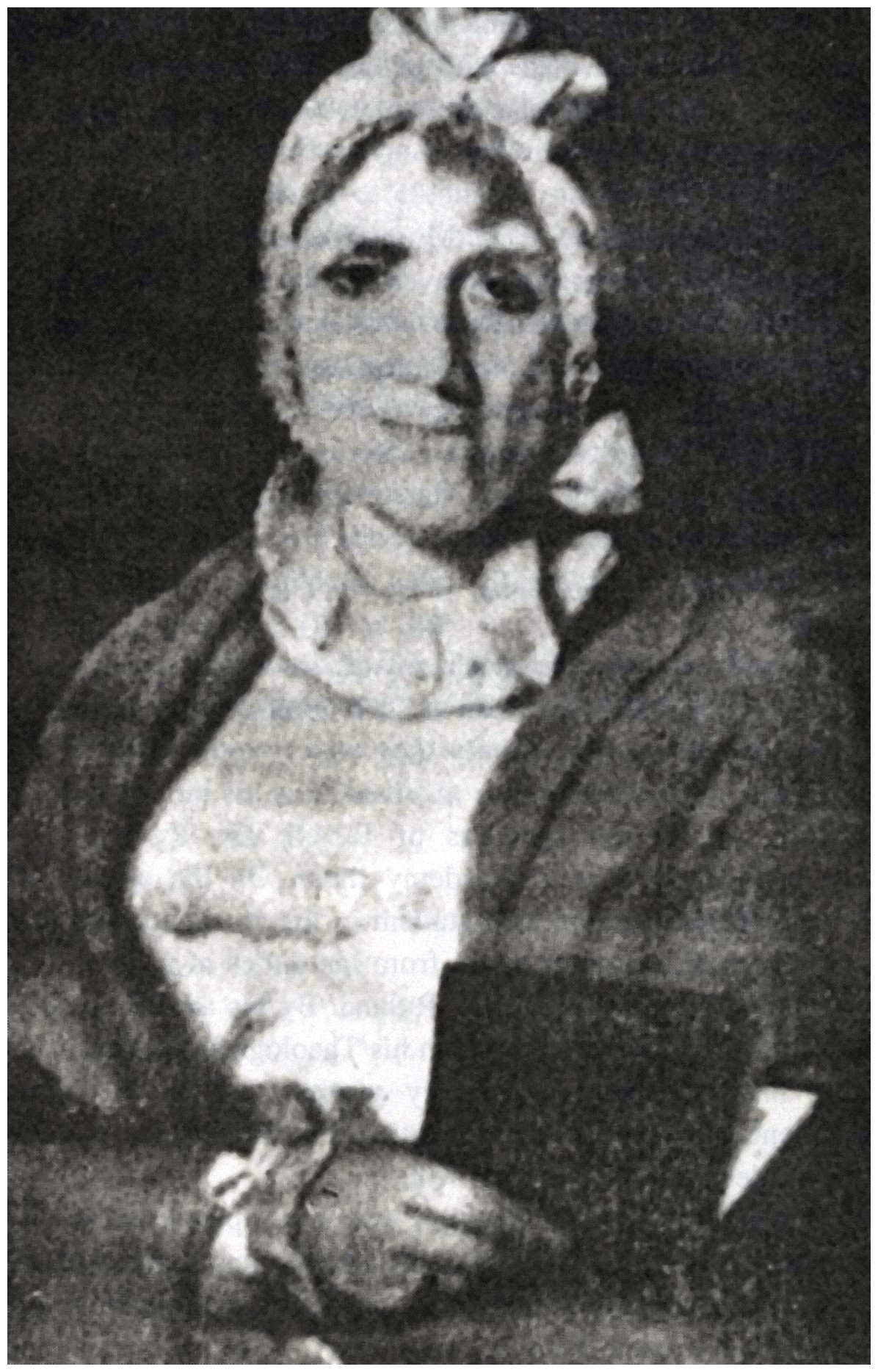
Hannah Marshman

Hannah Marshman (13 May 1767 – 5 March 1847) was an English missionary who founded a school at Serampore, India.

She was the daughter of John Shepherd, a farmer, and his wife Rachel, and the granddaughter of John Clark, pastor of the Baptist church at Crockerton, Wiltshire. Her mother died when she was eight. In 1791 Hannah Shepherd married Joshua Marshman. In 1794, the couple moved from Westbury Leigh in Wiltshire to Bristol, where they joined the Broadmead Baptist Church. The couple were to eventually have 12 children; of these only five were alive when Hannah Marshman died.

Hannah Marshman is considered to be the first woman missionary in India.

== Missionary work ==
On 29 May 1799, Hannah, Joshua and their two children set out from Portsmouth for India, aboard the ship Criterion. Although there was a threat of a French naval attack, the family landed safely at the Danish settlement of Serampore (a few miles north of Calcutta) on 13 October 1799. They had chosen to land here because the East India Company was at that time hostile to missionaries. They settled in the Danish colony and were joined there by William Carey on 10 January 1800.

On 1 May 1800, Joshua and Hannah Marshman opened two boarding schools at Serampore. The schools became the most popular in the Presidency and their son John Clark Marshman received his education from his parents. He was part of the growing mission family, eating at the communal table and joining with other children in mission life. As with all other mission family members, he was encouraged to become a fluent Bengali speaker.

Meanwhile, the Missionary Society had begun sending more missionaries to India. The first to arrive was John Fountain, who arrived in Mudnabatty and began a teaching school. He was followed by William Ward, a printer; David Brunsdon, one of Marshman's students; and William Grant, who died three weeks after his arrival.

The spirit of the early community's unity was somewhat broken when new missionaries arrived who were not willing to live in the communal fashion that had developed. One missionary demanded "...a separate house, stable and servants." There were also other differences, as the new missionaries found their seniors - particularly Joshua Marshman - to be somewhat dictatorial, assigning them duties which were not to their liking.

In 1800, when she first met them, Marshman was appalled by the neglect in which William Carey and his wife looked after his four boys; aged 4, 7, 12 and 15, they were unmannered, undisciplined, and even uneducated. Carey had not spoiled, but rather simply ignored them. Marshman, her husband and their friend the printer William Ward, took the boys in tow. Together they shaped the boys as Carey pampered his botanical specimens, performed his many missionary tasks and journeyed into Calcutta to teach at Fort William College. They offered the boys structure, instruction and companionship. To their credit – and little to Carey's – all four boys went on to useful careers.

At one point, Marshman wrote about Carey, "The good man saw and lamented the evil but was too mild to apply an effectual remedy."

== The Serampore Girls' School and Serampore College ==
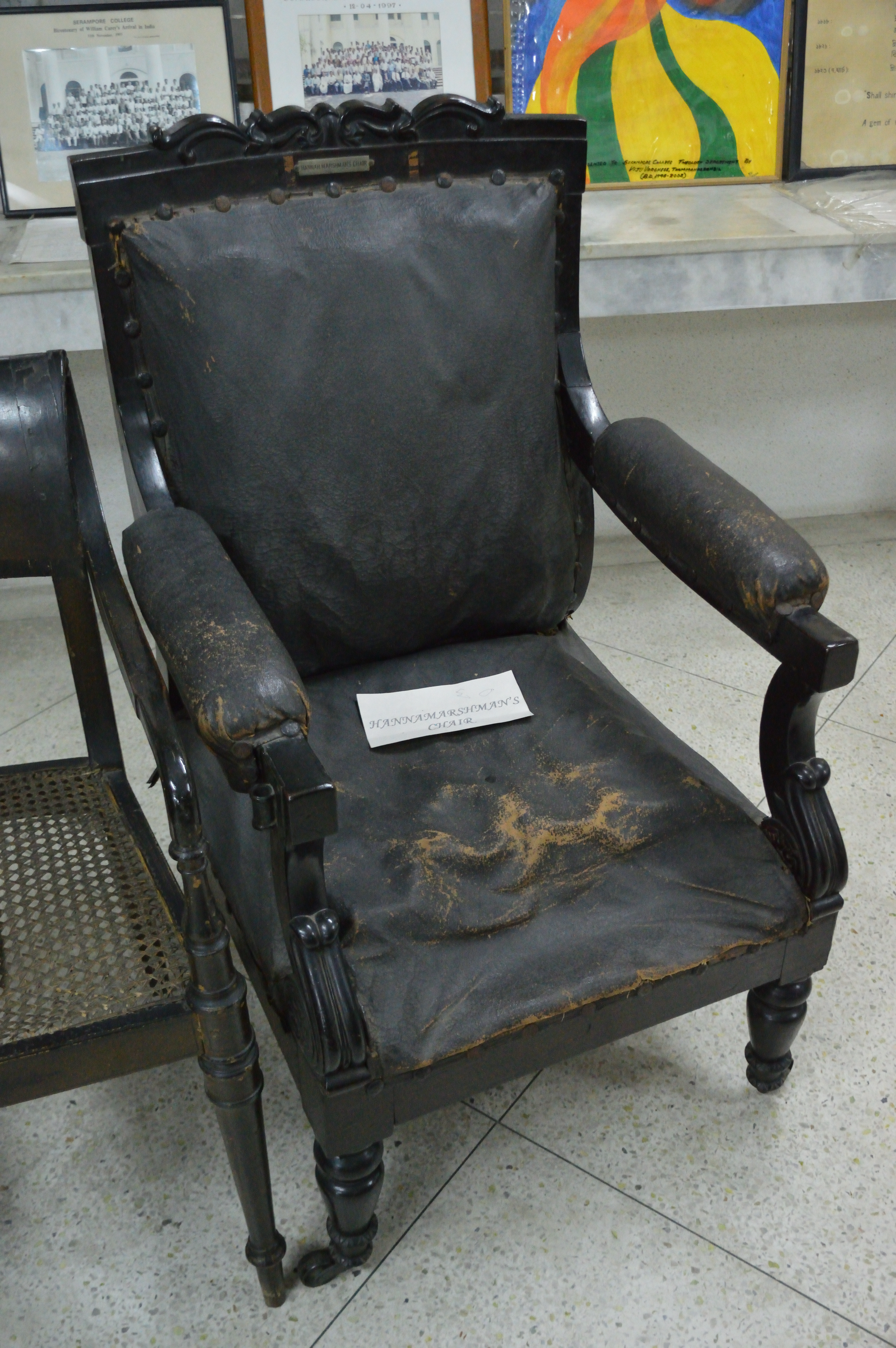
Hannah used this chair at the Serampore College.

Mrs Marshamann started a school in 1800, as well as operating two boarding schools for English children (the fees of which helped keep the Serampore mission viable).

On 5 July 1818, William Carey, Joshua Marshman and William Ward issued a prospectus (written by Marshman) for a proposed new "College for the instruction of Asiatic, Christian, and other youth in Eastern literature and European science". Thus was born Serampore College - which still continues to this day.

== Death and memorial ==
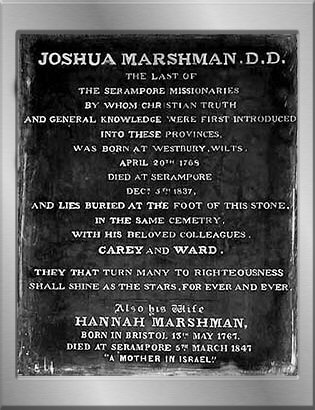

Hannah Marshman died in 1847.

The following inscription to her memory is placed in the Mission Chapel at Serampore: "In Memory of Hannah Marshman, widow of Joshua Marshman, D. D. the last surviving Member of the Mission Family at Serampore, she arrived in this settlement in October 1799, and opened a seminary to aid in the support of the Mission in May 1800, after having consecrated her life and property to the promotion of this sacred cause and exhibited an example of humble piety and energetic benevolence for forty-seven years. She died at the age of eighty, March 5, 1847."

The full text of her obituary in the Bengal Obituary can be found here.
