= Banglapedia =

National encyclopedia of Bangladesh

- National Encyclopedia of Bangladesh
- Editor: Sirajul Islam; Sajahan Miah
- Original title: বাংলাপিডিয়া
- Translator: Various
- Language: Bengali, English
- Genre: Encyclopedia
- Publisher: Banglapedia Trust, Asiatic Society of Bangladesh
- Publication date: January 2003
- Publication place: Bangladesh
- Media type: Print (hardcover), CD-ROM, Online
- ISBN: 984-32-0576-6
- OCLC: 52727562
- Original text: বাংলাপিডিয়া online
- Website: en.banglapedia.org; (English Edition): bn.banglapedia.org; (Bengali Edition)

Banglapedia: the National Encyclopedia of Bangladesh is the first Bangladeshi encyclopedia. It is available in print, CD-ROM format and online, in both Bengali and English. The print version comprises fourteen 500-page volumes. The first edition was published in January 2003 in ten volumes by the Asiatic Society of Bangladesh. with a plan to update it every two years. The second edition was issued in 2012 in fourteen volumes.

Banglapedia was not designed as a general encyclopedia but as a specialized encyclopedia on Bangladesh-related topics. For the encyclopedia's purposes, Bangladesh is defined as the territory comprising ancient Eastern India, Bengal Sultanate, Bengal Subah, Bengal Presidency, East Bengal, East Pakistan, and the independent Bangladesh, in historical succession.

The encyclopedia's chief editor is Sirajul Islam. Over 1450 writers and specialists in Bangladesh and abroad helped create the entries. Banglapedia has over 5,700 entries in six editorial categories, each of which is overseen by an expert editor, as well as over 2,000 single and four-colour illustrations and 2,100 cross-references.

The project was funded by the Government of Bangladesh, private sector organizations, academic institutes and UNESCO. Though its original budget was 800,000 taka (roughly US$10,000), the Asiatic Society eventually spent 80 million taka (roughly US$1 million) on the project. Despite controversies over entries on the Bangladesh Liberation War and indigenous people, both the Bengali and English versions became popular upon publication.

== Development ==
The Banglapedia project originated when the Asiatic Society of Bangladesh was working on a three-volume study titled History of Bangladesh, 1704-1971 in 1991. The editors felt the need for a standard desk reference, as that project progressed laboriously, culling facts from various libraries. The idea finally led to a concept paper prepared by Sirajul Islam and his colleagues and submitted to the Asiatic Society of Bangladesh in early 1994. The Banglapedia project was formally adopted on 19 February 1997, and Islam was appointed project director and chief editor. As the head of the Project Implementation Committee, his task was to plan and manage the project funding. In 1996, some three dozen committees were formed with three to four people in each committee to recommend the entries. Twenty-seven thousand entries were proposed, requiring a 20-volume compendium. Because of financial constraints, the number of entries was cut down to around 6,000. The project officially took off in 1998.

When the project began, the Society had only eight hundred thousand taka in its coffers for the project. Banglapedia raised further contributions from universities, banks, multinational companies, international organisations and even private individuals. A pool of agencies, including UNESCO, the University Grants Commission, universities, financial institutions and NGOs initially financed the project, which was completed at a cost of taka 80 million. Education Ministry funded about 74% of the cost, while 26% of the fund came mostly from universities and banks. Before direct sales started on 3 January 2003, 4,000 copies of the English version and all but 250 copies of the Bengali version were sold in advance out of the initial print of 5,000 copies for each versions. For an additional run of 10,000 prints people waited in queues outside the Asiatic Society office on the day of the release, and sales continued until 9:30 in the evening. A total of 4,500 sets of the Bengali version and 2,500 of the English version were sold on the day of release.

== History of Bengali-language encyclopedias ==
The first attempt to compile a Bengali encyclopedia was undertaken by Felix Carey, who was the son of Reverend William Carey of Serampore and the first lexicographer of the Burmese language. In 1819, he began the translation of the fifth edition of Encyclopædia Britannica, naming it Vidyarthabali. From October 1819 till November 1820 the book was printed by Felix Carey every month in 48-page installments. Thus completed, the first part of Vidyarthabali was compiled into the 638-page Vyabachchedvidya, the first book on anatomy and surgery in Bengali. Work on the second part, Smritishastra, which was largely on jurisprudence, then began. But Carey died after only two 40-page installments were printed in February and March 1821.

It was followed by Maharaja Kalikirshna Dev Bahadur's (1808–1974) Sankshipta Sadvidyabali (1833), a concise encyclopedia. Then came Raja Radhakanta Deb's Sabdakalpadrum (1822–1858), a Sanskrit encyclopedic dictionary in eight parts. Next was Rajkrishna Ray and Saratchandra Dev's joint work Bharatkosh, the first Bengali encyclopedia laid-out in alphabetical order (1880–1892) published in three volumes. Reverend Krishna Mohan Banerjee's adaptation of Encyclopædia Britannica, Vidyakalpadruma or Encyclopædia Bengalensis (1846–1851), and the 22-volume Bangla Visvakosh (1886–1911), edited by Nagendranath Basu with contributions from many major personalities of contemporary Bengal, were published next.

After the independence of Pakistan and the partition of Bengal in 1947, there have been more attempts to compile and publish an encyclopedia. The first was a project to produce a Bengali adaptation of Columbia Viking Desk Encyclopedia by Franklin Book Programs Inc., undertaken in 1959 and aborted ten years later. The unfinished papers were compiled into four unequal volumes as Bangla Vishvakosh (1972) with Khan Bahadur Abdul Hakim as the chief editor. After the independence of Bangladesh in 1971, three specialized encyclopedias were published: the multi-volume Islami Bishwakosh (Encyclopedia of Islam, 1986) by Islamic Foundation Bangladesh, five-volume Shishu-Biswakosh (Encyclopedia for Children, 1995) by Bangladesh Shishu Academy, and four-volume Vijnan Biswakosh (Encyclopedia of Science, 1998) by Bangla Academy.

== Content ==
Vidyakalpadruma: an encyclopedic work in 13 parts by Reverend Krishna Mohan Banerjee, based on various English and Sanskrit anthologies and other source books. As it was written in Bengali and English, it was named Encyclopedia Bengaliansis. Articles on history, geography, mathematics and ethics related to Asia, Europe and America are included. The first volume of the Vidyakalpadruma (1845) was Roman Rajyer Purabritta (History of the Roman Empire). The third volume was Purabritta O Itihas Sar (Historical Antiquities), and it contained tales of ancient Egyptian heroes. The fourth volume (1846) was a history of Rome and the sixth volume (1847) a history of Egypt. The eighth volume, Bhugol Brittanta (Geographical Narratives), contained the geography of Asia and Europe. Krishna Mohan hoped to write the history of India, but was unable to do so.
Sample text (excerpt) from Banglapedia: entry on Vidyakalpadruma

Banglapedia contains over 5,700 entries, which are divided into six categories: arts and humanities, history and heritage, state and governance, society and economy, natural sciences, and biological sciences. The writing of each article was overseen by an expert editor.

Banglapedia was not designed as a general encyclopedia. Its purpose is to provide a standard desk reference for Bangladeshis, as well as for people interested in Bangladesh, Bengali-speaking people, and related political, cultural and geographical contexts.

The encyclopedia's editors intended to cover the rise of the Bengal river delta on the physical plane, and its evolution to date, and the changing features of the formation of the delta's janapada or human settlements on the human plane. The latter includes the rise and fall of kingdoms, invasions from within and beyond and their implications, dynastic rules and administration, as well as other aspects of Bangladesh's past and present. Entries on topics after 1947 are restricted to the geographical region of Bangladesh. However, for biographical entries, the linguistic identity prevails.

The range of topics covered by Banglapedia includes political geography, religion, literature, art and architecture, folk practices and institutions, indigenous and colonial administration, politics, society, economy, ethnicity, and the sciences. All 64 districts of Bangladesh, as well as 451 upazilas, have been described in details ranging from topographical accounts to the number of dairy farms and hatcheries. Over 2,000 single and four-colour illustrations depict Bangladeshi art and architecture, everyday life, cities and villages and personages. It has about 2,100 cross-references, cartographic information, tables and statistics. It is laid out in alphabetical order and is prefaced by an essay by the chief editor. There is a section explaining how to use the Banglapedia, which clarifies issues such as date systems, contributors, cross references, and headings.

=== Operational definition of Bangladesh ===
According to the publisher, the goal of this reference tool is to inquire, interpret and integrate the lived experiences and achievements of the people of Bangladesh from ancient times to the present. The project, conceptually and territorially, interprets the term "Bangladesh" to mean successively ancient Eastern India, the Bengal Sultanate, Bengal Subah, Bengal Presidency, East Bengal, East Pakistan, and Bangladesh. The editor's preface states:

From ancient times to 1971, the political geography of the region has changed often, and with that its name has also undergone changes. The cognates of Vanga, Bangalah, Vangla, Bengal, Vangadesh, Vangladesh, etc. have the closest affinity both territorially and linguistically with the term Bangla. With the rise of Bangladesh as a sovereign nation state, the term has no doubt obtained a specific meaning. It may be noted here that the term Bangalah or Bengala, from which Bangla and Bengal originated, was coined and circulated by Muslim rulers whose seats of administration were located mostly within the present territory of Bangladesh.

== Working team ==
Over 1,200 writers and specialists contributed to the encyclopedia, one fifth of whom were foreign experts in Bangladesh or experts working abroad. They are mostly academics, as well as specialists in districts and upazilas for locality inputs and people from professions and occupations. District and upazila cartography has been processed at the Geographic information system (GIS) and cartographic laboratory set up for the Banglapedia. A gazetteer group was created to focus on districts and upazilas. The fact that around 400 local intellectuals were charged with writing about their respective zilas and upazilas was described as a unique approach to information gathering. In addition, 250 people worked in research management for seven years. A total of 2,000 scholars and technicians were involved. There were 270 full-time personnel on the project in all, with 35 to 40 people employed at any given time.

Sirajul Islam is the chairman of the Board of Editors of Banglapedia, and the editor of the Journal of the Asiatic Society of Bangladesh. A professor of history at the University of Dhaka, the oldest and largest university in Bangladesh, Islam gave up his day job five years before the formal date for retirement, to make time for Banglapedia. He also edited the 3 volumes of the History of Bangladesh (political, economic and socio-cultural), published by the Asiatic Society In 1991. He is now working on the Children's Banglapedia and the Cultural Survey of Bangladesh, and is also in charge of the National Online Biography project of the Society and the Banglapedia Trust.

The encyclopedia was prepared by a board of editors that included Professor Sirajul Islam of the Department of History, Dhaka University, as the chairman and chief editor, Professor Sajahan Miah of the Department of Philosophy, Dhaka University, as the convenor and managing editor, Professor M. Aminul Islam as the chairman of Project Implementation Committee, the chairman of Fund Management Committee, and the chairman of Cartography Committee, Professor Abdul Momin Chowdhury as the chairman of Publication Committee, Professor S M Mahfuzur Rahman as the convenor of Purchase and Procurement Committee, Shahida Alam as the convenor of Public Relations and Communication Committee, and Professor Jamilur Reza Chowdhury as the chairman of Multimedia Committee.

The management structure includes a total of sixty members, divided into six different sub-committees headed by six subject editors. Each sub-committee covered a particular discipline. There were six consulting editors, four language editors, and three translation editors. Each subject editor received assistance from six assistant and associate editors. Banglapedias subject editors were: Professor Abdul Momin Chowdhury (History and Heritage), Professor Wakil Ahmed (Arts, Humanities, Religion), Professor Mahfuzur Rahman (Society and Economy), Dr Kamal Siddiqui (State and Governance), and Professor S M H Kabir (Science and Technology).

== Electronic versions ==
The CD-ROM version of Banglapedia has more entries than the print version, along with 65 video clips, 49 audio clips, 2,714 images and thumbnails, and 647 maps. The audio clips include songs by Rabindranath Tagore and Kazi Nazrul Islam, while the video clips include Sheikh Mujibur Rahman's speech on 7 March 1971. Some images that appear in black and white in the print version are in color in the CD-ROM version. Designed to run on Windows 98, Windows ME, Windows 2000 and Windows NT, the CD-ROM version includes about 70,000 links and an option to create a personal "favorite list".

Banglapedia has had several online addresses, some are no longer authorised by the Asiatic Society of Bangladesh.

== Controversy ==
Controversy over Banglapedia broke out even before publication, when the Inqilab group, a major Bangladeshi newspaper publishing house, got hold of a few entries on religion and related issues. There have also been complaints about an omission of Jamaat-e-Islami's activities during the Bangladesh Liberation War. A study by Bdnews24.com, a news portal, claimed that Banglapedia is biased and inaccurate about Bangladesh's indigenous population. The encyclopedia is also reported to have used derogatory coinage such as Mogh for Marma and Rakhine, Tipra for Tripuri and Murang for Mros, as well as upajati (literally "sub-nation", used to mean "tribal") to define them all. Leaders of the indigenous community, including Chittagong Hill Tracts Regional Council member and Parbattya Chattagram Jana Sanghati Samiti leader Rupayan Dewan and general secretary of Adivasi Forum Sanjib Drong, have endorsed the study's findings. Chief editor Islam acknowledged the complaint and promised to amend the second edition accordingly.

== See also ==
- Bengali Wikipedia
- List of online encyclopedias
- List of historical encyclopedias
