= Serampore Mission Press =

Publisher in Danish India

The Serampore Mission Press was a book and newspaper publisher that operated in Serampore, Danish India, from 1800 to 1837.

The Press was founded by the British Baptist missionaries William Carey, William Ward, and Joshua Marshman, collectively known as the Serampore Trio, at the Serampore Mission. It began operations on 10 January 1800. The British government, highly suspicious of missionaries, discouraged missionary work in their Indian territories. However, since Serampore was under Danish rule, the missionaries and the Press were able to operate freely.

The press produced 212,000 books between 1800 and 1832. In August 1800, the press published a Bengali translation of the Gospel according to St Matthew. The press published religious Christian tracts, Indian literary works, translations of the Bible in twenty five Indian vernaculars and other South Asian languages. However, its major activity was the publication of vernacular textbooks. The Press printed books on grammar, dictionaries, history, legends and moral tales for the Fort William College and the Calcutta School-Book Society. In 1818, the Press also published the first Bengali newspaper and magazine. It published books in almost forty five languages.

The press closed in 1837 when the Mission ran into heavy debts. According to essayist Nikhil Sarkar in "Printing and the Spirit of Calcutta", the Press merged with the Baptist Mission Press.

Gangakishore Bhattacharya, considered the first Bengali printer, began his career as a compositor at the press.

The press had an impact on the development of the Bengali language. However, despite producing early literature in Gurmukhi Punjabi, it had a lesser impact on Punjabi, perhaps owing to an 1812 fire that made its Punjabi publications less accessible to missionaries and locals. In Punjab, the later Ludhiana Mission Press was more successful.

== History ==
Early presses began as purely functional sites for missionaries and East India Company administrators. The earliest Bengali type is found in the bookseller Andrew of Hooghly’s publication A Grammar of the Bengal Language.

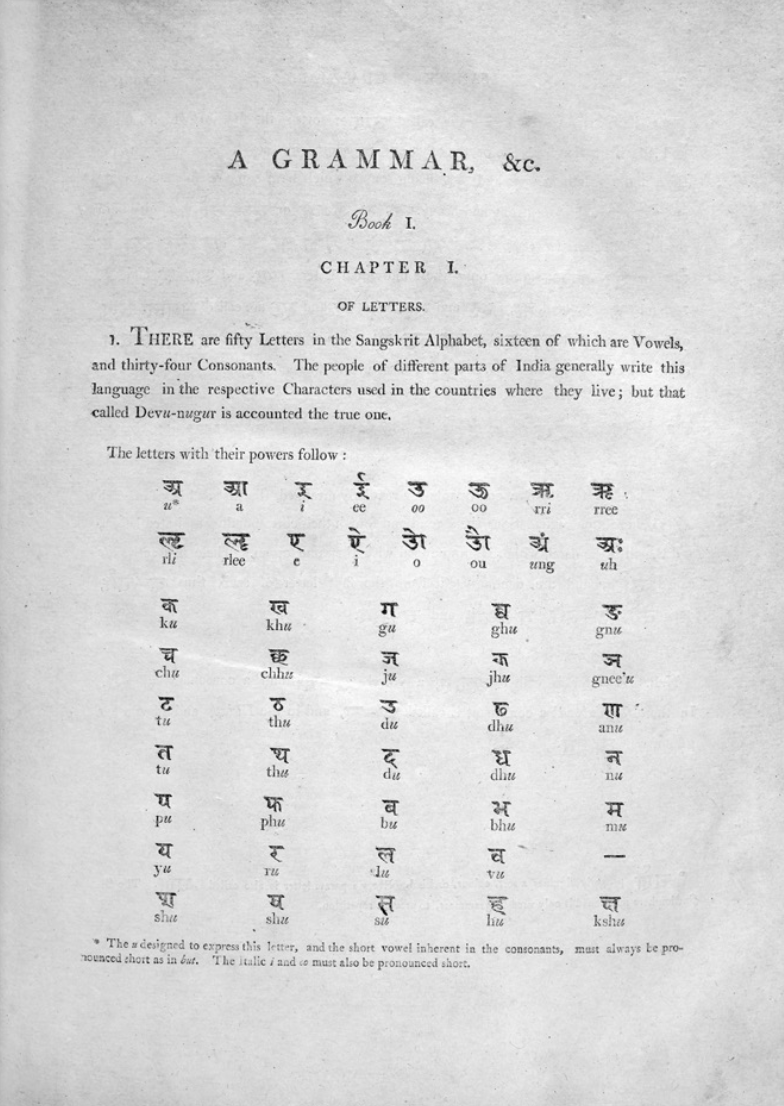
William Carey, A Grammar of the Sungskrit Language, 1806. William Ward, printer. Reproduced by kind permission of the Syndics of Cambridge University Library.

Written by English philologist Nathaniel Halhed, the type was set by a local engraver, Panchanan Karmakar, and supervised by Sir Charles Wilkins. Published in 1778, the book was largely in English and featured few Bengali excerpts. The creation of a Bengali typeset, though limited, set in motion the development of the Serampore Mission Press.

William Carey arrived in Calcutta on 11 November 1793. His early attempts to set up a mission on the soil of British India failed, as the company was hostile towards missionary activity. Eventually, Carey was permitted to set up his mission in Danish-controlled Serampore—then known as Fredericksnagar—where he was joined by two other Baptists, William Ward and Joshua Marshman. Carey first bought a second-hand English press for forty pounds, sourced from an advertisement. He later had acquired a wooden hand press, gifted by George Udny, the indigo planter who had supported Carey and his family. He wanted to print the New Testament in Bengali and therefore purchased ink, paper and Bengali fonts from the type cutting foundry of Panchanan Karmakar in Calcutta. Panchanan Karmakar, the goldsmith trained in type making by Wilkins, was ‘borrowed’ by Carey from Colebrooke and then put under virtual house arrest in Serampore. With the help of Panchanan and his son-in-law Manohar, a type foundry was set up in March 1800. In the first ten years of its life, the foundry produced type in at least thirteen languages. The press was set up in Mudnabatty where Carey had settled, but he could not begin the printing because he did not have an expert printer.

The then Governor-General of India, Lord Wellesley, did not object to any printing presses being set up outside British occupied land but was strictly against any in English territory. Rev. Mr. Brown was informed that Lord Wellesley would enforce censorship on any publication done on English territory outside Calcutta. The British government threatened to arrest missionaries who would trespass on the East India Company’s territory. The Danish Government of Serampore assured Ward that they would provide protection for the missionaries. In 1798 Carey suggested that the missionaries could establish the Mission's headquarters in Serampore.

In 1799 William Ward and Joshua Marshman came to Calcutta. In the face of rigid resistance from the company, Ward and Carey decided to establish the Mission and printing press in Serampore. Carey's press and other printing paraphernalia were transported to Serampore. Ward was a printer and therefore work on the printing of the Bengali Bible was immediately started in March 1800. Ward also doubled up as the type setter during the early days. In spite of the high rents in Serampore, the missionaries were able to purchase a suitable premise.

The printing press was in the immediate charge of Ward, who left detailed accounts of its day-to-day running. Between 1800 and 1834, the press printed Bible translations in almost 50 languages, 38 of which were translated at Serampore by Carey and his associates. There were altogether 117 printings, of which 25 were in Bengali. The press supplied Bibles to almost all significant Baptist missions in the region, from Indonesia in the east to Afghanistan in the west. From a memoir of 1813, it may be seen that a Malay Bible in roman characters was in preparation, while a five-volume reprint of the entire Bible in Arabic was being undertaken for the lieutenant-governor of Java. The memoir of 1816 claims that a Chinese Pentateuch was in the press and that ‘the new moveable metal type, after many experiments, are a complete success’. The 1820 memoir records the printing of the New Testament in Pushtoo, and also the setting up of a paper factory.

To appease Lord Wellesley, Rev. Brown had to assure him of the purely evangelical intentions of the press since they had refused to publish a pamphlet that criticized the English government. Rev. Brown also convinced Wellesley that the Bengali Bible published by the press would be useful for the students of the about to be opened Fort William College. Thus began a fruitful and long association between the Serampore Press and the Fort William College.

William Carey was appointed as the professor of Sanskrit in the college and after that he published a number of books in Bengali from the press.

== Infrastructure ==
The press initially started work with some fonts that Carey had purchased from Punchanon. In 1803 Carey decided to publish a Sanskrit grammar, A Grammar of the Sungskrit Language (1804, 1806, 1808) in Dev Nagree type which required 700 separate punches. Carey therefore employed Punchanon and then an assistant Monohar. The two later established a type foundry in Serampore. Monohar created beautiful scripts of Bengali, Nagree, Persian and Arabic. Types were designed and cut for all the languages in which books were published. In fact, movable metal types for Chinese were also developed which were more economical than the traditional wooden block types.

In 1809 a treadmill that was run by a steam engine was set up in Serampore to produce paper.

Translation often began with the New Testament, in order to more easily translate other works to the same language and to create more accurate passage of the Old Testament and supplementary passages. received partial translations, out of order. Translations relied on the available print types. Because of the length of the typesetting processes, presses often could not immediately full translations. Once an initial draft was sent, translators would immediately begin working on a second edition, without waiting for a first proof from printers. This asynchronous workflow meant that translations were often corrected in the middle of a print run, and copies of a book from the edition could be found to have distinct changes.

The printing process in Serampore foundries was an elaborate endeavor: it involved collaboration by engravers, printers, inkers, and translators. Individual blocks were prepared in what was known as the akhand system, literally translated to “whole” or “unfragmented”. This system paralleled the European tradition of kerning, an adjustment process to correct the spacing between letters. Sanskrit, like many languages indigenous to India, features a range of diacritical marks. These initially each demanded a kerning, or adjustment process, and were sorted into kerning pairs. However, the development of the akhand system allowed these marks to be cast independently of their corresponding vowels and consonants. By separating diacritical marks from the body of the letter, this allowed type-blocks to be cast more quickly, but it increased the compositional time before printing. This method also reflected long-standing tradition of block printing on cloth; the advent of the press both drew on and influenced this artistic practice.

== Printing and publishing ==
The first published work of the Serampore Mission Press was the Bengali New Testament. On 18 March 1800, the first proof sheets of the translation were printed. In August, the gospel of Matthew was completed and published as the Mangal Samachar. Five hundred copies of Carey’s translations were initially planned for printing in the Devanagari script in a 125-page demi-sheet booklet. However, the press printed only 465 copies after learning that the Maharashtrian population could not read the script. While Brahmin priests used the Balbodh script for writing — a script to be “understood by children” — local communication was done in the Modi script, which was better suited for record-keeping . The first Modi punches were made in 1805. One thousand editions of a Modi script New Testament were published six years later. However, when this edition was circulation to the American Board of Commissioners for Foreign Missions (ABCFM) in Bombay, led by Gordon Hall and Samuel Newell, Carey found that the script was again illegible to the region’s resident’s because translators had used a Marathi dialect local to Nagpur.

The bulk of publication consisted of Bibles, but even more significant than the Bibles were the Bengali translations of the two great epics Ramayana and Mahabharata. These were published during 1802–3, and marked the first ever appearance of the epics in printed form, in any language. The press also published dictionaries, grammars, dialogues or colloquies, Sanskrit phrasebooks, philosophy, Hindu mythological tales, tracts, and the first ever newspaper in Bengali, the Samachar Durpun or the "Mirror of News". The first number of this biweekly, bilingual (Bengali and English) paper was published in May 1818. According to a calculation made by the missionaries themselves, a total of 212,000 items of print in 40 languages were issued by the press from 1800 to 1832. Along with the mission's own publications, the press also executed orders by Fort William College. During the first two decades of the nineteenth century, the college played a crucial role in producing grammars and lexicons in all the major Indian languages, a task carried out both by Indian and European scholars. Altogether 38 such works were produced in Arabic, Persian, Sanskrit, Urdu, Braj, Bengali, Marathi, Oriya, Panjabi, Telugu and Kannada. The last sheets of the work were published on 7 February 1801. The printing of the volume was completed within nine months.

=== Translations of the Bible ===
At the beginning of 1804, the missionaries decided to publish translations of the Bible in Bengali, Hindoostanee, Mahratta, Telinga, Kurnata, Ooriya and Tamul. Between 1800 and 1834, the press printed Bible translations in almost 50 languages, 38 of which were translated at Serampore by Carey and his associates. There were altogether 117 printings, of which 25 were in Bengali. By 1804 the Bible had been printed in Bengalee, Ooriya, Hindoostanee and Sanskrit. A type font for the Burman language was being developed. Translations in Telinga, Kurnata, Mahratta, Punjabi (in Gurmukhi) and Persian were at various stages. In 1811 the translation of the New Testament in Cashmere was started. By 1818, the Assamese New Testament had been printed. By March 1816, the printing of St. Mathew was finished or nearly so in Kunkuna, Mooltanee, Sindhee, Bikaneer, Nepalese, Ooduypore, Marwar, Juypore, Khasee and Burman. By 1817 the entire Bible had been printed in Armenian. The New Testament in Pushtoo or Affghan and Gujuratee was completed by 1820. By 1821, the New Testament had been printed in Bhugulkhund and Kanoje. In 1826 the Magadh, Oojuyeenee, Jumboo and Bhutneer New Testament were printed. By this time the Bruj, Sreenugur, Palpa and Munipore New Testaments had also been printed. The New Testament was also printed in Bagheli, Bhatneri, Bhotan, Dogri, Garhwali, Javanese, Kumauni, Lahnda, Magahi, Malay, Malvi, Mewari, Siamese and Singhalese.

Mr. Buchanan, the vice-provost of the Serampore College suggested Carey that he should take up the translation of the Bible to Chinese after learning the language from Mr. Lasser. Carey appointed Mr. Marshman to this task and he was engaged in the Chinese translation for fourteen years. In April 1822 the printing of the Chinese Bible was completed using moveable metallic types.

The translations were subject to heavy criticisms from the very beginning. Various societies including the Baptist Society and Bible Society questioned the accuracy of the translations. The missionaries themselves accepted that their work was flawed and whole-heartedly accepted constructive criticism while renouncing detractors.

=== Vernacular publications ===
Throughout the 19^{th} century, the Bengali language underwent a fundamental reworking. The primarily oral language was remodeled as it was used to record British administrative activity, transforming both the mode and style of communication. At the same time, its usage by a newly emergent class of urban literati further clarified and standardized written Bengali conventions. Schools set up alongside missionary and press activity developed a generation of indigenous, Western-educated pupils whose multicultural social references uniquely impacted vernacular communication.

Ramarama Boshoo (also known as Ram Ram Boshoo or Rama Basu) under the persuasion of Carey wrote The History of Raja Pritapadityu was published in July 1801. This was the Press's first prose work printed in Bengali. Towards the end of 1804 Hetopudes, the first Sanskrit work to be printed was published. In 1806 the original Sanskrit Ramayana with a prose translation and explanatory notes compiled by Carey and Mr Marshman was published.

Historical books in Sanskrit, Hindi, Maratha and Ooriya were nearly printed by 1812. Assamese and Kasmiri historical books were published in 1832. A Grammar of the Bengali Language, compiled by Carey, was first published in 1801. Carey's A Dictionary of the Bengalee Language in three volumes was first published in 1815-25. Other texts published in Bengali included the Buttrish Singhasun, or, The Thirty-two Imaged Throne in 1802, Bengali translations from the original Sanskrit of Vopadeva's Mugdhabodha in 1809, the Hitopadesa in 1802, Rajavuli in 1808, the Gooroodukhina in 1818 and a Bengali translation of a collection of Sanskrit phrases titled Kubita Rutnakar. In 1826 A Dictionary and Grammar of the Bhotanta or Bhutan Language was published. A Comparative Vocabulary of the Burman, Malayau and Thai Languages was published in 1810 in Malay, Siamese and Burmese. The original Chinese text with a translation of the works of Confucius was published in 1809. A geographical treatise called Goladhya was published. The second edition of Sankhya Pruvuchuna Bhashya in Sanskrit was published in 1821.

In 1818 the Serampore missionaries decided to publish the Bengali newspaper Samachar Darpan to study the pulse of the public authorities. They started with Digdarshan, a monthly magazine which received approbation. There was a bilingual (English-Bengali) and a Bengali edition.

Of Bengali works published, schoolbooks were the most profitable and numerous. As vernacular usage increased and was standardized, demand for these educational materials superseded that of almanacs. An evolving social vocabulary also developed in the latter half of the century, as education become more accessible: by the mid 1870s, social-critique pamphlets, typically produced by lower-caste urban elites dominated printed materials. These short, snippy works would often lament urban life. Though no longer published in Serampore, their language often drew on linguistic traditions solidified in the early years of the press.

=== Influence ===
As printing increased across the continent, it became highly inconvenient to send materials to Serampore for print. In 1838, Baptist missionary Charles Lacey brought an English-printing press to Orissa to print documents for Cuttack missionaries. The Oriya font that was used in its first prints was likely brought over from Serampore. The Orissa Mission continued to print from Serampore and Calcutta even after the establishment of their own press.

== Funding ==
Initially the missionaries faced problems to raise money for printing. In 1795, Carey wrote to the Mission in England that the printing of 10,000 copies of the translated New Testament would cost Rs 43,750, a sum that was beyond his means. In June 1800, the printing work of the Bengali Bible had to be restricted because of the shortage of funds. The missionaries sought to raise money by selling copies of the Bengali Bible for 2 gold mohurs each to the Englishmen in Calcutta. They raised Rs 1500 from this enterprise. From 1804, the Society in England raised Rs 10,000 every year in England to fund the printing of the Bible in seven Indian vernaculars.

Memoirs were often used to track the progress of Serampore’s translations: the first of these publications was of Memoir Relative to the Translations of the Sacred Scriptures in August of 1807. As the mission and its presses faced increasing costs, the same memoir was bound with an engraving of the empress Britannia presenting a printed New Testament to a Bengali native. The republication was used to encourage donation of 58,000 rupees, equivalently 7,250 English pounds.

Once the books became popular, the press started earning enough money to cover costs and leave some profit. This money was entirely devoted for furthering the work of the Mission.

== Fire at the press ==
On 11 March 1812, a devastating fire caused mass destruction in the printing office. Important documents, accounting papers, manuscripts, 14 types in Eastern languages, a bulk of types sent from England, 12 hundred reams of paper and other essential raw materials were destroyed. The manuscripts of the translation of the Ramayana were also destroyed and the project was never resumed. The manuscripts of the Polyglot Dictionary and the blue print of the Telinga Grammar were also destroyed. Luckily the presses themselves were unharmed. It is estimated that property worth Rs 70,000 was lost.

== Closing ==
The Baptist Mission Press in Calcutta inherited the bulk of Serampore’s presses, punches, and printing types in 1837, following William Carey’s death in 1834.

Though the press was formally closed down in 1837, publications from the press continued to flow till later on. At the close of 1845, the King of Denmark surrendered Serampore to the British Government. The spearheads associated with the conception and execution of the Mission Press had all died by 1854. Owing to the lack of staff to take initiative, the press was gradually bereft of financial as well as expert guidance. All printing activities came to a standstill by 1855. After 1857 the British government was reluctant to encourage missionary education. There was a feeling that any strong attack on local customs, practice and beliefs or religious ideas might enrage "native" opinion.

== See also ==
- Early phase of printing in Calcutta
- Ludhiana Mission Press
