= John Mack (Serampore) =

Scottish missionary, chemist, teacher, translator and editor (1797 - 1845)

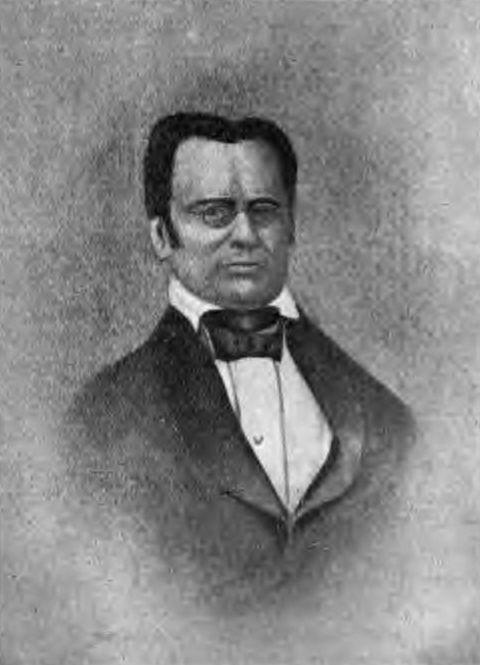
- Portrait of John Mack, from an oil painting at the Baptist Missionary Society
- Born: 12 March 1797
- Died: 30 April 1845 (aged 48)
- Resting place: Serampore, Serampore Missions Burial Ground
- Alma mater: University of Edinburgh
- Occupation: Missionary, teacher, botanical collector, editor, translator, chemist
- Spouse(s): Mary Mack

John Mack of Serampore (12 March 1797 – 30 April 1845) was a Scottish missionary who worked in the Serampore Mission. He took an interest in education and served as a principal of the Serampore College where he taught science and produced the first chemistry textbook in Bengali.

== Life and work ==
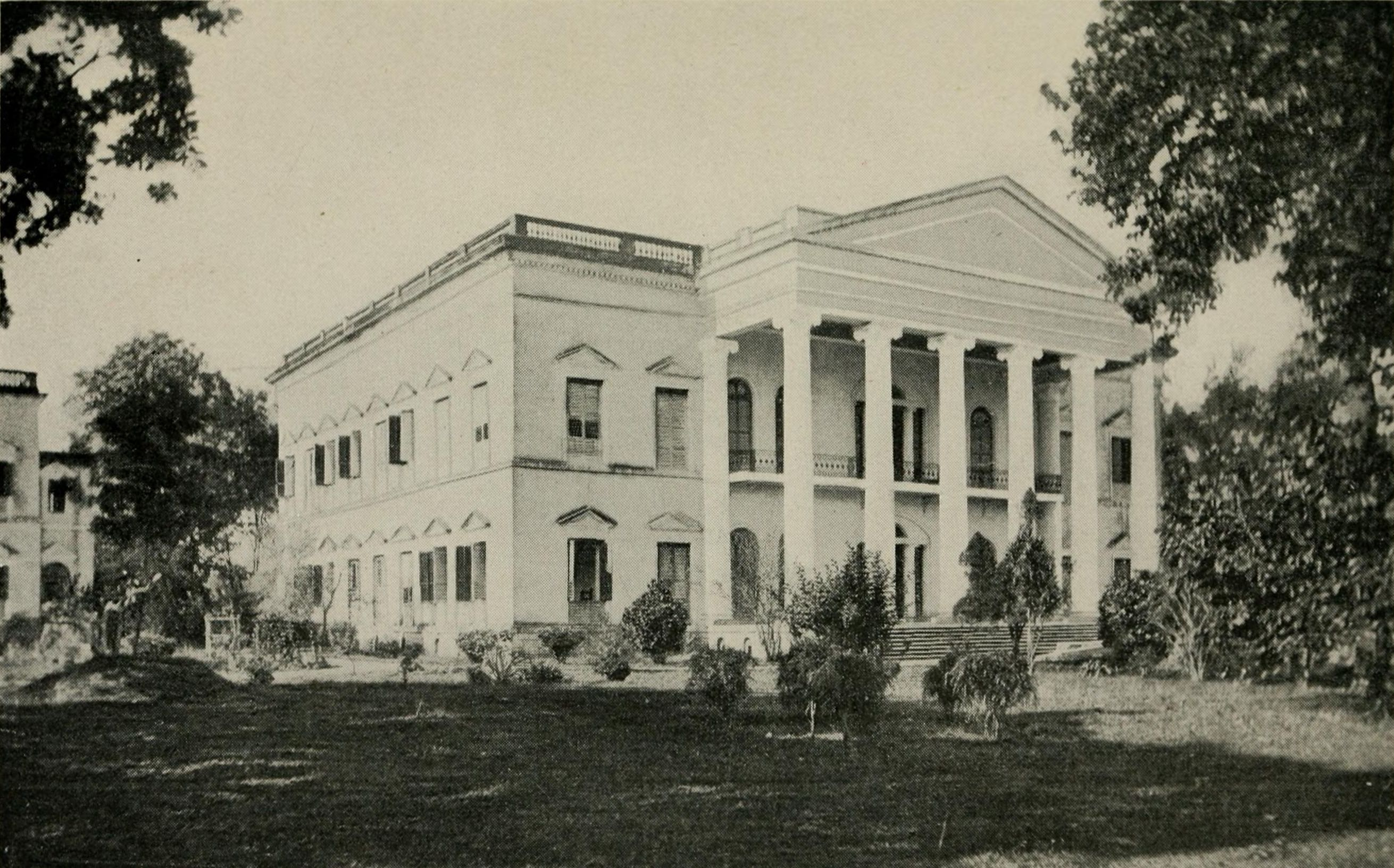
Serampore College, c. 1901

John Mack was born in Edinburgh where his father was a solicitor-at-law in the Sheriffs office. He went to the local high school where he took an interest in the natural sciences. With an interest in joining the ministry of the Church of Scotland, he was sent to school in Gloucestershire to improve his accent. There he met the Baptist minister William Winterbotham who introduced him to the Baptist church. Mack then went to the Bristol Baptist Academy in 1818, much against his family's wishes. He trained in theology under Rev. John Ryland. William Ward was on furlough in Britain in 1821 and was looking for someone to work at the Serampore College and visited the Bristol Baptist Academy. Mack obtained a recommendation from the academy to work in Serampore. Before going to India he went to study natural philosophy at the University of Edinburgh. He also attended courses in Guy's Hospital on chemistry and those on surgery by John Abernethy. He sailed in May 1821 and reached India on 15 November 1821.

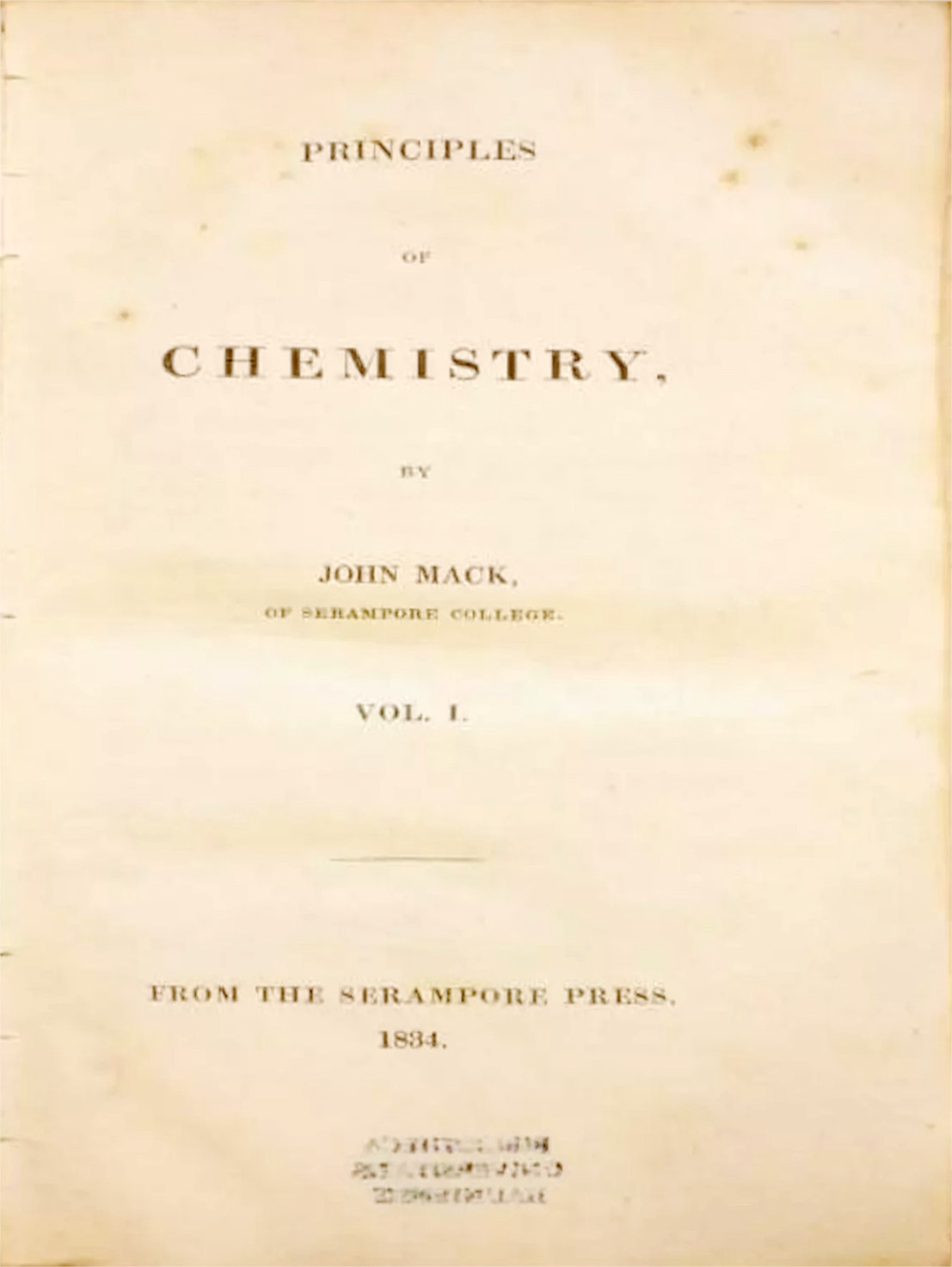
Title page of Principles of Chemistry, Volume 1

Mack served initially as a professor of chemistry at the Serampore College. He taught and produced a bilingual textbook of chemistry in English (Principles of Chemistry, Volume 1) (Note: A second volume was never published) which was translated into Bengali by William Carey's son Felix Carey (died 1822) (Note: Rajesh Kochhar suggested that at least some of the translation, after Felix Carey's death, was done by Mack—who also lectured in Bengali—himself.) as কিমিয়া বিদ্যার সার (Kimia Bidyar Sara) in 1834. He also taught classics, philosophy and geography and had a Bengali translation made of the map of India. The public lectures on chemistry were well attended with nearly 80 to 100 students and he was able to contribute 100 guineas (Note: 100 guineas is £105; that amount in, say, 1835 is equivalent to £13,060 in 2023) to the mission funds from his class earnings. In 1834, the students included 34 Hindus, 6 Eurasians and 43 Indian Christians. He edited a paper called the Friend of India which was founded at Serampore in 1835 along with John Leechman.

William Ward died of cholera in 1823 and Mack served in his place as a pastor at Serampore. He was ordained co-pastor of the Baptist Church in June 1832 and in 1834 he succeeded William Carey as principal of the college. In 1828, Mack's sister Helen joined the Serampore mission but she died in 1830. When Victor Jacquemont visited India, he visited Willam Carey's garden and met Mack and his wife Mary. In 1826 Mack and his wife made a visit to northeastern India and provided Sir William Hooker with a set of plant specimens. (Note: Mary was a plant collector in her own right; her specimens are usually labelled "Mrs John Mack", with her own forename not given.) In 1836 he visited the Khasi Hills and Assam with his wife after which he suffered from a severe fever and it was thought he might not live.

From April 1837 Mack visited England to convalesce from his illness. During his visit he signed an Act of Reunion between the Serampore Mission and the Baptist Missionary Society. He returned to India in 1839 and continued to work at Serampore until his death from cholera during an epidemic in 1845. He was buried in the Serampore Baptist Mission cemetery with the inscription:

Sacred to the Memory of the Rev. John Mack
the beloved Associate in the College,
and the Mission of Carey, Marshman and Ward.
He was born in Edinburgh, March the 12th, 1797,
and died at Serampore, April the 30th, 1845.
This Monument is erected by his affectionate and
disconsolate widow, Mary Mack.

An obituary was printed in Friend of India, and later republished, in pamphlet form, with a foreword by John Fenwick, who attributed the anonymous original to John Clark Marshman. A building at the college was named "Mack House" in the early 1920s.
