= Bengal Gazetti =

Historic Bengali weekly newspaper during the Company rule in India

The Bengal Gazetti was a historic Bengali weekly newspaper published in either 1816 or 1818, and is one of the oldest publications in India. It is believed to the first Bengali language newspaper. The paper was edited by Ganga Kishore Bhattacharya, a former employee of Serampore Mission Press. The newspaper was short lived due to paper being considered an expensive commodity.

== History ==
The Bengal Gazetti was published in either May 1816 or 1818. The publisher of the magazine was Ganga Kishore Bhattacharya and was supported by Harachandra Roy. It continued publishing for around one year. No copies of the paper remain. It is believed to be the first Bengali language newspaper, but there are conflicting reports on when it started publication, and there is some controversy over whether the Gazetti or the Samachar Darpan, published by Serampore Mission Press, came first. The Bengal Gazetti was the first newspaper in India controlled entirely by natives.
