= William Augustus Atlee =

Judge of the Pennsylvania Supreme Court

Coat of Arms of William Augustus Atlee

William Augustus Atlee (1735–1793) was a Judge of the Pennsylvania Supreme Court and a University of Pennsylvania Trustee 1779-1786.

Atlee was born in Philadelphia, Province of Pennsylvania on July 1, 1735. He later moved to Lancaster County where he read law with Edward Shippen, Esq. (future Chief Justice of the Pennsylvania Supreme Court). Admitted to the bar on August 3, 1758, Atlee served on the Pennsylvania Supreme Court from 1777 to 1791. Under the Reorganization Act, he was selected to head the court of the Second District. An avowed Constitutionalist and an active Whig during the American Revolution, his burning patriotic views during the Revolutionary period earned him the name "savage Atlee". Atlee held the office of President Judge for the Second Judicial District until his death on September 9, 1793, at which point John Joseph Henry (November 4, 1758 – April 15, 1811) assumed his place.

The provisions of the Pennsylvania Constitution of 1790 required for the first time that local courts have a Presiding Judge "learned in the law". Atlee was designated as the first President Judge of the Lancaster County court under the 1790 constitution. He held court in a structure in Penn Square, Lancaster, with the first session extending over four days beginning October 31, 1791. The two trials held during that term involved theft, one of a cow and one of a horse. The horse theft case had been held over for re-trial by order of the pre-constitutional court, and the alleged cow thief was cleared on the condition that he pay court costs.

== Family ==
Brother, Samuel John Attlee, 1739-1786. A journal extract of Samuel John Atlee containing details of a battle between the British and the Continentals.

Wife, Esther Bowes Sayre. Eleven Children. Atlee's youngest daughter, Charlotte was the first unmarried woman missionary to work abroad. She arrived in India in 1816.
