= Digdarshan =

Bengali Language Periodical

Digdarshan (Bengali: বাংলা) was the first periodical of Bengal in Bangla language. It was a monthly periodical published by the Srirampur (Serampore) Baptist Mission and edited by John Clark Marshman who was the son of missionary Joshua Marshman. Its first issue was published in April 1818.
