= Ganga Kishore Bhattacharya =

Indian editor, printer, and pioneer of Bengali print and journalism

Gangadhar Bhattacharya (died 1831) was an Indian editor and printer, and pioneer of Bengali print and journalism. He was born in Bahar village, near Serampore, Bengal. He started his career as a compositor at the Serampore Mission Press, later moving to Calcutta, where he first worked at the Ferris and Company Press before setting up his own, the Bengali Printing Press, along with his business partner, Harishchandra Ray.

Having established a press, he started his own business specifically for publishing and selling Bengali books, something he had himself previously trialed at Ferris. Serampore's Samachar Darpan wrote highly of him. Apart from the few books he wrote, he published Gangabhaktitarangini, Lakshmicharitra, Betal Panchabingshati, Chanakya Sloka and a collaborative work by Lallu Lal and Ram Mohan Roy.

== Bangal Gezette ==
Apart from establishing the first Bengali book business, Bhattacharya and Roy also established the first Indian-produced newspaper, Bangal Gezette at Chorbagan Street (present Amar Basu Sarani), Calcutta. The Sambad Prabhakar, and thence James Long, P. N. Bose and Swaminath Natarajan have all claimed that Bangal Gezette began publication in 1816, and thus that Indian journalism commenced exclusively at the initiative of natives, rather than outsiders. However, no copies come down to us to confirm this. What is recorded is Harachandra Roy's notice (dated 12 May 1818) in the Government Gazette of 14 May 1818 that: "he intends to publish a Weekly Bengal Gazette, to comprise the Translation of Civil Appointments, Government Notifications, and such other Local Matter, as may be deemed interesting to the Reader, into a plain, concise and correct Bengalee Language..." The Serampore Samachar Darpan came out on 23 May. Bangal Gezette is said to have appeared "within a fortnight" of this date, and is also referred to as having republished Ram Mohan Roy's writings against sati.

== Works ==
Bhattacharya is the author of various works:

A Grammar in English and Bengalee Language (1816) – Published at the Ferris and Co. Press. It contained what was necessary for knowledge of the English language, along with a translation. It was basically an English grammar in Bengali. It was published in a simple language for rousing interest among fickle-minded students. In the same year, another English grammar was published in Bengali called the English Darpan, by Ramachandra Roy. He was the assistant pundit in the Bengali department of Fort William College.

Daybhag (1816–17) – In 1816, in the introduction to English grammar, Ganga Kishore mentions that Daybhag was in the process of completion at the printing press of Ferris and Co. In his introduction to Vyavastha Darpan in 1859, Shyamacharan Sharma-Sarkar wrote that it was one of the best religious books ever written in Bengali. It talks about the three procedures of liability, period of religious impurity and expiation in brief.

Chikitsarnab (1820) – One of the khandas of the Chikitsarnab was in the library of Radhakanta Deb. Later on it was reprinted from Battala.

Drabyagun (1828) – Drabyagun was reprinted from Battala in 1868.

Among his edited works are:

Annada Mangal (1816) – Bharatchandra's Annadamangal included the Tales of Biddyah and Sunder, to which was added the Memoirs of Rajah Pratapaditya. It was printed from the Press of Ferris and Co. in Calcutta. It was the first known illustrated work in Bengali. It was embellished with line-engraving and had six pictures. The blocks used to make the pictures were prepared by Ramchand Roy, who was probably related to Harachandra Roy.

Bhagbadgita – He published the annotated version of the Bhagbadgita. It first came out in 1820. The second edition was published in 1824, a khanda of which is in the Bangiya Sahitya Parishad Library.

== See also ==
- Print media in India
- Early phase of printing in Calcutta
