= Serampore Trio =

Trio of English missionaries

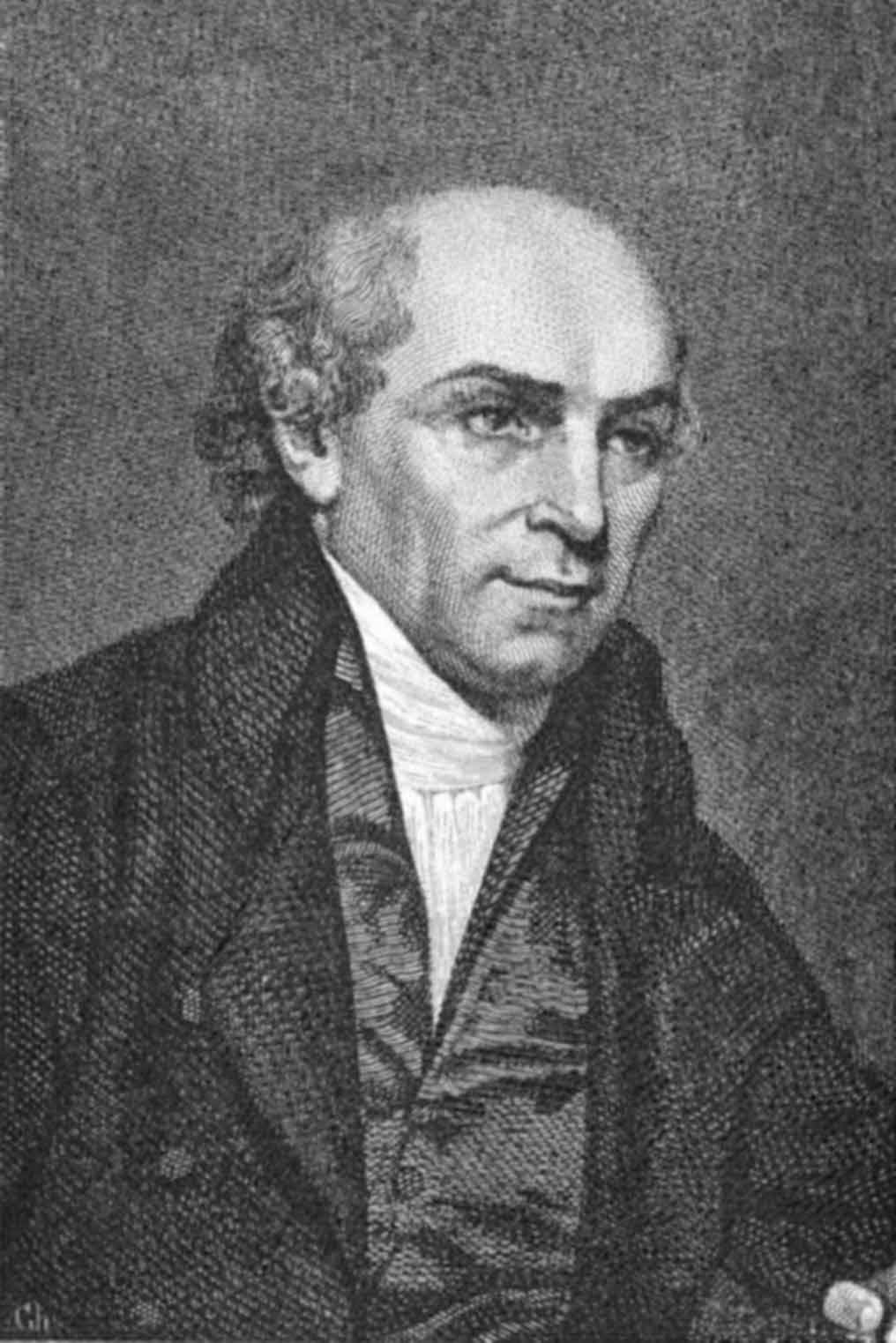
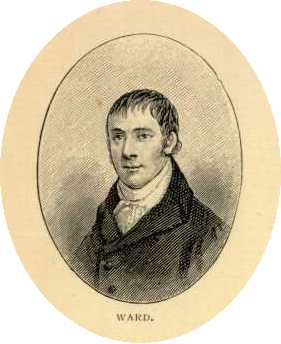
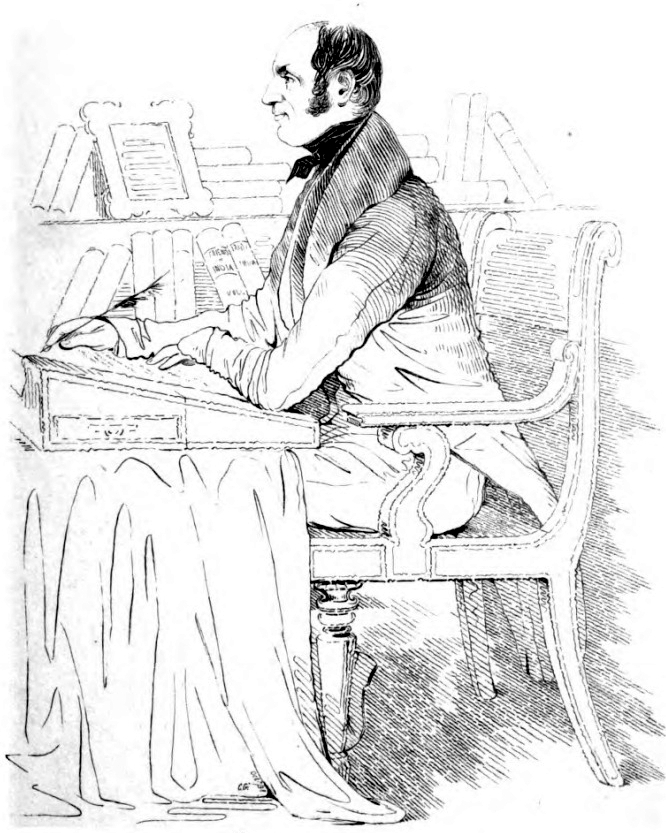
Left to right: William Carey, William Ward, and Joshua Marshman

The Serampore Trio was the name given to three pioneering English missionaries in India, namely William Carey (1761–1834), a shoemaker, Joshua Marshman, (1768–1837), a schoolteacher, and William Ward (1769–1823), a printer. William Carey arrived in Bengal in 1793 and Marshman and Ward arrived in 1799. As missionaries were prohibited from working in areas controlled by the British East India Company, they selected as their base a Danish trading post in the village of Serampore, 13 km (8.1 miles) north of Calcutta. They became known as the Serampore Trio.

== New college in Serampore ==
On 5 July 1818, Carey, Marshman and Ward issued a prospectus (written by Marshman) for a proposed new "College for the instruction of Asiatic, Christian, and other youth in Eastern literature and European science". Thus was born Serampore College, which continues to this day.

At times funds were tight, and after a rumour alleging misapplication of funds caused the flow of funds being raised by Ward in America dried up, Carey wrote, "Dr. Marshman is as poor as I am, and I can scarcely lay by a sum monthly to relieve three or four indigent relatives in Europe. I might have had large possessions, but I have given my all, except what I ate, drank, and wore, to the cause of missions, and Dr. Marshman has done the same, and so did Mr. Ward."

The trio's aim was to give an education in arts and sciences to students of every "caste, colour or country" and to train people for ministry in the growing church in India (See: Christianity in India).

From its beginning the college has been ecumenical but this means that it has no automatic basis of support from any one branch of the Christian church. Prior to 1818, the Serampore Trio had worked together in providing education for their own children and the children, including females, of the native Indians.

== See also ==
- John Mack (Serampore)
- Serampore Mission Press

== Further information ==
- Arts of transitional India twentieth century, Volume 1 By Vinayak Purohit
- National Council of Churches review, Volume 126
- Muslims and missionaries in pre-mutiny India By Avril Ann Powell
- Banglapedia: national encyclopedia of Bangladesh, Volume 3
- Encyclopedia of evangelicalism By Randall Herbert Balmer
- Christianity Today
