= Serampore College =

College in Serampore, India

- College Emblem
- Motto: Latin: Gloriam Sapientes Possidebunt
- Established: 15 July 1818; 208 years ago
- Founders: William Ward, William Carey & Joshua Marshman
- Religious affiliation: Baptist
- Academic affiliations: Senate of Serampore College (University) and University of Calcutta
- Principal: Dr. Dipesh Kundu
- Administrative staff: 79 (teaching); 30 (non-teaching)
- Students: 2,277
- Location: 8, William Carey Road, Serampore, West Bengal, 712201, India; 22.7519011°N 88.3512874°E
- Campus: Urban
- Website: seramporecollege.ac.in

Serampore College is located in Serampore, in West Bengal, India. Established in 1818, it is the fourth oldest college in the country after Old Seminary, Kottayam (Established 1815), CMS College, Kottayam and Presidency College in Kolkata, and one of the oldest continuously operating educational institutes in India. The college consists of two entities: The theological faculty and a separate college with faculties of arts, science, commerce.

The Senate of Serampore College (University) is in charge of the academic administration of all the theological colleges affiliated with it. The council of Serampore College holds a Danish charter and had the power to confer degrees in any subject, which it currently exercises only for conferring theological degrees as recommended by the senate.

Degrees to students at the college in the fields of arts, science and commerce are awarded by the University of Calcutta.

For theology, the college is affiliated to the Senate of Serampore College, with which several theological colleges and seminaries all over India, Nepal, Bangladesh and Sri Lanka are affiliated.

== Motto ==
The college motto is from Proverbs 3:35 in the Vulgate: Gloriam Sapientes Possidebunt, "The wise shall possess glory."

== Authority to issue degrees and accreditation ==
The Serampore Trio - William Ward, William Carey, & Joshua Marshman, started the college with 37 students in 1818. King Frederick VI of Denmark originally granted a Royal Charter giving Serampore College the status of a university to confer degrees on 23 February 1827. It became the third Danish University after the ones in Copenhagen and Kiel. With the later establishment of the University of Calcutta in 1857 the arts, science and commerce parts of Serampore College were affiliated to the University of Calcutta. However, Serampore College still today continues to enjoy the privilege of conferring its own degrees in theology under the power vested by the Charter and Act of Serampore College. It is a private Grant-in-aid Minority College and is recognized by the University Grants Commission under Section 2(f) and 12(b) of the UGC Act, 1956.

== History ==
Since Serampore was then a Danish colony, King Frederick VI, the King of Denmark, issued Serampore College its Royal Charter of Incorporation on 23 February 1827, in Copenhagen, Denmark (Charter, 1, Charter, 2, Charter, 3). The charter came in response to Joshua Marshman's visit to King Frederick in August 1826; the charter gave Serampore College the privilege of awarding degrees in Arts and Theology. William Carey, Joshua Marshman, and John Clark Marshman (Joshua's son) were designated as members of the first Council. At its opening, the Trio released a prospectus which proposed "A College for the instruction of Asiatic Christian and other Youth in Eastern Literature and European Science." The college was open to all persons of any caste or creed, and the founders ensured that no denominational test would apply to faculty members. The charter has also been confirmed by the Bengal Govt Act. IV of 1918.

The status accorded by the Danish Charter has since been re-affirmed for the study of Theology and now forms the basis for degrees of all levels conferred by over forty theological colleges throughout India, and is administered by the Senate.It was incorporated by Royal Charter of 1827 and Bengal Government Act. IV of 1918.

=== Founding by English missionaries ===
Serampore College is one of the oldest university in India to be in continuous operation. It was founded in 1818 by the English missionaries known as the Serampore Trio:

- William Carey
- Joshua Marshman
- William Ward

Their aim was to give an education in arts and sciences to students of every "caste, colour or country" and to train people for ministry in the growing church in India (See: Christianity in India).

From its beginning the college has been ecumenical but this means that it has no automatic basis of support from any one branch of the Christian church. Prior to 1818, the Serampore Trio had worked together in providing education for their own children and the children, including females, of the native Indians.

=== Original charter from Denmark ===
Since Serampore was then a Danish colony, King Frederick VI, the King of Denmark, issued Serampore College its Royal Charter of Incorporation on 23 February 1827, in Copenhagen, Denmark (Charter, 1, Charter, 2, Charter, 3). The charter came in response to Joshua Marshman's visit to King Frederick in August 1826; the charter gave Serampore College the privilege of awarding degrees in arts and theology. William Carey, Joshua Marshman and John Clark Marshman (Joshua's son) were designated as members of the first council. At its opening, the Serampore Trio released a prospectus which proposed "A College for the instruction of Asiatic Christian and other Youth in Eastern Literature and European Science." The college was open to all people of any caste or creed, and the founders ensured that no denominational test would apply to faculty members. The charter has also been confirmed by the Bengal Government Act IV of 1918.

The status accorded by the Danish charter has since been reaffirmed for the study of theology and now forms the basis for degrees of all levels conferred by over forty theological colleges throughout India and is administered by the senate. It was incorporated by Royal Charter in 1827 and the Bengal Government Act IV of 1918.

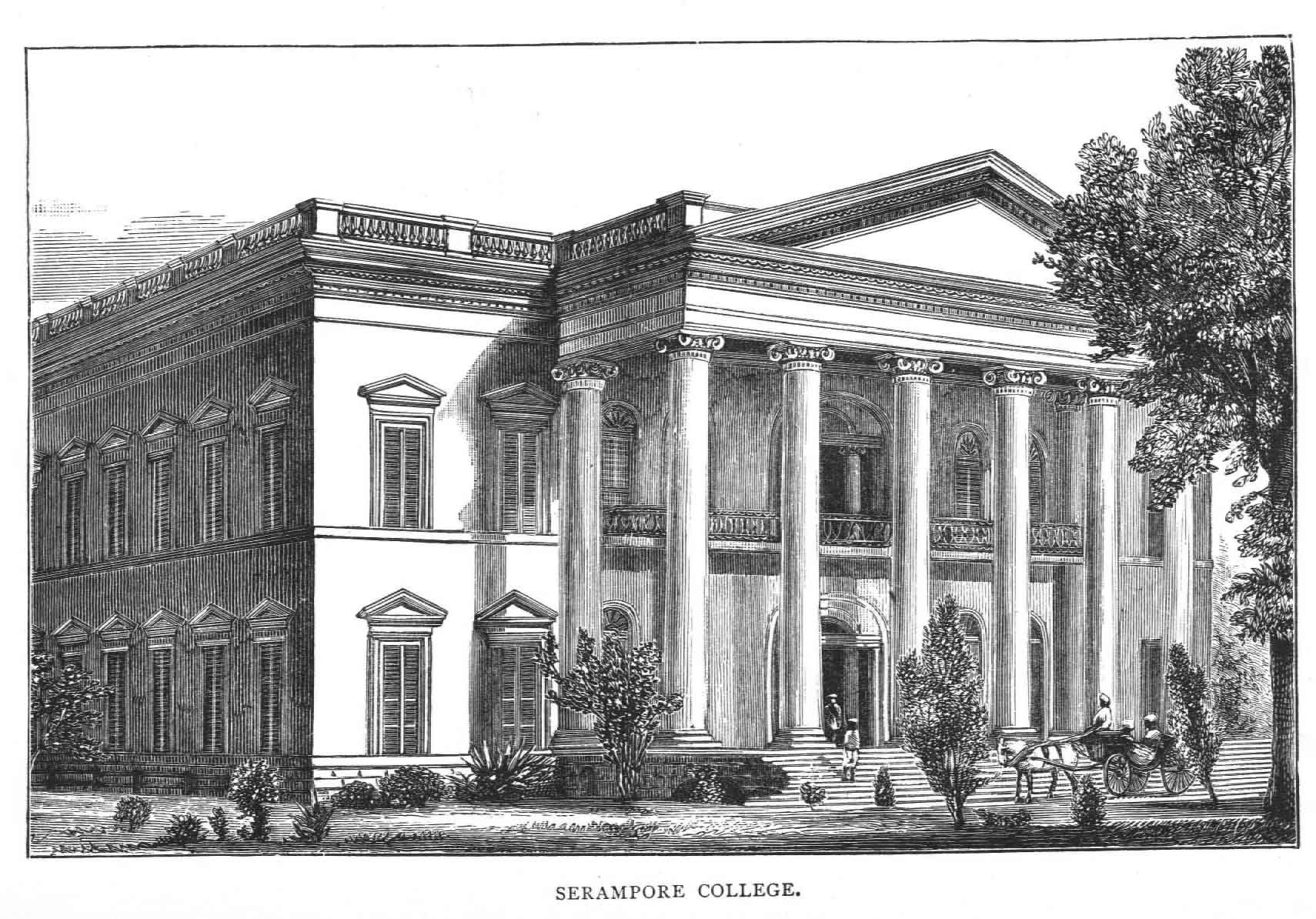
Serampore College

=== Control passed back to the British ===
After 22 February 1845 when Denmark sold all of its Indian assets to Britain, the management and operation of the college continued without interruption under the direction of a master and council. In 1856 the Baptist Missionary Society in England took over the management of the college and, in 1857, the college became affiliated with the newly established University of Calcutta and became a constituent college of that university. In 1883 the college closed as an arts college and began functioning as a Christian Training Institution and a theological institute for the Baptist churches in Bengal. Affiliating again with the University of Calcutta in 1911, Serampore College, in 1913, was authorised to award the Bachelor of Arts degree. The college faculty was interdenominational.

=== Twentieth century ===
On 4 December 1915, the first group of Bachelor of Divinity students graduated:

- I. W. Johory, professor in the Canadian Mission College, Indore;
- N. G. Kuriakos, a priest in the Orthodox Syrian Church; and
- D. M. Devasahayam, London Missionary Society, South India.

Between 1916 and 1927, sixty-nine further students earned their Bachelor of Divinity degrees through Serampore College.

During the centenary year of the college, in 1918, the Bengal Legislative Council passed the Serampore College Act (1918 Act, i, 1918 Act, ii, 1918 Act, iii, 1918 Act, iv) for the purpose of enlarging the college council and forming a new interdenominational senate that would confer theological degrees for all Christian denominations in India. By 1960 twenty other Indian colleges and seminaries affiliated themselves with Serampore.

The name of the college and its founders are honoured today more widely than just within Christian circles – the Carey Library at Serampore houses 16,000 rare volumes and is used by scholars from across the world.

== Principals ==
Years	Name	Academic credentials
1818–1832	^{✝}William Carey	
1832–1837	^{✝}Joshua Marshman	D.D
1837–1845	^{✝}John Mack	
1845–1858	^{✝}W. H. Denham	
1858–1879	^{✝}John Trafford	B.A. (Glasgow)
1879–1882	^{✝}Albert Williams	B.A. (Glasgow)
1883–1906	^{✝}E. S. Summers	B.A.
1906–1929	^{✝}George Howells	PhD (Tübingen)
1929–1949	^{✝}G. H. C. Angus	M.A.
1949–1959	^{✝}C. E. Abraham	M.A. The First Indian Principal
1959–1966	^{✝}William Stewart	M.A.
1966–1968	^{✝}S. J. Samartha	PhD (Hartford)
1968–1969	A. K. Mundle	M.A.
1969–1972	M. N. Biswas	M.A.
1972–1976	S. K. Chatterjee	M.A.
1976–1977	R. L. Rodrigues	M.A. (Jadavpur)
1977–1987	S. Mukhopadhyay	PhD
1988–1989	T. K. Swarnakar	M.A.
1990–1998	J. T. K. Daniel	PhD (Madras)
1999-2011	Lalchungnunga	PhD (NEHU)
2011-2015	Laltluangliana Khiangte	PhD (NEHU)
2015-2024	Vansanglura Vanchhawng	PhD (Mizoram)
2024-2026	Subhro Sekhar Sircar	
2026-present	Dr. Dipesh Kundu	PhD

== Departments and courses ==
The college offers different undergraduate and postgraduate courses and aims at imparting education to the undergraduates of lower- and middle-class people of Srerampore and its adjoining areas.

=== Science ===
Science faculty consists of the departments of Chemistry, Physics, Mathematics, Botany, Zoology, Physiology, and Economics.

=== Arts & Commerce ===
Arts and Commerce faculty consists of departments of Bengali, English, Communication English, Sanskrit, History, Geography, Political Science, Philosophy, Education, and Commerce (Finance & Accounting).

=== Theology ===
This faculty consists of different christian religion related subjects.

== Honours ==
On 7 June 1969, the Indian Department of Posts issued a stamp and a first day cover depicting Serampore College. In 2017, to commemorate the bicentennial anniversary of the university, Denmark's ambassador to India, Mr. Peter Taksøe-Jensen announced that the Danish Government decided to grant 18 outstanding students of Serampore College through the King Frederik VI Scholarship.

== Accreditation ==
The college is recognized by the University Grants Commission (UGC). This college was accredited by the National Assessment and Accreditation Council, and awarded A grade.

== Gallery ==
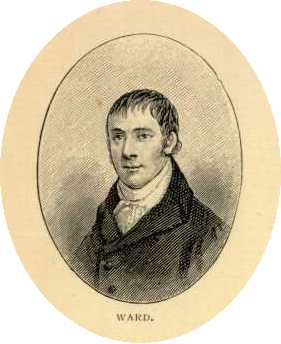
William Ward

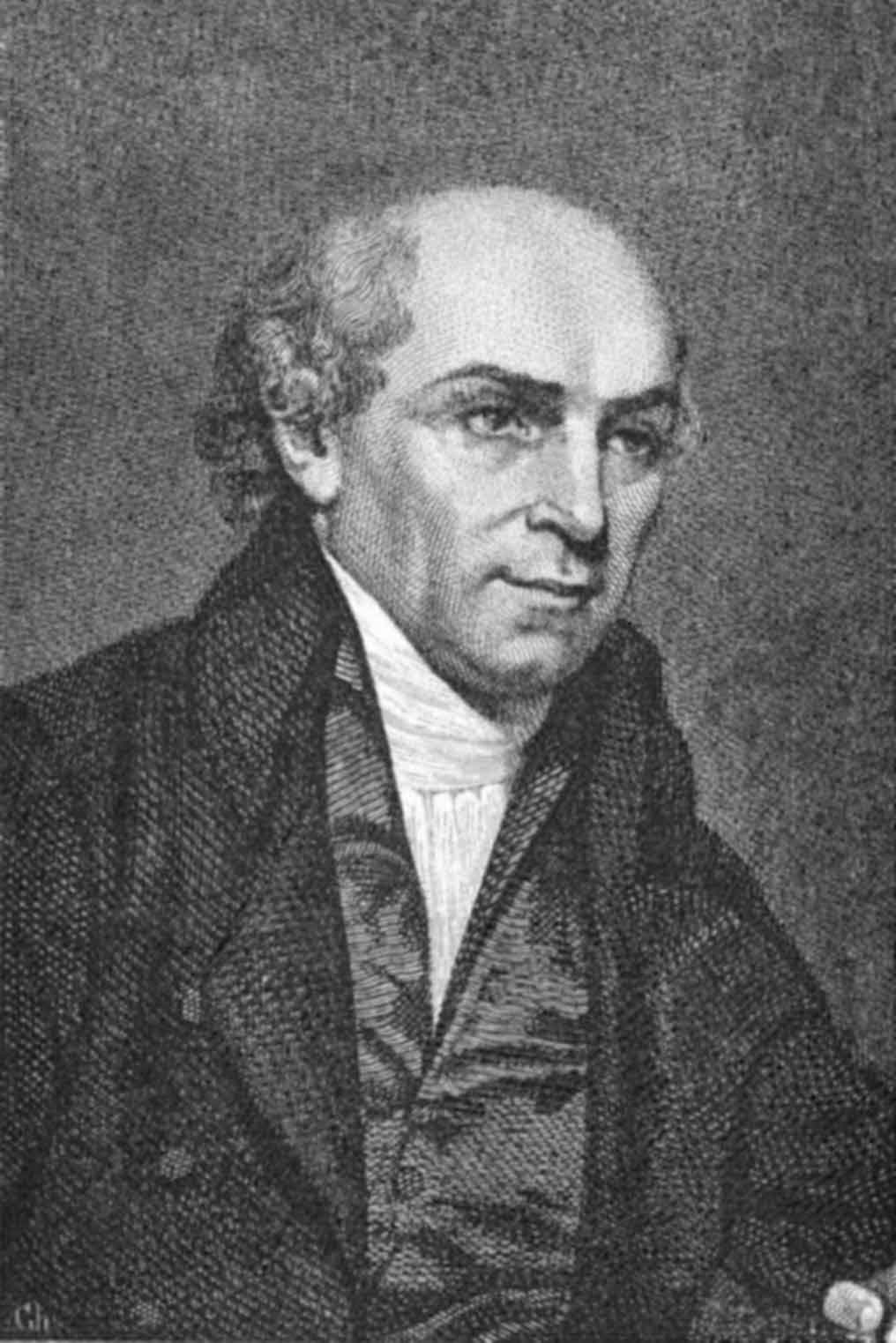
William Carey

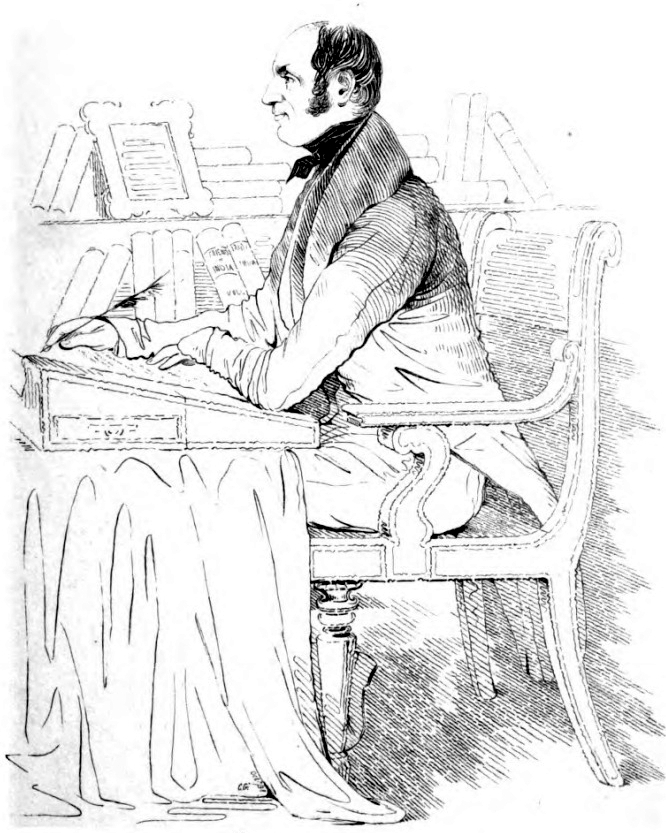
John Clark Marshman

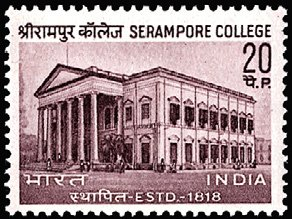
Postage stamp

== Notable alumni ==
- Benoy Choudhury
- Babul Supriyo

== See also ==
- List of colleges affiliated to the University of Calcutta
- Education in India
- Education in West Bengal
