= Joshua Marshman =

Christian missionary (1768–1837)

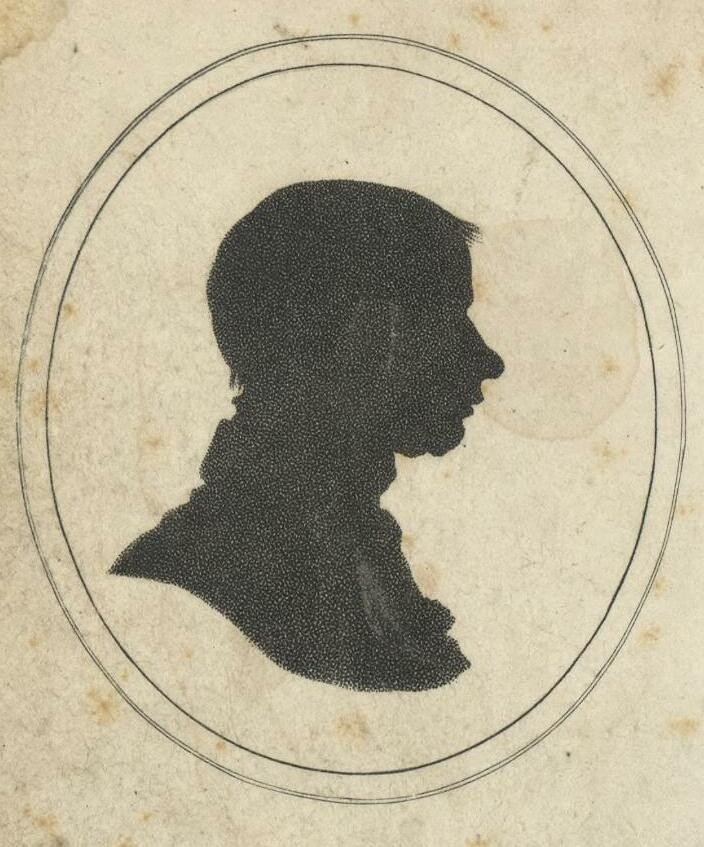
19th-century silhouette portrait of Marshman

Joshua Marshman (20 April 1768 – 6 December 1837) was a Baptist missionary in Bengal, India from 1799 until his death. He was a member of the Serampore trio with William Carey and William Ward. The trio founded Serampore University, many primary and secondary schools, and translated and published a large number of works, including translations of the Bible. Marshman was "an accomplished scholar, linguist and theologian and was a prolific author and polemicist". His mission involved social reforms and intellectual debates with educated Hindus such as Raja Ram Mohan Roy.

== Origins ==
Joshua Marshman was born on 20 April 1768 in Britain at Westbury Leigh, Wiltshire, England. His father, John Marshman was a weaver. Of his family little is known, except that they traced their descent from an officer in the Army of Cromwell, one of a band who, at the Restoration, relinquished, for conscience-sake, all views of worldly aggrandisement, and retired into the country to support himself by his own industry.

His father John passed the early part of his life at sea and was engaged in the Hind, a British frigate commanded by Captain Robert Bond, at the 1759 capture of Quebec. Shortly after this, he returned to England and in 1764 married Mary Couzener. She was a descendant of a French family who had sought refuge in England following the revocation of the Edict of Nantes; after his marriage he lived in Westbury Leigh and took up the trade of a weaver.

== Early days ==
Marshman's family were poor and could give him little education. In 1791, Joshua married Hannah Shepherd and in 1794 they moved from Westbury Leigh to Bristol. There they joined the Broadmead Baptist Church. Baptists at that time were dissenters who separated from the Church of England. Marshman taught in a local charity school supported by the church. He also studied at the Bristol Baptist College.

Marshman was appointed a missionary by the Baptist Missionary Society. On 29 May 1799 Marshman his wife and their two children set out from Portsmouth for India aboard the ship Criterion. Although there was a threat of a French naval attack the family landed safely at the Danish settlement of Serampore, a few miles north of Calcutta, on 13 October 1799.

== Family ==
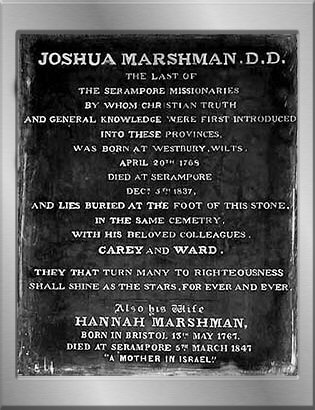

The couple had 12 children; of these only five were alive when their father died. Their youngest daughter Hannah married Henry Havelock, who became a British general in India, and whose statue is in Trafalgar Square, London. Their daughter Rachel was married to the forestry administrator Sir Dietrich Brandis.

When he first met pioneering missionary William Carey's four boys in 1800, Marshman was appalled by the neglect with which Carey treated them. Aged 4, 7, 12 and 15, they were unmannered, undisciplined, and even uneducated. Marshman, his wife Hannah, and their friend the printer William Ward, took the boys in tow. Together they shaped the boys as Carey pampered his botanical specimens, performed his many missionary tasks and journeyed into Calcutta to teach at Fort William College. They offered the boys structure, instruction and companionship. To their credit – and little to Carey's – all four boys went on to useful careers.

Marsman's son, John Clark Marshman (1794–1877), was also to become an important part of the missionary work at the college; he was also an official Bengali translator and published a Guide to the Civil Law which, before the work of Macaulay, was the civil code of India; he also wrote a "History of India" (1842).

== Translation work ==
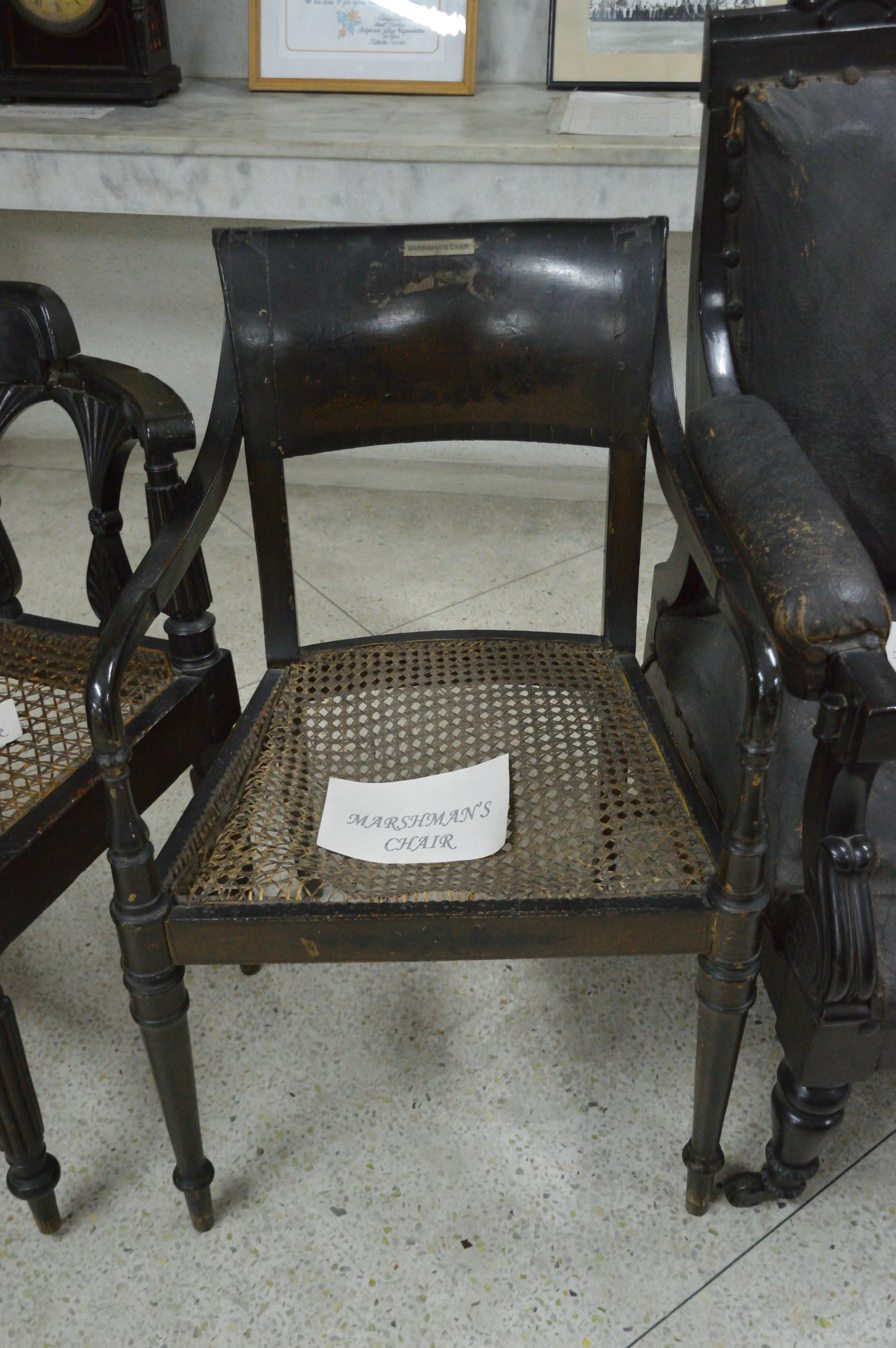
Chair used by Joshua Marshman, at the Serampore College.

Like Carey with whom he had come to work, Marshman was a talented and gifted scholar. Marshman and Carey together translated the Bible into many Indian Languages as well as translating much classical Indian literature into English, the first being their 1806 translation of the Ramayuna of Valmeeki.

In early 1806, he, together with two of his sons and one of Carey's, moved to Serampore to begin training in Chinese under the instruction of Prof. Hovhannes Ghazarian (Johannes Lassar), a Macao-born Armenian, fluent in Chinese, who, together with two Chinese assistants, had been attracted to Fort William by Carey's promise of a salary of £450 per annum. Marshman studied for at least five years under Ghazarian during which time Ghazarian published several of the gospels.

In 1809 he produced the first direct English translation of the Analects, replacing an existing 1691 indirect translation via French and Latin. The work describes itself as the first of two planned volumes, but the second volume does not appear to have ever made it to print.

Marshman's November 1809 Dissertation on the Characters and Sounds of the Chinese Language was followed, in 1814, by his Clavis Sinica: Elements of Chinese Grammar, the former being the earliest known published work of Romanisation of Chinese for English speakers, pre-dating Davis (1824) and Morrison (1828). The quality of his work, both in principle and execution, was the subject of strident criticism from Davis.

In 1822, the first translation of the Bible into Chinese, credited to Lassar and Marshman, was published.

In 1818 he launched the periodical 'Friend of India'.

Marshman had an important role in the development of Indian newspapers. He was a keen proponent of the new developments in educational practice and was keen to encourage school teaching in local languages, even though the colonial authorities preferred that lessons be given in English.

== Foundation of Serampore College ==
On 5 July 1818, William Carey, Joshua Marshman and William Ward (another member of their missionary team) issued a prospectus (written by Marshman) for a proposed new "College for the instruction of Asiatic, Christian, and other youth in Eastern literature and European science". Thus was born Serampore College, which still continues to this day.

At times funds were tight, and after a brief and false rumour alleging misapplication of funds caused the flow of funds being raised by Ward in America to dry up, Carey wrote,

Dr. Marshman is as poor as I am, and I can scarcely lay by a sum monthly to relieve three or four indigent relatives in Europe. I might have had large possessions, but I have given my all, except what I ate, drank, and wore, to the cause of missions, and Dr. Marshman has done the same, and so did Mr. Ward.

== Works ==
- Marshman, Joshua (1809a). Dissertation on the characters and sounds of the Chinese language: including tables of the elementary characters, and of the Chinese monosyllables. Serampore: Mission Press. OCLC 20216718.
- Marshman, Joshua (1809b). The Works of Confucius. Serampore: Mission Press.
- Marshman, Joshua (1814). Elements of Chinese Grammar: With a Preliminary Dissertation on the Characters, and the Colloquial Medium of the Chinese, and an Appendix Containing the Tahyoh of Confucius with a Translation. Serampore: Mission Press. doi:10.1017/CBO9781139507288. ISBN 9781139507288.

== Bibliography ==
- Marshman, John Clark (1859). The Life and Times of Carey, Marshman and Ward. Vol. I & II. London: Longman, Brown, Green, Longmans, & Roberts.
- Sunil Kumar Chatterjee (2001). John Clark Marshman (a trustworthy Friend of India). OCLC 51228078.
- The Council of Serampore College (2006). The Story of Serampore and its College. OCLC 173263455.
