= William Ward (missionary) =

English pioneer Baptist missionary, author, printer and translator (1769–1823)

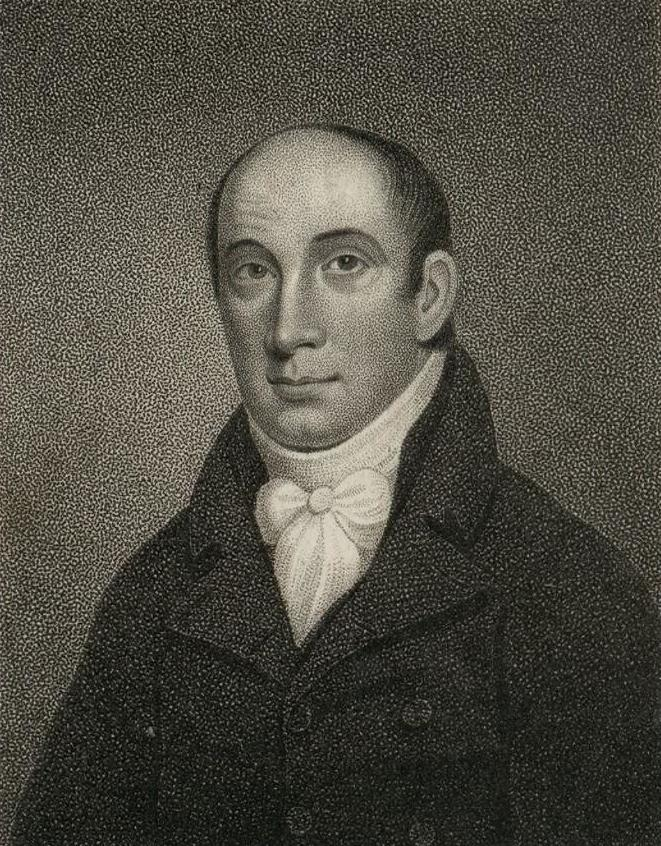
- Born: 20 October 1769; Derby, England
- Died: 7 March 1823 (aged 53); Serampore, India
- Occupations: Missionary, author, printer, translator

William Ward (20 October 1769 – 7 March 1823) was an English Baptist missionary, author, printer and translator.

== Early life ==
Ward was born at Derby on 20 October 1769, and was the son of John Ward, a carpenter and builder of that town, and grandson of Thomas Ward, a farmer at Stretton, near Burton upon Trent in Staffordshire. His father died while he was a child, and the care of his upbringing fell to his mother. He was placed with a schoolmaster named Congreve, near Derby, and afterwards with another named Breary.

On leaving school he was apprenticed to a Derby printer and bookseller John Drewry (1732-1794), with whom he continued two years after the expiration of his indentures, assisting him to edit the Derby Mercury. In 1793, Ward moved to London to study typesetting before relocating once again to Stafford, where he assisted Joshua Drewry, a nephew of his former master, to edit the Staffordshire Advertiser from its prospectus in late 1794 to the fall of 1795. At the end of 1795, Ward proceeded to Hull, where the Rawson printing firm employed him to focus solely upon improving their infant newspaper, the Hull Advertiser. Ward continued to edit the Hull Advertiser through the summer of 1797 before leaving for his own ministerial studies.

Ward was involved with local and national sociopolitical campaigns for the abolition of the slave trade, pacificism, and parliamentary reform. Contrary to most secondary sources on his life, Ward was not involved in the Thelwall riot in Derby on March 6, 1797.

== Religion ==
Ward early in life became a Baptist, and on 28 August 1796 he was baptised at Hull. Preaching constantly in the neighbouring villages, he became known as a man of promise, and, with the assistance of a member of the Baptist community named Fishwick, he proceeded in August 1797 to Ewood Hall, near Halifax in Yorkshire, the theological academy of John Fawcett (1740–1817), where he studied for a year and a half.

== Missionary work ==
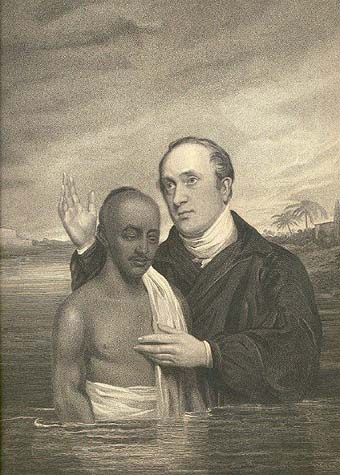
"William Ward baptizing a Hindoo in the Ganges at Serampore", print (1821) from a painting by John Jackson

In the autumn of 1798, the Baptist mission committee visited Ewood, and Ward offered himself as a missionary, influenced perhaps by a remark made to him in 1793 by William Carey concerning the need for a printer in the Indian mission field.

Ward sailed from England in the Criterion in May 1799 with Hannah and Joshua Marshman. On arriving at Calcutta he was prevented from joining Carey by an order from the Government, and was thereby obliged to proceed to the Danish settlement of Serampore, where he was joined by Carey.

In India, Ward's time was chiefly occupied in overseeing the community's printing press, which was used to disseminate the scriptures, once they had been translated into Bengáli, Mahratta, Tamil, and twenty-three other languages. Numerous philological works were also issued and Ward still found time to both keep a copious diary and to preach the gospel to the natives.

On 10 May 1803, he was married at Serampore to the widow of John Fountain, another missionary, by whom he left two daughters.

Until 1806, he made frequent tours amongst the towns and villages of the province, but after that year the increasing claims of the press on his time, and the extension of the missionary labours in Serampore and Calcutta, prevented him quitting headquarters. In March 1812, the printing office was destroyed by fire. It contained the types of all the scriptures that had been printed, to the value of at least ten thousand pounds. The moulds for casting fresh type, however, were recovered from the débris, and with the help of friends in Great Britain the loss was soon repaired.

He characterised Hindus as "effeminate, deceitful, lazy and ignorant."

On 23 May 1818, the Samachar Darpan was printed at the Serampore press; it was the first newspaper it had printed in any oriental language.

The Arms of Serampore College founded by Ward, Marshman and Carey

== Serampore College ==
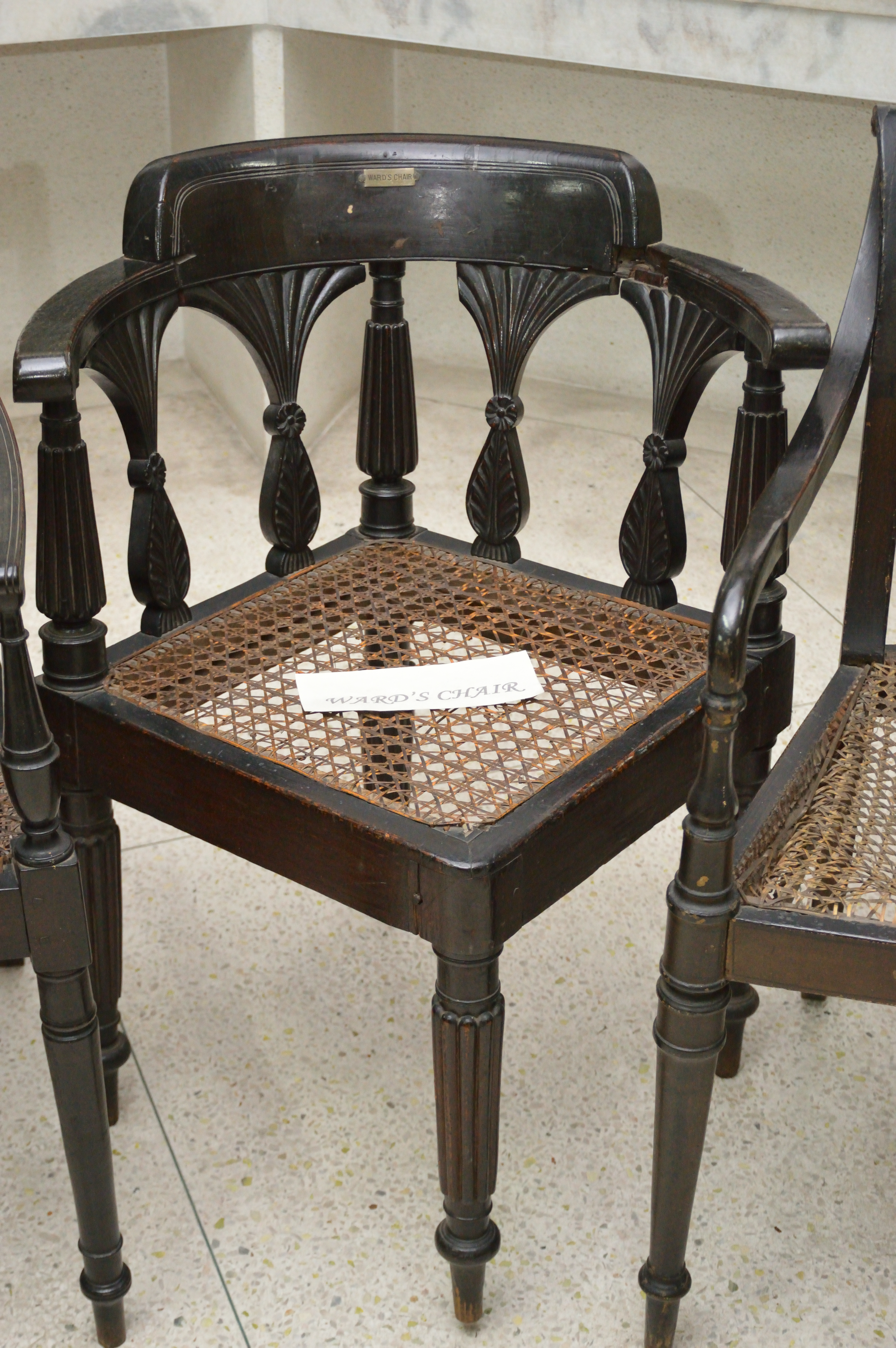
Chair used by William Ward, at the Serampore College.

In 1818, Ward, having been for some time in bad health, revisited England. Here he was entrusted with the task of pleading for funds with which to endow a new college at Serampore which he had founded along with Joshua Marshman and William Carey, for the purpose of instructing natives in European literature and science.

He undertook a series of journeys throughout England and Scotland, and also visited Holland and North Germany. In October 1820, he embarked for New York, and travelled through the United States, returning to England in April 1821. On 28 May, he sailed for India in the Alberta, carrying funds for Serampore College; as a result, Ward, Marshman and Carey became known as the Serampore trio.

== Death ==
Ward died of cholera at Serampore on 7 March 1823, and was interred in the mission burial-ground.

== Written works ==
Besides his sermons, Ward was also the author of:

- 'A View of the History, Literature and Mythology of the Hindoos' (1806)
- 'Account of the Writings, Religion, and Manners of the Hindoos,' Serampúr, 1811, 4 vols. 4to; 5th edit., abridged, Madras, 1863, 8vo.
- 'Farewell Letters in Britain and America on returning to Bengal in 1821,' London, 1821, 12mo; 2nd edit. 1821.
- 'Brief Memoir of Krishna-Pal, the first Hindoo, in Bengal, who broke the Chain of the Cast by embracing the Gospel;' 2nd edit., London, 1823, 12mo.

He was also the author of several hymns, sonnets and short poems which were printed as an appendix to a memoir of him by Samuel Stennett. A portrait, engraved by R. Baker from a painting by Overton, is prefixed to the same work.

== Sources ==
- Stennett's "Memoirs of the Life of William Ward", 1825;
- "Memoir of William Ward", Philadelphia;
- Simpson's Life prefixed to "View of History, Literature, and Religion of the Hindoos" 1863
- Lee, Sidney, ed. (1899). "Ward, William (1769-1823)" . Dictionary of National Biography. Vol. 59. London: Smith, Elder & Co.
- Marshman's "Carey, Marshman, and Ward" 1864
- Full text of Memoir of the Rev. William Ward, American Sunday School Union, 1828.
