= Christian seminaries and theological institutions in India =

India is home to one of the world’s oldest Christian traditions, particularly that of the Saint Thomas Christians of Kerala. Before formal seminaries were established, candidates for the priesthood were trained through the Malpan system, or Malpanate. Similar to the Indian gurukula tradition, candidates studied under an experienced priest called a Malpan and received instruction in Syriac, Scripture, liturgy and pastoral ministry.

Western-style institutional education later developed through Portuguese, Baptist and British missionary influences. The Jesuit seminary at Rachol in Goa started in 1609 became an important centre of priestly and theological education. The Orthodox Theological Seminary, also known as the Old Seminary, had been established in Kottayam in 1815 with the support of British Resident John Munro, and Church Missionary Society missionaries later contributed to its educational work. Baptist missionaries William Carey, Joshua Marshman and William Ward founded Serampore College and the Senate of Serampore College (University) in 1818 and was incorporated by the royal charter, granted in 1827, by the Danish King, Frederick VI. It became a significant centre of higher and theological learning. India is also home to one of Asia’s two pontifical universities and athenaeums: Dharmaram Vidya Kshetram (DVK) in Bengaluru, the only one of its kind in India.

== Overview ==
There are three kinds of seminaries in India:

- Roman Catholic seminaries for churches that are in full communion with the Catholic Church and are affiliated with the Pontifical Universities in Rome. The Dharmaram Vidya Kshetram is the only Pontifical University/Athenaeum in India.
- Evangelical seminaries for churches that are part of World Evangelical Alliance and are affiliated with the Asia Theological Association.
- Ecumenical seminaries for churches that are part of World Council of Churches and are affiliated with the Senate of Serampore College (University).

Various bodies coordinate theological education in India (see Theological associations in India).

The majority of the seminary degrees awarded in India are not recognised by the University Grants Commission. The Roman Catholic seminaries are often affiliated with Pontifical Universities in Rome or DVK. The degrees and doctorates awarded by Senate of Serampore and Asia Theological Association (ATA) are not legally recognized under Section 22 of the UGC Act. The Senate of Serampore derives its power to grant degree from the Royal Charter granted by King Frederick VI of Denmark. Senate of Serampore is also the first institution to grant degrees in India.

The degree titles such as

- Bachelor of Theology (B.Th., Th.B., or B.Theol.),
- Bachelor of Sacred Theology (B.Th. or S.T.B.),
- Bachelor of Divinity (B.D. or B.Div.),
- Master of Divinity (M.Div.),
- Master of Theology (M.Th., Th.M. or M.Theol.),
- Master of Sacred Theology (S.T.M),
- Licentiate of Theology (L.Th. or S.T.L.),
- Licentiate of Canon Law (J.C.L.),
- Licentiate in Biblical Studies (L.S.S.),
- Licentiate (canonical degree),
- Doctor of Ministry (D.Min.),
- Doctor of Sacred Theology (S.Th.D.),
- Doctor of Theology (D.Th., Th.D. or D.Theol.) ,
- Doctor of Canon Law (J.C.D.) and
- Doctor of Divinity (D.D. or D.Div.)

are not listed under UGC Act for the purpose of the Section 22 of the Act and hence can be awarded by seminaries without the approval of UGC.

The degree titles such as

- Bachelor of Arts (B.A.),
- Master of Arts (M.A.),
- Master of Philosophy (M.Phil.),
- Doctor of Philosophy (Ph.D. or D.Phil.),
- Doctor of Letters (D.Litt.) or (Litt.D.)

are listed under the purposes of Section 22 of UGC Act and hence only those institutions with university status as approved by parliament within the meaning of Section 2(f) of the UGC Act can confer such titles. According to Section 22(2) of the UGC Act it is illegal in India for institutions other than those with university status as approved by parliament within the meaning of Section 2(f) of the UGC Act to confer research, professional or honorary doctorates, academic titles or degree certificate that are listed for the purposes of Section 22 of the UGC Act. Therefore, most seminaries do not award these titles unless affiliated with a university.

Seminary students having degrees that are not listed under UGC Act are not eligible to sit for public service examinations, or avail public employment or government research grant, etc. based on their degrees. Since there are no government or UGC approved theological institutions in India that provide degrees in biblical languages and Christian theology, the degrees awarded by these seminaries are accepted and recognised by universities and seminaries outside of India peninsular, especially in Europe and North America, for further studies and research.

== Major seminaries and theological institutions in India ==
Some of the prominent Christian seminaries and theological institutions are shown below along with their year of establishment and academic affiliations and accreditation:

- Rachol Seminary 1609
- St. Joseph's Seminary (Mangalore) 1763, and re-established in 1879 affiliated to the Pontifical Urban University in Rome
- St Joseph Pontifical Seminary 1764
- St Peters Pontifical Institute 1778, Pontifical Institute
- Orthodox Theological Seminary, Kottayam 1815, member of Federated Faculty for Research in Religion and Culture (FFRRC) and affiliated to the Senate of Serampore College (University)
- CMS College Kottayam 1815, affiliated to Mahatma Gandhi University, Kerala (Theology faculty is currently defunct)
- Senate of Serampore College (University) 1818
- Serampore College 1818, affiliated to the Senate of Serampore College (University) and University of Calcutta
- Bishop's College, Calcutta 1820, affiliated to the Senate of Serampore College (University)
- Pontifical Athenaeum Dharmaram Vidya Kshetram 1833, Pontifical University/Athenaeum, (Vatican)
- Madras Christian College, Institute for Advanced Christian Studies 1837, affiliated to University of Madras
- Karnataka Theological College 1847, affiliated to the Senate of Serampore College (University)
- Vidyajyoti College of Theology 1879, Jesuit
- Baptist Theological Seminary 1882, formerly affiliated to the Senate of Serampore College (University)
- Jnana Deepa, Institute of Philosophy and Theology 1893, Pontifical Institute
- Papal Seminary 1893, affiliated to Jnana Deepa, Institute of Philosophy and Theology
- Aizawl Theological College 1907, affiliated to the Senate of Serampore College (University)
- United Theological College, Bangalore 1910, Autonomous (B.D.) and affiliated to the Senate of Serampore College (University)
- Mennonite Brethren Centenary Bible College 1920, affiliated to the Senate of Serampore College (University)
- Mar Thoma Syrian Theological Seminary, Kottayam 1926, member of Federated Faculty for Research in Religion and Culture (FFRRC) and affiliated to the Senate of Serampore College (University)
- Bethel Bible College 1927, affiliated to the Senate of Serampore College (University)
- Thrikkunnathu Seminary 1930–31, affiliated to the Senate of Serampore College (University)
- IPC India Bible College & Seminary 1930, affiliated to the Senate of Serampore College (University) and accredited by Asia Theological Association (ATA)
- Kerala United Theological Seminary 1943, member of Federated Faculty for Research in Religion and Culture (FFRRC) and affiliated to the Senate of Serampore College (University)
- Southern Asia Bible College 1951, accredited by Asia Theological Association (ATA) and Bengaluru North University
- Gurukul Lutheran Theological College 1953, affiliated to the Senate of Serampore College (University)
- St. Thomas Apostolic Seminary, Vadavathoor, 1962, affiliated to Paurastya Vidyapitham, Kottayam.
- St. John's Regional Seminary 1965, affiliated to Roman Curia
- Presbyterian Theological Seminary 1969, accredited by Asia Theological Association (ATA)
- Tamil Nadu Theological Seminary 1969, affiliated to the Senate of Serampore College (University) and Madurai Kamaraj University
- Faith Theological Seminary, Manakala 1970, affiliated to the Senate of Serampore College (University) (G.Th, C.Th, B.A in theology, B.Miss, B.D, M.Th, D.Th)
- Clark Theological College 1972, affiliated to the Senate of Serampore College (University) (B.D, M.Th, D.Th, Diploma in Church Music - DCMM)
- New India Bible Seminary 1975, accredited by Asia Theological Association (ATA)
- Malankara Syrian Orthodox Theological Seminary 1975, affiliated to the Senate of Serampore College (University)
- North India Institute of Post Graduate Theological Studies 1980, affiliated to the Senate of Serampore College (University)
- Paurastya Vidyapitham, Pontifical Oriental Institute of Oriental Sciences, Kottayam, 1982.
- South Asia Institute of Advanced Christian Studies 1982, affiliated to the University of Mysore and accredited by Asia Theological Association (ATA)
- Luther W. New Jr. Theological College 1989, affiliated to the Senate of Serampore College (University) and accredited by Asia Theological Association (ATA).
- South Asia Theological Research Institute 1989, affiliated to the Senate of Serampore College (University)
- Oriental Theological Seminary 1991, accredited by Asia Theological Association (ATA) and Asia Graduate School of Theology
- Faith Baptist Bible College and Seminary 1997, accredited by Association of Baptist Bible Colleges & Seminaries in India
- Pontifical Institute of Philosophy and Theology, Alwaye 1997
- Mary Matha Major Seminary 1997, affiliated to the Université catholique de Louvain, Belgium
- IPC Theological Seminary, Kottayam 2001, accredited by Asia Theological Association (ATA)
- Caleb Institute 2016, affiliated to the Senate of Serampore College (University) and accredited by Asia Theological Association (ATA)
- Advanced Institute for Research on Religion and Culture 2016, affiliated to the Senate of Serampore College (University)

== Seminaries and Bible colleges ==
- Academy of Integrated Christian Studies
- Aizawl Theological College
- Andhra Christian Theological College
- APC Bible College, Bangalore
- Asian Board For Christian Theology-ABCT Chennai
- Bangalore Bible Institute & College
- Baptist Theological Seminary
- Agape Theological seminary,Ernamulam
- Bethel Bible College, Punalur
- Bethel Bible College, Guntur
- Bible Presbyterian Council College
- Central India Theological Seminary
- Charis Bible College, Mumbai
- C.O.T.R Theological Seminary
- Ebenezer Bible College
- Ecumenical Christian Centre
- Emmanuel Theological Seminary, Kota, Rajasthan
- Eva Rose York Bible Training and Technical School for Women
- Evangelical Theological Seminary
- Faith Baptist Bible College and Seminary
- Faith Theological Seminary, Jotsoma
- Gossner Theological College
- Grace Bible College (India)
- Grace Institute For Theological Studies (GIFTS)
- Gurukul Lutheran Theological College
- Harvest Mission College (HMC)
- India Bible College & Seminary, Kumbanad
- Indian Theological Seminary
- IPC Theological Seminary
- International Institute of Biblical Studies
- Japfü Christian College
- Jnana-Deepa Vidyapeeth
- Karnataka Theological College
- Koinonia College of Theology, Pune
- Living Waters Institute of Theology
- Luther W. New Jr. Theological College
- Malankara Syrian Orthodox Seminary
- Maranatha Theological Seminary, Hyderabad
- Maranatha Biblical Seminary, Vijayawada
- Mary Matha Major Seminary
- Master's College of Theology
- Mount Zion Bible College, Mulakuzha
- Nagpur St. Thomas Orthodox Theological Seminary
- North India Institute of Post Graduate Theological Studies
- Oriental Theological Seminary, Chümoukedima
- Rachol Seminary
- Real Colégio de Educação de Chorão
- Ruhalaya Major Seminary, Ujjain, Madhya Pradesh
- SeekersQuest Academy, Bangalore
- Shalom Bible Seminary, Zubza
- St. Aloysius Seminary, Trivandrum
- St. John's Regional Seminary
- St. John's Regional Seminary (Philosophate)
- St. Joseph's Seminary (Mangalore)
- St. Mary's Malankara Major Seminary
- South Asia Theological Research Institute
- South India Faith Baptist College & Seminary, Bangalore
- Southern Asia Bible College, Bangalore
- Southwestern India Bible College, Junnar
- Tamil Nadu Theological Seminary
- Trinity Theological College, Dimapur
- Union Biblical Seminary
- Vidyajyoti College of Theology
- Global Ordination Disciples Diocese Theology Seminary

== See also ==
- Christian colleges and universities in India
