= Paulson Pulikottil =

The Reverend Dr Paulson Pulikottil
- Born: November 6, 1958 (age 68); Kerala, India
- Occupations: Pastor, Theologian, Professor, Author

Academic background
- Education: B.Sc.(Chemistry), Sree Krishna College, Guruvayur; B.D., Union Biblical Seminary, Pune; M.Th, United Theological College, Bangalore; Master of Psychology (Clinical), IGNOU; Ph.D., University of Sheffield, UK
- Alma mater: University of Sheffield
- Thesis: Transmission of Biblical Texts in Qumran: The Case of the Large Isaiah Scroll 1QIsa (1995)
- Doctoral advisor: Philip R. Davies

Academic work
- Discipline: Biblical Studies
- Sub-discipline: Old Testament Studies, Pentecostalism, Postcolonial Theology
- Institutions: Union Biblical Seminary; Faith Theological Seminary, Manakala; New Life College, Bangalore
- Notable works: Beyond Dalit Theology: Searching for New Frontiers; Transmission of Biblical Texts in Qumran: The Case of the Large Isaiah Scroll 1QIsa.

Paulson Pulikottil (born November 6, 1958) is an Indian biblical scholar, theologian, and author, specialising in Old Testament studies. He has published widely on Old Testament scholarship, Pentecostal theology and Postcolonial interpretations of the Bible.

== Early life and education ==
Pulikottil is from Pengamuck, Kerala, India. He was raised in a Christian Pentecostal family. He is an ordained minister of the Indian Pentecostal Church. During his college days he was actively involved with the Union of Evangelical Students of India (UESI).

He earned a Bachelor of Science in chemistry from Sree Krishna College, Guruvayur, followed by a Bachelor of Divinity at the Union Biblical Seminary, Yavatmal/Pune. He went on to complete a Master of Theology in Old Testament studies at the United Theological College, Bangalore, Bangalore. He later obtained a Doctor of Philosophy in Biblical Studies from the University of Sheffield, United Kingdom, for his work on the transmission of the Biblical manuscripts from Qumran.

== Career ==
He has served for more than four decades as a seminary professor in India, most prominently at the Union Biblical Seminary, Pune. During this time he has held senior academic positions, including Academic Dean and Head of the Department of Biblical Studies. He was also involved, alongside David Clines, in the production of the multi-volume Dictionary of Classical Hebrew, published by Sheffield Academic Press.

Pulikottil has also taught at the Faith Theological Seminary, Manakala, the COTR Theological Seminary, and the New Life College, Bangalore, in addition, he continues to serve as adjunct and visiting faculty in theological institutions both within India and overseas. Beyond his academic roles, he is the Senior Pastor of the Community of the Redeemed Church and serves as the editor of the online news magazine the Lodestar.

== Research ==
Pulikottil's research spans several fields within theology and biblical studies. He is recognised as an authority on the Qumran manuscripts, particularly the Large Isaiah Scroll (1QIsa). His work includes postcolonial interpretations of Christian theology, and significant contributions to biblical studies with a particular focus on the Old Testament. He has also engaged critically with Dalit theology, most notably in his book Beyond Dalit Theology: Searching for New Frontiers (2022), where he evaluates its development and suggests new directions for Christology, pneumatology, ecclesiology, and public theology in the Indian context. In addition, his scholarship addresses the intersection of psychology and religion, especially in relation to demonology and psychopathology, and examines Pentecostalism in Kerala within its postcolonial setting.

== Selected publications ==
- Pulikottil, Paulson (2023). The Prince and the Emperor: Selected Themes from the Book of Isaiah. India: Fountain Press. ISBN 9788188784141.
- Pulikottil, Paulson (2022). Beyond Dalit Theology: Searching for New Frontiers. Michigan: Fortress Press. ISBN 9781506478852.
- Pulikottil, Paulson (2014). Psalms – A Commentary (Malayalam) = Sankeerthanangal: Oru Vyakhyanam (in Malayalam). Fountain Press. ISBN 9788188784080.
- Pulikottil, Paulson; Jacob, Grace (2010). Beyond Borders: Challenging Boundaries of Philosophy, Faith and Education. Bangalore: Primalogue.
- Pulikottil, Paulson (2001). Transmission of Biblical Texts in Qumran: The Case of the Large Isaiah Scroll 1QIsa. T & T Clark. ISBN 9781841271408.
- Pulikottil, Paulson (2015). "Isaiah". In Brian Wintle (ed.). South Asia Bible Commentary: A One-Volume Commentary on the Whole Bible. Zondervan. ISBN 978-0310286868.
- Pulikottil, Paulson (1994). "Research Associate". Dictionary of Classical Hebrew, Vol. 2. Sheffield: Sheffield Academic Press. ISBN 9781910928363.
- Synan, Vinson (1992). In the Latter Days (Malayalam): പിൻമഴയുടെ നാളുകൾ. Translated by Pulikottil, Paulson. Kottayam: Good News Publications Society.

== See also ==
- Union Biblical Seminary
