= Johnson Thomaskutty =

Indian theologian

Reverend Dr Johnson Thomaskutty
- Born: Kottarakara, Kerala, India

Academic background
- Education: University of Kerala, BA; Senate of Serampore College, BD; Gurukul Lutheran Theological College, MTh; Princeton Theological Seminary, ThM; Radboud University Nijmegen, PhD
- Thesis: The Nature and Function of Dialogue in the Book of Signs (John 1:19–12:50) (2014)
- Doctoral advisor: Jan van der Watt

Academic work
- Discipline: New Testament Studies
- Sub-discipline: Johannine literature; Dialogical hermeneutics
- Institutions: United Theological College, Bengaluru; Union Biblical Seminary; Serampore College
- Main interests: Gospel of John, Hermeneutics, Contextual Theology, Asian Biblical Interpretation
- Notable works: Dialogue in the Book of Signs (Brill, 2015); Saint Thomas the Apostle (T&T Clark, 2018); An Asian Introduction to the New Testament (Fortress, 2022) "John: Asia Bible Commentary Series" (Langham, 2025)
- Website: https://ntscholarship.wordpress.com/

Johnson Thomaskutty is an Indian New Testament scholar, theologian, and Professor of New Testament and Chairperson of Biblical Studies at the United Theological College, Bengaluru.

== Early life and education ==
Thomaskutty was born in Kollam, Kerala, to a Malayali Christian family. He is an ordained Charismatic minister and an ecumenical theologian hailing from the Indian context. He earned his Bachelor of Arts (BA) in history at University of Kerala, India. He then earned his Bachelor of Divinity (BD) and Master of Theology (MTh) in New Testament from the Senate of Serampore College (University) at Faith Theological Seminary, Manakala, and Gurukul Lutheran Theological College in Chennai, respectively. He later completed a ThM in New Testament studies at Princeton Theological Seminary, New Jersey, USA, and earned a PhD in New Testament under Prof. Jan van der Watt from Radboud University Nijmegen in 2014. His doctoral dissertation was titled The Nature and Function of Dialogue in the Book of Signs (John 1:19–12:50).

== Academic career ==
From 2001 to 2004, he was a lecturer in New Testament and Greek language, and also as a College Chaplain at Serampore College, West Bengal. He then joined the Union Biblical Seminary, Pune, becoming Head of the Department of New Testament, Dean of Biblical Studies, and Dean of Distance Learning (2008–2021). In 2021, he was appointed Professor of New Testament and later on Chairperson of Biblical Studies at the United Theological College, Bengaluru. He is also a Research Associate at the Department of New Testament & Related Literature, University of Pretoria, South Africa. He is a member of the Society for Biblical Studies in India (SBSI), the Society of Asian Biblical Studies (SABS), the Studiorum Novi Testamenti Societas (SNTS), and the Society of Biblical Literature (SBL).

== Research interests ==
Thomaskutty's research explores the literary, theological, and cultural dimensions of the New Testament, with a special focus on the Gospel of John. His work emphasizes dialogue as a defining narrative mode in the Johannine writings, interpreting it through polyphonic, polyvalent, and contextual lenses. He investigates how conversation functions as both a theological and literary device within the Gospel's structure. In addition, he studies the Thomas tradition and the intersections between New Testament texts, apocryphal writings, and early Indian Christianity. A major thrust of his scholarship is the decolonization of biblical interpretation and translation, advocating Asian, linguistic, and cultural frameworks for reading Scripture.

== Books ==
Thomaskutty's books include

- ——— (2015). Dialogue in the book of signs: a polyvalent analysis of John 1:19-12:50. Leiden: Brill. ISBN 978-90-04-30159-7.
- ——— (2019). Saint Thomas the Apostle: New Testament, Apocrypha, and historical traditions. London: Bloomsbury T & T Clark. ISBN 978-0567672841.
- ———; Chansdrankunnel, Mathew, eds. (2021). Wider contextualized biblical spirituality. Delhi: Christian World Imprints. ISBN 978-93-5148-550-6.
- ———, ed. (2022). An Asian introduction to the New Testament. Minneapolis, Minnesota: Fortress Press. ISBN 9781506462691.
- ——— (2023). The Gospel of John: Contemporary Readings. Bangalore: Omega Book World. ISBN 978-9391694760.
- ——— (2025). John: a pastoral and contextual commentary. Carlisle: Langham Global Library. ISBN 9781786412348.
