= Eusabios Kuriakose =

Syriac Orthodox bishop (born 1970)

His Grace Mor Eusebius Kuriakose Metropolitan of Delhi Diocese, Patriarchal Vicar of UAE and Gulf
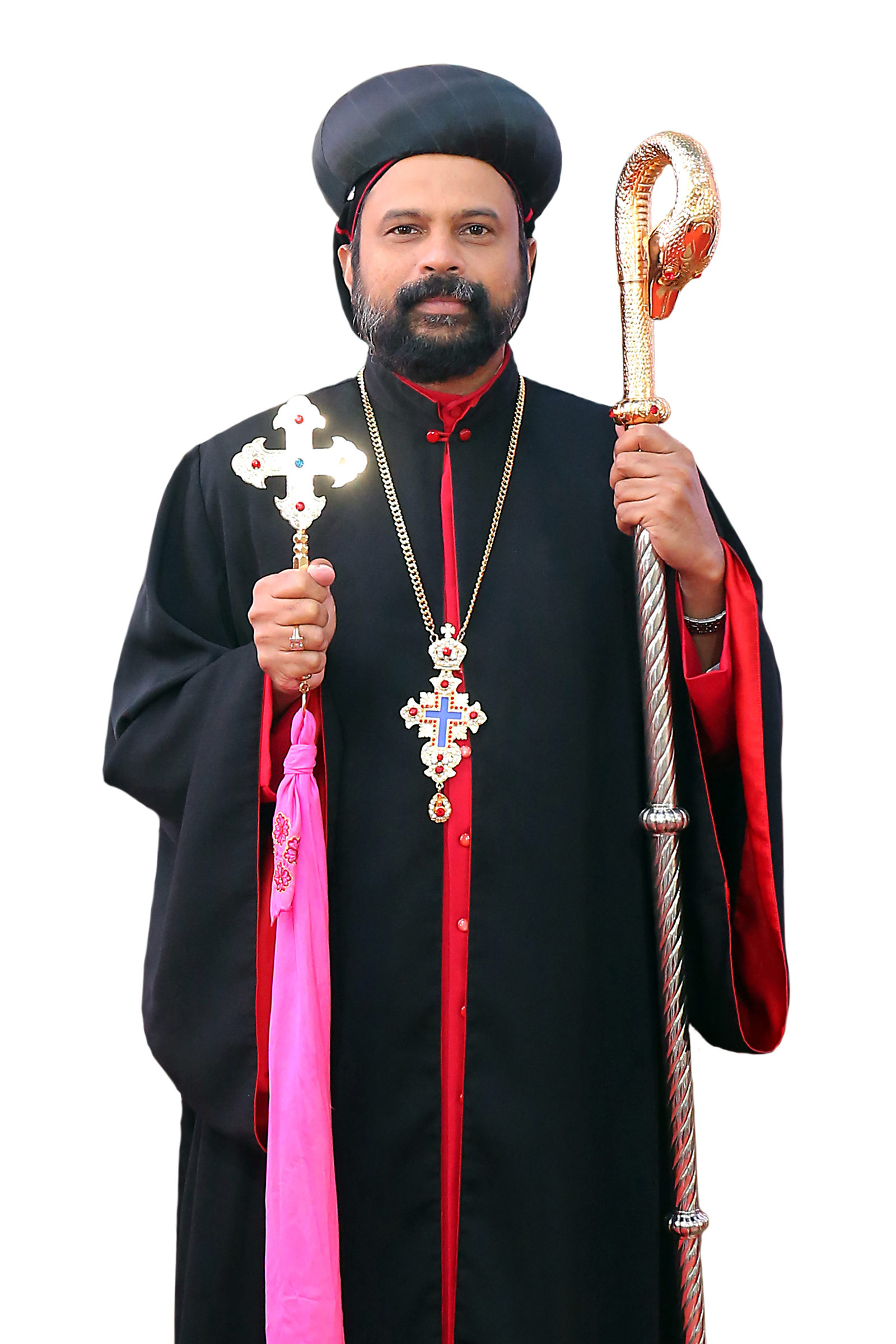
- Mor Eusebius Kuriakose at Kothamangalam Church
- Church: Syrian Orthodox Church
- Diocese: Delhi Diocese, Patriarchal Vicar of United Arab Emirates
- See: Holy Apostolic See of Antioch & All East

Orders
- Ordination: 03 July 2000 (Kassisso) by Mor Thomas Mor Timotheos
- Consecration: 3 July 2006 by Mor Baselios Thomas I Catholicos
- Rank: Metropolitan

Personal details
- Born: September 8, 1970 Angamali
- Education: B.A Sociology, Kothamangalam M.A College Diploma in Theological Studies from M.S.O.T. Seminary; B.D from Bishop’s College, Calcutta M.Th from Pune, Papel Seminary J. D. P.
- Alma mater: Serampore University

Mor Eusabios Kuriakose is a Syriac Orthodox bishop, currently Metropolitan of Delhi Diocese and Patriarchal Vicar of United Arab Emirates.

== Education ==
Mor Eusabios Kuriakose has a B.A degree in Sociology from Mar Athanasius College Kothamangalam. He has also studied at Malankara Syrian Orthodox Theological Seminary at Mulanthuruthy for a diploma in Theological Studies and joined Calcutta Bishops college for Bachelor of Divinity. Later he secured a master's in Theology from Pune, Papel Seminary J. D. P.
