= Stephanos Geevarghese =

Syriac Orthodox archbishop

- Archbishop of the Simhasana Churches in the Malabar Region
- Native name: ഗീവർഗീസ് മോർ സ്തേഫാനോസ്
- Church: Jacobite Syrian Orthodox Church
- Diocese: Malabar Region
- See: Holy Apostolic See of Antioch & All East

Orders
- Ordination: 7 August 2003 by Mor Philoxenos Yuhanon
- Consecration: 14 September 2022 by Moran Mor Ignatius Aphrem II Patriarch
- Rank: Metropolitan

Personal details
- Born: Geevarghese Kuttiparichel; 8 February 1978 Sulthan Bathery, Kerala, India
- Education: Bachelor of Divinity from M.S.O.T. Seminary, Udayagiri; Doctor of Divinity from Teologiska Högskolan Västerbotten Sweden

Mor Stephanos Geevarghese (born Geevarghese Kuttiparichel on 8 February 1978) is a Syriac Orthodox archbishop of Simhasana Churches in the Malabar Region.

== Education ==
- Bachelor of Divinity from M.S.O.T. Seminary, Udayagiri
- Doctor of Divinity from Teologiska Högskolan Västerbotten Sweden

== Books ==
Geevarghese has authored books including Chiriyude Chirathukal, Visudha Vicharangal etc.

== Organ donation ==
In association with Kidney Federation of India, founded by Davis Chiramel, Geevarghese who was aged 39 years, donated his kidney to a Muslim woman who was suffering from kidney ailments.
