= Graham Houghton =

New Zealand historian (1937–2022)

- Born: Graham Whitfield Houghton; 22 September 1937
- Died: 14 February 2022 (aged 84)
- Education: University of California, Los Angeles (Ph.D.)
- Occupation(s): Educator; Historian

Graham Whitfield Houghton (22 September 1937 – 14 February 2022) was a Christian historian and educator from New Zealand. He was the founding principal of the South Asia Institute of Advanced Christian Studies (SAIACS).

== Personal life ==
Graham Houghton was born on 22 September 1937 to Clarence Noel and Francis Winnifred (Pratt) Houghton in Palmerston N., New Zealand. He was raised in New Zealand on a dairy farm in the Awahuri near Feilding.

Houghton left high school during his fifth form year to expand the family farm. However, after a personal religious experience, he left the farm, trained for two years (1960–61) at the Bible College of New Zealand, and became the first NZ missionary sent out by Oriental Missionary Society (now One Mission Society).

Houghton arrived in India to do village evangelism in 1965 and has worked in that country until 2005. His wife Carol Ann (née, McDearmid) moved from Virginia in the United States at an early age with her parents, who were Assemblies of God missionaries. Carol's father, Andrew McDearmid served in India as an Assembly of God minister for 25 years in Lucknow and Bangalore and as President of the Southern Asia Bible College. Their marriage on 24 August 1968 was arranged according to Indian custom by Carol's father.

Houghton died in Maine on 14 February 2022.

== Education and career ==
Houghton completed undergraduate and postgraduate degrees, eventually earning his Ph.D. in South Asian History from the University of California, Los Angeles with a dissertation titled "The Development of the Protestant Missionary Church in Madras 1870-1920: The Impoverishment of Dependency." His dissertation committee was chaired by Stanley Wolpert and included John Semple Galbraith and John Richard Sisson.

Houghton taught for many years as well as serving as the Principal of Madras Bible Seminary before founding SAIACS in 1981. The SAIACS campus now occupies almost five hectares (twelve acres) of land on the North edge of Bangalore. SAIACS has now expanded to a total of about 130 full-time students, all studying at the master's or doctoral level. Students come from many parts of India, and other nations such as Indonesia, Malaysia, Nepal, Myanmar (formerly Burma), Sri Lanka, Thailand, and also Australia and New Zealand. Several have come from Africa and Central America. In the past year a number of Indian Students from the United States have also chosen to come to SAIACS in preparation for working in the sub-continent.

In 1997 SAIACS was recognised by the University of Mysore as an accredited research institution to the university, enabling SAIACS to offer an accredited Indian Ph.D. programme. This is the first Protestant institution to be so recognised since William Carey's Serampore College in 1818. SAIACS graduates are working as organisational and denominational leaders, faculty at a number of bible colleges, seminaries, and graduate schools, and pastors and missionaries with many indigenous missionary agencies throughout South Asia.

In 2001 Dr. Houghton was invited as a part of a group to establish a department of Christianity at Peking University, Beijing, People's Republic of China. Teaching at the masters and Ph.D. level has been going on since then. The courses have reached both Christians from the Three Self Patriotic Church and other Christian groups as well as non-Christian students. As of February 2012, upwards of 100 are enrolled with more than 700 having completed the classes offered.

After Houghton's formal handing over of the SAIACS principalship in 2005, he and his wife moved to Cambridge, New Zealand. Houghton is still active in teaching and mentoring, especially in the Peking University Project. His book, Christian Leadership for Building the Church and Building the Nation, SAIACS Press, 2010 has been widely influential. He was instrumental in the founding of the Caleb Institute.
