= Van der Watt =

Van der Watt is an Afrikaans and Dutch surname. Notable people with the surname include:

- Jan van der Watt (born 1952), South African academic
- Niel van der Watt (born 1962), South African composer
