= MGJ (disambiguation) =

MGJ is the IATA code for Orange County Airport in New York, U.S.

MGJ may also refer to:

- mgj, ISO 639-3 language code for Abureni language
- MG J-type, a sports car produced from 1932 to 1934

== See also ==
- Mor Gregorios Jacobite Students' Movement
