= Bethel Bible College, Guntur =

Ecumenical theological seminary in Andhra Pradesh, India

Bethel Bible College
- బేతేలు బైబిలు కళాశాల
- Coat of arms of Bethel Bible College
- Motto: Latin: AD SERVANDUM COMMITTERE
- Motto in English: "A commitment to serve"
- Type: Theological school
- Established: November 4, 2000; 25 years ago
- Founders: Gospel Mission of India (Registered under Societies Registration Act, 1860)
- Academic affiliations: Senate of Serampore College (University)
- Visitor: Bishop Anilkumar John Servand, MCI
- President: The Rev. V. Leelavathi, CSI
- Principal: The Rev. Selvam Robertson, CNI
- General Secretary: The Rev. P. Jeevan Sylvanus Bose, CSI
- Undergraduates: 500+
- Other students: 200+
- Location: 4th lane, Seethamma Colony, Pattabhipuram Post, GUNTUR TOWN 522 006, Guntur district, Andhra Pradesh, India; 16°18′17″N 80°24′31″E
- Campus: 3 acres; Suburban
- Language: English and Telugu
- Website: www.bethelbiblecollege-edu.com

Bethel Bible College (BBC) is a near-ecumenical seminary located in Guntur, Andhra Pradesh. It is affiliated to modern India's first University - Senate of Serampore College (University). Bethel admits students interested in pursuing theology.

Succession of Principals
- 2003-2005 Bishop Peddi Victor Premasagar, CSI, Ph.D. (St.Andrews)
- 2005-2025 The Rev. Selvam Robertson, CNI, D.Th. (Serampore)

== History ==
Bethel Bible College was founded on November 4, 2000, by Gospel Missions of India, a registered Society under The Societies Registration Act, 1860, founded by The Rev. P. N. S. Chandra Bose, CSI. The institution existed since 1984, offering Diploma level programmes in theology. In year 2000, Bethel began with M.Div. courses accredited by Asia Theological Association (ATA).

=== University affiliation ===
Over a period of time, the management felt the need to streamline the College by affiliating it with a recognised University and sought the guidance of Old Testament Scholar, The Rev. G. Babu Rao, CBCNC, who proposed affiliating Bethel with Senate of Serampore College (University), also providing leads to appoint suitable Theologians to take forward process of affiliation. Following his guidance, the management of Bethel took on board Bishop Peddi Victor Premasagar, CSI, a Cantabrigian and a Theologian of international repute in 2003. He led the affiliation process of Bethel with Senate of Serampore College (University) during tenure of The Rev. Dondapati Samuel Satyaranjan, IPC as Registrar of University. Bishop Premasagar led the College for three years until his death in 2005, which led to appointment of The Rev. Selvam Robertson, CNI, a Scholar in Vaishnavite Studies, who was then teaching at Serampore College, Serampore.

== Memorial lectures and visitors ==
In honour of its founding Principal Bishop Victor Premasagar, CSI and Founder The Rev. P. N. S. Chandra Bose, CSI, Bethel conducts annual memorial lectures in their honour on December 1 and 9th, respectively.

Bethel has had notable personalities visit its campus in Guntur, ranging from Bishop T. B. D. Prakasa Rao, CSI, The Rev. Mani Chacko, CSI, The Rev. Y. T. Vinaya Raj, MMTSC and other Theologians.

== Academics ==
=== Affiliating university ===
The Senate of Serampore College (University) is the first modern University founded in Indian sub-continent in 1827, predating Universities of Madras, Bombay and Calcutta by 29 years. The University was founded by Baptist Missionary Society (BMS) in 1818 by The Rev. William Carey, BMS, Joshua Marshman, BMS, and William Ward, BMS. In 1827, the College was granted the status of a University through a Royal Charter granted by Kingdom of Denmark. In 1918, the Government of Bengal reinforced the University with the passing of The Serampore College Act, 1918. Courses listed by the University are recognised by University Grants Commission (India). A degree holder with B.D. is eligible to pursue M.A. in the discipline of Philosophy in any University in the world.

=== Courses offered ===
As per Senate of Serampore College (University) stipulations, Bethel offers a variety of diploma, undergraduation and postgraduation programmes in the discipline of theology, both in residential and distance modes. Except for Diploma in Christian Studies (Dip. C.S.), which is open to people of all faiths, the rest of the courses are for Churchgoers with requisite qualifications as mandated by the University from time to time.

Courses at BBC
Course Name	Duration	Mode	Academic requirement	Other requirement	Academic Authority
Bachelor of Divinity (B.D.)	2/4/5 years	Residential	Intermediate/ Undergraduation/ B.Th./B.C.S.	Churchgoers	Serampore
Bachelor of Christian Studies (B.C.S.)	4 years	Distance	Undergraduation/ Dip.C.S.	Churchgoers	Serampore
Master of Christian Studies (M.C.S.)	2 years	Distance	B.D./B.C.S.	Churchgoers	Serampore
Diploma in Christian Education (Dip. C.E.)	1 year	Distance	Intermediate	Churchgoers	Serampore
Diploma in Contextual Theologies (Dip. C.T.)	1 year	Distance	Intermediate	Churchgoers	Serampore
Diploma in Christian Studies (Dip. C.S.)	1 year	Distance	Intermediate	Open to people of all faiths	Serampore

=== Faculty Members ===
Faculty members of Bethel represent diverse linguistic cultures and Church traditions from across the country. While most of the faculty are postgraduates (M.Th.), some of them earned doctorates (D.Th.).

Present active faculty
Subject	Name	Gender	Tradition	Highest degree
Old Testament	Chitti Babu Chilaparapu	M	Baptist	M.Th. (Serampore)
Old Testament	A. Koteswara Rao	M	Pentecostal	M.Th. (Serampore)
New Testament	Reji George	M	Charismatic	D.Th. (Serampore)
New Testament	K. Keziah Glory	F	Methodist	M.Th. (Serampore)
History of Christianity	N. S. J. Sudhir	M	Lutheran	M.Th. (Serampore)
History of Christianity	Neuto Kiho	M	Baptist	M.Th. (Serampore)
Systematic Theology	P. A. Seth	M	Charismatic	D.Th. (Serampore)
Systematic Theology	Santosh Kumar Singh	M	Uniting	M.Th. (Serampore)
Systematic Theology	Letgougun Haokip	M	Baptist	M.Th. (Serampore)
Religions	Selvam Robertson	M	Uniting	D.Th. (Serampore)
Religions	Daisy Solomon Kumari Pallikonda	F	Independent	M.Th. (Serampore)
Communication	P. K. Reeja	F	Charismatic	M.Th. (Serampore)
Counselling	Raju Dunna	M	Lutheran	M.Th. (Serampore)

=== Library ===
Bethel has a holding of over 20,000 books and journals for reference and borrowing among its students. The library also houses a personal library collection of its first Principal, Peddi Victor Premasagar, ranging from theological treatises to language learning materials in Latin, Biblical Greek and Biblical Hebrew. The library facilities are overseen by a qualified Librarian led by Smt. Selin Rani-Robertson.

== Notable faculty and alumni ==
=== Notable faculty ===
Bethel has had many faculty members over the years.

- The Rev. James Elisha Taneti,
- Bishop Ch. Victor Moses,
- The Rev. Pau Za Khup,
- The Rev. N. Jerald Praveen,
- The Rev. O. J. Bulliah,
- The Rev. Johnson Vincent,
- The Rev. Babu Emmanuel,
- The Rev. K. B. Jayasree,
- The Rev. Rev. B. John Ratna Raj,
- The Rev. Sean David House,
- The Rev. Tiameren Aier,
- The Rev. Lovely,
- The Rev. Taochila Marwein Jamir,
- The Rev. P. N. S. Chandra Bose,
- The Rev. N. N. Chhatriya,
- The Rev. R. M. Alexander,
- The Rev. B. Joshua,
- The Rev. Akho Dazo,
- The Rev. Y. Chitti Babu Israel,
- Mr. K. John Sobhan,
- The Rev. D. Kamalakar,
- The Rev. D. Bharathi,
- The Rev. Ontimetta Madhusudhana Rao

=== Notable alumni ===
- The Rev. Gifta Angline Kumar, CNI
