= Luther W. New Jr. Theological College =

Christian seminary in Dehra Dun, India

Coordinates: 30.379°N 78.099°E

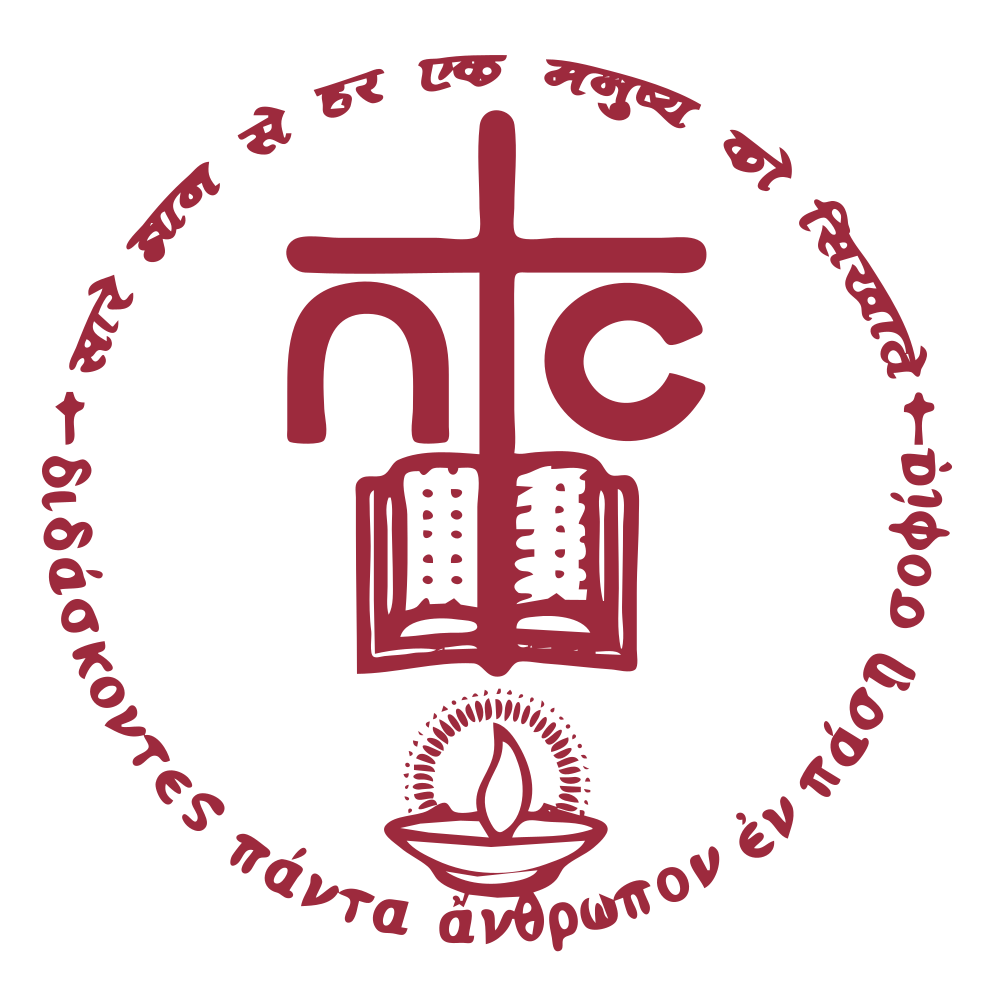
- Type: Seminary
- Established: 1989; 37 years ago
- Affiliations: Senate of Serampore College (University); Asia Theological Association
- Principal: Rev. Dr. Biju Chacko
- Location: Dehradun, Uttarakhand, India
- Website: https://ntc.edu.in

Luther W. New Jr. Theological College, known as NTC, is a private, accredited Christian seminary in Dehra Dun, India. It was founded in 1987 by Malayali Christian missionary George Kuruvila Chavanikamannil. It trains grass-root level Christian workers as well as advanced Christian leadership and theological training.

New Theological College is affiliated with the Senate of Serampore and accredited by Asia Theological Association. It offers certificate, diploma, bachelor's and master's degrees in addition to some basic evangelism courses. MTh programme in Biblical studies and Theology began in June 2011. Courses are offered in Hindi, and English. NTC also has a school of Music in addition to the Theology school.

== Academics ==
The college offers various academic programmes under the Senate of Serampore and Asia Theological Association.

Senate of Serampore College (University) programmes:

- Bachelor of Divinity, 4-5 years
- Master of Theology, 2 years
- Diploma in Music, 1 year

Asia Theological Association programmes:

- Bachelor of Theology, 4 years
- Master of Divinity, 3 years or online 4-6 years
- Master of Theology, 2 years

== Publication ==
The college publishes peer reviewed journal the Doon Theological Journal which is indexed by ATLA.
