= Mor Gregorios Jacobite Students' Movement =

MGJSM
- Mor Gregorios Jacobite Students' Movement
- India

Information
- Motto: To Serve and Bear Witness
- Religious affiliation: Oriental Orthodox Church
- Denomination: Malankara Jacobite Syriac Orthodox Church
- Patron saint: Saint Gregorios Of Malankara
- Established: 6 May 1922
- Founders: St Paulose Mor Athanasiaus
- President of MGJSM: H G Dr. Kuriakose Mor Theophilos
- Vice Presidents: Rev Fr Thomas Pothicote
- General Secretary: Rev Fr Tijo Markose
- Joint Secretary: Ebin Eldho; Ria Susan Sabu
- Headquarters: M S O T Seminary, Vettickal, Mulanthuruthy, Ernakulam, Kerala, India
- Website: MGJSM

Mor Gregorios Jacobite Students' Movement (MGJSM) is the student wing of Malankara Jacobite Syriac Orthodox Church. It is a Christian student organisation in India. The headquarters of MGJSM is located at Malankara Syrian Orthodox Theological Seminary of Ernakulam district in Kerala. 9 || 64 || rowspan="2" | Shinil Paul Mathews Thuruthummel |- | 2015 || St Mary's Jacobite Syrian Cathedral, Morakkala || 14 || 138 |- | 2016 || St Mary's Jacobite Syrian Cathedral Nerchapally, Rakkad || 13 || 68 || Jerin Jacob Paul |}

== Cultural programs ==
MGJSM conducts cultural programs at Regional and Unit levels

1. Christmas Celebration like Jingle Bells by Muvattupuzha Region and Yule by Pallikkara Region.

== Competitions ==
MGJSM conducts arts and sports competition for its members notable being VANQUISH by Pallikkara Region

== Charity work ==
- Educational Aid
- Educational Instruments Distribution
- Aid to people in hazard stricken areas

== Awards ==
Awards and prices are given to Best Units, Regions and also members who have excelled in academic, sports, social and arts fields.

- Best Region Award
- Best Unit Award
- Proficiency Prizes
- Scholarship

Year	Best Region	Best Unit
2010	Koothattukulam	MA College
2011	Pallikkara	Thamarachal
2012	Kochi	Thamarachal
2013	Pallikkara	Morakkala
2014	Muvattupuzha	Rackad
2015	Kolenchery	Kunnackkal
2016	Kothamangalam	Nagancherry
2017	Muvattupuzha	Morakkala
2018	Kothamangalam	Pindimana

== History ==
Founded in 1907 as Syrian Students Conference, it is the first Student Christian Movement in India. It conducted annual conferences till 1912 on a regular basis. After the church split in 1912, the annual conferences were abandoned.

Later on 6 May 1922, a special convention of the Students of the Malankara Jacobite Syriac Orthodox Church was convened at the Cheruthottukunnel St. George Church of Angamaly diocese (in Pallikkara Region), under the initiative of St Paulose Mor Athanasius of Aluva (Valiya Thirumeni). In that meeting Thirumeni proposal of naming the organization after his spiritual mentor, St. Gregorios Geevarghese of Parumala was accepted. Thus 'Mar Gregorios Syrian Vidhyarthi Sangam' (also called Mar Gregorios Syrian Students Association - M.G.S.S.A) came into existence as the student wing of Jacobite Church. This was the first ever student's organization that adopted the name of St. Gregorios of Parumala. The movement gained momentum after this conference and started conducting conferences annually. Units were established in every parish and educational institution with a minimum of 10 Jacobite students. Valiya Thirumeni nourished the organization into becoming the 'back bone' of Jacobite Church. By 1950 the movement had nearly 500 units and a total of nearly 20000 members. During this period most of the church leaders were alumni of MGSSA.

In 1960 MGSSA and St Thomas Syrian Students of Mertran Faction, as it merged with Jacobite Church, merged to form Mar Gregorios Orthodox Christian Student Movement Mgocsm. During this period the Students Movement showed exponential growth and is said to have nearly 700 units and more than 25000 members. But this 'Golden Era' was short lived and soon in 1972 both the churches split apart. MGOCSM under Malankara Orthodox Church and SOSMI (Syrian Orthodox Students Movement of India), the Student wing of Jacobite Church which was later renamed as JASSMI (Jacobite Syrian Students Movement of India) in 2002 when the church adopted a new constitution.

In June 2009, the Holy Episcopal Synod of Jacobite Syrian Christian Church changed the name of the organisation as MGJSM ( Mor Gregorios Jacobite Syrian Students Movement. Annual Leadership Camp named LUMINA has been conducted every year since 2011. The first Regional Office was inaugurated at St Mary's Jacobite Cathedral, Morakkala for Pallikkara Region.
