= Faith Theological Seminary, Manakala =

Theological Seminary in Kerala

Coordinates: 9.1314°N 76.7142°E

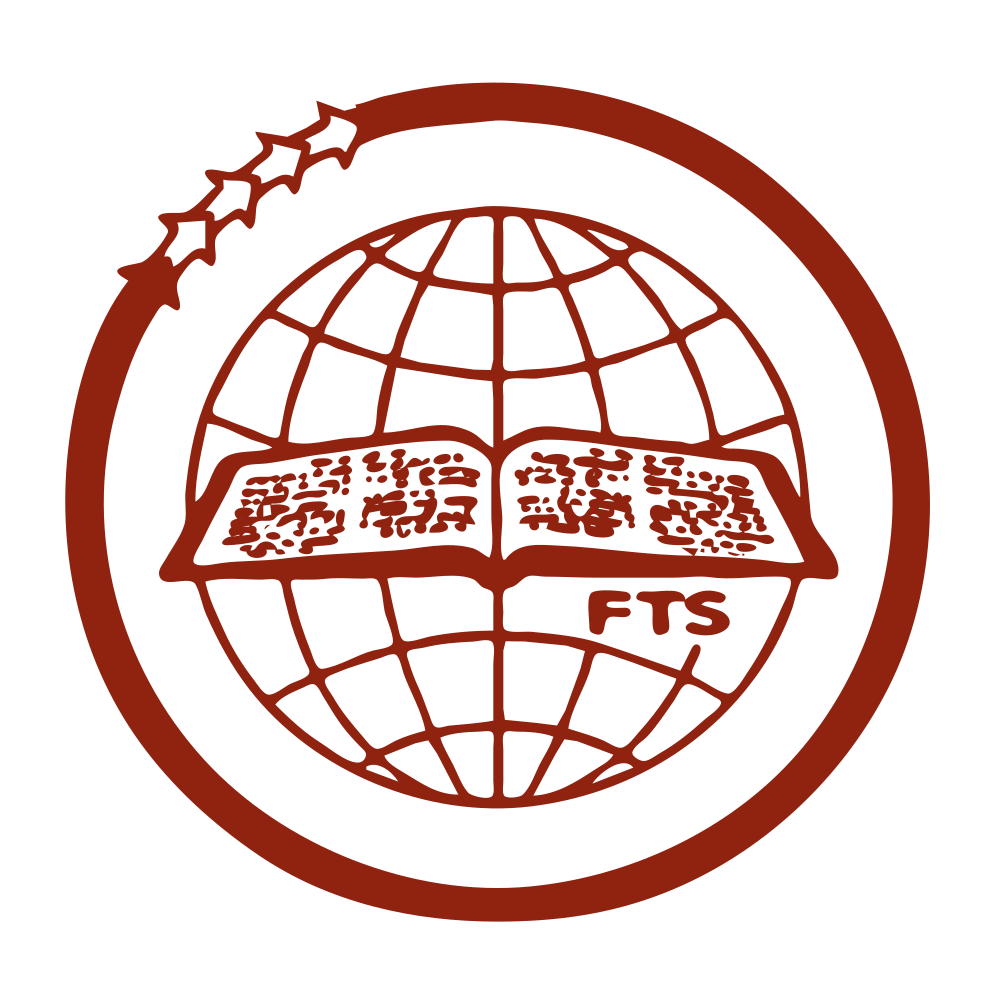
- Type: Pentecostal theological seminary
- Established: 1970
- Founders: Rev. Dr. T. G. Koshy
- Affiliations: Senate of Serampore College (University)
- Location: Manakala, Pathanamthitta, Kerala, India
- Website: http://ftseminary.com/

Faith Theological Seminary, Manakala (FTS Manakala) is a Pentecostal theological seminary located in Manakala, Pathanamthitta, Kerala, India. It was founded in 1970 and is affiliated with the Senate of Serampore College (University).

== History ==
Faith Theological Seminary was established in 1970 by T. G. Koshy, a Pentecostal theologian in South India. Koshy served as the founding principal and was also the leader of Sharon Fellowship Church, which celebrated its golden jubilee in 2020, marking 50 years of academic ministry.

== Affiliation ==
The seminary is affiliated with the Senate of Serampore College (University), India's first university under the 1918 Bengal Government Act, through the Board of Theological Education of the Senate of Serampore College (BTESSC), which oversees theological education across India and South Asia.

== Academic Programs ==
Faith Theological Seminary offers the following degree and diploma programs in theology through Senate of Serampore College (University):

- Certificate in Theology (C.Th.)
- Graduate in Theology (G.Th.)
- Bachelor of Theology (B.Th.)
- Bachelor of Divinity (B.D.)
- Master of Theology (M.Th.)
- Doctor of Theology (D.Th.)

Distance education programs are offered through centers in India and abroad.

== Campus and Faculty ==
The campus is located in rural Manakala, with residential facilities for students and faculty. The seminary's motto is "Perfecting to Make Perfect in Christ."

== Impact ==
The seminary has trained over 4,000 graduates who now serve across India, the Middle East, and North America. FTS alumni are known for their contributions to Pentecostal theology, pastoral leadership, and academic research.

== Notable people ==
Notable people affiliated with this seminary includes,

- Paulson Pulikottil, Old Testament scholar and Hebrew linguist.
- Johnson Thomaskutty, New Testament scholar and Professor.

== See also ==
- IPC Theological Seminary, Kottayam
- Christian seminaries and theological colleges in India
- Senate of Serampore College (University)
- Board of Theological Education of the Senate of Serampore College
