= Israel College of the Bible =

Private Hebrew-speaking Messianic Bible college in Netanya, Israel

- המכללה למקרא
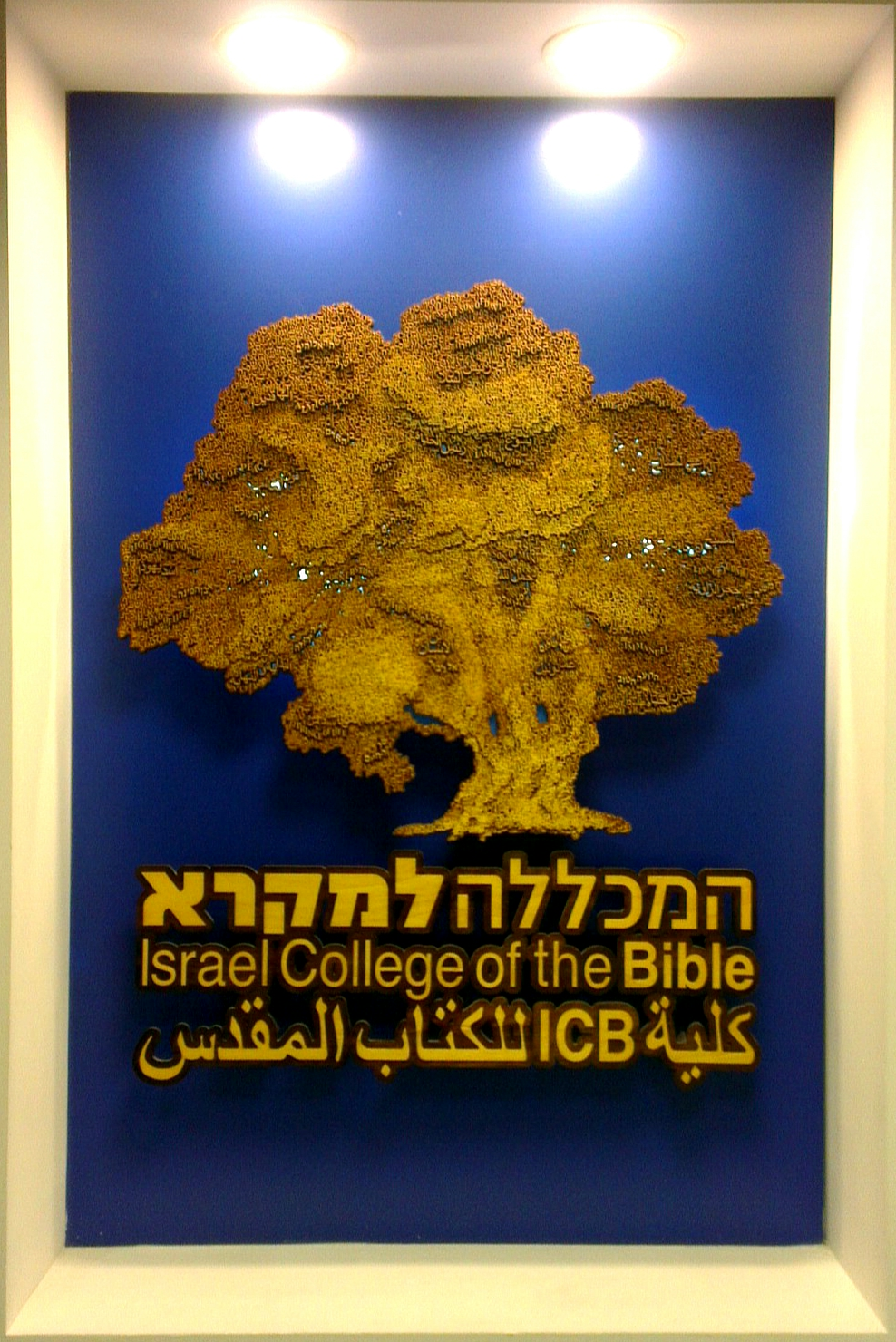
- Other name: ONE FOR ISRAEL Ministry
- Former name: King of Kings College
- Type: Bible College
- Established: 1990
- Affiliations: Reformed Christianity
- Academic affiliations: Dispensationalism
- Chairman: Asi Giza, Adv.
- President: Erez Soref
- Superintendent: Thomas Damianos, Adv.
- Dean: Seth Postell
- Location: Netanya, Israel
- Language: English (main), Hebrew, Russian
- Website: college.oneforisrael.org

Israel College of the Bible (Hebrew: המכללה למקרא), also known as ONE FOR ISRAEL Bible College, is a Christian Reformed fundamentalist private Hebrew-speaking Messianic Bible college in Netanya, Israel. It is an independent academically accredited institution not recognized by the State of Israel.

== History ==
Israel College of the Bible (ICB) was founded in 1990, and provides Calvinist theological and practical training at a Bible school inside the country for Israelis who would previously have had to travel abroad for equivalent courses. It provides theological training for both Israelis and foreign students, and it provides ministry training and leadership development for Christians. The college focuses on training Israelis, both Jewish and Arab, and distance learning courses are available online in English. The college is accredited through the European Evangelical Accrediting Association and the Asia Theological Association, although Israel's Ministry of Education does not recognize its degrees.

The campus moved to its new premises in Netanya in 2010, and has several hundred international online students in its programs and up to 50 Israeli students locally. Israel College of the Bible hosts a large Messianic library of mainly reformed books. The College, and especially the work of Dr. Eitan Bar (founder of ONE FOR ISRAEL who left it in 2022), has been accused by anti-missionary groups as being at the "forefront of missionary activity in Israel".

== Academic scope ==
Israel College of the Bible faculty expertise is primarily in the areas of Bible and Reformed Theology, Jewish studies, Biblical Geography and Culture, Archaeology, Pre-Trib rapture, Practical Ministry, Cessationism, and Leadership and Counseling. The college offers a Hebrew Bachelor of Theology, a Bikurim program, a Bachelor of Arts degree, and Master of Arts counselling. Semester credits can be applied to a certificate in Messianic Studies.

All teachers are believers in Jesus as the Messiah, and come from a variety of cultural backgrounds and countries.

Israel College of the Bible celebrates a Messianic version of the Jewish holidays, and keeps an emphasis in the curriculum on the Jewish origins of Christianity, but claims to be "very inclusive, and live very harmoniously with our Arab brothers and sisters and our Gentile brothers and sisters". The "Linga" organization of Arab Christians in Israel has also affirmed this connection, and has celebrated the graduation of several Arab students who had gained their qualifications from the ICB.

The primary language of the college is Hebrew, with some courses also taught in Russian and English. The teaching staff are all Israeli, and the students come from various ethnic and cultural backgrounds from within Israel.

=== Selected courses in Hebrew ===
The Messiah in the Jewish Scriptures; Apologetics (with an emphasis on Natural Theology); Introduction to the New Testament; Greek; Biblical Aramaic; The Torah; Doctrine of the Messiah and of salvation; Doctrine of Man, Sin and Salvation; Family and Marriage counseling; Pastoral Counseling.

=== Selected courses in English ===
Biblical Archaeology; Biblical Geography; New Testament Backgrounds; Messianic Prophecies; Biblical Hebrew; Jewish Roots of the Christian Faith; The Feasts of Israel; Jewish Apologetics; Jewish Christian Relations; Kingdom and Covenants

== Activities and promotion of "Messianic Judaism" in Israel ==
The college is the headquarters of "One For Israel", which both supports the Messianic community in Israel, and promotes understanding of "Messianic Judaism" abroad. There is a media center on the premises, with radio and video studios, to broadcast music and teaching, as well as being the hub of several websites about the Messianic faith. Eitan Bar, founder of "ONE FOR ISRAEL", claimed that, "The single best and most important way to support Israel is by sharing Yeshua with Israeli Jews and Arabs – and that is what we at oneforisrael.org are all about: Israeli Jews who share the gospel with our own brothers and sisters in a relevant way via media."

Regular excursions exploring Biblical Archaeology, Geography of the Bible, Cultural and Historical Background of the New Testament, and History and Theology of Modern Israel are scheduled for the students around the country of Israel, as part of their studies and recreation. Additionally, ICB Tours has been developed to provide study tours for Christians wanting to visit Israel in the context of academic Bible study. Tours are led by "professional, Messianic guides".

The college partners with local authorities in distributing food to the poor and elderly in the city.

== Opposition within Israel ==
The leading anti-missionary organization, Yad L'Achim, declared the college to be at the "forefront of missionary activity in Israel". Rabbi Tzvi Wilhelm, rabbi of the Chabad synagogue north of Netanya, objected to the establishment of the Israel College in Netanya, criticized Jesus for rejecting Jewish religious law (Halakha), and termed the college's subject matter "idolatry". Rabbi Irwin Birnbaum, a former Conservative rabbi in Netanya, considers the activities of Christian proselytizers in Israel to be "worse than the Nazis", and believes they are set on destroying Judaism spiritually rather than physically.
