= Mar Thoma Syrian Theological Seminary, Kottayam =

Coordinates: 9°35′32″N 76°31′53″E

Mar Thoma Syrian Theological Seminary
- Motto: Lighted to Lighten
- Established: July 3, 1926
- Religious affiliation: Mar Thoma Syrian Church
- Academic affiliation: Senate of Serampore College
- Principal: Rev. Dr. M.C. Thomas
- Location: Kottayam, India
- Website: marthomatheologicalseminary.org

The Mar Thoma Syrian Theological Seminary is an Oriental Protestant Seminary, established in 1926 in Kottayam, Kerala, to train clergy for the Mar Thoma Syrian Church. The seminary has been affiliated with Senate of Serampore College (University). It introduced postgraduate studies in 1980 and became a doctoral research center in 1999.

== History ==
The need for a dedicated seminary was strongly felt by the Mar Thoma Church, leading to a collective desire to establish the institution in Kottayam. Under the leadership of Thazhathu Chandapilla Kathanaar, land on Zion Hill was purchased. This location was significant as it was where Thomas Mar Athanasius spent the night after being expelled from the Old Seminary. The foundation stone for the "Mar Thoma Syrian Seminary" was laid on May 5, 1896, during the tenure of Metropolitan Titus I. However, financial constraints delayed the construction, and it was only in 1921 that the Samudaya Alochana Sabha formally decided to establish a seminary. Despite initial challenges, funds were raised through individual contributions and memorial donations, allowing the inauguration of the "Mar Thoma Syrian Vaidika Seminary" on July 3, 1926, at Zion Hill, Kottayam. This event, which coincided with St. Thomas Day, was a major milestone in the history of the Mar Thoma Church.

The seminary was affiliated with Senate of Serampore College (University) from its inception, initially offering courses leading to a Diploma in Licentiate in Theology (L.Th). In 1970, the institution upgraded its curriculum to offer a Bachelor of Theology (B.Th) degree. Several eminent church leaders played a key role in its development, including Most Rev. Dr. Juhanon Mar Thoma, Rt. Rev. Thomas Mar Athanasius, Rt. Rev. Dr. Philipose Mar Chrysostom, Rev. K.P. Philip, Rev. Dr. T.C. Thomas, and Rev. C.V. John.

In 1974, the seminary further advanced its academic standing by introducing the Bachelor of Divinity (B.D.) degree with English as the medium of instruction.

Postgraduate studies were introduced in 1980 as part of an ecumenical initiative between three major seminaries in Kerala: the Orthodox Theological Seminary, Kottayam, the Mar Thoma Theological Seminary, and the Kerala United Theological Seminary. This collaborative effort, known as the Federated Faculty for Research in Religion and Culture (FFRRC), aimed to provide quality higher education in biblical studies and theology at an affordable cost.

In 1999, the FFRRC was recognized as a doctoral research center, offering Master of Theology (M.Th) and Doctor of Theology (D.Th) degrees in subjects such as Old Testament, New Testament, Christian Theology, Christian Ministry, Religions, Church History, and Liturgical Studies. The initiative has grown into a premier postgraduate center under the Senate of Serampore College.

The Mar Thoma Theological Seminary maintains strong ecumenical relationships with various churches and theological institutions in India and abroad. The seminary has also engaged in student exchange programs with Princeton Theological Seminary, Bishop's College, Calcutta, Gurukul Lutheran Theological College, and Eastern Theological Seminary (Jorhat), among others.

In 2001, the seminary celebrated its Platinum Jubilee, hosting Senate Board meetings, convocation ceremonies, and other events. A commemorative book, Ministry and Spirituality, was published to mark the occasion. The seminary continues to celebrate its legacy, recently observing its 90th anniversary (Navathy).

The current principal is Rev. Dr. M.C. Thomas who succeeded Rev. Dr. V.S. Varughese, he was appointed in February 2025 by the Mar Thoma Church.

== Affiliation ==
The Seminary has been affiliated with the Senate of Serampore College (University) since its inception. Initially, the seminary offered the Licentiate in Theology (L.Th) program to train clergy for the Mar Thoma Church. In 1970, it upgraded to offering a Bachelor of Theology (B.Th) degree, followed by the Bachelor of Divinity (B.D) in 1974, with English as the medium of instruction. In 1980, postgraduate studies (M.Th) were introduced through an ecumenical collaboration with other seminaries in Kerala under the Federated Faculty for Research in Religion and Culture (FFRRC). The seminary became a doctoral research center in 1999, offering M.Th and D.Th degrees under the Senate of Serampore College, making it a key institution for theological education in India.
