= South Asia Institute of Advanced Christian Studies =

Christian theological Institute in Bangalore, India

South Asia Institute of Advanced Christian Studies (SAIACS)
- Motto: Excellence For Service
- Type: Theological Research Institute
- Established: 1981; 45 years ago
- Founder: Graham Houghton
- Academic affiliations: Asia Theological Association; University of Mysore
- Principal: Dr. Varughese John
- Dean: Dr. Joshua George
- Location: Bengaluru, Karnataka, India
- Website: https://www.saiacs.org/

The South Asia Institute of Advanced Christian Studies (SAIACS /ˈsaɪæks/) is a theological research institute in Bangalore, India, affiliated with the University of Mysore and accredited by Asia Theological Association.

== History ==
SAIACS was founded in 1982, by Dr Graham Houghton and fellow New Zealander, Bruce Nicholls. Initially, the college offered a two-year Master of Theology (MTh) programme in Missiology which was offered under the umbrella of the Association of Evangelical Theological Education in India (AETEI), in partnership with Madras Bible Seminary in Chennai (formerly, Madras). In the year 1983 the programme was moved permanently to Bangalore and sought and received accreditation from Asia Theological Association (ATA) under its own name.

SAIACS offers degrees within several specialisations accommodating more than 100 students on campus each year. SAIACS has one of the largest theological library in India with thousands of volumes. SAIACS is now a largely residential research institute and offers postgraduate degree programmes for an MA, MDiv, MTh, Doctor of Ministry (DMin), and Doctor of Philosophy (PhD). Currently there are seven departmental specialisations being offered at SAIACS; namely Biblical Studies (BS), New Testament (NT), Old Testament (OT), Theology and History (TH), Intercultural and Religious Studies, Pastoral Theology and Counselling (PTC) and Church History.

== Theology ==
SAIACS is historically known for its emphasis on Protestant theology.

== Leadership ==
Succession of Principal at SAIACS, Bangalore

Principals

- 1982 - 2004: Graham Houghton, Ph.D. (UCLA)
- 2004 - 2006: Ashish Chrispal, Ph.D. (University of Aberdeen)
- 2006 - 2008: F. Hrangkhuma, Ph.D. (Fuller Theological Seminary)
- 2008 - 2018: Ian Payne, Ph.D. (University of Aberdeen)
- 2018 - 2025: Prabhu Singh, Ph.D. (Asbury Theological Seminary)
- 2025 (Interim): Asish Thomas Koshy, D.Th. (Serampore)
- 2025 - Present: Varughese John, Ph.D. (University of Madras)

Dr Graham Houghton served as the founding Principal of the South Asia Institute of Advanced Christian Studies (SAIACS) and subsequently held the title of Principal Emeritus until his passing.

In 2004, Dr Ashish Chrispal succeeded him as Principal. He was followed by Dr F. Hrangkhuma, who served from 2006 to 2008. Dr Ian Payne from New Zealand, held the position from 2008 to 2018. Dr Prabhu Singh served as Principal from 2018 to 2025.

In May 2024, the chairman of the SAIACS board of trustees announced that Prabhu Singh would be stepping down from his role as principal before completing his second term and would leave SAIACS. He subsequently went on a sabbatical for the 2024 academic year.

In April 2025, the board entrusted Dr Asish Thomas Koshy, a Johanian scholar in the Department of Biblical Studies, with the responsibility of leading SAIACS as its interim principal.

From June 2025 onwards, the board appointed systematic theologian, and philosopher, Dr Varughese John, as the next principal of SAIACS. Dr Varughese John, a priest with the St. Thomas Evangelical Church of India (STECI), has been a faculty member in the Department of Theology at SAIACS since 2011.

== Location ==
SAIACS main campus is located in Kothanur, North Bangalore, in the state of Karnataka, India. Its Mysore campus is located in 1st Phase, Kuvempunagar, Mysuru, in the state of Karnataka, India.

== Accreditation and partnership ==
SAIACS degrees are accredited by Asia Theological Association.

In June 1997, SAIACS was recognized by the University of Mysore as an accredited research institution of the university where students can enroll for a PhD program under University of Mysore.

In June 2011, the University of Mysore further recognized SAIACS as a Centre for Specialized Studies to offer MA in Theology where students can graduate with MA degree from the University of Mysore after writing Mysore University examination.

Similarly, in June 2012, the MPhil programme, which is identical to the MTh programme, was recognised by the University of Mysore.

In May 2015, SAIACS and Laidlaw College (Auckland, New Zealand) signed a Memorandum of Understanding to foster collaboration. This includes exchanging doctoral students, mentoring doctoral work, facilitating faculty sabbaticals at both institutions, and granting SAIACS access to Laidlaw’s library resources.

In June 2022, a Memorandum of Understanding (MoU) was signed by Asbury Theological Seminary to offer the Doctor of Ministry degree, focusing on leadership in ministry where students can graduate with a DMin from Asbury Seminary.

== Academic programs ==
SAIACS offers residential degree programs under ATA for

- Masters of Arts in Theological Studies, MA (TS)
- Masters of Arts in Theology, MA (Th)
- Masters of Arts in Worship and Music, MA (WM)
- Master of Divinity, MDiv
- Master of Theology, MTh
- Integrated MTh
- Post Graduation Diploma in Biblical Languages, PGDip (BL)
- Doctor of Philosophy (PhD),
- and a non-residential Doctor of Ministry (DMin).

The residency requirement for the MA and the MTh programs is two academic years. This period may be extended where equivalency course requirements are added to a student's MTh program. Doctoral programs involve longer periods.

In addition SAIACS also provides ATA accredited MA and MDiv in online mode.

== Students ==
Majority of students to SAIACS come from the neighboring states of Tamil Nadu, Telangana, Andhra Pradesh and different parts of Northeast India. Some of the students are sent by their organisation and are already under appointment to continue their service upon completion of their studies at SAIACS. Many students have served as theological teachers or Christian workers in Asia. SAIACS also has graduates from countries such as Australia, Bhutan, Brazil, Canada, China, Guatemala, Hong Kong, Indonesia, Kenya, Korea, Malaysia, Mauritius, Nepal, New Zealand, Nigeria, Sri Lanka, Sudan, Thailand, and USA.

== SAIACS Press ==
SAIACS Publications is the publishing arm of the South Asia Institute of Advanced Christian Studies. SAIACS Press is an imprint that publishes relevant, creative, and culturally sensitive research that resources the church and society in the area of theology and ministry. SAIACS Publications also partner with other foreign publishing houses to bring select titles to South Asia at an affordable price.

== SAIACS CEO Centre ==
In 2005, the Continuing Education Opportunities Centre (or CEO Centre) was started at SAIACS with the aim to generate scholarships for deserving SAIACS students. The CEO Centre is a premium conference centre and management training site, built right next to SAIACS.
