= Pentecostal Theological Seminary, Kottayam =

Coordinates: 9°33′50″N 76°33′53″E

- Kottayam Theological Seminary
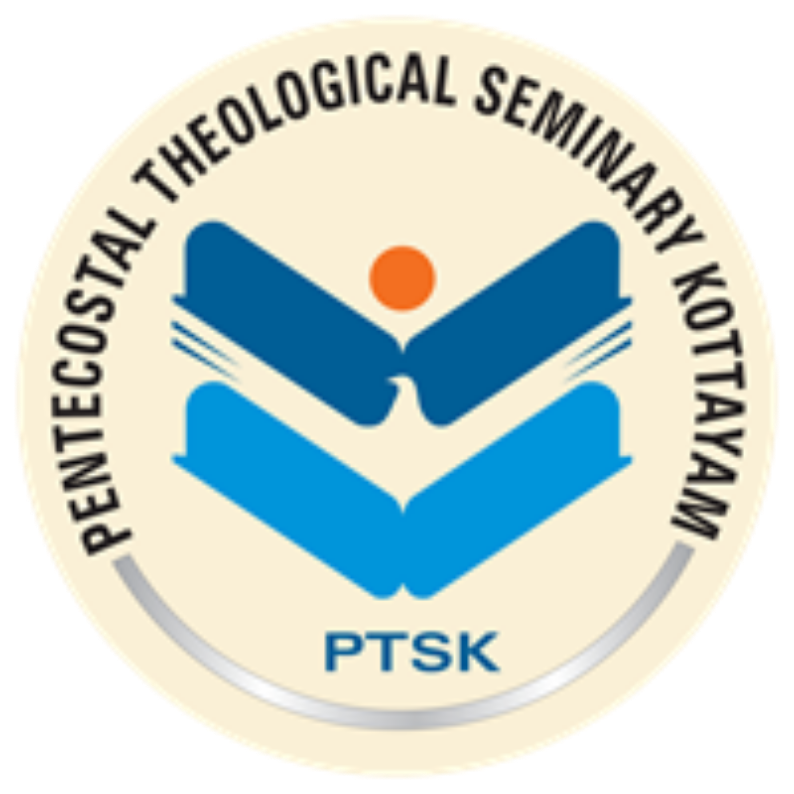
- Other names: Kottayam Theological Seminary, IPC Theological Seminary, Kottayam
- Motto: "A workman that needeth not to be ashamed"
- Type: Seminary
- Established: 2001
- Religious affiliation: Indian Pentecostal Church of God
- Academic affiliations: Asia Theological Association
- Principal: Dr Abey Peter
- Location: Puthuppally, Kottayam, Kerala, India
- Campus: Suburban
- Website: http://ipcseminary.com/

Pentecostal Theological Seminary, Kottayam formerly IPC Theological Seminary, Kottayam (IPCTSK) also known as the Kottayam Theological Seminary, is a Pentecostal theological seminary situated in, Kottayam, Kerala, India. It provides undergraduate and postgraduate theological education in residential, distance and online modes, and operates under the auspices of the IPC Educational & Welfare Society in connection with the Indian Pentecostal Church of God.

== History ==
The seminary was established in the early 2000s by leaders associated with the Indian Pentecostal Church of God and allied organisations. The seminary is administered by the IPC Educational & Welfare Society (IPCEWS), which represents churches and individuals connected with the IPC church. Governance is exercised through an administrative council and an academic senate composed of church leaders and theological educators. Dr. Idicheria Ninan, a New Testament scholar served as its founding principal. IPCTSK is listed in regional and national theological directories and appears in the Asia Theological Association's institutional index. The campus is located in Puthuppally, Kottayam, and includes classrooms, a library, chapel, staff quarters and student residences. Campus life is structured around worship, spiritual formation and practical ministry engagement.

== Academic programmes ==
The seminary offers a range of academic programmes, including:

- Bachelor of Theology (B.Th.) – residential
- Master of Divinity (M.Div.) – residential, distance and online
- Master of Arts in Theological Studies – online
- Certificate-level courses (e.g. Certificate in Ministry; LEAD Institute short courses)
- Advanced and doctoral studies (e.g. Doctor of Ministry, D.Min.)

The curriculum emphasises biblical studies, missiology, pastoral formation, Pentecostal spirituality and leadership, with a stated institutional commitment to equipping students for Christian ministry and church planting.

== Accreditation and recognition ==
The seminary is accredited by the Asia Theological Association and by the General Presbytery and the General Council of the Indian Pentecostal Church of God.

== See also ==
- Indian Pentecostal Church of God
- Christian seminaries and theological institutions in India
