= Vidyajyoti College of Theology =

Theological college in Delhi

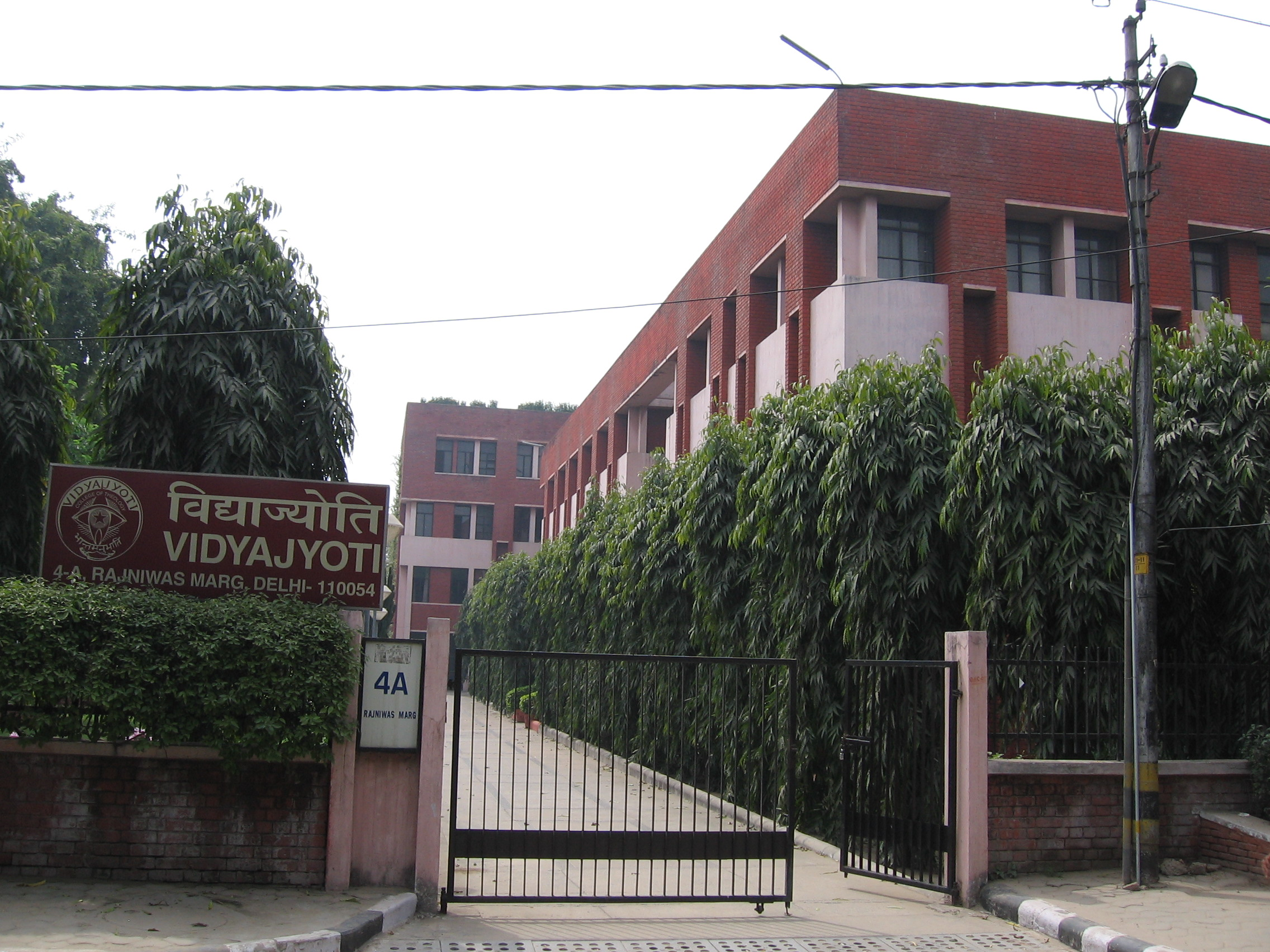
- Vidyajyoti College, at Civil Lines Campus, Delhi
- Type: Private theological college
- Established: 1879; 147 years ago
- Founders: Jesuits
- Affiliations: Congregation for Catholic Education (Rome)
- Religious affiliation: Jesuits
- Chancellor: Rev. Fr. Arturo Sosa SJ
- Rector: Fr. Nirmal Raj SJ
- Principal: Dr. Fr. Rajakumar Joseph SJ
- Academic staff: 15
- Students: 175
- Undergraduates: 160
- Postgraduates: 10
- Doctoral students: 5
- Location: Delhi, India; 28.6725°N 77.2215°E
- Campus: Urban
- Website: vidyajyoticollege.in

Vidyajyoti College of Theology (literally, ‘Light of Knowledge’) is a Catholic private theological college run by the Jesuits located in Delhi, India. It was founded in 1879 in Asansol, West Bengal, as 'Saint Joseph’s Seminary'. From 1889 to 1971 it developed in the mountains of Kurseong, near Darjeeling, where it was renamed Saint Mary’s College. From 1972 onwards it has flourished in the neighbourhood of the University of Delhi.

Vidyajyoti confers the Degrees of Bachelor of Theology (Th.B.), Master of Theology (Th.M.), and Doctor of Theology (Th.D.). It also admits students for certificate courses for one or two years and diploma courses for three years.

== History ==
Vidyajyoti College of Theology is one of the oldest institutions of learning run by the Jesuits in India. It started in Asansol (West Bengal) in 1881, as a house for training in philosophy and theology for expatriate young European missionaries that at that time volunteered for service in India (among whom was the apostle of Chotanagpur, Constant Lievens) and came to the country without having yet done the years of study required for the priesthood.

In 1889, the Seminary, as it was then called, was transferred to hills of the Himalayas, in Kurseong (Darjeeling District), about 1800 metres above sea level, where for 82 years grew into an important centre of research and teaching of Indian religions and Christian theology, open to Indian and foreign Jesuits working in South Asia.

In 1932, the Holy See recognized it as a Faculty of Theology directly under its Congregation for Education, authorized to offer degrees of Licentiate and Doctorate in theology recognized in the Catholic Church.

In 1972, the St Mary's College, as it was then called, was transferred to Delhi where it took the name of Vidyajyoti College. It also opened its doors to any duly qualified students interested in the subjects it offers. As a result of a restructuring of its academic programme from 1978 the College opened extension centres in various parts of the country. At present, the faculty has five such extension centres in Chennai, Patna, Ranchi, Shantiniketan (West-Bengal) and Varanasi. Students do part of their courses in these centres and complete them in the national centre in Delhi.

On the 4 June 2016 the college opened a regional campus in Kuala Lumpur.

== Objectives ==
The Faculty aims at: personal religious and human growth of its members research and publication in the areas of religion, religious history, theology, Indian traditions, sociology of religion, and allied subjects teaching courses of theology at the levels of B.Th. and M.Th. and at doctoral research fostering and participating in ecumenical discourse and interreligious dialogue being involved in movements of the people aiming at their liberation from the clutches of poverty, oppression and marginalization.

== Faculty ==
Vidyajyoti College has a residential faculty consisting largely of Jesuits coming from all parts of India and from diverse cultural backgrounds. This diversity is enriched with the presence and support of ‘visiting lecturers’.

The Faculty is governed by the Academic Council, which consists of: (a) All Professors, Readers, Lecturers and Tutors who are permanent members of the Staff; (b) The Rector of Vidyajyoti; (c) The Registrar; (d) Associate and Visiting teachers during their stay at the centre; (e) Three representatives of the B.Th. students as well as one representative of the postgraduate students for matters especially concerning the order of studies and other matters affecting the academic life and interests of the students. If there is no woman representative among those elected, the Principal in consultation with Executive Council will nominate one. The students of each Regional Centre elect one representative. The Treasurer, Administrator and Librarian, unless they are otherwise members of the Council, may be called whenever found opportune.

== Students ==
Vidyajyoti currently has 305 students on its rolls studying at its college in Delhi and its RTCs (regional theology centres). The students are university graduates or postgraduates belonging to some 70 religious congregations, dioceses, secular institutes and lay associations from every part of India and abroad. Although most of the students belong to the Indian subcontinent, there are a few from abroad, as well. While the medium of education is English, Hindi is mostly used for fieldwork.

=== Extension Services ===
Besides the extracurricular activities of the college, Vidyajyoti’s students offer Extension Services to other academic institutions in Delhi and elsewhere. Groups of students offer their services for conducting self-awareness, personality development, faith formation and social awareness seminars and weekends for students of other colleges and schools. Seminars are also conducted for teachers in various schools and colleges so as to improve teacher-student relationships. The Vidyajyoti students also network with socially committed groups in organizing interfaith initiatives, highlighting social problems and dialoguing on religio-social concerns that affect life in India.

=== Contextual Ministries ===
Fieldwork is an integral part of the Vidyajyoti curriculum. Every student is required to opt for and be committed to some form of fieldwork since the faculty considers guided socio-pastoral involvement as an essential dimension of doing contextual theology. Each student is put into direct contact with a specific community, especially the marginalized ones to gain direct experience of the negativities of life and the suffering of the poor. This context then becomes a locus theologicus — a site for a deepening reflection on the Christian faith and other faiths, as well.

Apart from these regular ministries, orientation programs and spiritual guidance in various schools and parishes are also conducted in and around Delhi for teachers, students and youth. Students are also involved in SAMAG (Social and Media Action Group) that creates awareness among the students of Vidyajyoti on issues of injustice, violation of human rights, exploitation of women, decisions that affect the Dalits, tribals and children. SAMAG also takes initiative to organize and collaborate with other NGOs and agencies fighting for the rights of the oppressed and marginalized in the form of dharna and protests.

For their pastoral and social ministries the students visit those in prison (Tihal Jail), in hospitals and homes run by the Missionaries of Charity. They organize activities and tuitions for slum, railway stations and neighbourhood children (Bal mela). Some are involved in organizing religious services in Delhi parishes and give guidances to spiritual and youth groups (Small Christian communities, Youth catholic associations, etc.). They help also marginal groups into organizing themselves into self-help units: domestic workers from the tribal areas, rickshaw pullers (Asha ki kiran), etc.

== Resources ==
=== Library ===
The library holds nearly 130,000 volumes and has more than 300 reviews. Most of the library has been computerized and the students have access to three points of entry into the computer and to the stacks of the library. The library is particularly rich in the fields of Biblical studies, systematic and pastoral theology, spirituality, Hinduism and Indian culture and Islamics.

The library has a few hundreds of ancient publications, some of them from the 16th to the 19th century. Its oldest book was printed in 1514, a Latin commentary on the Book of Sentences of Peter Lombard, which was almost a kind of text book of theology in the 16th century university of Paris. The library has also a precious manuscript of a Tamil-French dictionary composed in the 18th century, one of the earliest monuments of Tamil lexicography.

The library is open to research scholars and staff of Jawaharlal Nehru University, the University of Delhi, Jamia Millia Islamia and other scholars from India and abroad.

== Publications ==
Theological research being one of the aims of the Vidyajyoti faculty, it endeavours to publish the results of the research of its teachers and students.

Some of Vidyajyoti’s publications are: Vidyajyoti Journal of Theological Research, Ave, Vachan Sudha and Tattvaviveka.

The Vidyajyoti Journal of Theological Research [VJTR], a monthly journal, reaches nearly 4000 subscribers all over the world, including most theological colleges of English-speaking countries. It covers areas of Christian theology and service, inter-religious dialogue, Indian theology, social concerns, and trends significant for religion in the modern times. The Journal was started in 1938 with the title The Clergy Monthly. In 1975 it assumed the present title. It opens its pages to scholars from all over India that want to publish in the areas of concern for the journal.

== See also ==
- List of Jesuit educational institutions
- Christian seminaries and theological colleges in India
