= Theophilos Kuriakose =

20th and 21st-century Syriac Orthodox Church bishop

His Grace Mor Dr. Theophilose Kuriakose
- Metropolitan of Thiruvananthapuram; Patriarchal Vicar to Germany
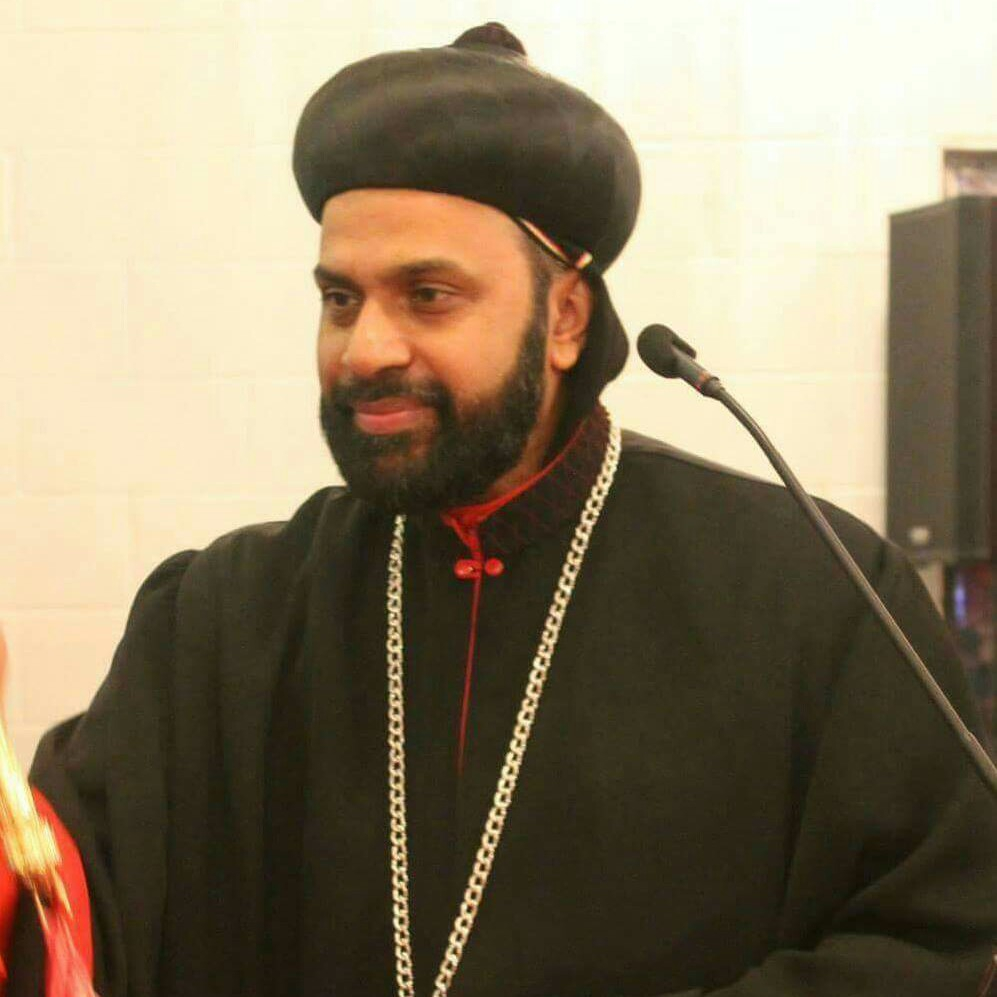
- Church: Syriac Orthodox Church
- See: Thiruvananthapuram, Germany
- Installed: 2003
- Other post: Resident Metropolitan of MSOT Seminary

Orders
- Ordination: 1989 as Deacon
- Consecration: 2003 as Metropolitan

Personal details
- Born: 1 February 1966 (age 60) Ooramana, Ernakulam, India
- Denomination: Oriental Orthodox
- Parents: Cherian Varkey; Sarama Varkey
- Education: University of Regensburg, Germany

Mor Theophilos Kuriakose is a Syriac Orthodox bishop of the Jacobite Syrian Christian. He currently serves as the Metropolitan of Thiruvananthapuram and the Patriarchal Vicar to Germany of the Malankara Syriac Orthodox Church. He has also been the Principal of Malankara Syrian Orthodox Theological Seminary, Udayagiri since 2013.

== Life ==
Kuriakose was born on 1 February 1966 in the Kodikuthiyil family of the Ooramana village (Ernakulum District, Kerala, India) to Mr. Cherian Varkey and Mrs. Saramma Varkey. His home parish is St. George Thabore Syrian Orthodox Church, Ooramana in the Kandanad Diocese.

He did his schooling in Ooramana High School and graduation (B.A. Political Science) in St.Peter's College, Kolenchery. In 1990, he completed B.Th. from the Malankara Syrian Orthodox Theological Seminary, Udayagiri. He was ordained as a Deacon by Mor Gregorious Geevarghese Metropolitan in 1989.

He later joined United Theological College in Bangalore for the degree of Bachelor in Divinity, which he completed in 1993. Afterwards he served as a lecturer in the Malankara Syrian Orthodox Theological Seminary, Mulanthuruthy (Ernakulam District) for around three years (1993-1995). Concurrently he functioned as the Organizing Secretary of the ‘Syrian Orthodox Christian Student Movement’. In 1995 he went to Germany for higher studies. In Germany he mastered in German and Latin languages from the Ostkirchliches Institute, and also received Doctor of Theology at the Catholic Faculty of the University of Regensburg. His thesis was on "Den Armen gehoert das Reich Gotttes. Lukanische Impulse fuer ein Dalit Theologie". In 2002 he returned to India and continued as a lecturer of the M.S.O.T Seminary.

On 12 November 2002 he was ordained as a priest, and on 29 September 2003 he was consecrated as a Metropolitan by Aboon Mor Baselios Thomas I. Since then he served as the Resident Metropolitan of M.S.O.T. Seminary, and had various other responsibilities in the church.

Responsibilities: Resident Metropolitan and Professor of the Malankara Syrian Orthodox Theological Seminary, India. Metropolitan and Patriarchal Vicar of the Malankara Syrian Orthodox church in Europe( Except UK & Ireland. President of the Ecumenical Office of the Malankara Syrian Orthodox Church. Chairman of the Media Cell of the Malankara Syrian Orthodox Church. Co-Chairman of the Catholic-Malankara Syrian Orthodox churches International Joint commission for Theological dialogue. Member of the Faith and Order Commission of the WCC. Member of the International Joint Commission for Theological Dialogue between Catholic and Oriental Orthodox churches. Member of the program committee of the Christian Conference of Asia. Central Committee member of the World Religions Forum Macedonia. Member of the Pro Oriente Forum Syriacum and Forum Colloquium, Vienna. Central Committee member of the International Ecumenical Bishops Conference of Fokolare Movement Italy. Visiting professor of universities in Europe and US.
