= Southern Asia Bible College =

Bible college in Bangalore, India

Southern Asia Bible College (SABC) is a Bible college of the Assemblies of God in Bangalore, India.

== History ==
Established in 1951, SABC is a theological training institution of the Assemblies of God in Southern Asia. It was founded by Alfred Cawston as 'Southern Asia Bible Institute' with a vision to prepare men and women for the work of Christian ministry in Southern Asia. Today it has grown to be one of the largest theological institutions in Asia with over 300 students. More than 2500 alumni of SABC serve in various ministries throughout Southern Asia and other nations of the world.

SABC operates under the leadership of the Board of Directors of Assemblies of God in Southern Asia, which consists of leaders representing the Assemblies of God constituencies in Southern Asia and the Assemblies of God World Mission. Southern Asia Bible College is an active member of The Evangelical Fellowship of India (EFI), The Asia Theological Association (ATA) and The Assemblies of God Association for Theological Education in Southern Asia (AGATESA).

== Alumni ==
Its former Principal/President Dr. A.C. George is one of the first among the Pentecostal leaders in India with a Ph.D. Other SABC graduates include Dr. Ivan Satyavrata, the senior pastor of the Assembly of God Church in Kolkata, Dr. D. Mohan, senior pastor of the New Life Assembly of God Church in Chennai, and Rev. Paul Thangiah, the senior pastor of the Full Gospel Assembly of God Church in Bangalore.

A large percentage of the graduates of Southern Asia Bible are engaged in Christian ministry. A smaller percentage have continued in secular work, in fields such as journalism, social work, hospital work, teaching and administration. Many of its students have also pioneered Christian works all across the globe. Much of The Assemblies of God leadership in India has been trained at SABC.

== Campus ==
The present campus in Kothanur was established by Rev. Dr. Andrew McDearmid, one of the last American missionary principals of SABC. It is a 21-acre (85,000 m^{2}) campus in Bangalore city. There is a residential facility for 150 single men, 50 single women and 12 apartments for married students. There is also an adequate number of lecture halls, a large auditorium for community functions, a multi-media conference facility, a chapel for times of corporate worship, a multi-purpose games field and sports room, a spacious cafeteria, residences for faculty and staff, and a guest-house. The majority of these buildings have been added since the first students and staff transferred to the "new campus" in the summer of 1970. The college serves a community of about 270 students. Over 25 staff and 15 faculty members work at the college under Rev. Pravinkumar Israel, president of the college since April 2006.

== Programs Offered ==
SABC offers the following programs:

- Doctor of Ministry (D.Min.), an online in-service program designed for those who have completed an M.Div. program and are serving in leadership capacities in the Christian service.
- Master of Divinity (M.Div.), a three-year (six semesters) degree program designed for graduates of recognized Universities.
- Master of Arts in Christian Studies (M.A.C.S.), a two-year (four semesters) degree program for graduates of recognized Universities.
- Diploma in Christian Ministry, a one-year (two-semester) diploma program designed for mature candidates involved in Christian Ministry.

The Distance Learning Department of SABC is presently called the Global School of Open Learning and offers Diploma in Theology (Dip.Th.), Bachelor of Theology (B.Th.), and Master of Divinity programs by distance learning and eLearning.

All the programs are accredited by The Asia Theological Association (ATA).

== The Cawston Learning Resource Centre ==
The CLRC, a modern computerized learning resource facility, with more than 40,000 volumes of books, periodicals, and other audio-visual resources has enhanced the learning facility. The Mission Resource Center and the Pentecostal Study Center in the CLRC cater to specific interest groups in training.
