= Faith Baptist Bible College and Seminary =

- Motto: Preparing God's servants for God's work for this and the next generation
- Type: Bible college and seminary
- Established: 1997; 29 years ago
- President: Dr. Sambhu Nath De
- Faculty: 15
- Students: 100
- Location: Iringole, Ernakulam,, Kerala, India
- Website: www.fbbcindia.org

Faith Baptist Bible College and Seminary is an undergraduate and graduate Bible college located in Kochi, Kerala, India.

== History ==
Faith Baptist Bible College was established on July 1, 1997 by Dr. Sambhu Nath De.

== College programs ==
- Bachelor of Theology (3 or 4 years course - B.Th.)
- Bachelor of Ministry (3 or 4 years course - B.Min.)
- Bachelor of Religious Education (3 or 4 years course - B.R.E.)
- Master of Divinity (2 or 3 years course - M.Div.)
- Master of Ministry (2 years course - M.Min)
- Master of Religious Education (2 years course - M.R.E.)
- Master of Theology (1 or 2 years course - Th.M.)

== Accreditation ==
Faith Baptist Bible College and Seminary is an accredited by Association of Baptist Bible Colleges & Seminaries in India.
