= St. Thomas Orthodox Theological Seminary, Nagpur =

St. Thomas Orthodox Theological Seminary is a seminary of the Malankara Orthodox Syrian Church in Nagpur, India.

== History ==
=== Launching of the seminary ===
The Old Seminary at Kottayam, founded in 1815, contributed much to the development of the Malankara Orthodox Syrian Church. The leadership of the Church considered that a new theological institution should be started in the multi-religious context of India. This was brought to the attention of the Holy Episcopal Synod of 5–9 July 1994. It appointed a sub-committee consisting of six bishops to study the case. The sub-committee presented a report in the Synod of February 1995, and the latter decided to establish a seminary in North India.

The Holy Episcopal Synod accepted the offer of Stephanos Mar Theodosius, the Bishop of Calcutta Diocese, to use the infrastructure of his diocesan centre, and the inception of the seminary occurred on 14 September 1995 in the St. Thomas Ashram at Bhilai. In the July Synod of 1996, the Bhilai Seminary was given autonomous status and named the St. Thomas Orthodox Theological Seminary. On 25 September 1996, the seminary was officially inaugurated by Geevarghese Mar Osthathios, the President of the Mission Board of the Malankara Church, in the presence of Stephanus Mar Theodosius and Geevarghese Mar Ivanius (Kottayam).

=== From Bhilai to Nagpur ===
However, the Church purchased 15 acres (61,000 m^{2}) of land in Kalmeshwar, a village 25 kilometres (16 mi) away from the city of Nagpur, as a permanent site for the seminary. Nagpur was chosen because of its location in the centre of India and its proximity to all four dioceses outside Kerala. Moran Mar Baselious Mar Thoma Mathews II laid the foundation stone for the new seminary building in Kalmeshwar on 10 December 1997. The seminary functioned in Bhilai until the summer of 1999 under the leadership of Bishop Theodosius.

On 7 July 1999, the seminary was shifted to Nagpur. Fr. Reji Mathew was appointed as the new principal. Since the basic infrastructure was not yet ready at Kalmeshwar, the seminary employed the halls and parsonage of St. George Orthodox Church, Nagpur during the summer semester. On 9 November 1999, the faculty and students shifted their residence to Kalmeshwar. Thomas Mar Thimotheus, the Catholicose Designate, inaugurated the new hostel in the presence of Mar Theodosius, Thomas Mar Athanasius (Chengannur) and Geevarghese Mar Coorilose (Mumbai).

The seminary is situated in the middle of the 15 acres (61,000 m^{2}). There is a small farm maintained by the staff and students which provides part of their daily bread. When finished, the seminary building was to have 80 rooms in two wings on two floors, and might look like a butterfly in the end.

Stephanus Mar Theodosius laid the foundation stone of the seminary chapel on 29 October 2002. The main expense of the chapel was sponsored by St. Thomas Church Dubai. The construction was to be completed by February 2004. It was planned for Moran Mar Baselius Mar Thoma Mathews II to consecrate the chapel on 19 February 2004 with the assistance of Mar Osthathios, Mar Theodosius and Mar Coorilos.

=== Degrees & Accreditation ===
Saint Thomas Orthodox Theological Seminary (STOTS) is Affiliated to Senate of Serampore College (University). The Seminary offers a Bachelor of Divinity (B.D.), a Graduate in Sacred Theology (G.S.T.), and an online Diploma in Orthodox Christian Studies. As the G.S.T. is a ministerial degree, it is only available to male students.

As of 2020, Father Dr Jossi Jacob is the Principal of the college.

== Milestones ==
- July 1995 - Decision of the synod to build a seminary in North India
- 14 September 1995 - Inception of the seminary at Bhilai
- 19 October 1995 - Inauguration of Bhilai Seminary
- July 1996 - The synod confers autonomous status to Bhilai Seminary
- 10 December 1997 - Laying of foundation stone at Nagpur
- 7 July 1999 - Shift of the seminary from Bhilai to Nagpur Church
- 7 December 1999 - Inauguration of the STOTS hostel at Kalmeshwar
- 10 October 2002 - Visit of Serampore Commission
- 29 October 2002 - Laying of the foundation stone of the seminary chapel
- February 2003 - Serampore Senate affiliates the seminary
- 18 February 2004 - First convocation
- 19 February 2004 - Consecration of the Seminary Chapel
- 1 July 2008 - First girl student Ms. Cincy Mariyamma Joseph joins the seminary
- 7 October 2009 - Second Convocation
- 5 April 2011 - Consecration of the family quarters
- 9 November 2012 - Foundation stone lying of Upasana Building
- 18 September 2013 - Consecration of the Upasana Centre
- 18 September 2013 - Third Convocation
- 4 February 4, 2014 - Inauguration of first 'Online Theological Study - SATHYAJYOTHI' of the church.

== See also ==
- Orthodox Theological Seminary, Kottayam
- Malankara Orthodox Syrian Church
