= St. Joseph's Seminary (Mangalore) =

St Joseph's Seminary
- Motto: As each has received a gift, use it to serve one another, as good stewards of God's varied grace.
- Type: Major Seminary
- Established: 1763; 263 years ago
- Affiliations: Theology – Pontifical Urban University, Rome Philosophy – Dharmaram College, Bengaluru
- President: Most Rev. Dr Peter Paul Saldanha
- Rector: Fr Dr Rajesh Rosario
- Students: 135
- Location: Jeppu, Mangaluru, Karnataka, India; 12°51′40″N 74°51′17″E
- Campus: Urban
- Website: www.sjsmangalore.in

St Joseph's Inter-diocesan Seminary, Mangalore is a Jesuit seminary in Jeppu, Mangaluru. It was established by Fr Joachim Miranda in 1763, and reestablished by Msgr Nicholas Pagani in 1878.

== History ==
St Joseph's Interdiocesan Seminary, Mangalore by Fr. Joachim Miranda, a Goan Catholic priest, was first established in 1763 at Monte Mariano, some 13 km east of Mangalore town. However, during the captivity of Mangalorean Catholics under Tipu Sultan in 1784, the seminarians were dispersed or sent to Verapoly and for the next few decades, there is no record to show that a Seminary existed in Mangalore. However, in 1843, a certain Fr. Pius Noronha was said to have been the Rector of the Seminary at Monte Mariano. However, during the captivity of Mangalorean Catholics under Tipu Sultan in 1784, the Churches in South Canara were destroyed. For the few decades that followed, there is no record to show that a Seminary existed in South Canara.

The Jesuits took over from the Carmelites in 1878, and the very first act of the new Vicar Apostolic, Msgr Nicholas Pagani, was to reorganise the Seminary. Hence the present St Joseph's Seminary came into being on 11 January 1879. On 3 December 2009, St Joseph's Seminary "Seminary day", the seminary had reached an important milestone in that it had formed more than 1,930 priests in its history of 131 years. As of 2026, the seminary has completed 147 years from its existence and about 135 students are pursuing towards priesthood.
