= COTR Theological Seminary =

Coordinates: 17.890377°N 83.403979°E

Location
- Bheemili Rd, Bheemili, Visakhapatnam, Andhra Pradesh 531163; Bheemunipatnam; India

Information
- Type: Bible College
- Religious affiliation: Pentecostal
- Established: 1982; 44 years ago
- Founder: Dr. P.J. Titus
- Principal: Rev. Dr. Balu Savarikannu
- Gender: Co-Education
- Classes offered: Doctor of Philosophy, Master of Theology, Master of Divinity, Bachelor of Theology, Diploma in Theology
- Language: English, Hindi
- Campus: Urban
- Nickname: COTR
- Affiliation: Asia Theological Association International Council for Evangelical Theological Education

COTR Theological Seminary is an Evangelical - Pentecostal Seminary in Bheemunipatnam, India.

== History ==
The seminary was founded in 1982 by Dr. P.J. Titus.

== Affiliations and Accreditation ==
It is accredited by the Asia Theological Association, the National Association of Theological Accreditation International Council for Evangelical Theological Education in Zurich, Switzerland.
