= Indian Theological Seminary =

Indian Theological Seminary (ITS) is an interdenominational seminary situated in Chennai, Tamil Nadu, South India. It is affiliated to the Senate of Serampore College, Serampore, West Bengal. ITS is the missionary training arm of Gilgal Gospel Mission.

== Background ==
The Gilgal Gospel Mission trains men and women and sends them two by two into Hindu villages, with a view to them establishing friendships in the villages and starting Sunday Schools and later Churches. In order to train and equip these missionaries, Indian Theological Seminary (ITS) was founded in 1990.

ITS prepares three types of Church planters (a) bare foot evangelists (C.Th) (b) Bachelor of Theology (B.Th) (c) Master of Divinity (M.Div). Graduates who prepare at ITS fulfill the vision of "Preaching Christ and Planting Churches" in every village, town and city. Many return to their homes in the various parts of India to continue teaching, preaching, and planting churches.

== Courses offered ==
- Certificate of Theology (C.Th.)
- Bachelor of Theology (B.Th.) affiliated to the Senate of Serampore
- Master of Divinity (M.Div.) accredited by the Asia Theological Association(ATA)
