= Kaduthuruthy-Mannar =

- village
- Country: India
- State: Kerala
- District: Kottayam

Languages
  - Official: Malayalam, English
- Time zone: UTC+5:30 (IST)
- Vehicle registration: KL-5
- Coastline: 0 kilometres (0 mi)
- Nearest city: Kochi, Kottayam
- Literacy: 100%
- Lok Sabha constituency: Kottayam
- Climate: temperate (Köppen)
- Avg. summer temperature: 36 °C (97 °F)
- Avg. winter temperature: 30 °C (86 °F)

Kaduthuruthy-Mannar is a small village situated in the Kottayam district of the Kerala state, India. It is geographically located between Thalayolaparambu and Kaduthuruthy. In the 2011 census it had a population of 19,352 in 4722 households.

== Description ==
The southern side is surrounded by paddy fields and eastern side surrounded by the river and north and west is surrounded by hills.

In this small village, one can find church, mosque and temple. Ebenezer Bible College is on the hill side of Mannar.
