= Kerala United Theological Seminary =

- Latin: Uncta Theologica Seminarium Kerala
- Type: Seminary
- Established: 1943; 83 years ago
- Affiliations: Senate of Serampore College (University)
- Principal: Rev. Prof. Dr. C.I.David Joy
- Location: Thiruvananthapuram, India; 8°30′17″N 76°55′56″E
- Campus: Urban

Kerala United Theological Seminary (KUTS) is run by the Church of South India with an ecumenical outlook. It was founded in 1943, and is affiliated to the Senate of Serampore College (University), West Bengal. KUTS is located in Kannammoola in Thiruvananthapuram, Kerala. Now the seminary is run by six Dioceses in Kerala – Madhiya Kerala Diocese, East Kerala Diocese, Cochin Diocese, South Kerala Diocese, Kollam-Kottarakkara Diocese and Malabar Diocese.

== Courses offered ==
KUTS offers the degrees in following courses through the Senate of Serampore College.

- Integrated Bachelor of Divinity (I. B. D.)
- Bachelor of Divinity (B.Div.)
- Master of Ministry (M.Min.)
- Doctor of Ministry (D.Min.)

KUTS is also a participating member in the Federated Faculty for Research in Religion and Culture (FFRRC) through which it offers two post-graduate courses: Master of Theology (Th.M.) and Doctor of Theology (Th.D.).
