= Union Biblical Seminary =

Seminary in Pune, India

Coordinates: 18°28′37.8″N 73°51′51.6″E

Union Biblical Seminary, Pune
- Type: Seminary
- Established: 1953; 73 years ago
- Affiliation: Senate of Serampore College
- Principal: Dr.W.S.Annie
- President: Dr. Lal Pakhuongte
- Academic staff: 30+
- Location: Ramya Nagari Society, Bibvewadi, Pune, Maharashtra, India
- Website: http://www.ubs.ac.in/

Union Biblical Seminary (UBS) is a theological seminary founded by Wesleyan and Methodist denominations in Pune, India. UBS started as a Marathi-medium Bible School opened by the Free Methodist Church and was finally established in 1953 and initially located in Yavatmal, before relocating to Pune in 1983. It is affiliated with the Senate of Serampore College (University). It is the largest seminary under Wesleyan-Holiness movement in India. The seminary is famous for contextualising theology to Indian post-colonial context and in promoting New Perspective on Paul, Christian feminism or egalitarianism, Dalit theology and progressive Wesleyan viewpoint.

Union Biblical Seminary is founded by Union Biblical Seminary Association, a trust formed by various evangelical denominations in India. Union Biblical Seminary Association changed its name to Union Biblical Seminary Society in 2016. In accordance with laws in Maharashtra, it is also registered as a Trust in 2018. Dr. G. David Samuel serves as the President.

== Courses offered ==
The following are the courses offered by the Union Biblical Seminary

- Bachelor of Divinity (B.Div.)
- Master of Theology (Th.M.) in Old Testament, New Testament Theology, Ministry and Mission
- Doctor of Theology (Th.D.) in Old Testament, New Testament and Theology
- Bachelor of Theology (Th.B.) in Marathi, Hindi and English
- Master of Divinity (M.Div.) in Hindi and English
- Diploma in Counselling

== Publications ==
- UBS Journal, with three releases in a year.

== Library ==
The Seminary has a large library

== Notable alumni ==
- John Perumbalath, Bishop at Anglican Diocese of Liverpool
- Paulson Pulikottil, OT Scholar
- Johnson Thomaskutty, NT Scholar
- S. Anungla, Woman Pastor
- Prince G. Singh, Bishop at Episcopal Diocese of Rochester
