= Jan van der Watt =

South African theologian and biblical scholar (born in 1952)

Jan Gabriël Van der Watt (born 5 November 1953) is a scholar specialized in the New Testament and a Bible translator. He moved to the Netherlands from Pretoria, South Africa in 2009 to take up a chair in New Testament and source texts of early Christianity at Radboud University in Nijmegen. In 2018, he retired and returned to South Africa. For a quarter of a century previously, he was professor at the University of Pretoria, where he was named as one of the 100 most influential academic thinkers in the 100-year history of the University of Pretoria, South Africa. Van der Watt was also rated as international acknowledged researcher that is regarded by some of his international peers as international leader in his field. Van der Watt is internationally best known for his monographs.

== Biography ==
Van der Watt was born on 5 November 1952 in Germiston, South Africa. He obtained more than eight university degrees, all with distinction. He also represented his university in rugby and athletics and received provincial colours for athletics which enabled him to be selected for the South African national competition.

In 2008, he received the University of Pretoria Commemorative Research Medal – Honoring our Leading Minds (1908–2008). This medal is awarded to a select number of researchers (100) in all fields, called "Our (= Univ. of Pretoria) leading minds (1908–2008)", that have played a significant role in establishing the University of Pretoria as a leading research institution over the past 100 years of the history of this institution.

As from 2002 up to now he has been graded as an internationally established and leading researcher in his field by the National Research Foundation of South Africa – no New Testament scholar in South Africa has a higher grading. This indicates unanimous international recognition as well established researcher with significant recognition as world leader in particular field–this rating is done through international peer reviewing). He has successfully supervised 43 PhDs and 84 masters candidates. He is currently the general editor of the Review of Biblical Literature (2005–), a member of the SNTS and an Alexander Von Humboldt Foundation scholar, was a Mercator International scholar at the University of Bonn. He was also appointed co-chairperson, responsible for the ‘Johannine literature and general epistles’ of the international 30-volume.

Van der Watt places a high premium on scientifically based popular publications, and is renowned both nationally and internationally as religious speaker and writer. He is one of only six religious writers in South Africa to have sold more than a million copies of his Christian books.

In 1997, and again in 2003, he received the award for best Christian publication for Die Boodskap from the Christian Booksellers of South Africa (CBSA). He was also awarded the sought-after Andrew Murray award in 2000 for Die Bybellenium, and again in 2003 for his role as editor of the impressive Die Bybel A–Z. Another great honour that befell him was being awarded the Totius award by the Suid-Afrikaanse Akademie vir Wetenskap en Kuns in 2006 for his constant outstanding contribution to South African theology.

== Personal life ==
Van der Watt is married to Shireen (née Crous). They have one daughter (Nireen), who is a medical doctor.
