= Asia Theological Association =

Asian association of Christian theological seminaries

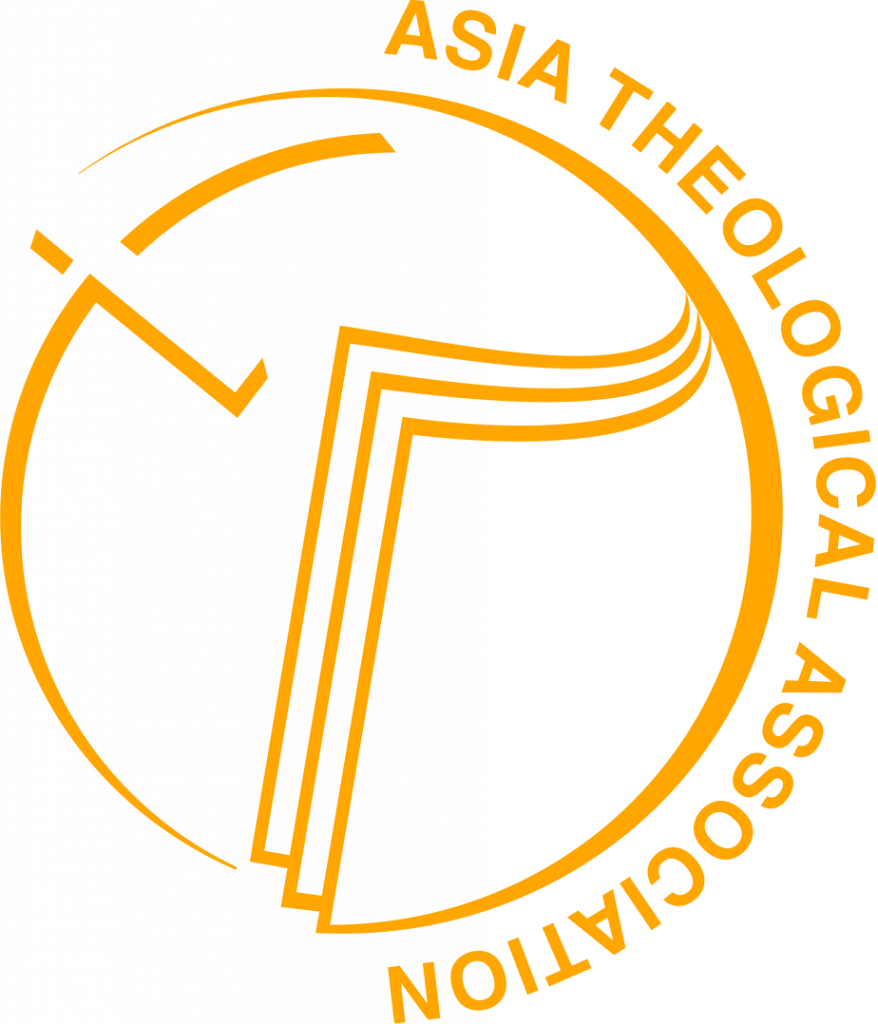
- Formation: 1970
- Location: Quezon City, Philippines
- Website: www.ataasia.com

Asia Theological Association (ATA) is an association of Christian theological seminaries in Asia. It was established in 1970 as a direct outcome of the Asia-South Pacific Congress of Evangelism held in Singapore in 1968. The headquarters is in Quezon City, Philippines. It accredits many leading protestant seminaries and universities across Asia-Pacific, India and Israel.

== History ==
ATA was formally established in 1970 as a direct outcome of the Asia-South Pacific Congress of Evangelism held in Singapore in 1968. Its primary goal was to develop "evangelical scholars, thinkers and teachers" for the leadership of the Asian church.

Accreditation services were rendered to institutions in 1978. Its operating principles include strengthening partnership, enhancing scholarship, furthering academic excellence, fostering spiritual and ministerial formation, and mobilising resources to fulfil global Christian mission within diverse Asian cultures. The main reason for the establishment of ATA was to be an aid to theological institutions in contextualising theology in the Asian context. Through this Christian pastors and Christian churches can be aided to be more effective in supporting Christian ministry more effectively with other Asians in their own context. Today the majority of Evangelical seminaries in Asia are members of ATA.

The ATA's Statement of Faith indicates that theologically it "follows mainstream evangelicalism in the west."

== Accreditation ==
ATA awards theological degreees. It is a member of the International Council for Evangelical Theological Education.

ATA is the Asian sponsor of the International Council for Evangelical Theological Education (ICETE), the theological education network covering all the continents that operates under the auspices of the World Evangelical Alliance (WEA). This effectively partners ATA with established accreditation bodies from other regions of the world, such as The Association for Biblical Higher Education (ABHE) in North America.

Asia Theological Association accredits theological seminaries in the Asian region. However, not all seminaries accredited by ATA are recognised by the respective government. Christian seminaries and theological colleges in India are not recognized by the University Grants Commission (UGC). Since there are no government or UGC approved Seminaries or Divinity Schools in India that provide degrees in biblical languages and Christian theology, the degrees accredited by ATA institutions are recognised by universities and seminaries outside of Indian peninsular, especially in Europe, Australia and North America.

== Publications ==
The ATA published two journals: the Journal of Asian Evangelical Theology and the Journal of Asian Mission. Both are published twice a year.

== Notable accredited institutions ==
- Alliance Bible Seminary, Hong Kong
- Asia Graduate School of Theology, Japan
- Baekseok University, South Korea
- Bethlehem Bible College, West Bank, Palestine
- China Lutheran Seminary, Taiwan
- Chongshin University, South Korea
- Chung Yuan Christian University, Taiwan
- Columbia Theological Seminary, Sri Lanka
- East Asia School of Theology, Singapore
- IPC Theological Seminary, Kottayam, India
- Israel College of the Bible, Israel
- Jerusalem University College, Israel
- Jordan Evangelical Theological Seminary, Jordan
- Malaysia Baptist Theological Seminary, Malaysia
- Reformed Theological Seminary, Seoul, South Korea
- Singapore Bible College, Singapore
- South Asia Institute of Advanced Christian Studies, India
- Tokyo Christian University, Japan
- Torch Trinity Graduate University, South Korea
- Union Biblical Seminary, Pune, India
- University of the Holy Land, Israel
