= Malankara Syrian Orthodox Theological Seminary =

Coordinates: 9.9146°N 76.4280°E

Malankara Syrian Orthodox Theological Seminary (MSOTS) is run by the Malankara Jacobite Syriac Orthodox Church, with an ecumenical outlook. The Malankara Syrian Orthodox Theological Seminary: a venture in union theological training in South India, MSOTS is affiliated to the Senate of Serampore College (University), West Bengal. MSOTS is located in Vettickal, Mulanthuruthy in Ernakulam, Kerala.

== Administration ==
The seminary is under the supervision of H.H. Moran Mor Ignatius Aprem II, the Patriarch of Antioch and all the East, controlled by H.B. Aboon Mor Baselios Thomas I Catholicos, the Episcopal Committee and guided by H.E. Dr. Mor Theophilose Kuriakose Metropolitan. Besides the Seminary is a registered charitable society functioning according to a written registered constitution. The Seminary is affiliated to the Serampore University and after completion of the course the candidates are eligible to get a valid theological degree (BD).

== Courses offered ==
- Certificate of Theology (C.Th.)
- Bachelor of Theology (B.Th.) affiliated to the Senate of Serampore
- Integrated Bachelor of Divinity affiliated to the Senate of Serampore
- Bachelor of Divinity (B.D.) affiliated to the Senate of Serampore
