= Senate of Serampore College (University) =

University in Serampore, West Bengal

- Latin: Serampore senatum collegium (academia)
- Motto: Gloriam sapientes possidebunt
- Motto in English: The wise will possess glory
- Type: Divinity school
- Established: 1818; 208 years ago
- Founders: Baptist missionaries: Joshua Marshman William Carey and William Ward
- Religious affiliation: Baptist
- Chancellor: Bishop Dr. Anilkumar John Servand, Methodist Church in India (The Master, Council of Serampore College)
- President: Rev. Dr. C. I. David Joy, Church of South India
- Location: Mac House Complex, 8 no., William Carey Road; Serampore – 712201, West Bengal, India
- Campus: Semi-Urban
- Language: English
- Registrar: Rev. Dr. Selvam Robertson
- Secretary: Rev. Dr. Elungkiebe Zeliang
- Treasurer: Rev. R. Lalnunzira
- Website: senateofseramporecollege.edu.in

The Senate of Serampore College (University) is a private ecumenical affiliating body for Christian theological education, which works in partnership with Bible colleges, seminaries and theological research institutes in the Indian subcontinent that comply with its regulations and standards. The college was founded by the Baptist missionaries Joshua Marshman, William Carey and William Ward (the Serampore trio), to give an education in arts and sciences to students of every "caste, colour, creed or country" and to train a ministry for the growing Church in India. It is located in Serampore in West Bengal, India. Serampore was granted the status of university by King Frederick VI of Denmark in 1829.

== History ==
Since Serampore was then a Danish colony, King Frederick VI, the King of Denmark, issued Serampore College its Royal Charter of Incorporation on 23 February 1827, in Copenhagen, Denmark (Charter, 1, Charter, 2, Charter, 3). The charter came in response to Baptist missionary Joshua Marshman's visit to King Frederick in August 1826; the charter gave Serampore College the privilege of awarding degrees in Arts and Theology. Baptist missionaries William Carey, Joshua Marshman, and John Clark Marshman (Joshua's son) were designated as members of the first Council. At its opening, the Trio released a prospectus which proposed "A College for the instruction of Asiatic Christian and other Youth in Eastern Literature and European Science." The college was open to all persons of any caste or creed, and the founders ensured that no denominational test would apply to faculty members.

After 22 February 1845 when Denmark sold all of its Indian assets to Britain, the management and operation of the college continued without interruption under the direction of a master and council. In 1856 the Baptist Missionary Society in England took over the management of the college and, in 1857, the college became affiliated with the newly established University of Calcutta and became a constituent college of that university. In 1883 the college closed as an arts college and began functioning as a Christian Training Institution and a theological institute for the Baptist churches in Bengal.

The Royal charter has also been confirmed by the Bengal Govt Act. IV of 1918.

== Accreditation and Charter ==
The Senate of Serampore College draws its power to award degree from the Royal Charter awarded by King Frederick VI of Denmark, giving the Senate of Serampore College the status of a degree granting university. Through the Danish Charter, Serampore became the first institution in India to be given the status of a university.

The Senate of Serampore College is not accredited by any other theological association, academic body or council. Also, the National Assessment and Accreditation Council (NAAC) has given its accreditation only for the secular degree programs of Serampore College, a sister institution, for the degrees that are awarded through University of Calcutta.

The degrees that are awarded by Senate of Serampore are not recognised under the UGC Act for the purpose of the Section 22 of the Act and are awarded by Senate without the need for approval of the University Grants Commission (India). Seminary students having degrees that are not listed under UGC Act of Section 22 are not eligible to sit for public service examinations, or avail public employment or government research grant, etc. based on their degrees.

However, "[Only the] Students of Serampore College in the Faculty of Theology are, entitled to all the privileges of students in any of the other universities and colleges in India." This entitlement does not extend to other affiliated colleges.

Senate of Serampore College practices autonomy in the preparation of its curriculum in partnership with the affiliated colleges.

== Degrees awarded ==
Presently, the Senate of Serampore College (University) restricts itself to award of degrees pertaining to theology.

The degrees conferred by the Senate of Serampore are not recognised under the University Grants Commission (UGC) Act, 1956 for the purposes of Section 22 of the Act. These degrees are awarded autonomously by the Senate.

Most Universities in India neither recognise nor accept the Senate of Serampore degree for higher studies program and as eligibility criteria for doctoral studies. As such the doctorate received from the Senate can only be used within the ecclesiastical context of the recipient.

Students of Senate of Serampore are not eligible to appear for public service examinations, nor to seek public employment or government-funded research grants on the basis of such qualifications as their degrees are not listed under Section 22 of the UGC Act.

However, “Students of Serampore College in the Faculty of Theology are entitled to all the privileges of students in any of the other universities and colleges in India.” This provision is limited to Serampore College which is different from other theological colleges that are affiliated to the Senate.

The theology curriculum of Senate includes various courses offered in the fields of religion and culture including the study of Old Testament, New Testament, Christian Theology, Study of Classical Biblical Languages: Biblical Hebrew, Biblical Greek, other classical languages: Sanskrit, Arabic, Syriac, Pali, German, Latin etc., Study of other Major Religions: Hinduism, Islam, Buddhism, Jainism, Sikhism; Ministry related courses such as: Homiletics, Christian Worship and Music, Pastoral Care and Counselling, Clinical Counseling, Christian Education, Communication, Social Analysis, History of Christianity, Missiology, Contextual Theologies and Christian Ministry.

The following are the degrees awarded to students through its affiliated colleges throughout India, Nepal, Bangladesh, and Sri Lanka:

=== Diploma programmes ===
- Diploma in Worship and Music (Dip.W.M)
- Diploma in Christian Studies (Dip. C.S) (External)
- Diploma in Clinical Pastoral Counselling (Dip.C.P.C)
- Diploma in Bible Translation (Dip B.T)

=== Graduate programmes ===
- Bachelor of Theology (B.Th)
- Bachelor of Missiology (B.Miss)
- Bachelor of Christian Studies (B.C.S.) (External)

=== Postgraduate programmes ===
- Bachelor of Divinity (B.D)
- Master of Theology (M.Th)
- Masters in Counselling and Psychotherapy (MCP)
- Master of Ministry (M.Min.) (External)
- Master of Christian Studies (MCS) (External)

=== Doctoral programmes ===
- Doctor of Ministry (D.Min)
- Doctor of Theology (D.Th)

== Constituent colleges ==
- Serampore College (Theology Department), Serampore
- South Asia Theological Research Institute, Serampore

== Affiliated colleges ==
The affiliated colleges of the university up to 2016 are,
No.	State	Institution	Founded	Town PIN	Courses	
No.	State	Institution	Founded	Town PIN	Residential	Non-residential
I	Andhra Pradesh	Bethel Bible College	2000	Guntur; 522 006	B.D.	B.C.S.
II	Andhra Pradesh	Master's College of Theology	1996	Visakhapatnam; 530 041	B.D.	Dip.C.S. B.C.S.
III	Assam	Eastern Theological College		Jorhat; 785 014	B.D. M.Th.	Dip.C.S. B.C.S.
IV	Gujarat	Gujarat United School of Theology		Ahmedabad; 380 006	B.Th.	-
V	Gujarat	Methodist Bible Seminary		Vasad; 388 306	B.Th.	Dip.C.S.
VI	Haryana	Dharma Jyoti Vidyapeeth		Faridabad; 121 101	B.D.	-
VII	Haryana	Nav Jyoti Post graduate and Research Centre		Faridabad; 121 006	M.Th.	-
VIII	Jharkhand	Gossner Theological College	1866	Ranchi; 834 001	B.Th.	-
IX	Jharkhand	Santal Theological College		Benagaria; 814 101	B.Th.	-
X	Karnataka	Karnataka Theological College	1965	Mangalore	B.D.	Dip.C.S.
XI	Karnataka	United Theological College, Bangalore	1910	Bangalore	B.D. M.Th. D.Th.	-
XII	Kerala	Faith Theological Seminary, Manakala	1970	Adoor; 691 551	B.D. B.Miss. M.Th. D.Th.	B.C.S.
XIV	Kerala	Federated Faculty for Research in Religion and Culture,		Kottayam; 686 001	M.Th. D.Th.	-
XV	Kerala	India Bible College and Seminary	1930	Thiruvalla; 689 541	B.D.	-
XVI	Kerala	Kerala Theological Seminary	2000	Kottarakara; 691 531	B.D.	-
XVII	Kerala	Kerala United Theological Seminary	1943	Thiruvananthapuram; 695 011	B.D.	-
XVIII	Kerala	Malankara Syrian Orthodox Theological Seminary		Mulanthuruthy; 682 314	B.D.	-
XIX	Kerala	Mar Thoma Episcopal Jubilee Institute of Evangelism		Tiruvalla; 689 105	B.Th.	-
XX	Kerala	Mar Thoma Syrian Theological Seminary, Kottayam		Kottayam; 686 001	B.D.	-
XXI	Kerala	Orthodox Theological Seminary	1815	Kottayam; 686 001	B.D.	Dip.W.M.
XXII	Madhya Pradesh	Leonard Theological College		Jabalpur; 482 001	B.D.	-
XXIII	Maharashtra	St. Thomas Orthodox Theological Seminary	1995	Nagpur; 441 501	B.D.	-
XXIV	Maharashtra	Union Biblical Seminary	1953	Pune; 411 037	B.D. M.Th. D.Th.	-
XXV	Maharashtra	United Theological Seminary of Maharashtra		Pune; 411 001	B.Th.	Dip.C.S.
XXVI	Manipur	Manipur Theological College		Kangpokpi; 795 129	B.D.	-
XXVII	Manipur	Trulock Theological Seminary		Imphal; 795 001	B.D.	-
XXVIII	Meghalaya	Harding Theological College		Tura; 794 002	B.D.	-
XXIX	Meghalaya	John Roberts Theological Seminary		Shillong; 798 009	B.D.	-
XXX	Mizoram	Academy of Integrated Christian Studies	2000	Aizawl; 796 001	B.D. M.Th.	-
XXXI	Mizoram	Aizawl Theological College	1907	Aizawl; 796 001	B.D. M.Th. D.Th.	B.C.S. M.C.S.
XXXII	Mizoram	Missionary Training College		Aizawl; 796 005	B.Miss.	-
XXXIII	Nagaland	Baptist Theological College		Pfütsero; 797 107	B.D.	-
XXXIV	Nagaland	Clark Theological College		Mokokchung; 798 601	B.D. M.Th.	-
XXXV	Nagaland	Trinity Theological College		Dimapur; 797 112	B.D.	-
XXXVI	Nagaland	Witter Theological College		Wokha; 797 111	B.D.	-
XXXVII	Odisha	Orissa Christian Theological College		Gopalpur; 761 002	B.Th.	-
XXXVIII	Tamil Nadu	Bethel Bible Institute,		Danishpet; 636 354	B.D. B.Miss.	-
XXXIX	Tamil Nadu	Concordia Theological Seminary		Nagercoil; 629 001	B.D.	-
XL	Tamil Nadu	Gurukul Lutheran Theological College	1953	Chennai; 600 010	B.D. M.Th.	-
XLI	Tamil Nadu	Indian Theological Seminary	1990	Chennai; 600 062	B.D.	-
XLII	Tamil Nadu	Madras Theological Seminary and College		Chennai; 600 010	B.D.	B.C.S.
XLIII	Tamil Nadu	Tamil Nadu Theological Seminary	1969	Madurai; 625 010	B.D. M.Th.	Dip.C.S. B.C.S.
XLIV	Telangana	Advanced Institute for Research on Religion and Culture	2016	Hyderabad; 500 052	M.Th.	-
XLV	Telangana	Andhra Christian Theological College	1964	Hyderabad; 500 080	B.D.	Dip.C.S. B.C.S. M.C.S.
XLVI	Telangana	Calvin Institute of Theology		Yacharam; 501 509	B.D.	-
XLVII	Telangana	Mennonite Brethren Centenary Bible College	1920	Shamshabad; 501 218	B.D.	Dip.C.S.
XLVIII	Uttarakhand	Luther W. New Jr. Theological College,		Dehra Dun; 248 001	B.D. Dip.W.M.	-
XLIX	Uttar Pradesh	Allahabad Bible Seminary		Allahabad; 211 002	B.D.	Dip.C.S., B.C.S.
L	West Bengal	Bishop's College		Kolkata; 700 017	B.D.	-
LI	West Bengal	Calcutta Bible Seminary		North 24 Parganas; 700 132	B.D.	-
LII	West Bengal	North India Institute of Post Graduate Theological Studies	1980	Serampore; 712 201	M.Th. D.Th.	-

=== Other affiliated centres ===
Affiliated centres as of 2014 for the purpose of Diploma in Clinical Pastoral Counselling.

- Karnataka
  - Christian Medical Association of India, Bangalore
- Kerala
  - Life Enrichment Counselling and Training Centre, Idukki district
  - Mar Thoma Hospital Guidance, Trivandrum
  - T. M. A. Institute of Counselling, Kottayam
- Tamil Nadu
- Christian Medical College, Vellore, Vellore
