= Indian Pentecostal Church of God =

Pentecostal Christian denomination from Kerala

The India Pentecostal Church of God
- IPC ഇന്ത്യ പെന്തക്കോസ്ത് ദൈവസഭ
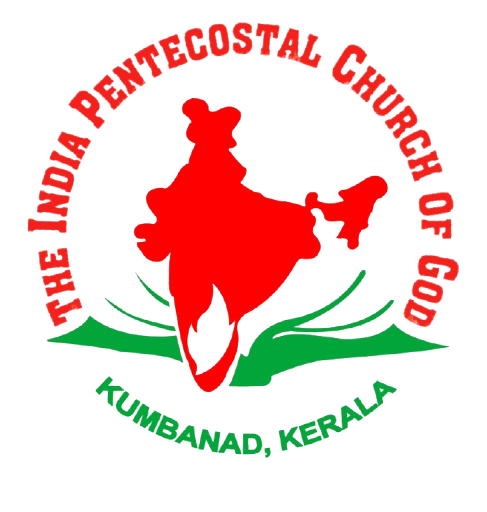
- Abbreviation: IPC
- Classification: Protestant
- Orientation: Evangelicalism
- Scripture: Protestant Bible
- Theology: Pentecostal
- Polity: Presbyterian polity
- Governance: General Presbytery (ministerial oversight); General Council (administrative oversight)
- General President: Rev. Dr. T. Valson Abraham (Recently Deceased)
- General Vice President: Rev. Dr. Philip P. Thomas
- General Secretary: Rev. Dr.Thomas George
- Headquarters: Kumbanad, India
- Origin: Started in July 1924; 102 years ago, as 'Thennindia Pentecosthu Daivasabha'; Registered on 9 December 1935 as 'The Indian Pentecostal Church of God' at Eluru
- Separated from: Kerala Brethren; Malankara Pentecostal Church
- Branched from: Saint Thomas Christians
- Official website: https://ipc.live

The Indian Pentecostal Church of God (IPC) is the largest indigenous Pentecostal Christian denomination in India. Its organisational headquarters is located in Kumbanad, Kerala, India. The movement originated in 1924.

== History ==
IPC traces its origins to the Pentecostal revival in India during the early twentieth century. The movement was initiated by Pastor K. E. Abraham and others, originally associated with the Jacobite and Orthodox Syrian Christian tradition. After having an experience of the baptism in the Holy Spirit in 1923, they separated from their former denomination and many others joined them to form IPC.

List of General Presidents
- Rev. P.M. Samuel
- Rev. K.E. Abraham
- Rev. P.M. Samuel
- Rev. T.G. Oommen
- Rev. P.L. Paramjyothi
- Rev. K.M. Joseph
- Rev. T.S. Abraham
- Rev. K.C. John
- Rev. Jacob John
- Rev. T. Valson Abraham
- Rev.Phillip.P.Thomas

The first united Pentecostal convention related to the IPC movement was held in April 1925 in Ranny, Kerala. The meeting brought together several early Indian Pentecostal leaders who had separated from Kerala Brethren and other mainline Malankara Churches, including Pastors T. G. Oommen and P. M. Samuel. The movement was first called as The South Indian Pentecostal Church.

In 1933, a council of twelve ministers was formed, and P. M. Samuel was elected the first President of the fellowship. The denomination was formally registered as The Indian Pentecostal Church of God on 9 December 1935 in Eluru, Andhra Pradesh, marking the establishment of the organisation as a legally recognised body committed to spiritual and administrative self-reliance.

The early leaders of IPC emphasised indigenous Indian movement, independent of Western missionary control. The movement maintained that Indian churches should be completely oriental in character and managed by Indians. The IPC opposed foreign control of Indian churches. Roger E. Hedlund describes IPC as an example of Indian Christian nationalism.

The denomination expanded rapidly across South India, especially among Malayalam-speaking Christians, and later throughout India and regions with significant Indian diaspora populations, including the United States, Canada, the United Kingdom, and the Middle East.

A notable schism occurred in 1953, resulting in the formation of the Sharon Fellowship Church.

== Administration ==
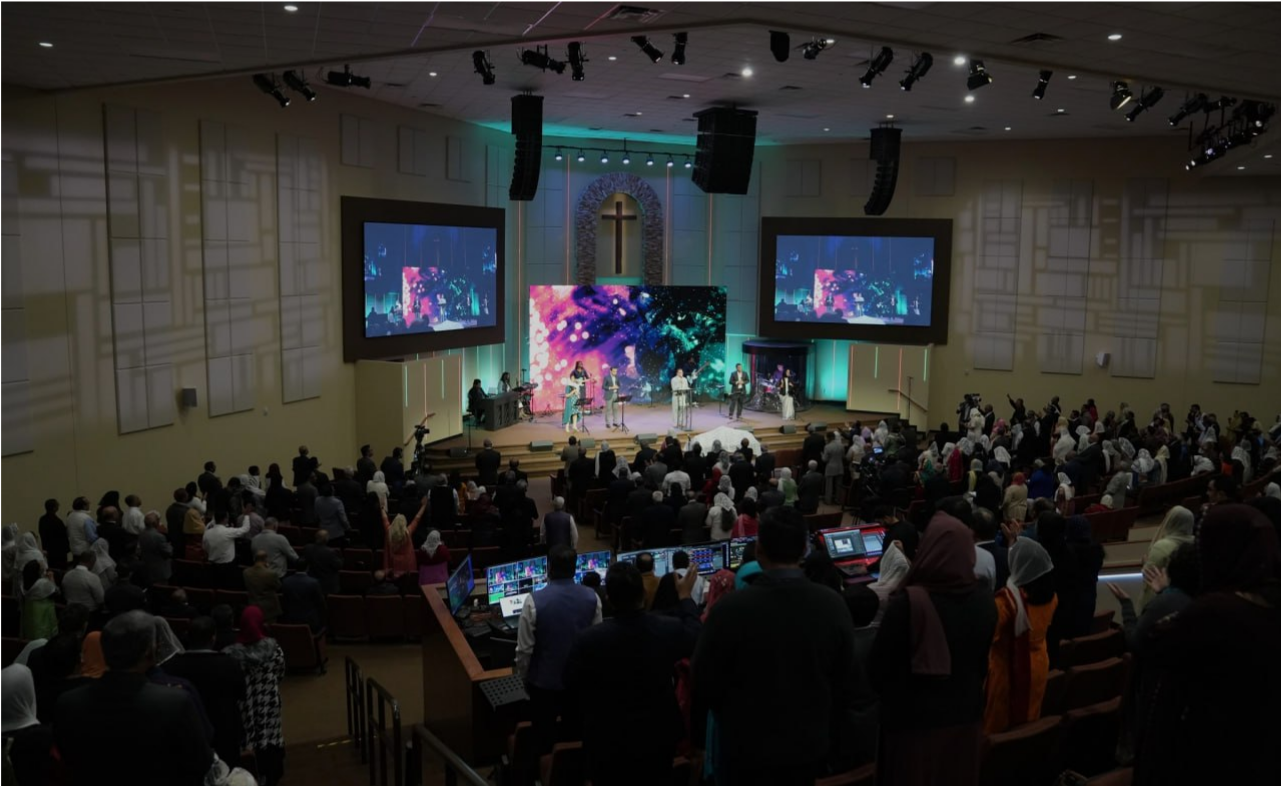
Sunday Service at IPC Hebron, Houston

IPC follows a mixed Presbyterian form of church governance. A group of local churches in neighbouring cities and town forms a district and is administered by the District Presbytery and Council. All the districts in a state or region are managed by the State Presbytery and Council. The General Presbytery and Council oversees the overall functioning of the denomination.

The ministerial oversight is exercised through the Presbytery system, which functions at the general, regional, and district levels. The General Presbytery, comprising ordained ministers, is responsible for doctrinal supervision, ordination of clergy, and disciplinary matters. The State and Region Presbyteries coordinate ministry at the state level, while District Presbyteries oversee local church affairs. The General Presbytery is the final court of appeal in all matters within IPC.

The administrative oversight is structured at multiple administrative levels:

- General Council,
- State or Region Councils,
- District Councils, and
- Local Church Councils.

The General Council is the supreme legislative and administrative authority and is elected at the end of each term by the General Body.

The Local churches operate autonomously in daily matters but remain subject to IPC’s constitution and doctrinal standards. Elders, elected from among spiritually mature members, provide leadership and administer sacraments. Congregations with more than 21 baptised members may be formally recognised as local churches under IPC governance.

== Related bodies ==
IPC oversees several auxiliary ministries, including Bible colleges and schools, the Pentecostal Young People’s Association (PYPA), the Fellowship of Women – Indian Pentecostal Women’s Association, and Sunday schools.
