= Early phase of printing in Calcutta =

In the last quarter of the 18th century, Calcutta grew into the first major centre of commercial and government printing. For the first time in the context of South Asia it becomes possible to talk of a nascent book trade which was full-fledged and included the operations of printers, binders, subscription publishing and libraries.

== Background ==
The question which begins Graham Shaw's seminal work on this period Printing in Calcutta to 1800 is whether the small self-contained European community in Calcutta strongly felt the need for a printing press. Shaw emphasizes how the early phase of printing in Calcutta marked a transition between print culture and a culture that depended on a race of scribes. A letter to the editor of the India Gazette (7 April 1781) implies how the easy availability of scribes made printing seem a less urgent step to be introduced by the government

"Not many months ago, before the fear of printing in Bengal was somewhat abated, the discerning humourists of the colony were infrequently entertained with manuscript advertisements, hand bills, and other manuals of advice, with divers and sundry further literary; either hawked about, like state minutes in circulation…."

Miles Ogborn partly answers the question that Shaw raises in Indian Ink: script and print in the making of the English East India Company when he explains how the East India Company introduced printing not simply to facilitate trade, but more importantly, to consolidate the empire. Therefore, the "fear of printing" as cited in the letter above disappears in the 1770s when the Company needs to cement the empire. Till this time, scribes made handwritten announcements and promulgations as seen in the letter cited above.

== Early days ==
Shaw traces the name of forty printers in and around Calcutta in the period 1770–1800. It would be interesting to note that most of the printers he documents meticulously were associated with the printing of newspapers. S. Natarajan studies these early Calcutta newspapers and the antagonistic relationship they often shared with the official authorities which led to certain restrictions laid by the Wellesley Regulations. The most widely circulated papers were the weeklies The India Gazette (Monday), Hickey's Bengal Gazette (Saturday), The Calcutta Chronicle (Tuesday), The Calcutta Gazette (Thursday), The Asiatic Mirror (Wednesday) and The Recorder (Sunday). Other than newspapers, the printers also took up certain commissions like both legal and mercantile advertisements as well as printing stationery to supplement their incomes. However, the most substantial revenue was generated by the printing of almanacs. Calendars and almanacs were prepared according to the Christian, Hindu and Muslim eras. These were often also combined with exhaustive lists of the East India Company's servants and the list of European residents in Calcutta outside the employ of the company, thus making the almanacs of considerable historical interest. Most notable of these were the 1784 almanac compiled by Reuben Burrow, an early enthusiast of Hindu astrology, the regular India Calendar by the Honorable Company's Press, The Bengal Kalendar and Register by the Chronicle Press and The Civil and Military Register by The India Gazette Office. Other than official publications, the imprints of early Calcutta were designed to meet the immediate and more practical requirements of the small European community – maps, grammars and lexicons of the local vernaculars, treatises on medicine, law and land revenue, and so on. A small amount of creative literature and scholarly interest in Persian and Sanskrit traditions was also generated.

The local presses suffered immense difficulties due to their limited capacity and resources. Sir William Jones had famously remarked that "printing is dear at Calcutta" and "the compositors in this country are shamefully inaccurate." The usual mode of publication, i.e. by raising subscriptions was problematic and more reminiscent of patronage culture than mercantile capitalism. Additionally, without the East India Company's sanction for a printer, the printing press could not go very far. High costs of printing were basically due to the fact that the equipment had to be imported from Europe.

== Significant printers ==
James Augustus Hicky was initially a trader in ships’ cargoes. In 1775-6 he met with heavy losses and was imprisoned for debt. It is difficult to reconstruct how exactly he came by the two thousand rupees that was required to construct the wooden press with which he began operations. In 1777, he assembled the earliest known Calcutta press and in the same year he was engaged by the East India Company to print their military bills and batta forms. He was often given commissions which he did not complete or was never paid in full for. Hicky was notorious for his clashes with authority. January 1780 marked the publication of the first Indian newspaper in any language, the weekly Hicky's Bengal Gazette.

Johann Zacharias Kiernander was Swedish by birth and the first Protestant missionary in Bengal. He arrived in Calcutta in 1758 from Tranquebar at the instance of the Society for Promoting Christian Knowledge. After twenty years of evangelical work in Calcutta during which he was supplied printed religious material by the SPCK in London and the Tranquebar and Vepery Presses, he established the first mission press in the whole of Bengal and Northern India. Kerniander established this press in March 1779 with materials sent by SPCK. In 1780 he printed The Christian's Companion for his congregation. In the early 1780s however he ventured into the realm of commercial printing with English almanacs and court writs. This brought him into confrontation with Hicky.

== Hicky vs. Kiernander ==
When Kiernander wanted to get into advertising in print the "forms of writs used in the Supreme Court of Judicature, & c." Hicky took it upon himself to poke fun at a man set out to become a prospective rival "For the good of the Mission…A part of the types sent out on the behalf of the Mission, to assist the pious design of propagating the Gospel in foreign parts, are now employed in printing Warrants, Summon’s Writs of Lattitats, and Special Capias—those Blister Plaister of the Law."

Hicky's distorted "Mr. Caninder" (as Hicky calls him in the May 1781 Hicky's Bengal Gazette) was primarily the bane of Hicky's life as a printer because of the help and assistance that he gave to the printers of the India Gazette.

A detailed account of the significance of the rivalry between Hicky and Kiernander may be found in G. Duverdier: Deux imprimeurs en proces a Calcutta: Hicky contre Kiernander (1777–1787), (Paris: Moyon Orient & Ocean Orient 2, 1985.)

Bernard Messink was another of Hicky's principal foes. He was involved with the management of the Calcutta Theatre until about 1780 when he established the India Gazette with his partner Peter Reed. The two are notable for establishing the second weekly after the Hicky's Bengal Gazette and for trying to lure away the readership of the latter.

== Charles Wilkins ==
Charles Wilkins is perhaps the most significant figure in the history of printing in Bengal at this time. He was a writer in the employ of the East India Company. In 1770, he sailed to India where he quickly distinguished himself by showing an extraordinary proficiency in Persian, Sanskrit and Bengali. In 1778, he was asked by the Governor General Warren Hastings to prepare the earliest known set of Bengali types for N. B. Halhed's A Grammar of the Bengali Language. The success of the enterprise and Hicky's scurrilous attacks on the Company led the company to feel that it would be better off setting up its own press rather than in employing a contract printer. Accordingly, Wilkins was asked to draw up a plan for a press. In December 1778, he was appointed the first superintendent of the Honourable Company's Press. The Press began its operations in Malda, 175 miles north of Calcutta, and only shifted to Calcutta in 1781, when Wilkins was appointed the Persian and Bengali translator of the Committee of Revenue. He printed about thirteen works. In the preface to Halhed's works Wilkins is lauded for having been metallurgist, engraver, founder and printer. He also exemplified how good printing is actually a collaborative exercise. The well known gem-and-seal engraver Joseph Shepherd, as well as the Bengali blacksmith Panchanan Karmakar, were employed to help him with the designing and cutting of types, and the casting of fonts.

== Significance of the period 1770-1800 ==
After 1800, the establishment of the Baptist Mission Press in Serampore and Fort William College in Calcutta consolidated printing in Bengal. With the proliferation of grammar books, the production of Bengali prose through vernacular grammars and educational books, and with the sudden rise in Orientalist learning through figures like William Jones, 19th century printing presented a completely different narrative of empire. Yet the early days and attempts were also significant because they marked a transitional phase into a modern print culture. In the circulation of a number of weeklies that catered to public taste and often took on the establishment, we see a notion of an emergent public sphere as studied by Jürgen Habermas. In its early days, the print culture in India was largely restricted to the Anglo-Indian community, which attempted to re-produce the British style of public debate. Chris Bayly writes:

The British introduced to India not only a knowledgeable bureaucracy but also their own energetic style of public debate. The expatriates never fashioned a creole nationalism. They were too small in numbers, too dependent on Crown and Company and too divided from Eurasian and Indian society by racial exclusiveness to accomplish this. Controversies amongst them raged nevertheless in press and pamphlet and Indian issues became entangled with domestic political divisions. Free merchants railed against the Company monopoly, especially when its Charter came up for periodic revision. Missionaries attempted to create a godly public sphere in which the paganism of the Company would be argued away and India flooded with improving pamphlets. Fierce controversies over press freedom erupted as Wellesley and John Adam clamped down on newspapers that had substituted sustained political criticism for the grub-street prurience exemplified by James Hicky's Bengal Gazette of the 1780s.

Bayly takes note of the fact that the Indian scholars or pundits already had their own models of public debate, significantly different from the patterns of interaction observed in the Western public sphere arising out of print culture. However, the new Western-educated Indian intelligentsia was receptive to these newer models of debate and discussion. Though Indian-published newspapers did not emerge till the first decades of the 19th century in any considerable number, Indians had started to participate in Western modes of public interaction. At the same time, a great amount of prose in the vernacular languages began to appear.

== Sanskrit Press in Calcutta ==
Around 1806–07, a Hindu called Babu Ram established a printing machine for the first time, in Devanagari type, at Kidderpore, Calcutta, for publishing Sanskrit books. Thomas Roebuck in The Annals of the College of Fort William talks about the Lord Minto's lecture at Fort William College on 27 February 1808: "A printing press has been established by learned Hindoos, furnished with complete founts of improved Nagree types of different sizes, for the printing of books in the Sunskrit language. This press has been encouraged by the College to undertake an edition of the best Sunskrit Dictionaries, and a compilation of the Sunskrit rules of Grammar... It may be hoped, that the introduction of the art of printing among the Hindoos, which has been thus begun by the institution of a Sunskrit press, will promote the general diffusion of knowledge among this numerous and very ancient people; at the same time that it becomes the means of preserving the classic remains of their literature and sciences."

In 1814–15, Munshi Lallu Lal, a Gujarati Brahmin (of Brij Bhumi) at Fort William was believed to have acquired the rights to Babu Ram's "Sanskrit Press" (not to be confused with Vidyasagar's later Sanskrit Press and Depository). Apart from Sanskrit and now Hindi texts, Lal made provision for the publication of Bengali works as well. At this same press was published Pandit Ram Chandra Vidyabagish's Jyotish Sangrahasar.

== See also ==
- Calcutta School-Book Society
- The Bengal Hurkaru and Chronicle
