= Freedom of the press in British India =

Constitutionally provided right

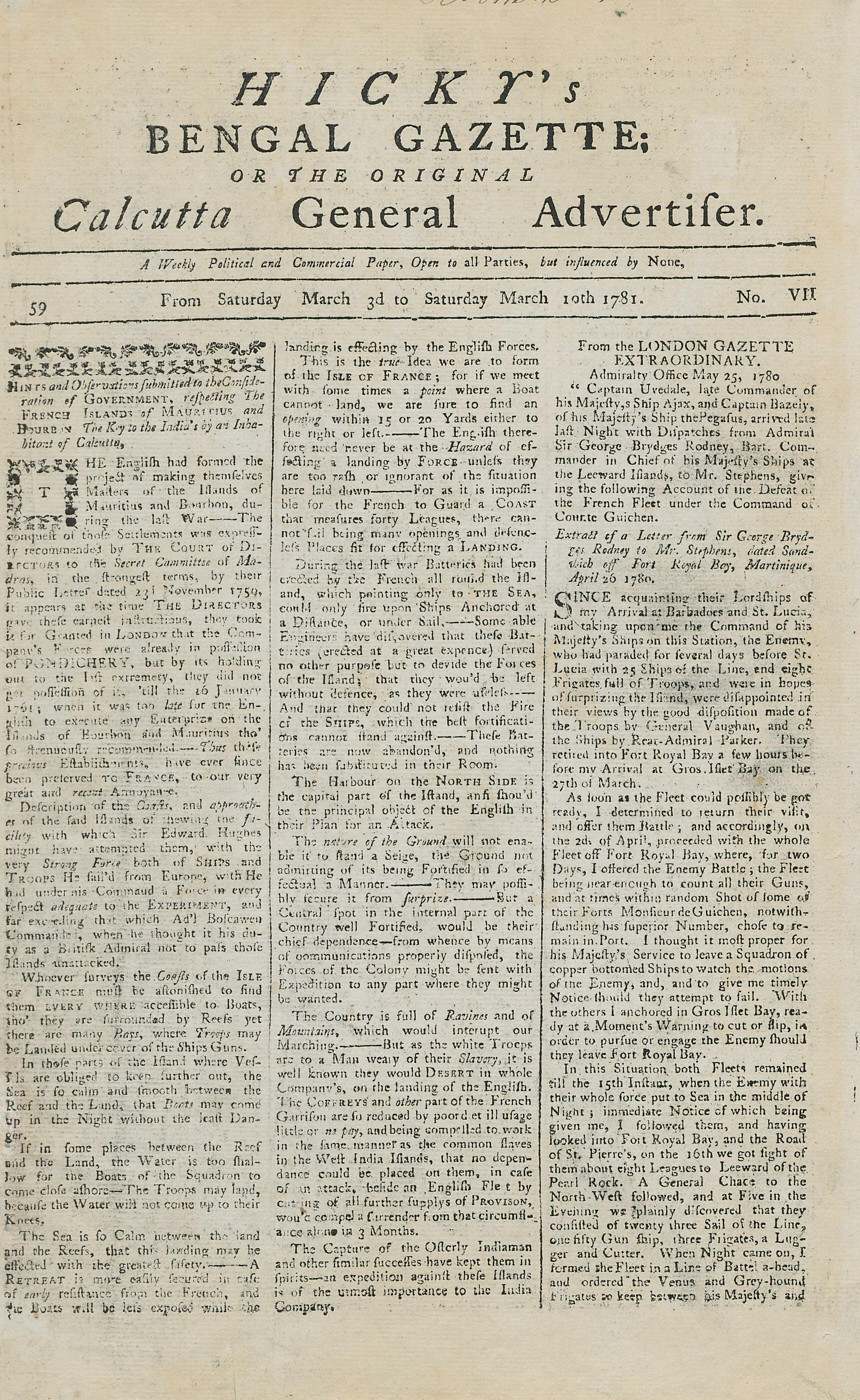
Hicky's Bengal Gazette in 1781, India's first newspaper

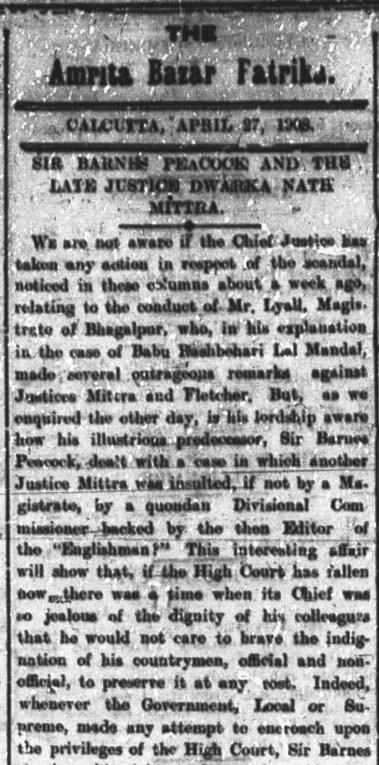
Amrita Bazar Patrika in 1908, India's first Bengali language and oldest bilingual newspaper started around 1868

Freedom of the press in British India or freedom of the press in pre-independence India refers to the censorship on print media during the period of the British Raj under the British Crown on the Indian subcontinent from 1858 to 1947. The Indian press was legally protected by the set of laws such as Vernacular Press Act, Censorship of Press Act, 1799, Metcalfe Act and Indian Press Act, 1910, while the media outlets were regulated by the Licensing Regulations, 1823, Licensing Act, 1857 and Registration Act, 1867. The British Raj administrators in the India subcontinent (in modern-day Republic of India, Islamic Republic of Pakistan and People's Republic of Bangladesh) brought a set of rules and regulations into effect designed to prevent circulating claimed inaccurate, media bias and disinformation across the subcontinent.

In pre-independence, the government formulated several legal actions, including Gagging Act, comprised a set of rules for publishing, distributing and circulating news stories and operating media organizations working independently or running in the subcontinent. These rules primarily compelled regional and English-language newspapers to express their concerns under the selected provisions. During the period, government allowed a journalist or media industries to cover any story and brought it to the audiences without impacting sovereignty in subcontinent.

== History ==
The British administrators are often credited for introducing the "independent journalism" (English press) in the subcontinent. During the period, the press became an instrumental for leaders, activists and the government itself. James Augustus Hicky, also referred to as "father of Indian press", a British citizen known for introducing first newspaper during the reign, and hence India's press foundation was originally led by the British administration despite the self-censorship by the imperialism. Hicky wrote articles independently on corruption and other scandals without naming the officials. To avoid lawsuits, he used multiple nicknames while referring to the authorities throughout his articles. In 1807, Hicky's Bengal Gazette was seized by the authorities for publishing anti-government articles.

The history of the press in pre and modern India is covered by a book titled War over Words: Censorship in India, 1930-1960 by Devika Sethi. It was published by the Cambridge University Press in 2019.

== Censorship on press ==
During the reign, administration was claimed to have involved in direct and self-censorship, leading some newspapers to stop publishing articles after licenses were revoked. Prior to the Indian Rebellion of 1857, the press was actively involved in independence movement and in demonstration coverages, leading the government to get involved in self-censorship on the press freedom. Later, Lord Lytton enacted Gagging Act to control the publications in the subcontinent, and while it compelled every newspaper, particularly English-language publications, the media organizations had to apply for a license upon ensuring "nothing was written against the government". The Gagging Act didn't affect the media, and it continued working until the new measures were taken. During the 1870s, the regional newspapers, including Amrita Bazar Patrika published vernacular language were also involved in encouraging people against the rule. Amrita Bazar Patrika, 1868's Bengali weekly newspaper caught government attention after it published about Indigo revolt.

In the 1880s, the government formulated several new laws following the role of the press in freedom movement, and later the government. However, after formation of the Indian National Congress, the government enacted numerous sections in 1898 such as section 565, 124A and 153A of the Indian Penal Code. The government later enacted four new laws, comprised a comprehensive set of rules for media organizations. Among those were the Newspapers (Incitement to Offences) Act 1908, the Prevention of Seditious Meetings Act 1911, the Indian Press Act, 1910, the Criminal Law Amendment Act 1908, and the Secrets Act 1903.

The Press Act 1910 impacted almost all newspapers. It is believed around 1,000 publications were prosecuted under the Act, and government collected ₹500,000 of securities and forfeitures from the papers during the period of first five years the Act was enacted. Several journalists and publications, including the Amrita Bazar Patrika were charged under sedition law for publishing anti-government articles. In the later period, the Press Emergency Act 1931 was actively exercised amid Satyagraha, a nonviolent resistance or press advocacy (rally the masses) against the British rule.

Following the Salt March, the Act played significantly in Bombay, Uttar Pradesh, Bengal, Madras, Delhi and Punjab for British administration to maintain a self-censorship on speech, public communication, or other information, on such material was considered objectionable. It is claimed the rule was involved in propaganda, while international news was also filtered. In November 1939, the authorities restricted newspapers from writing about the hunger strikes, which were held by prisoners across the country.

The editors later raised concerns regarding the freedom of expression and safeguard of the press. The All-India Newspapers Editors' Conference also emerged during the period. It demanded the government to lift the restrictions on the press. In 1941, Mahatma Gandhi criticised the authorities for restricting media, citing "In the name of the war effort, all expression of opinion is effectively suppressed". Despite varieties of criticism, the government continued to prohibit the press. The government subsequently asked The Hitavada newspaper to reveal the name of its reporter. The authorities also conducted investigations at the office of Hindustan Times. It restricted the press and rebellion activities under the Defence of India Act 1915 from making announcements to the masses. It also extended imprisonment to five years, while the Official Secrets Act was passed to provide death sentence to those involved in anti-government editorials.

In 1942 following the Quit India Movement, the press was instructed not cover any news about political parties. The All-India Newspaper Editors' Conference subsequently compiled the government order stating the newspapers will observe caution and refrain from publishing on Quit India Movement.

== Protests ==
In 1919, the government introduced Rowlatt Act to indefinitely detain people without trial involved in anti-government activities. The Act was also designed to restrict writing, speech and movements carried out amid civil disobedience policies. The Rowlatt resulted in hundreds of killings.

== Major newspapers ==
In 1780, James Augustus Hickey launched Hicky's Bengal Gazette in Kolkata, which was later banned in 1872 following the anti-government editorials. In the later period, more newspaper and journals were launched such as the Bengal Journal, the Bombay Herald, The Calcutta Chronicle and General Advertiser and Madras Courier. The subcontinent saw numerous publications such as Samachar Sudha Varashan, Payam-e-Azadi, Sultan-ul-Akhbar and Doorbeen. All newspapers played significant role in Indian independence movement, while numerous publications, including Payam-e-Azadi were banned or seized by the government over spreading information which was considered "objectionable".

=== Journalists arrested ===
The British Indian journalists experienced difficult situation due to comprehensive set of rules. Bal Gangadhar Tilak, was the founder of two newspapers such as Kesari and Mahratta. He used to run the both to criticise the rule and also defended Shivaji VI when government declared him "mad". Later, government arrested Tilak and charged him with sedition. G. Subramania Iyer, a social reformer and journalist created two newspapers such as The Hindu and Swadesamitran. He used to encourage Tamils through his writings to participate in the resistance movement. The government arrested and charged him with defamation law, leading him to serve in jail.

During the 1910s, a Malayalam publication and journalist Swadeshabhimani Ramakrishna Pillai, used to write for a journal owned by Vakkom Moulavi. Pillai was actively involved in writing against P. Rajagopalachari, and later he was arrested and displaced by the government, leading him to spend his last days in Tirunelveli, Tamil Nadu.

== Underground press ==
During the period of British rule and resistance movement, the freedom activists and leaders illegally shared information through secret radio messages and cyclostyled sheets, and also graffitied on the walls. Some underground publications were working secretly after authorities imposed restrictions on major publications.

== Major coverages ==
During the period of British rule, the local media covered major events in newspapers and magazines. The regional language newspapers wrote on numerous subjects such as speeches of Gandhi, freedom activists, leaders, including the speeches of Indian National Congress and the trial of Bhagat Singh were the main topics among others. Major newspapers and magazines were banned following the Quit India Movement, Purna Swaraj and Salt March. When Shivaram Rajguru and Bhagat Singh threw a pamphlet and bomb on the Parliament House, the Hindustan Times wrote extensively on the subject, which became the main reason for the government to ban publishing photographs of Bhagat Singh and Rajguru in the media.

== Rise of the press ==
The first printing press was established in the 18th century when the first newspaper The Bengal Gazette was launched in 1780 by James Augustus Hicky, which later became known as Hicky's Gazette. Prior to this, the British residents in the subcontinent initially started producing the weeklies and then dailies newspapers. In the mid-19th century, newspapers begun circulate in few cities, and later they started publishing in major provinces such as Madras, Bombay and Delhi, which later became the centres of publishing. Initially, the media used to wrote only in English language, however the regional language editorials also increased gradually. The first newspaper published in Indian language was the Samachar Darpan, a Bengali language newspaper which started around 1818. Later, the subcontinent saw a range of newspapers, including Bombay Samachar, the first Gujarati language newspaper was launched around 1822. At that time, Hindi language newspapers were not running until Samachar Sudha Varshan came into existence around 1854, the first Hindi language newspaper. Later, the more newspapers and magazines were launched in different regional language such as Malayalam, Marathi, Tamil, Urdu, Telugu, accompanied by other journals. The British Indian government banned all publications written in regional languages citing "vernaculars". It is believed political leaders, reformers and underground resistance groups produced numerous newspapers and magazines following the Indian Rebellion of 1857. They spread their opinions through pamphlets, printed books, journals and newsletters. The government regarded regional language editorials "worried", and hence they enforced Vernacular Press Act 1878 in an attempt to stop local language editorials, which later became known as "Gagging Act". In 1909, Newspaper Act was introduced before the Indian Press Act 1910 was brought into effect, designed to add had all features of Vernacular Press Act 1878.

== Books ==
- Sethi, Devika (2019). War Over Words: Censorship in India, 1930-1960. Cambridge University Press. p. 325. ISBN 978-1-1084-8424-4.

== See also ==
- Freedom of the press in India
- Freedom of expression in India
- Freedom of the press in Pakistan
- Mass media in Bangladesh
