= Thacker, Spink & Company =

Indian publishing house and bookseller

Thacker, Spink & Company was an Indian publishing house, bookshop, stationers and printers headquartered in Calcutta (now Kolkata), India. It was founded in 1851 and issued books of Indian interest for both the general public and the educational market as well as a range of journals, maps and postcards. The firm published Rudyard Kipling's first two books in 1886 and 1888.

== Company history ==
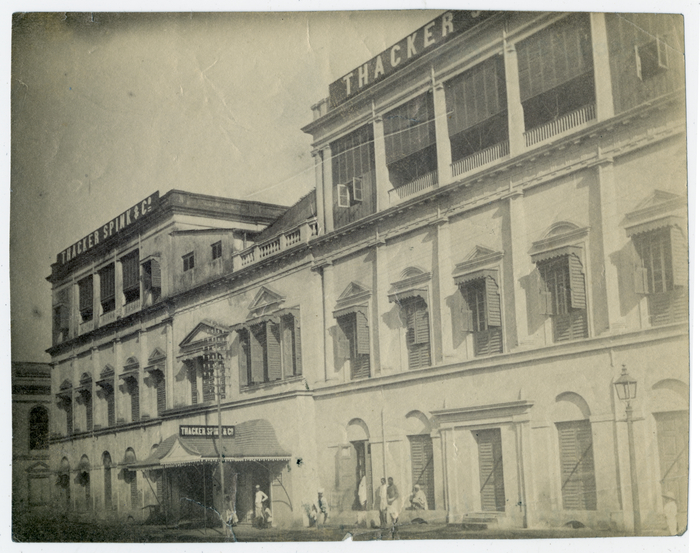
Exterior view of the building of Thacker, Spink & Co., publishers, Calcutta (Kolkata), c.1890

Thacker, Spink & Co. (operated by an East India Company surgeon William Thacker in partnership with his nephew William Spink, JP, of Calcutta) was the Indian branch of William Thacker & Co. of 2, Newgate Street, London and it also had a branch, Thacker and Co., in Bombay (now Mumbai) and another at Simla. The firm succeeded an earlier publishing firm, Thacker and Company, which traded in Calcutta under its proprietor William Thacker (1791–1872) from circa 1818 until 1851.

In 1878 Thacker, Spink was located at "5 and 6, Government Place, Calcutta" (in the vicinity of the Esplanade, Kolkata). Evan Cotton states that the firm remained at Government Place North until 1916 when it removed to a palatial "five storey block" at No. 3 Esplanade East. This is confirmed by Montague Massey. However, Abhijit Gupta has stated that in the 1880s the firm moved to College Street, Calcutta, which was then and remains the centre of the city's book trade, with its neighbours including the Calcutta School-Book Society, Ishwar Chandra Vidyasagar's Sanskrit Press and Depository, S. K. Lahiri and Gurudas Chattopadhyay.

Thacker, Spink published Thacker's Bengal Directory from 1864 until 1884, whose coverage included the Bengal Presidency and parts of present-day Myanmar and Bangladesh. In 1885 the work was renamed Thacker's Indian Directory with a coverage of all of British India.

The firm published books for the general trade, with a "considerable list of specialized books on India, its administration, religions, topography, flora and fauna", along with travel guides, books on equestrianism, cookery, and other popular nonfiction topics. It also had "an extensive list of law books and text books". It launched Peary Charan Sarkar's Books of Reading (Reading Books), a book series for the Indian school market. In 1875 the British publisher, Macmillan & Company, realizing the increasingly profitable market of textbook publishing in India, acquired the series from Thacker, Spink.

Thacker, Spink published Rudyard Kipling's first books, Departmental Ditties and Other Verses (1886) and Plain Tales from the Hills (1888).

Thacker, Spink's staff over the years included Tom Thacker who corresponded with Kipling and Edmund Hunt Dring (1863–1928), who later became managing director of Bernard Quaritch Ltd., Antiquarian Booksellers, London.

In 1931, the British firm, William Thacker & Co., was declared bankrupt, and Thacker, Spink & Company passed into the ownership of the Sengupta family.

== Book series ==
- Calcutta Oriental Series
- The Commando Books
- The Rampart Library of Good Reading
- Thacker's Dumpy Books for Children
- Thacker's Handbooks of Hindostan
- Thacker's Indian Albums

== Journals ==
Journals being published by Thacker, Spink in 1905 included:

- The Agricultural Journal of India
- The Empress
- The Indian and Eastern Engineer
- The Indian Medical Gazette
- The Journal of Tropical Veterinary Science
