= Karmakar =

Bengali Hindu caste

Karmakar (Bengali: কর্মকার) is a Bengali Hindu caste spread throughout West Bengal, Assam, Tripura and Bangladesh. The Karmakars are traditionally blacksmiths by trade.

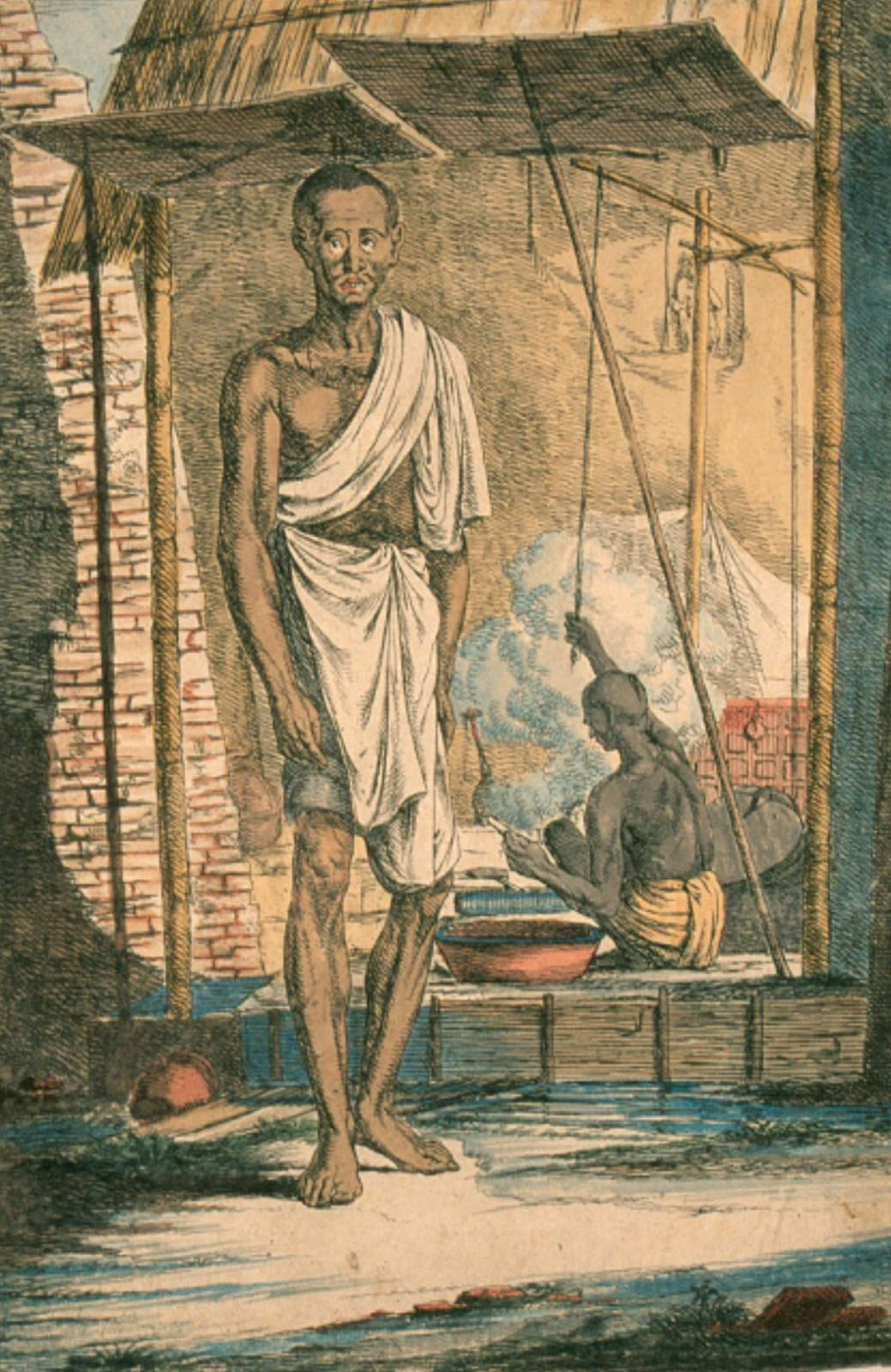
Kamar blacksmith, from a 1799 collection of etchings

== History ==
The Karmakars used to be blacksmiths by profession. Over time, the Karmakars have produced engineering masterpieces. In 1637, Janardan Karmakar (Blacksmith) of Sylhet built the great gun of Murshidabad, the Jahan Kosha Cannon 'Destroyer of the World', which is 18 feet (5.5 m) in length and weighs around 7 tons. Another grand cannon named Dal Madal Kaman was built by Jagannath Karmakar in 1565 for the kingdom of Mallabhum. In the late 18th century, Wiiliam Carey of serampore teamed up with Panchanan Karmakar to make Bengali wooden types.

== Notables ==
- Radhu Karmakar (1919–1993), cinematographer and film director
- Narendra Karmarkar (b. 1956), Indian mathematician, He developed Karmarkar's algorithm.
- Prokash Karmakar (1933–2014), artist
- Romuald Karmakar (b. 1965), French and German film director
- Joydeep Karmakar (b. 1979), sports shooter
- Prasanta Karmakar (b. 1980), swimmer
- Dipa Karmakar (b. 1993), gymnast
- Panchanan Karmakar (d. 1804), inventor of the Bangla Font
- Tamalika Karmakar (b. 1970), actress and national award winner
- Kalidas Karmakar (b. 1946), noted artist and Ekushey Padak laureate
- Vidyadhar Karmakar (b.1925), actor

== Bibliography ==
- Dasgupta, Gautam Kumar; Biswas, Samira; Mallik, Rabiranjan (2009), Heritage Tourism: An Anthropological Journey to Bishnupur, A Mittal Publication, p. 55, ISBN 978-8183242943
