= Andrew Otis =

American author

- Born: 1989; USA
- Education: University of Rochester (BA)
- Occupation: Author
- Writing career
- Period: 2018-Present
- Genre: non-fiction
- Subjects: Journalism, India
- Notable work: Hicky's Bengal Gazette: the Untold Story of India's First Newspaper (2018)
- Notable awards: 2014 Fulbright Fellowship; 2019 Ray Hiebert History of Journalism Endowed Award
- Website: andrewotis.com

Andrew Otis is an American writer and journalist. Otis is considered an expert on journalism and the early print history of Bengal.

He wrote Hicky's Bengal Gazette: the Untold Story of India's First Newspaper which details the story of James Augustus Hicky and Hicky's Bengal Gazette's struggle for a free press in 18th century India. It received positive reviews and was listed as one of the best books of the year by the Asian Review of Books.

Hicky's Bengal Gazette: the Untold Story of India's First Newspaper is the product of five years of work, including two years of research.

He currently resides in Washington, D.C.
