= The Bengal Hurkaru and Chronicle =

English-language newspaper published in British India

- Front page of Bengal Hurkaru from Friday, 30 October 1829
- Type: Daily newspaper
- Founder(s): Hugh Boyd
- Founded: 19 February 1795
- Language: English
- Ceased publication: December 1866
- Headquarters: Calcutta
- Country: India

The Bengal Hurkaru and Chronicle (often abbreviated Bengal Hurkaru) was an English-language newspaper published in Calcutta, British India, from 1795 to 1866.

The paper was originally named The Bengal Hurkaru, but after its absorption of another Calcuttan paper, The Bengal Chronicle, in 1827, the named was changed. The paper's name uses the Bengali word hurkaru, which derives from the Persian harkara (messenger).

The newspaper started out as a weekly, but became a daily on 29 April 1819. Most of the circulation was among the British military, merchants, and civil workforce, but a few subscribers came from the Bengali community as well. The paper absorbed Scotsman in the East in 1825, The Bengal Chronicle in 1827, and, finally, The India Gazette in 1834.

== See also ==
- Early phase of printing in Calcutta
