= List of Urdu book publishing companies =

Incomplete list

This list containing all the companies who publish the books and magazines in Urdu language.

== C ==
- Calcutta School-Book Society, India

== D ==
- Darussalam Publishers, Pakistan and Saudi Arabia

== F ==
- Ferozsons, Pakistan

== I ==
- India Book House, India
- Islamic Publishing House, India

== M ==
- Mayapuri Magazine, India

== S ==
- Sang-e-Meel Publications, Pakistan
