= Old Mission Church, Kolkata =

Church in Kolkata

Old Mission Church is the oldest Protestant Church, and the second oldest church in Kolkata. The Church is situated at R. N Mukherjee Road in Kolkata, in the Indian state of West Bengal.

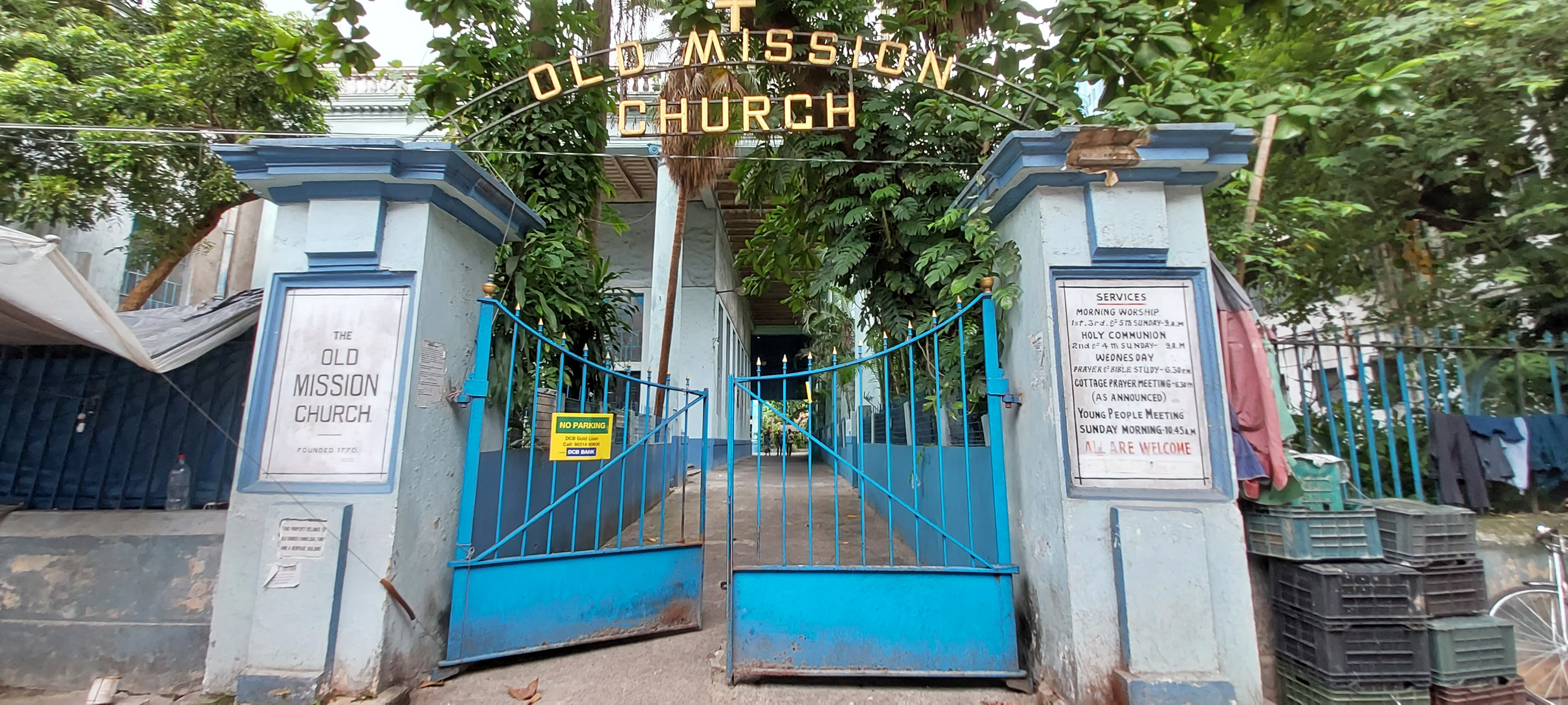
Front gate of Old Mission Church

== History ==
Lord Clive invited John Zachariah Kiernander, a Swedish Lutheran missionary from south India to settle in Kolkata to promote Christian knowledge. Kiernander started the construction of the church in 1767, and completed the Old Mission Church in 1770. Initially the church was known as Lal Girja (Red Church).

== See also ==
- David Brown (East India Company chaplain)
- Michael Madhusudan Dutt

== Exteranal links ==
- Media related to Old Mission Church, Kolkata at Wikimedia Commons
