= The Calcutta Chronicle and General Advertiser =

The Calcutta Chronicle and General Advertiser was a weekly English-language newspaper published in Kolkata (then Calcutta), the capital of British India. It was one of the earliest newspapers in colonial India and was published for four years until it stopped its publication under pressure from the East India Company. Two Englishmen, Daniel Stuart and Joseph Cooper, founded the newspaper and also set up the Chronicle Printing Press. A large portion of the newspaper was dedicated to advertisements, and therefore was also called the 'General Advertiser'.

== History ==
Stuart and Cooper started printing the Calcutta Chronicle and General Advertiser on January 26, 1786, in Calcutta after arriving from England. At that time, another newspaper, Hicky's Bengal Gazette, had already been established and several other newspapers were also coming into play. Six years after Hicky's Bengal Gazette was established, four weekly newspapers (including The Calcutta Chronicle and General Advertiser) and one monthly magazine were being published in Calcutta. The proprietor of the newspaper, William Baillie, had come to India as a cadet in the Bengal Infantry in 1777. The printing took place in the Chronicle Printing Press which was situated in Council House Street.

=== Notable announcements ===
The Calcutta Chronicle and General Advertiser contained the first announcement of Thomas Daniell's "Views in Calcutta", a rare set of twelve etched and aquatinted views of Calcutta. The July 17, 1786, issue of the Calcutta Chronicle announced Daniell's intention to publish a set of views of the city. Daniell, along with his nephew William, was likely teaching himself the new art of aquatint engraving when he undertook these views, which were hand coloured by local artists under his supervision. This announcement came only a few months after the Daniells reached India.

=== Suppression ===
The newspaper was published for four years until 1790 when the East India Company withdrew its license. The company stated that the newspaper violated press rules and that the "contents of the Calcutta Chronicle having been for sometime past highly disrespectful to the government".

== Form and content ==
Readership of the newspaper spread from Calcutta to parts of India as far as Madras (present Chennai). The circulation was carried out through free postage facilities. During the colonial period, most newspapers collected subscription fees on a half yearly basis, with the exception of the Calcutta Chronicle. However, after 31 January 1788, when the British government ordered "equalized" charges for all newspapers—making it costlier for subscribers—Stuart and Cooper had to introduce the six month charge. This started from the third volume of the newspaper, which had articles concerning the British Senate, East India Company, and its activities. In addition, marriages, births, and deaths were listed in alphabetical order.

A separate column included information regarding the military register. The transfer of every soldier from one battalion to another was reported and also mentioned were places to which several military troops were marching. Most of the news concerned the British people.

== Surviving collections ==
Five archives are known to have collections (all incomplete) of Stuart and Cooper's Calcutta Chronicle and General Advertiser:

1. British Library
2. Villanova University
3. University of Toronto
4. British Museum
5. National Library of India
