= Thacker's Indian Directory =

The Thacker's Bengal Directory was published from 1864 to 1884 by Thacker, Spink & Company, a well-known Kolkata publishing company. It covered the Bengal Presidency – which included the present day Myanmar and Bangladesh. From 1885 the Directory covered the whole of British India and was renamed Thacker's Indian Directory. It was later owned by Maharaja of Darbhanga. It continued to be published until 1960.

The directory was essentially an almanac which listed British and Foreign Merchants and Manufacturers, Commercial Industries, Army, railway and government departments and office holders, European residents, and separately, prominent non-European residents. Earlier editions of Thacker had street directories of major cities, such as Kolkata and Yangon, together with the name of the residents of each house.

Similar directories published included:

- Thacker's Bombay Directory, city and island... (Together with a directory of the chief industries of Bombay, etc.)
- Thacker's Medical Directory of India, Burma and Ceylon. (Thacker's Indian Medical Directory.)
- Thacker's Directory of the Chief Industries of India, Burma and Ceylon.
