= James Augustus Hicky =

Irish journalist (1740-1802)

Printer of Hicky's Bengal Gazette
- In office 29 January 1780 – 23 March 1782

Personal details
- Born: c. 1740 Ireland
- Died: October 1802

James Augustus Hicky was an Irishman who launched the first printed newspaper in India, Hicky's Bengal Gazette.

== Early life ==
Hicky was born in Ireland around the year 1740. While young, he moved to London to apprentice with William Faden, a Scottish printer. However, Hicky never took his freedom from the printers' guild, and instead secured a clerkship with an English lawyer, William Davy. At some point Hicky quit his career in law, and, after a brief attempt practicing as a surgeon in London, he boarded an East Indiaman as a surgeon's mate bound for Calcutta in 1772.

Upon landing in Calcutta, Hicky practiced as both a surgeon and a merchant, shipping and trading goods along India's coast. But, by 1776, his shipping business collapsed as his vessel returned to port with its cargo badly damaged. Unable to reassure his creditors, Hicky entered debtors' prison in October 1776.

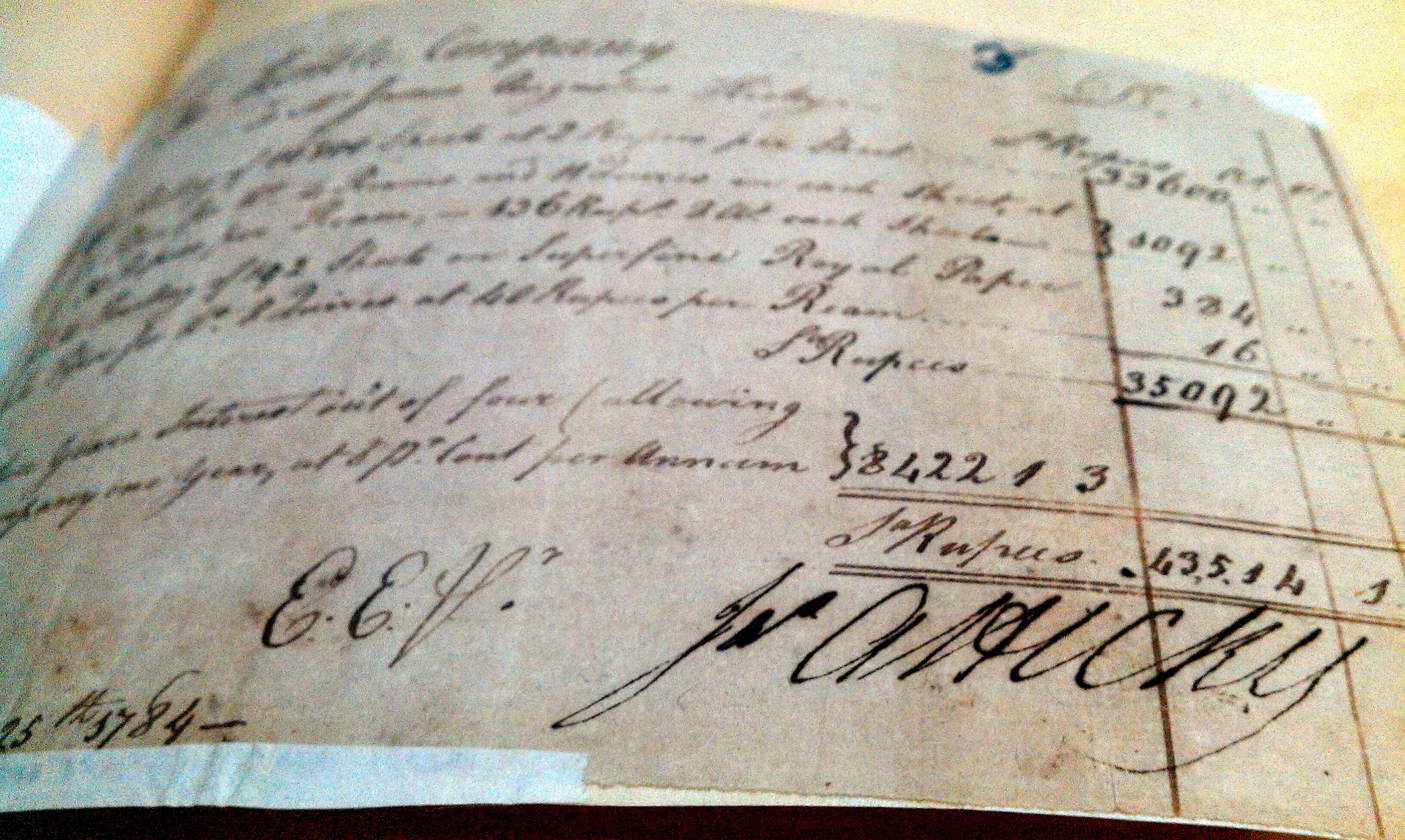
James Augustus Hicky's Bill to the East India Company for a printing job

While in jail, Hicky acquired a printing press and types and by 1777 began a printing business from jail. In 1778, Hicky hired Lawyer William Hickey (no relation) to get rid of his debts and free him from jail.

== Hicky's Bengal Gazette ==
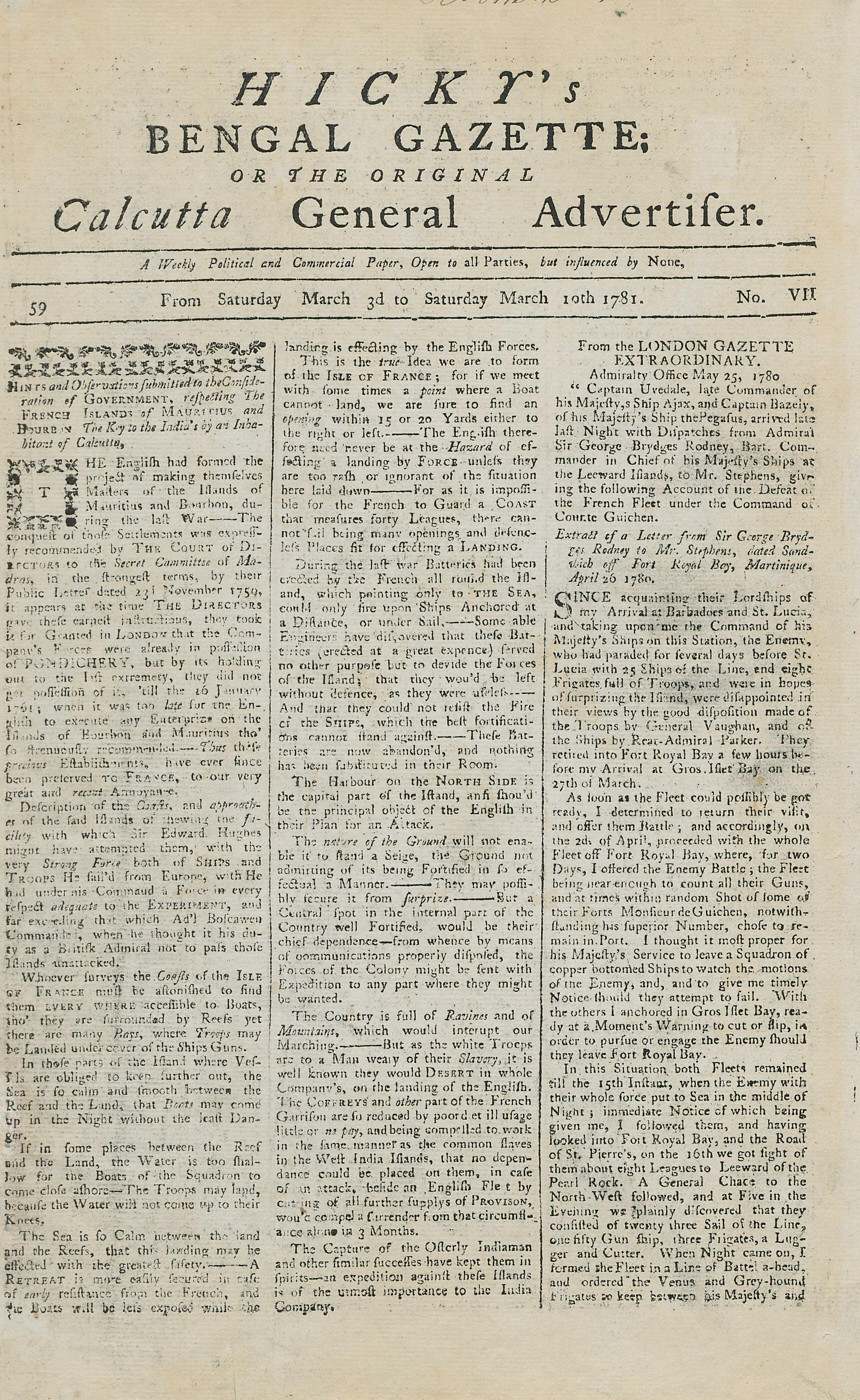
Front page of Hicky's Bengal Gazette, 10 March 1781, from the University of Heidelberg's archives.

Hicky began publication of Hicky's Bengal Gazette on 29 January 1780. Hicky first maintained a neutral editing policy but after he learned that other men were about to bring a rival newspaper, The India Gazette, to market, he accused an East India Company employee, Simeon Droz of supporting the India Gazette's editors because he had refused to pay a bribe to Droz and Marian Hastings,Warren Hastings' wife. In retaliation for Hicky's accusation, Hastings' Supreme Council forbid Hicky from mailing his newspaper through the post office. Hicky claimed Hastings' order violated his right to free expression, and accused Hastings of corruption, tyranny, and even erectile dysfunction. Hicky also accused other British leaders in Calcutta of corruption, including the Chief Justice of the Supreme Court of Judicature at Fort William, Elijah Impey, and the leader of the Protestant Mission, Johann Zacharias Kiernander. Hicky's editorial independence was short-lived as Hastings and Kiernander sued him for libel. After four dramatic trials in June 1781, the Supreme Court found Hicky guilty and sentenced him to jail. Hicky continued to print his newspaper from jail and continued to accuse Hastings and other of corruption. He was finally shuttered when Hastings instituted fresh lawsuits against him. Hicky's Bengal Gazette ceased publication on 30 March 1782 when its types were seized by an order of the Supreme Court of Judicature at Fort William

== Later life ==
Hicky was freed from jail about Christmas 1784, when Warren Hastings, about to embark to England to face impeachment, forgave his debts. Little is known about Hicky's later life, except that his health was ruined after three years in jail, and that he lived in poverty. Hicky died on a boat to China in October 1802.

== Legacy ==
Although his newspaper was disliked by the then Governor-General of India, Warren Hastings, Hicky paved the way and influenced multiple Indians to start newspapers. Hicky's printing office was the training ground for many later printers who went on to found their own newspapers, leading to a vibrant newspaper scene in Bengal. No images of Hicky survive to this day. However, his signature and handwriting can be found on old documents.
