= The India Gazette =

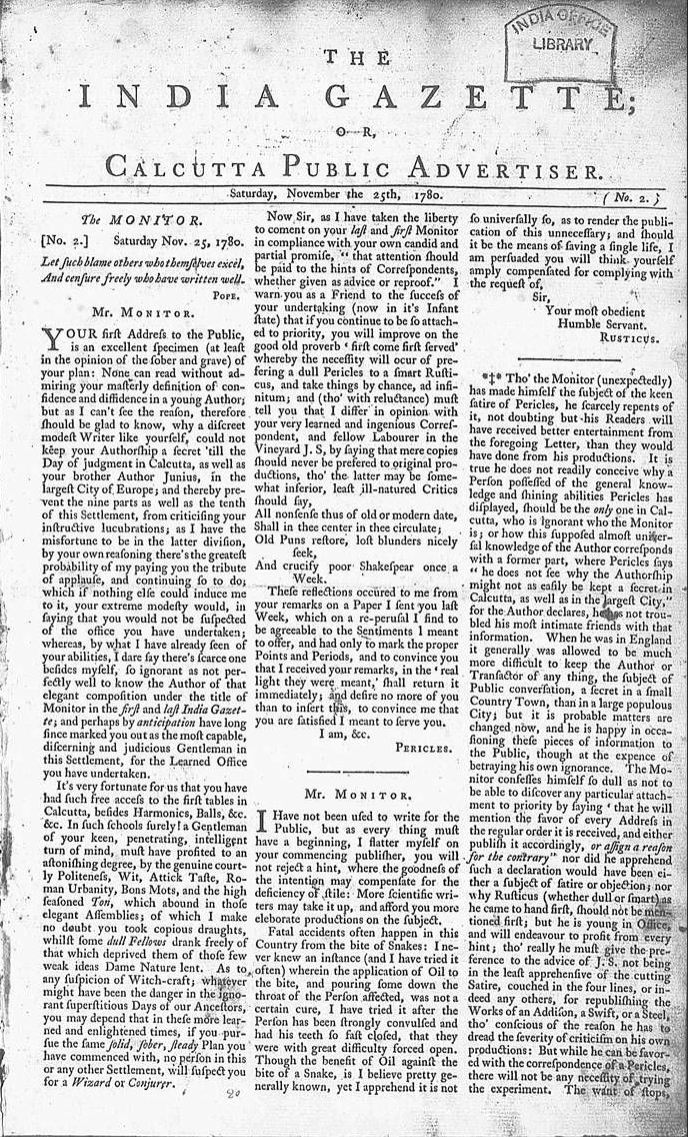
- Front page of the India Gazette (25 November 1780)
- Type: Weekly newspaper
- Publisher: Bernard Messink and Peter Reed
- Founded: 18 November 1780
- Headquarters: Kolkata, British India
- Country: British India

The India Gazette; or, Calcutta Public Advertiser was an English language weekly newspaper published in Calcutta (now Kolkata), then capital of British India. It was the second newspaper printed in India.

== Overview ==
Founded by Bernard Messink and Peter Reed, two East India Company employees, the paper was a strong supporter of the administration of the Governor General Warren Hastings, and a rival to India's first newspaper Hicky's Bengal Gazette. It was founded on 18 November 1780.
