= Prasanta Karmakar =

Indian swimmer

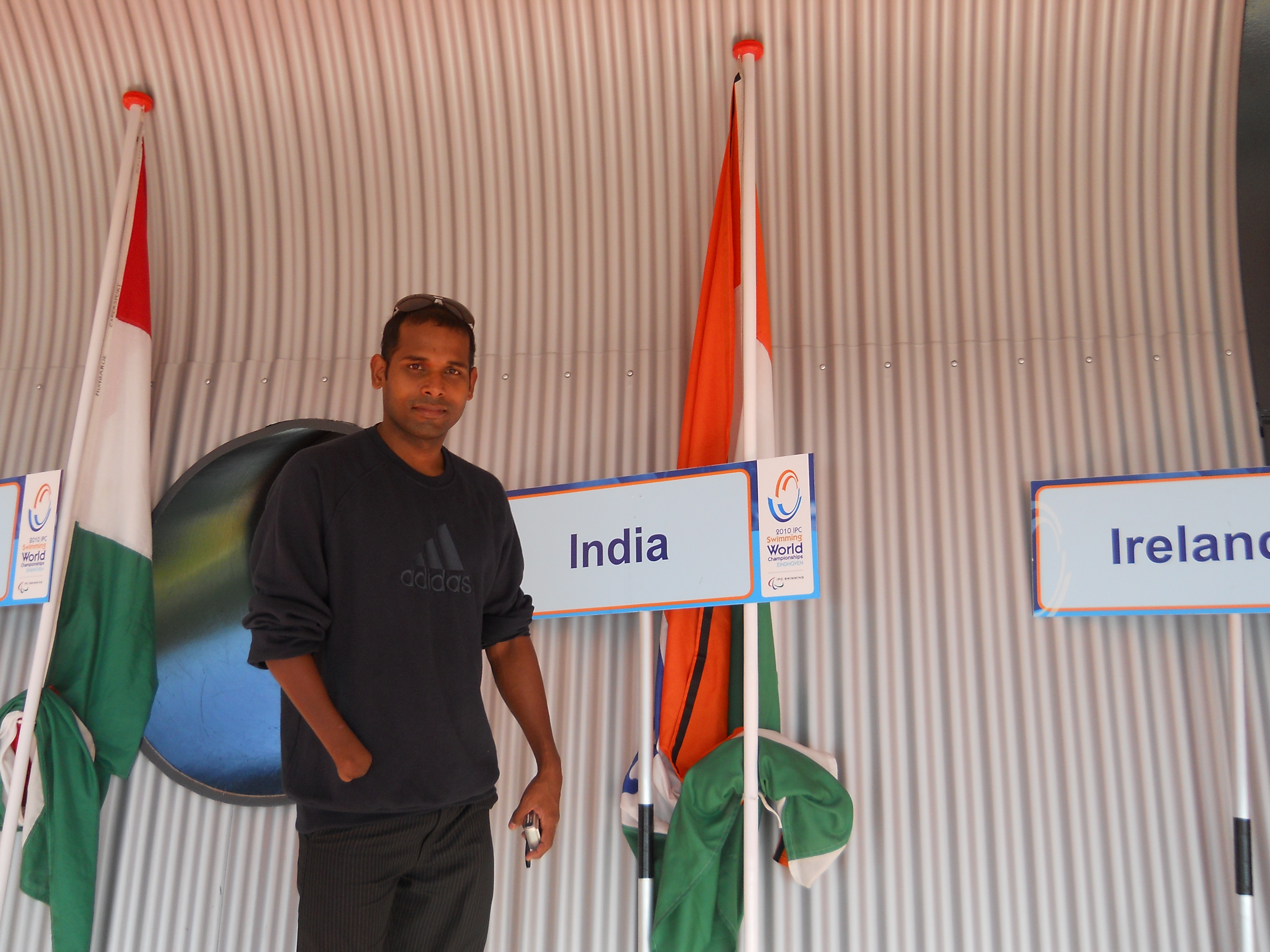
- Prasanta at IPC Swimming World Championships.

Personal information
- Nationality: India
- Born: 1980 or 1981 (age 45–46) Kolkata, West Bengal, India Present Address = Bhiwani, Haryana.

Sport
- Sport: Swimming
- Strokes: Freestyle, Butterfly, Backstroke, Individual Medley
Medal record
Men's swimming
Representing India
Commonwealth Games
Bronze medal – third place	2010 Delhi	50 metre freestyle S9
Asian Para Games
Silver medal – second place	2010 Guangzhou	50m Freestyle
Bronze medal – third place	2010 Guangzhou	200m Individual Medley

Prasana Karmakar is an Indian Para swimmer. He won 2 Bronze medals in 2014 Incheon Asian Games. He is also known for representing India as the swimming team coach for 2016 RIO Paralympic games.

== Early life ==
He was born in 1980 or 1981 in Kolkata, West Bengal.

== Career ==
He is an Arjuna Awardee, Major Dhyan Chand Sports Awardee, Bhim Awardee, Kolkata Shree Awardee, State Role Model Awardee, Super Idol Awardee, Positive Health Hero Awardee, Achiever Awardee, Limca Book Record Holder, Swimmer of the year Award 2010, 2011, 2014. In 2003, Karmakar became the first disabled swimmer to represent India and win a medal at the World Swimming Championships in Argentina. Karmakar is known to be the Indian swimmer at the 2009 IWAS World Games held in Bangalore winning 4 Gold, 2 Silver and 1 Bronze medal.

At the 2010 Commonwealth Games in Delhi, he won a bronze medal which was India's first ever medal in aquatics at the Commonwealth Games. In the 2010 Asian Para Games in Guangzhou in China, he won a silver medal at 50m Freestyle and a bronze medal in the 200m Individual Medley. Prasanta also won a bronze in the 50m Backstroke in the S9 category at the 2010 International German Swimming Championships for Athletes with a Disability in Berlin, Germany. Karmakar won 2 bronze medal in 2014 Incheon Asian Para games in 100 meter Breast stroke and 4 × 100meter freestyle relay. It was reported that Karmakar opted out of the Paralympics in London to make way for Sharath Gayakwad.

In March 2018, Karmakar was suspended for three years by Paralympic Committee of India for reportedly capturing video clips of female swimmers.

He is the Paralympic swimming Asian record holder in 50m Butterfly, 50m Breaststroke and 50m Backstroke and also is the Paralympic National Record holder in four events – 50m Freestyle, 100m Freestyle, 100m Backstroke and 200m Individual Medley. Having achieved success at the Commonwealth Games and Asian Games. Karmakar has been coached by Pradeep Kumar in Bangalore.

== Achievements ==
- National champion for 16 consecutive years,
- Only Indian Commonwealth Games medalist 2010
- 2006, 2010 and 2014 Asian Games medalist,
- Only Indian Athlete world games 7 medalist 2009,
- Only Indian swimmer made 3 Asian records 2010,
- First Indian World Swimming Championship Medalist 2003,
- International swimmer for over 13 years representing India and winning 44 medals,
- Only swimmer in India to win medal in Asian Cycling Championship 2013.
- First coach in Indian Paralympic Swimming Team at Rio Paralympic Games 2016.

== Awards and accolades ==
- Arjuna Award 2011,
- Major Dhyan Chand Sports Award 2015,
- Bhiem Award 2014,
- Kolkata Shree Award 2010,
- Role Model Award 2005,
- Super Idol Award 2011,
- Positive Health Hero Award 2012,
- Swimmer of the year Award 2009, 2011
- Achiever Award 2015.
- He was supported by GoSports Foundation, a sports non profit organisation that aims to promote sporting excellence in India.
