= Calcutta School-Book Society =

Organization in Calcutta, British India, with aims of publishing text books

The Calcutta School-Book Society was an organisation based in Kolkata during the British Raj. It was established in 1817 by David Hare, with the aim of publishing text books and supplying them to schools and madrasas in India.

== Background ==
In 1814, four years before the establishment of the Calcutta School Society and three years before the formation of the Calcutta School-Book Society, the London Missionary Society, under the supervision of Robert May, set up 36 elementary schools in Chinsurah, West Bengal, India (now Chunchura).

Fort William College was created in 1800 by Lord Wellesley, the Governor-General at the time. A growing eagerness and enthusiasm towards education led to the translation and printing of the Bible in Sanskrit, Bengali, Assamese and Oriya. Scholars like Mrityunjay Vidyalankar and Ramram Basu did the work with foreign language experts and alongside, the Ramayana, Mahabharata and other Indian epics were skilfully translated into different languages. The Calcutta School-Book Society followed a similar path and helped Bengali prose writers achieve national and international acclaim. As a result of rise of widespread higher education, journalism became a major component of British society, with magazines like the Magazine for Indian Youth and newspapers like the Samachar Darpan (The News Mirror) becoming a widespread phenomenon. Mass education, however, came much later in 1885 with the Hunter Education Commission, which ended James Long's and other missionary organisations' zealous ideas of dissipating education among the masses, in an expression of the continuing battle for superiority of the British over the natives.

To strengthen their political colonisation of India, the British strategised emotional and intellectual colonisation and, in the Charter of 1833, announced English as the official language of British India. This ideology had at its fulcrum, Thomas Babington Macaulay’s assertion of the British ideology that Western learning was superior to Oriental languages and indigenous Sanskrit and other vernacular knowledge. The setting up of several colleges in Calcutta, India, namely the Hindu College in 1816 and the Sanskrit College in 1824, portrays this shift of emphasis from the study of Oriental languages in Fort William College to the establishment of the English language, ensuring that all Indian students studying in these new colleges and schools, which were developed under the Calcutta School Society (1818), had to learn English whether they liked it or not.

In the shadow of this shift in cultural paradigm, the Calcutta School-Book Society also known as the Calcutta Book Society, was instituted on 4 July 1817, in Calcutta (now known as Kolkata), the then capital of the British Empire. The society was set up under the patronage of Lord Marquess of Hastings who was Governor-General at that point of time. The School-Book Society was set up with the coming of Western methods in education to India and henceforth, the rising demand for textbooks and dictionaries. The society also encouraged the establishment of new elementary schools. The Calcutta School Society, an educational institution independent from the School-Book Society was set up on 1 September 1818. The government established it with a sole aim 'to endorse education beyond the curriculum' and to introduce similar teaching techniques at different schools and to develop, build or reconstruct old and new schools. The Calcutta School-Book Society on the other hand aimed at publishing textbooks for these new schools and other institutions of higher learning.

== People ==
The Calcutta School-Book Society in the years after being set up in 1817, constituted of a managing committee of sixteen Europeans members and eight Indians. Some eminent people included amongst others were Mrityunjay Vidyalankar, Tarini Charan Mitra, Radhakanta Deb, Ram Comul Sen and Moulvi Aminullah. Mrityunjay and Tarini Charan, who was also one of the secretaries along with Mr. F. Irving, were teachers at the Fort William College and Radhakanta Deb was a philanthropist from Calcutta. These few people shaped what would be the beginning of the "Bengal Renaissance".

Mrityunjay Vidyalankar (c. 1762–1819) was a pundit and scholar, born in the Midnapore district. He studied in the Natore district, now in Bangladesh, and also in Calcutta. He was fluent in both Sanskrit and Bengali. After receiving a recommended from Sir William Carey, one of the foremost Protestant missionaries in India in the early 19th century, he joined the Department of Bengali at Fort William College as the head pundit. He was appointed Professor of Sanskrit in 1805, four years after he joined the college. In 1813, he resigned from his job. He then worked under Justice Sir Francis Mackonton as a judge pundit. He was a committee member that was constituted to formulate the rules for the Hindu College in 1816 before becoming the member of the governing body of the Calcutta School-Book Society in 1817. Prior to Rammohan Roy's efforts, Mrityunjay argued forcefully against sati. Together, they developed an intellectual argument against sati, arguing that the ultimate goal for both Hindu men and women was to become one with the divine.

Tarini Charan Mitra (c. 1772 – 1837) was a famous Bengali prose writer and the head munshi at the Department of Hindoostanee Language at Fort William College. Tarinicharan taught in Fort William College from 1801 to 1830. He was fluent in several languages like Persian, English, Urdu, Hindi, Arabic and Bengali. He was the secretary and a managing committee member of the Calcutta School Book Society. Tarinicharan Mitra worked against the anti-Sati movement for a conservative organisation called Dharma Sabha (1830). He wrote favourably about the Sati Pratha. Radhakanta Deb and Ram Comul Sen collaborated with him to produce a translation of Aesop’s fables, titled Nitikatha, into Bengali.

Ram Comul Sen (1783–1844) was born in Hooghly district and was the son of a Persian scholar. Famous as a scholar, writer and lexicographer, Ram Comul Sen worked in Dr William Hunter’s Hindustanee Printing Press as a compositor in 1804 before becoming its manager in 1811. He was also an accountant at both the Asiatic Society and the Sanskrit College. Ram Comul became the secretary of the Asiatic Society and also held the post of superintendent of the Sanskrit College in 1835. Amongst his other illustrious posts, he was the principal of the Hindu College in 1821 and a dewan at the Royal Calcutta Mint in 1828. He was one of the founders of the Calcutta Medical College, the only Bengali on the committee and he was the president and founding father of the Zamindar Sabha in 1838. With the permission of Dr William Carey, Ram Comul set up the Agricultural and Horticultural Centre and was influential in setting up the Calcutta Museum with the help of Dr Wallich, a Danish botanist. Apart from these, Ram Comul Sen was instrumental in the systematic eradication of social traditions like drowning dying people in the Ganges and impaling others during Chadak. He made significant contributions to the Bengali language with his compilation of a dictionary from English to Bengali working for over one and a half decades on its two volumes. His grandson, Keshav Chandra Sen, was one of the leaders of the Brahmo Samaj.

Radhakanta Deb (1784–1867) was the grandson of Maharaja Nabakrishna Deb, who was a trusted munshi to the East India Company and had received the decoration of the Knight Commander of the Star of India and his title of 'Raj Bahadur', based on merit for his service under Sir Warren Hastings and Robert Clive. Radhakanta was an accomplished scholar, and like his father Gopimohan Deb, was one of the foremost leaders of the Calcutta Hindu society. Radhakanta was fluent in Persian, Arabic and Sanskrit and also developed a good knowledge of English. He published an eight-volume dictionary of the Sanskrit language called Shabdakalpadruma, between 1822 and 1856, which met the needs of educational institutions, the court of law and students learning Sanskrit. He was also the recipient of several international awards including honours from the Royal Asiatic Society, London. Radhakanta Deb also had a keen interest in promoting elementary education and was involved as director of the Calcutta Hindu College, 1817. He was involved in establishing the Calcutta School-Book Society in 1817 and Calcutta School Society in 1818. He worked towards improving and reforming primary schools. In 1851, he was appointed the President of the British Indian Association. Radhakanta Deb was also founded the Dharma Sabha (Association in Defence of Hindu Culture), a social conservatism body that opposed Lord Bentinck’s abolishing of Sati by a government law in 1829. Radhakanta’s attitudes toward culture and intellectual development are reflected best in his publications for the Calcutta School-Book Society.

Moulvi Aminullah was a madrasa instructor at the Calcutta Madrasa which was renamed Aliyah Madrasa (or Aliah University), founded by Sir Warren Hastings in 1780.

== Achievements ==
The Calcutta School-Book Society was open to all people and the payment of a minor subscription fee was all that was needed to be a member. It had around 225 subscribers, a majority being European and a minority of them being Hindu. This lack of enthusiasm in the subscribers to the Society meant the publishing and writing of textbooks for the growing college and school market was funded by the government. By 1821, the Calcutta School-Book Society had published as many as 1,26,464 books and pamphlets in several languages which included Persian, Arabic, Urdu, Bengali, Sanskrit and English. In 1862, the society was merged with the Vernacular Literature Society where the Muslim members were assigned books and pamphlets to be written in Persian, Urdu or Arabic and Hindus were assigned Bengali and Sanskrit works. The boundaries of the Calcutta School-Book Society were however limited to the confines of the city itself.

== See also ==
- Bartholomäus Ziegenbalg
- Early Phase of Printing in Calcutta
- List of Urdu language book publishing companies
