= John Zachariah Kiernander =

Swedish missionary

Johann "John" Zachariah Kiernander
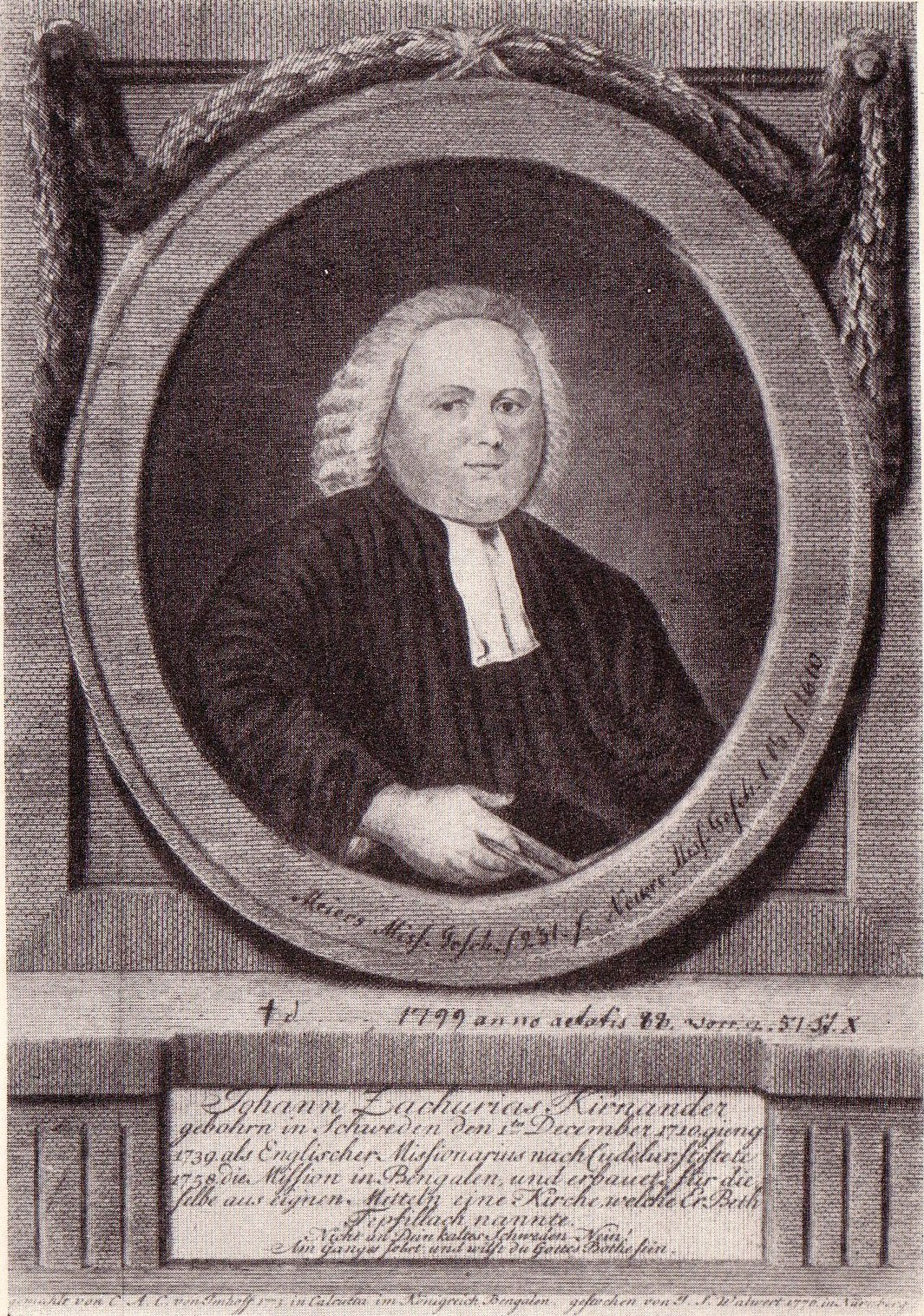

Society for the Promotion of Christian Knowledge Missionary
- In office 29 September 1758 – 1787

Personal details
- Born: 1 December 1710 Östergötland, Sweden
- Died: 10 May 1799 (aged 88) Calcutta, India
- Spouse(s): ?, Wendela Fischer, Ann Wolley
- Children: Robert William Kiernander
- Education: Franckesche Stiftungen

Johann Zacharias Kiernander Anglicised as John Zachariah Kiernander (1 December 1710 – 10 May 1799) was a Swedish Lutheran missionary who went to serve in the Halle, Tranquebar mission in southern India. He later worked in Calcutta.

== Life and work ==
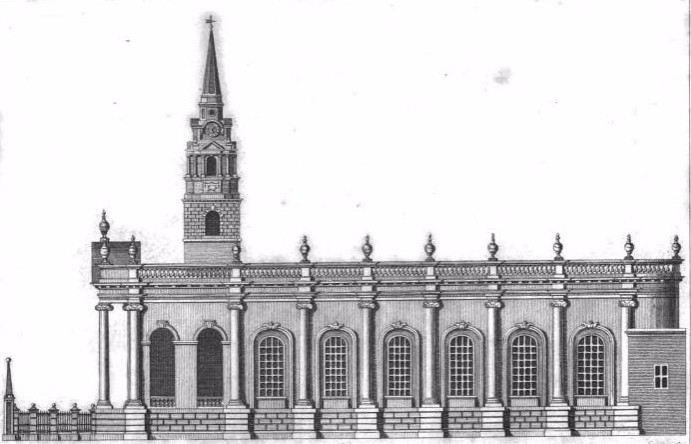
Beth-Tephillah Church founded 1770 by John Zachariah Kiernander, later the Old Mission Church, Calcutta

Kiernander was born in Akstad, Ostrogothia, Sweden and was educated at Lindkoping, then at the University of Uppsala and then at Halle. He was ordained in 1739 at London and sent to Cuddalore to serve in the Society for Promoting Christian Knowledge. He travelled aboard the ship Colchester and reached in 1740. The region saw fighting between the French and British colonists in 1758 and Cuddalore was taken by the French under Comte Lally. He then moved to the Danish settlement of Tranquebar and later went to work at the Dutch Church in Chinsurah. In 1758 he was invited by Robert Clive to move to Calcutta. He was the first Protestant Missionary to establish a base in Bengal. During his stay both at Cuddalore and at Calcutta he collected specimens of natural history which he sent to Europe. He built the Old Mission Church (or Beth Tephillah) in Calcutta and founded one of the first printing presses in Calcutta. In 1781, he accused James Augustus Hicky, the editor and publisher of Hicky's Bengal Gazette of libel and won the trial. He was the author of The Trial and Conviction of James Augustus Hicky.
