= Panchanan Karmakar =

Bengali inventor and typographer who created the first Bangla typeface

- পঞ্চানন কর্মকার
- Born: Jirat, Hooghly, Bengal Presidency, British India
- Died: 1804

Panchanan Karmakar (Mallick) (died c. 1804) was an Indian Bengali inventor, born at Tribeni, Hooghly, Bengal Presidency, British India, hailed from Serampore. He assisted Charles Wilkins in creating the first Bangla type. His metal Bengali alphabet and typeface had been used until Ishwar Chandra Vidyasagar proposed a simplified version. Apart from Bangla, Karmakar developed type in 14 languages, including Arabic, Persian, Marathi, Telugu, Burmese and Chinese.

== Early life and career ==
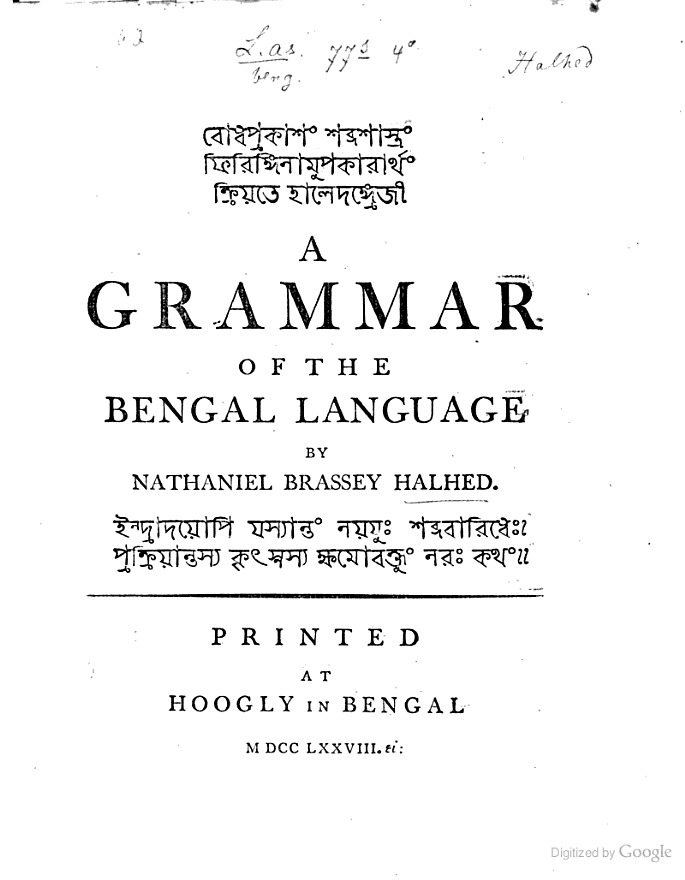
Book cover of A Grammar of the Bengal Language (1778) first printed Bengali book using Bengali font.

Karmakar was born in Tribeni. His ancestors were calligraphers; they inscribed names and decorations on copper plates, weapons, metal pots, etc. One of Panchanan Karmakar’s ancestors was known for carving designs on swords, shields and armours for one of the nawabs of Bengal, Alivardi Khan. He received the title of Mullick.

Andrews, a Christian missionary, had a printing press at Hughli. In order to print Nathaniel Brassey Halhed's A Grammar of the Bengal Language, he needed a Bangla type. Under the supervision of English typographer Charles Wilkins, Karmakar created the first Bengali typeface for printing.

In 1779, Karmakar moved to Kolkata to work for Wilkins' new printing press. In Chinsurah, Hooghly. In 1801, he developed a typeface for British missionary William Carey's Bangla translation of the New Testament. In 1803, Karmakar developed a set of Devnagari script, the first Nagari type to be developed in India.
