= Sanskrit Press and Depository =

The Sanskrit Press and Depository was set up in 1847 by Baburam, who was a teacher at Hariram College, one of the primitive colleges in east Bengal. Later, Ishwar Chandra Vidyasagar and Madan Mohan Tarkalankar with a loan of 600 rupees updated it with better machinery and work-environment .

== History ==
Vidyasagar began the Sanskrit Press with a couple of safe publishing bets: an edition of Bharat Chandra Ray's Annadamangal Kavya, a popular epic, for which his copy-text was a rare manuscript owned by the Krishnanagar zamindars, and the Betal Panchabingshati (Twenty Five Tales from a Demon), a traditional collection of Indian folk tales. Madan Mohan Tarkalankar began in 1849 an illustrated series for children, Shishu Shiksha (A Child's Lessons), the third number of which was Vidyasagar's Bodhodoy (The Dawn of Understanding, 1850). With Bodhodoy began Vidyasagar's project to reform and modernise Bengali primary education, using the Sanskrit Press as a laboratory for his experiments.

In 1855 he produced one of the most successful Bengali primers ever, the Varna Parichaya (Bengali pronunciation Borno Porichoy). This book, whose title loosely translates as "Learning One's Letters" or "An Introduction to the Bengali Alphabet", is much more than a simple alphabet book, and contains short moralistic tales, aphorisms and epigrams which quickly became proverbial in 19th century Bengal. Its purpose was to displace the ubiquitous Shishubodhak, Ballobodh, Bornobodh, etc., popular textbooks written by many hands and comprising a bizarre mix of folktales, proverbs, rules for negating curses, shlokas from the Arthashastra, and other edifying fragments. These books were barely suitable for children and were more like grab-bags of useful knowledge for the average householder. Partly swayed by influences from the 19th century England, Bengal in the mid-19th century was busy inventing childhood as a category, a difficult business in a society where children were routinely married off before puberty. Vidyasagar provided the intellectual basis for constructing a pedagogy of the child mind in Bengal, and he backed it up on the one hand with actual publishing programmes, and on the other with his campaign for widow remarriage and the raising of the age of consent.

However, in later ages Vidyasagar's style of teaching and moral aphorisms began to be regarded as stuffy and old-fashioned; this was less Vidyasagar's fault than the failure of subsequent generations to update his legacy appropriately.

== Impact ==
Another area in which Vidyasagar's experience as a printer gave him unique knowledge was in the reform of Bengali typography and printing. Vidyasagar reformed Bengali typography into an alphabet of twelve vowels and 40 consonants and grappled with the problem of "joined letters" which continues to plague typographers of Bengali in the digital age.

== See also ==
- Sanskrit revival
- List of Sanskrit universities in India
- List of Sanskrit academic institutes outside India
- List of historic Sanskrit texts
- List of Sanskrit Buddhist literature
- List of legendary creatures in Sanskrit Hindu mythology
- List of Sanskrit poets
- Sanskrit Collegiate School, Kolkata
- Symbolic usage of Sanskrit
- Sanskrit Wikipedia
