= William Hickey (memoirist) =

English lawyer and writer of memoirs (1749–1830)

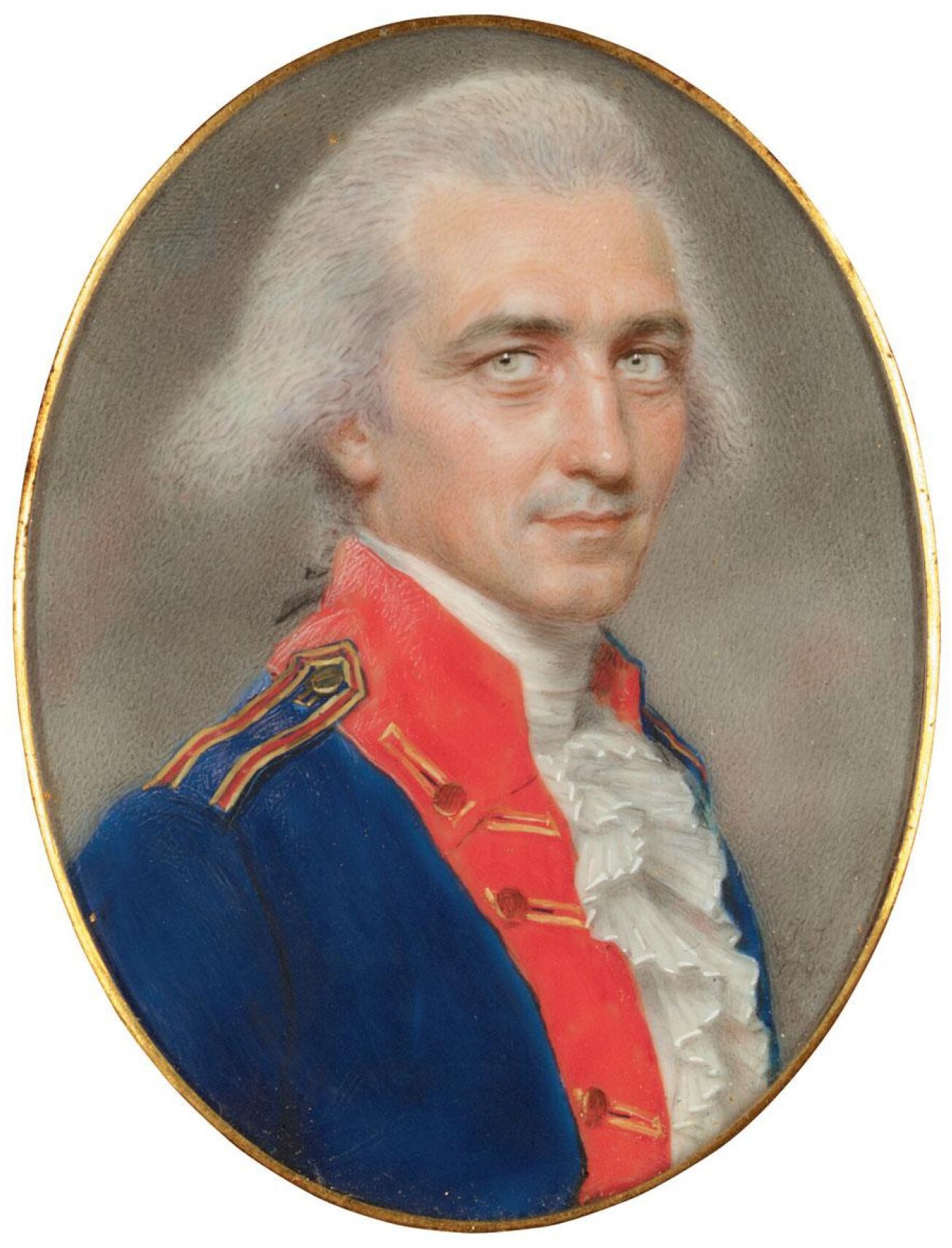
Portrait by John Smart, 1790

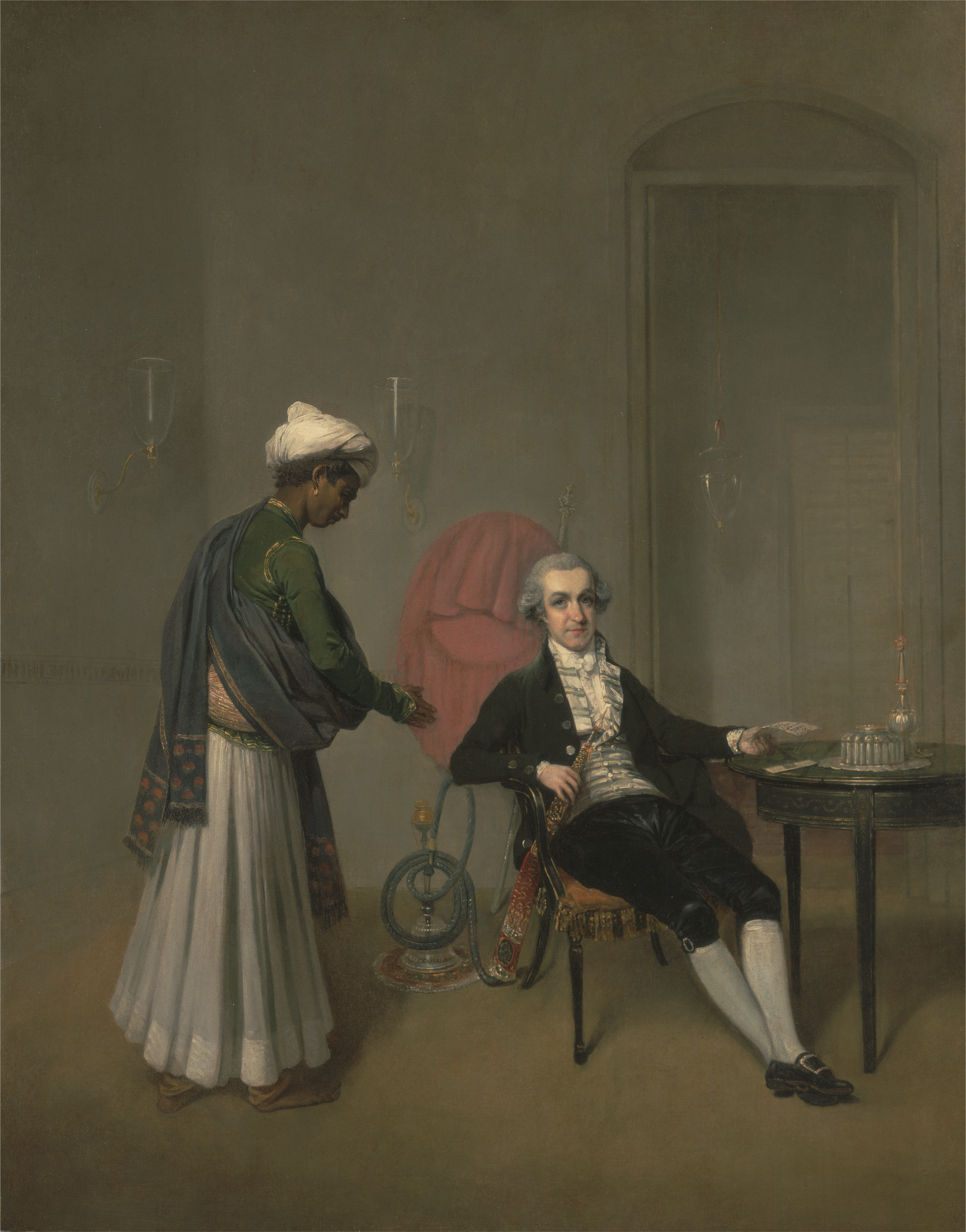
Portrait of a Gentleman, Possibly William Hickey, and an Indian Servant

William Hickey (30 June 1749 – 31 May 1830) was an English lawyer, but is best known for his vast Memoirs, composed in 1808–10 and published between 1913 and 1925, which in their manuscript form cover 750 closely-written folio pages. Described by Peter Quennell as "One of the most remarkable books of its kind ever published in the English Language", Hickey's Memoirs give an extraordinarily vivid picture of life in late 18th-century London, Calcutta, Madras and Jamaica which stands comparison with the best of his near-contemporary James Boswell.

== Early life 1749–1769 ==
Hickey was born in St. Albans Street, Pall Mall, Westminster, England, on 30 June 1749, the seventh son of Joseph Hickey, a successful Irish solicitor, and Mary Boulton, from a Yorkshire gentry family. He began his education at Westminster School, but was removed "in high disgrace" in December 1763 after neglecting his studies, frequenting public houses and leading, in his own words, a life of "idleness and dissipation". He was sent to a private school at Streatham in Surrey, where he was able to study Arithmetic, Writing, French, Drawing and Dancing in addition to the Classical Studies which had failed to engage him at Westminster.

In January 1766, he left school and began his legal training at his father's law firm, but he continued to lead an extremely debauched existence, visiting the prostitutes of Covent Garden and drinking heavily. On more than one occasion, he was caught embezzling funds from the firm; finally, his father decided to send his son to India to see if he could make good. Accordingly, Hickey embarked on the ship Plassey, a fast East Indiaman, at Dungeness on 4 January 1769.

== India and Jamaica ==
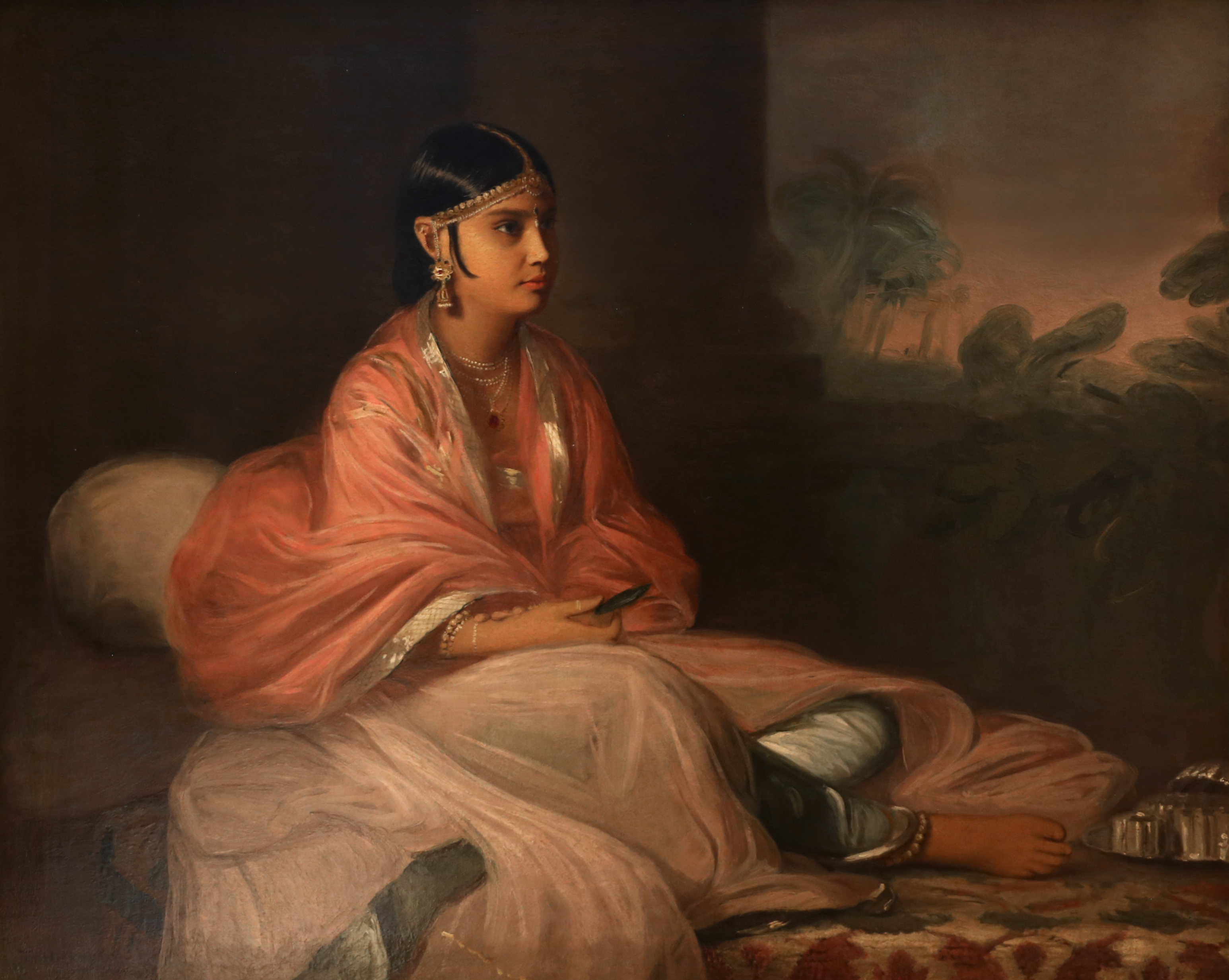
Thomas Hickey's painting An Indian Lady (Indian bibi Jemdanee), believed to depict William's Bengali partner, Jemdanee, 1787, National Gallery of Ireland, Dublin

Upon arriving in India, Hickey was expected to join the British East India Company army as an officer cadet, but he was put off when he learned that the pay was "too contemptible to afford the common necessaries of life". He got back on the Plassey to return to England. The ship travelled first to China, of which he gives an account in his memoirs. His father was less than pleased at his return and, after Hickey reverted to his old ways, sent him to Jamaica to work as a lawyer, with a warning that if he failed he could expect no further help — indeed, his father would no longer even receive him. Upon his arrival in Jamaica, Hickey discovered that there were limits imposed on the numbers of attorneys allowed to practice, and he would not be able to make a living as a lawyer there. He returned to England, "with considerable regret", leaving about five months after his arrival, on 17 April 1776, arriving back on 14 June.

Through his various connections, including Edmund Burke, he arranged to be accepted as a lawyer in Bengal, a feat which restored his father's goodwill towards him. He departed for Bengal from Portsmouth on 1 May 1777 and called in, en route, at Cape Town. On 12 November 1777 Hickey, aged 28, was "entered on the Roll" as "Solicitor, Attorney, and Proctor of the Supreme Court" in Bengal. He prospered in those roles. In April 1779 he set out to return to England, charged by the English inhabitants of Calcutta to deliver, at their expense, a petition to Parliament in England that they should be entitled to trial by jury.

In October he first met and later took up with a demi-mondaine, Charlotte Barry, who was then aged 18 and with whom he fell in love. He offered to marry her; she refused marriage, but agreed to live with him as his partner. The couple then travelled together to India when Hickey was 32 in 1783. Charlotte did not survive long, dying on Christmas Day 1783, aged 21.

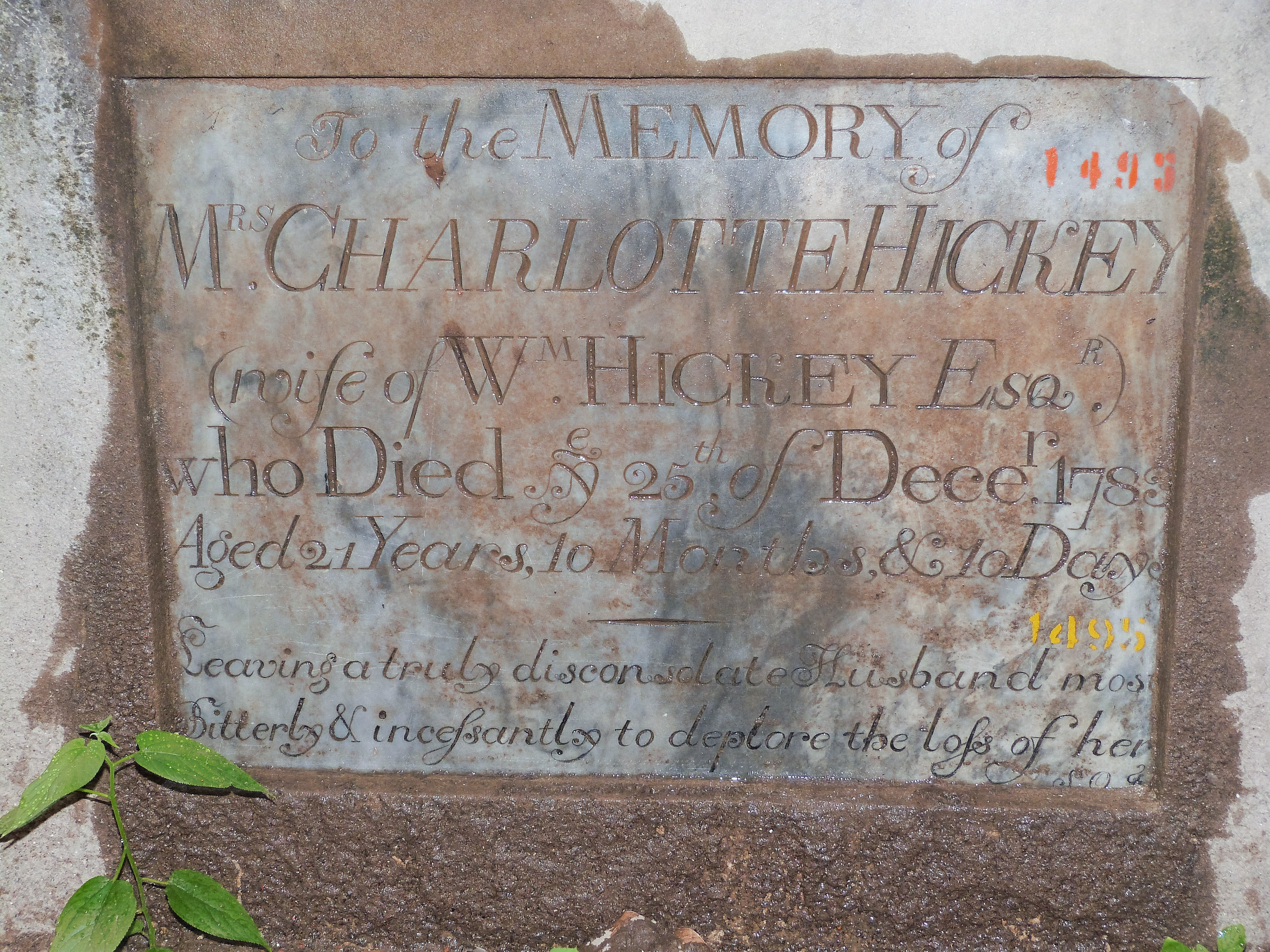
Tombstone of Charlotte Barry, here called "Mrs. Hickey", Tombstone 1495, Old English Cemetery, Park Street, Kolkata, India.

Hickey established himself in the legal profession, managing to obtain a series of lucrative posts, including Under-Sheriff and Clerk to the Chief Justice. Some while after Charlotte's death he took an Indian mistress, Jemdanee, who was locally considered to be his wife. They had a son in 1796, but Jemdanee died in childbirth. The couple's son died a few months after her.

== Retirement ==
Hickey retired to the Buckinghamshire town of Beaconsfield in late 1808, having left India after becoming ill. He brought with him "a pair of elderly unmarried sisters, his favourite Indian servant Munnoo and a large parti-coloured English dog." The dullness of what he called a "trifling" place "with a very limited society", encouraged him to occupy his mind by writing his memoirs, which eventually extended to over 700 pages of handwritten text taking his life up to 1810, at which point he stopped.

The details of his life after 1810 are sketchy, but he seems to have moved to London with his sisters, Sarah and Ann, who died in 1824 and 1826 respectively. He died in 1830.

== Editions ==
- Alfred Spencer (Ed.) The Memoirs of William Hickey (London: Hurst & Blackett) 1913–25, 4 Vols.
- Peter Quennell (Ed.) The Memoirs of William Hickey (London: Hutchinson) 1960
- Roger Hudson (Ed.) Memoirs of a Georgian Rake (London: The Folio Society) 1995

The later editions restore some coarser material that was omitted from the first publication.
