= Hicky's Bengal Gazette =

India's First Newspaper

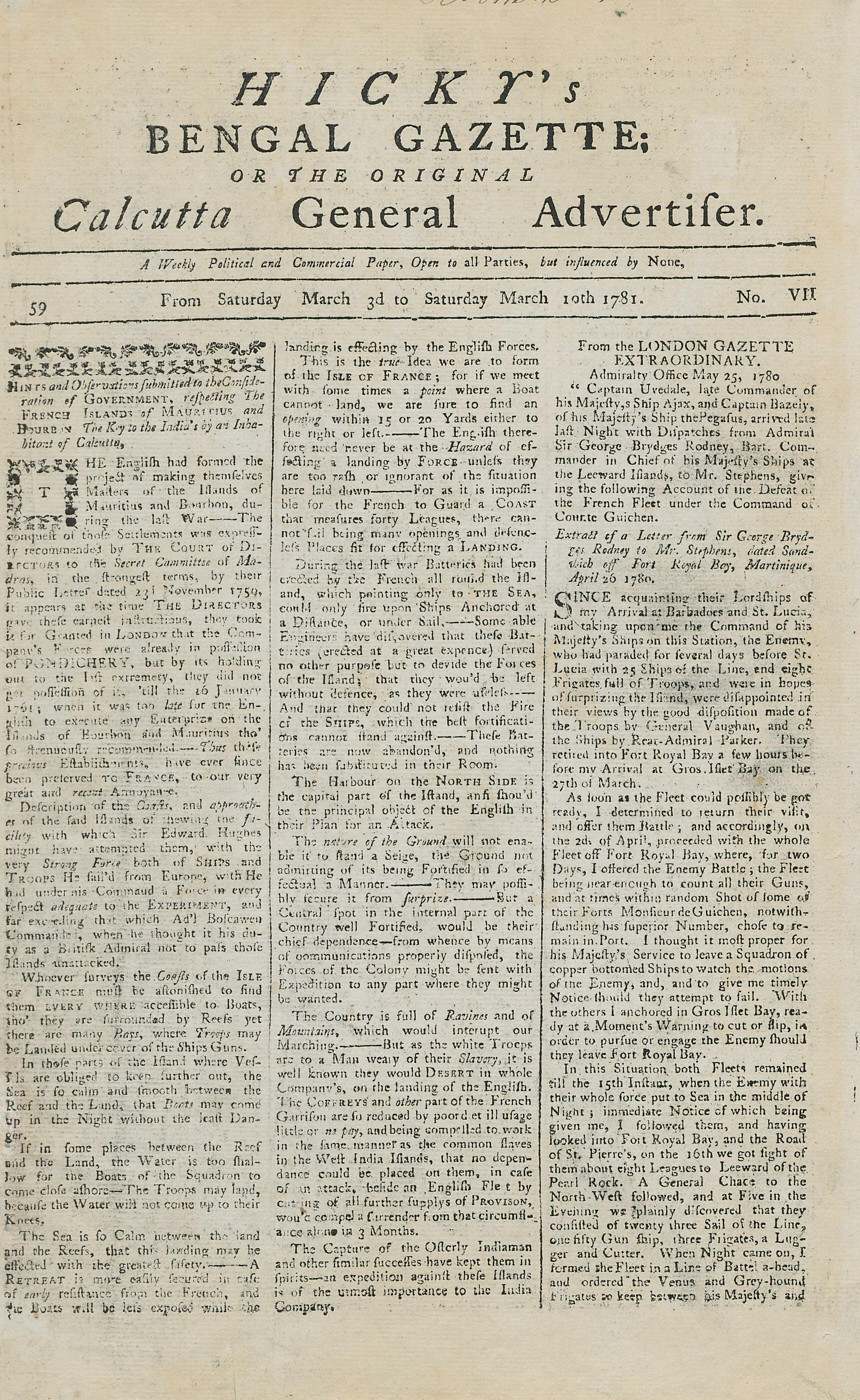
- Front page of Hicky's Bengal Gazette, 10 March 1781, from the University of Heidelberg's archives.
- Type: Weekly newspaper
- Publisher: James Augustus Hicky
- Founded: 29 January 1780
- Ceased publication: 30 March 1782
- Headquarters: 67 Radha Bazar; Kolkata, India
- Country: British India

Hicky's Bengal Gazette or the Original Calcutta General Advertiser was an English-language weekly newspaper published in Kolkata (then Calcutta), the capital of British India. It was the first newspaper printed in Asia, and was published for two years, between 1780 and 1782, before the East India Company seized the newspaper's types and printing press. Founded by James Augustus Hicky, a highly eccentric Irishman who had previously spent two years in jail for debt, the newspaper was strong critical of the administration of Governor General Warren Hastings. The newspaper was important for its provocative journalism and its fight for free expression in India.

== Newspaper history ==
Hicky's Bengal Gazette was first published on 29 January 1780, its founder, James Augustus Hicky, having earlier printed a prospectus announcing that he would begin printing a newspaper. The idea of printing a newspaper in India had been floated twelve years earlier by the Dutch Adventurer William Bolts, but Hicky was the first to execute the concept. Hicky's newspaper was printed once a week on Saturday, and retailed for Rs 1. Its circulation was estimated to be around four hundred copies per week, although possibly more.

Hicky initially avoided political controversy. As he observed the effect his paper had, he became more political and his neutral editorial policy shifted to an independent one. His slogan became "Open to all Parties, but influenced by None". After he learned that competitors with ties to the East India Company were intending to launch a rival newspaper, the India Gazette, he took a strongly anti-Company stance. Hicky accused an East India Company employee, Simeon Droz, of supporting the India Gazette as punishment for Hicky's refusal to pay a bribe to Droz and Marian Hastings, Warren Hastings' wife.

In retaliation for Hicky's accusation, Hastings' Supreme Council forbid Hicky's Bengal Gazette from being mailed through the post office. On 18 November 1780, the same day that the first India Gazette was published, Hicky modified the name of his newspaper from Hicky's Bengal Gazette; or, Calcutta General Advertiser, to Hicky's Bengal Gazette; or the Original Calcutta General Advertiser to emphasize that his newspaper was founded first.

Hicky claimed that the Supreme Council's order violated his right to free expression, and accused Hastings of corruption, tyranny, and prosecuting wars of aggression. Hicky also accused other British leaders in Calcutta of corruption, including the Chief Justice of the Supreme Court of Judicature at Fort William, Elijah Impey of taking bribes, and the leader of the Protestant Mission, Johann Zacharias Kiernander of stealing from an orphaned children's fund. Hicky's editorial independence was short lived as Hastings and Kiernander sued him for libel. After four dramatic trials in June 1781, the Supreme Court found Hicky guilty and sentenced him to jail.

Hicky continued to print his newspaper from jail, and continued to accuse Hastings and others of corruption. He was finally suppressed when Hastings instituted fresh lawsuits against him. Hicky's Bengal Gazette ceased publication on 30 March 1782 when its types were seized by an order of the Supreme Court. The next week, its types and printing press were publicly auctioned and sold to the India Gazette.

== Editorial policy ==
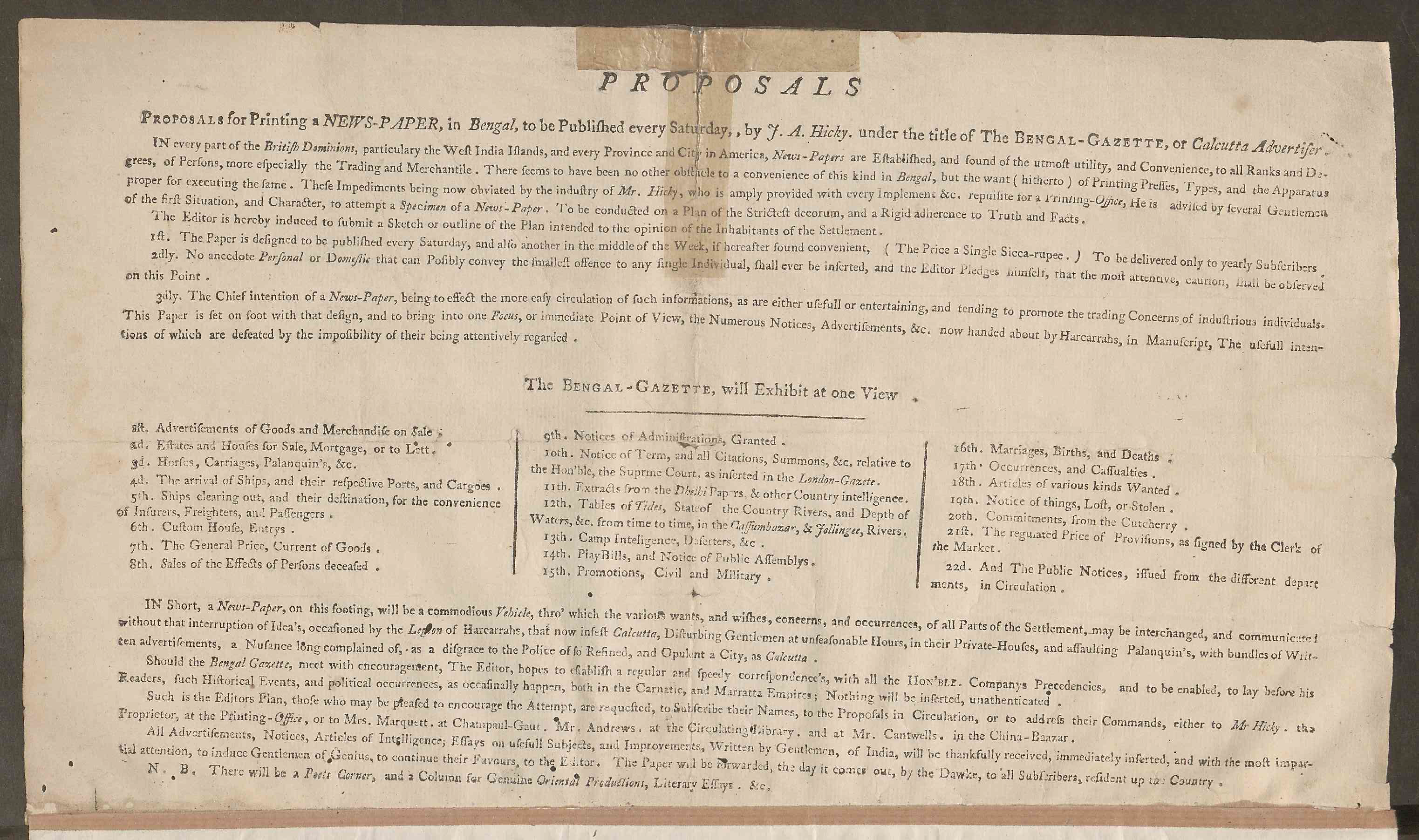
Prospectus of Hicky's Bengal Gazette, printed sometime before the first issue.

Hicky's Bengal Gazette was known for its sarcastic and provocative writing style. Unlike many newspapers of its time, the newspaper discussed taboo topics like female masturbation, and proto-class consciousness, arguing for the rights of the poor and against taxation without representation. It was strongly anti-war and anti-colonial and routinely ridiculed East India Company leadership for their expansionist and imperialist objectives.

== Contemporary views ==
The memoirist William Hickey (who was not related to the paper's founder) describes its establishment shortly after he had succeeded (in his capacity as an attorney-at-law) in having James Hicky released from debtor's jail:

"At the time I first saw Hicky he had been about seven years in India. During his confinement he met with a treatise upon printing, from which he collected sufficient information to commence [as a] printer, there never having been a press in Calcutta ... it occurred to Hicky that great benefit might arise from setting on foot a public newspaper, nothing of that kind ever having appeared. Upon his types &c., therefore reaching him, he issued proposals for printing a weekly paper, which, meeting with extraordinary encouragement, he speedily issued his first work. As a novelty every person read it, and was delighted. Possessing a fund of low wit, his paper abounded with proof of that talent. He had also a happy knack at applying appropriate nicknames and relating satirical anecdotes".

Hicky benefited little from the paper, as William Hickey further tells us that he allowed it "to become the channel of personal invective, and the most scurrilous abuse of individuals of all ranks, high and low, rich and poor, many were attacked in the most wanton and cruel manner ... His utter ruin was the consequence".

== Legacy ==
Hicky's Bengal Gazette was the first printed newspaper to be published in Asia. The newspaper became famous among the British soldiers posted in India at that time.

Hicky's former assistant Paul Ferris later ran a Calcutta printing shop and worked with Ganga Kishore Bhattacharya, founder of the first Indian-produced newspaper, Bengal Gazetti, in 1818. Andrew Otis suggests Ferris showed Bhattacharya Hicky's paper and helped transfer printing knowledge. Names from the full 1780 to 1782 run, drawn mainly from the British Library and University of Heidelberg copies, with gaps filled from the National Library of India and the High Court of Calcutta, have also been transcribed into the Families in British India Society database.

== Surviving collections ==
Six archives are known to have collections (all incomplete) of Hicky's Bengal Gazette:

1. University of Melbourne
2. University of Heidelberg. From George Livius. Available for free online.
3. National Library of India
4. High Court of Calcutta (only an extraordinary issue dated 25 June 1781).
5. British Library. Two collections. One originally from the British Museum, from George Livius. The other, less complete collection, is originally from a private auction and from the India Office Library.
6. University of California, Berkeley's Bancroft Library. Collected by H. Morse Stephens sometime before 1907. This collection was likely once owned by Paul Ferris, one of Hicky's assistants.

YYYY-MM-DD	British Library	University of Heidelberg	National Library of India	University of Melbourne	High Court of Calcutta	University of California, Berkeley	Notes
Prospectus	No	No	No	Yes	No	No	Likely printed in the week or month before the first issue
1780-01-29	No	No	Yes	No	No	Yes	The first issue
1780-02-05	No	No	No	No	No	Yes	
1780-02-12	No	No	No	No	No	Yes	
1780-02-19	No	No	Yes	No	No	Yes	
1780-02-26	No	No	Yes	No	No	Yes	
1780-03-04	No	No	Yes	No	No	Yes	
1780-03-11	No	No	Yes	No	No	Yes	
1780-03-18	No	No	Yes	No	No	Yes	
1780-03-25	No	No	Yes	No	No	Yes	
1780-04-01	No	No	Yes	Yes	No	Yes	
1780-04-08	Yes	No	Yes	No	No	Yes	
1780-04-15	Yes	No	Yes	No	No	Yes	
1780-04-22	No	No	Yes	No	No	Yes	
1780-04-29	Yes	No	Yes	No	No	Yes	
1780-05-06	Yes	No	Yes	Yes	No	Yes	
1780-05-13	Yes	No	Yes	No	No	Yes	
1780-05-20	Yes	No	Yes	No	No	No	
1780-05-27	Yes	No	Yes	No	No	Yes	
1780-06-03	Yes	No	Yes	No	No	Yes	
1780-06-10	Yes	No	Yes	No	No	Yes	
1780-06-17	Yes	No	Yes	No	No	Yes	
1780-06-24	Yes	No	Yes	No	No	Yes	
1780-07-01	Yes	No	Yes	No	No	Yes	
1780-07-08	Yes	No	Yes	No	No	Yes	
1780-07-15	Yes	No	Yes	No	No	Yes	
1780-07-22	Yes	No	Yes	No	No	Yes	
1780-07-29	Yes	No	Yes	No	No	Yes	
1780-08-05	Yes	No	Yes	No	No	Yes	
1780-08-12	Partial	No	Yes	Yes	No	Yes	BL is missing pages 2&3
1780-08-19	Yes	No	Partial	Yes	No	Yes	NLI is missing part of page 1&2
1780-08-26	Yes	No	Yes	Partial	No	Yes	Melbourne is missing page 1&2
1780-09-02	Yes	No	Yes	No	No	Yes	
1780-09-09	Yes	No	Partial	No	No	Yes	
1780-09-16	Yes	No	Yes	No	No	Yes	
1780-09-23	Yes	No	Yes	No	No	Yes	
1780-09-30	Yes	No	Yes	No	No	Yes	
1780-10-07	Yes	No	No	No	No	Yes	
1780-10-14	Yes	No	Yes	No	No	Yes	
1780-10-21	Yes	No	Yes	No	No	Yes	
1780-10-28	Yes	No	Yes	No	No	Yes	
1780-11-04	Yes	No	Partial	No	No	Yes	NLI is missing part of pages 3&4
1780-11-11	Yes	No	Yes	No	No	Yes	
1780-11-18	Yes	No	Yes	No	No	Yes	
1780-11-25	Yes	No	Yes	No	No	Yes	
1780-12-02	Yes	No	Yes	Yes	No	Yes	
1780-12-09	Yes	No	Yes	No	No	Yes	
1780-12-16	Yes	No	Yes	Yes	No	Yes	
1780-12-23	Yes	No	Yes	Yes	No	Yes	
1780-12-30	Yes	No	Yes	No	No	Yes	
1781-01-06	No	No	No	No	No	No	Existence Imputed
1781-01-13	No	No	No	Yes	No	Yes	
1781-01-20	No	No	No	Yes	No	No	
1781-01-27	Yes	No	Yes	Yes	No	Yes	
1781-02-03	Yes	No	Yes	No	No	Yes	
1781-02-10	Yes	No	Yes	Yes	No	Yes	
1781-02-17	Yes	No	Yes	Yes	No	Yes	
1781-02-24	Yes	No	Yes	Yes	No	Yes	
1781-03-03	Yes	No	No	Yes	No	Yes	
1781-03-10	Yes	Yes	Yes	Yes	No	Yes	
1781-03-17	Yes	No	Yes	Yes	No	Yes	
1781-03-24	Yes	No	Yes	Yes	No	Yes	
1781-03-31	Yes	Yes	Yes	Yes	No	Yes	
1781-04-07	Yes	Yes	Yes	Yes	No	Yes	
1781-04-14	Yes	No	Yes	Yes	No	Yes	British Museum edition of the BL missing sections on pages 1&2
1781-04-21	Yes	Yes	Yes	Yes	No	Yes	
1781-04-28	Yes	Yes	Yes	Yes	No	Yes	
1781-04-28 Extraordinary	Yes	No	No	No	No	Yes	
1781-05-05	Yes	Yes	Yes	No	No	Yes	
1781-05-12	Yes	Yes	Yes	Yes	No	Yes	
1781-05-19	Yes	Yes	Partial	Yes	No	Yes	NLI is missing part of pages 1&2
1781-05-26	Yes	Yes	Yes	Yes	No	Yes	
1781-06-02	Yes	Yes	Yes	Yes	No	Yes	
1781-06-09	Partial	Yes	Yes	Yes	No	Yes	BL missing pages 1&2
1781-06-16	Yes	Yes	Yes	Yes	No	Yes	
1781-06-23	No	No	Yes	No	No	Yes	
1781-06-25 Extraordinary	Yes	No	No	No	Yes	No	
1781-06-30	Partial	Partial	Partial	Partial	No	Partial	All collections are missing sections on pages 3& 4
1781-07-07	Yes	Yes	Yes	Yes	No	Yes	
1781-07-07 Supplement	No	Yes	Yes	Yes	No	Yes	Supplement is between pages 3&4
1781-07-14	No	No	Yes	No	No	Yes	
1781-07-21	Yes	Yes	Yes	Yes	No	Yes	
1781-07-23 Extraordinary	Yes	No	No	No	No	Yes	
1781-07-28	Yes	Yes	Yes	No	No	No	Mislabeled as 30 July
1781-08-04	Yes	Yes	Yes	Yes	No	Yes	
1781-08-06 Extraordinary	Yes	Yes	Partial	No	No	Yes	
1781-08-11	Yes	Yes	Yes	Yes	No	Yes	
1781-08-18	Yes	Yes	Yes	Yes	No	Yes	
1781-08-25	Yes	Yes	Yes	Yes	No	Yes	
1781-09-01	Yes	Yes	Yes	Yes	No	Yes	
1781-09-08	Yes	Yes	Yes	Yes	No	Yes	
1781-09-15	Yes	Yes	Yes	No	No	Yes	
1781-09-15 Supplement	Yes	No	Yes	No	No	Yes	Supplement is between pages 3&4
1781-09-22	Yes	Yes	Partial	Yes	No	Yes	
1781-09-29	Yes	Yes	Yes	Yes	No	Yes	
1781-10-06	Yes	Yes	Yes	Yes	No	Yes	
1781-10-13	Yes	Yes	Yes	Yes	No	Yes	
1781-10-20	Yes	Yes	Yes	Yes	No	Yes	
1781-10-27	Yes	Yes	Yes	Yes	No	Yes	
1781-11-03	Yes	Yes	Yes	Yes	No	Yes	
1781-11-10	Yes	Yes	Yes	Yes	No	Yes	
1781-11-17	Yes	Yes	Yes	Yes	No	Yes	
1781-11-24	Yes	No	Yes	Yes	No	Yes	
1781-11-26 Extraordinary	Yes	No	No	No	No	No	
1781-12-01	Yes	Yes	Yes	Yes	No	Yes	
1781-12-08	Yes	Yes	Yes	Yes	No	Yes	British Museum edition of the BL missing section on page 3
1781-12-15	Yes	Yes	Yes	No	No	Yes	
1781-12-22	Yes	Yes	Yes	Yes	No	Yes	
1781-12-29	Yes	Yes	Yes	Yes	No	Yes	
1782-01-05	Yes	Yes	No	No	No	Partial	Berkeley is missing pages 3&4
1782-01-12	Yes	No	No	No	No	No	
1782-01-19	Yes	No	No	No	No	No	
1782-01-26	Yes	No	No	No	No	No	
1782-02-02	Yes	No	No	Yes	No	No	
1782-02-09	Yes	No	No	No	No	No	
1782-02-16	Yes	No	No	No	No	No	
1782-02-23	Yes	No	No	No	No	No	
1782-03-02	Yes	No	No	No	No	No	
1782-03-09	Yes	No	No	No	No	No	
1782-03-16	Yes	No	No	No	No	No	
1782-03-23	Yes	No	No	No	No	No	
1782-03-30	Yes	No	No	No	No	No	The last issue
Total Issues (excluding prospectus, partial issues, supplements, and extraordinaries)	95	37	88	51	0	96	
Total Issues (including prospectus, partial issues, supplements, and extraordinaries)	104	40	97	55	1	103	

== Gallery ==
Images of Hicky's Bengal Gazette
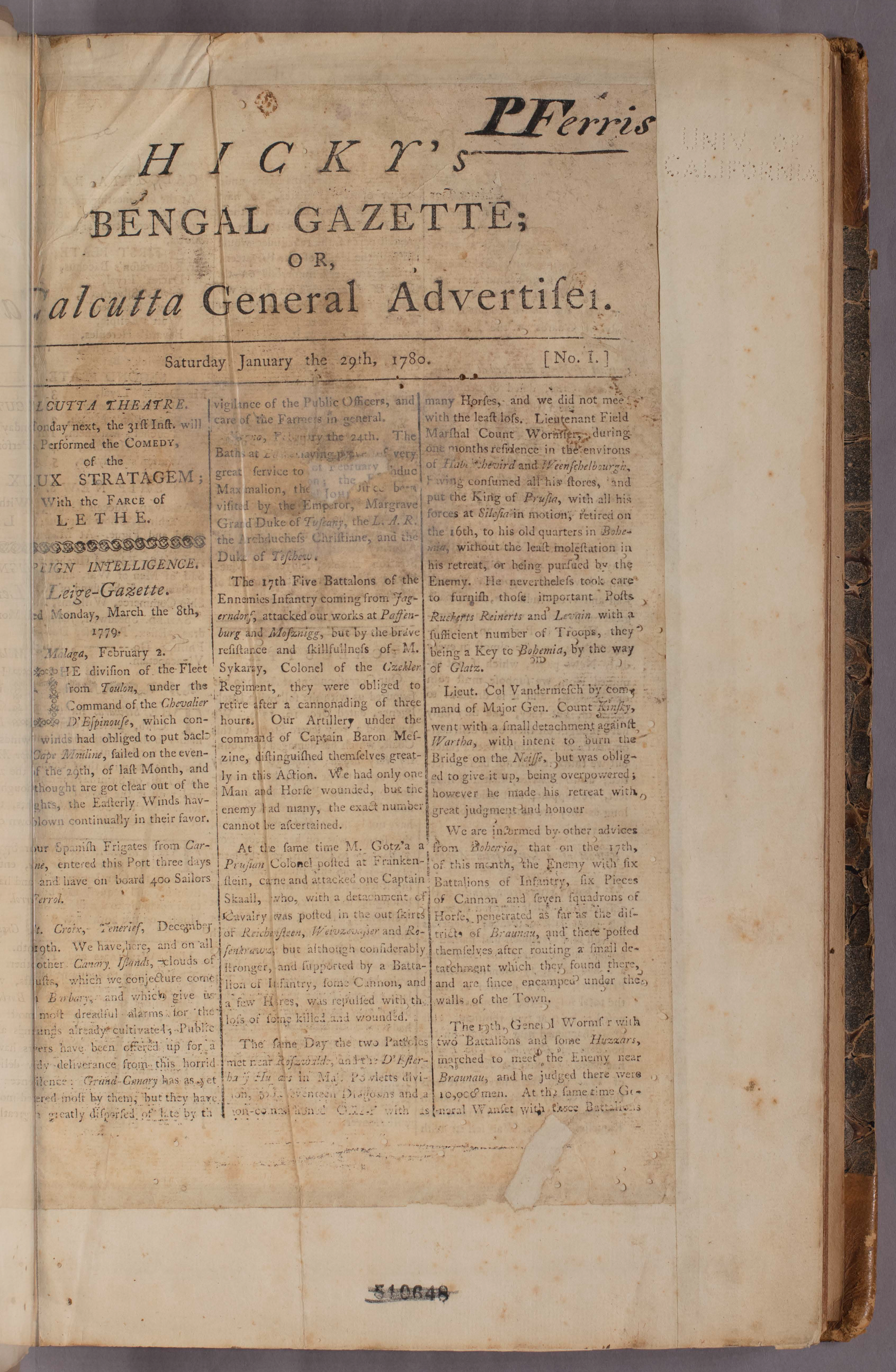
The first page of the first issue of Hicky's Bengal Gazette in a bound volume at the University of California, Berkeley's Bancroft Library

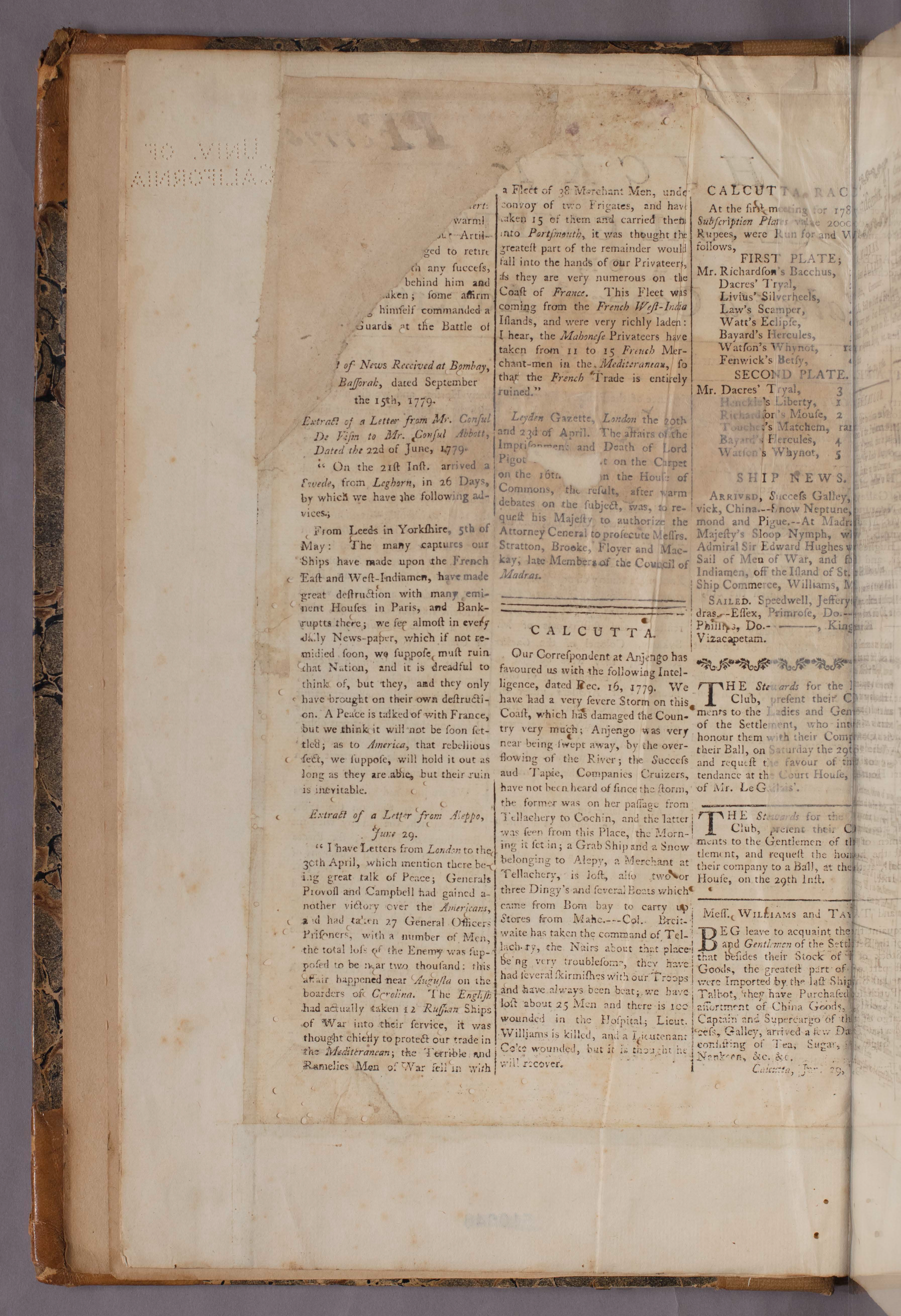
The second page of the first issue of Hicky's Bengal Gazette

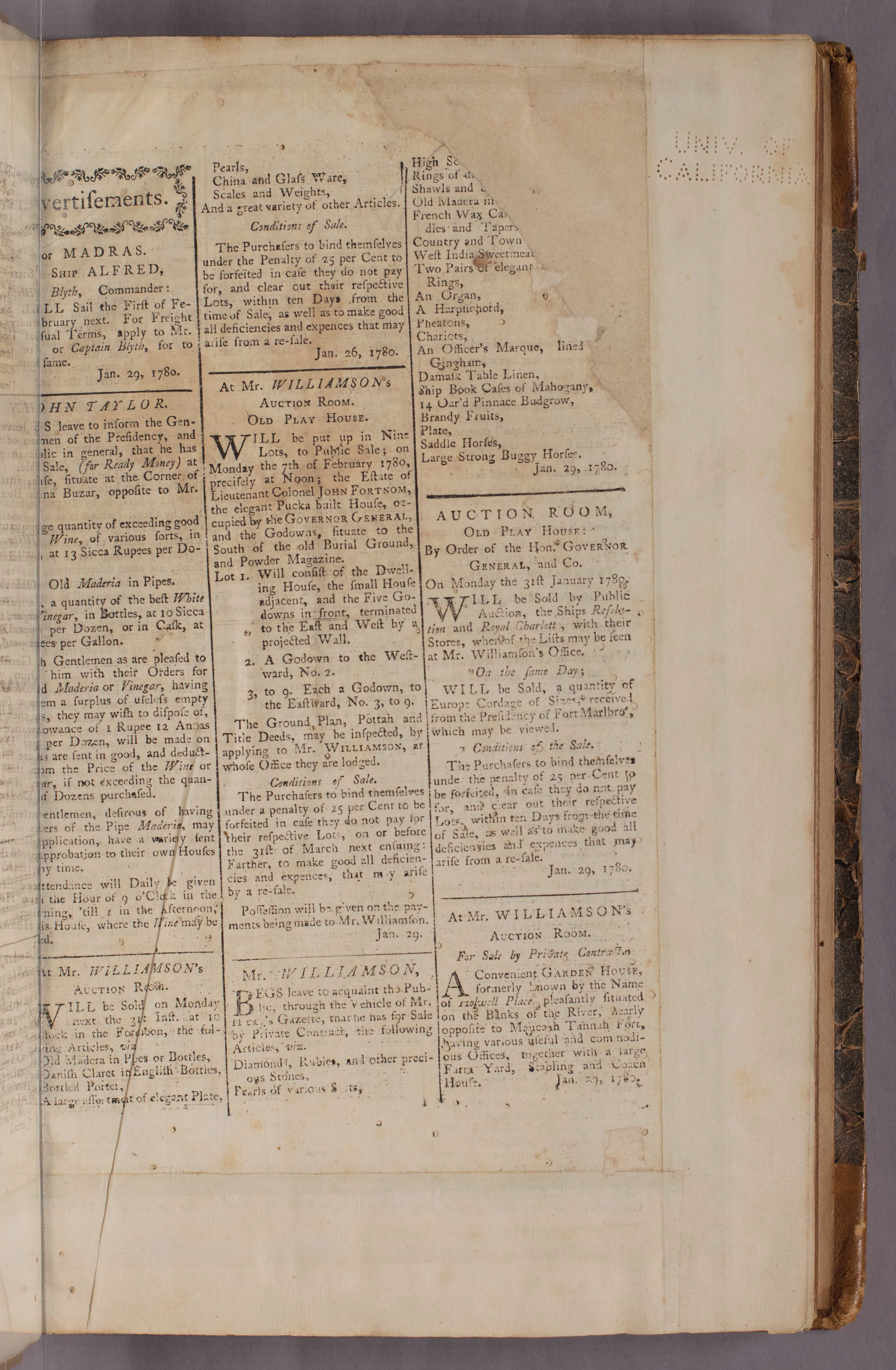
The third page of the first issue of Hicky's Bengal Gazette

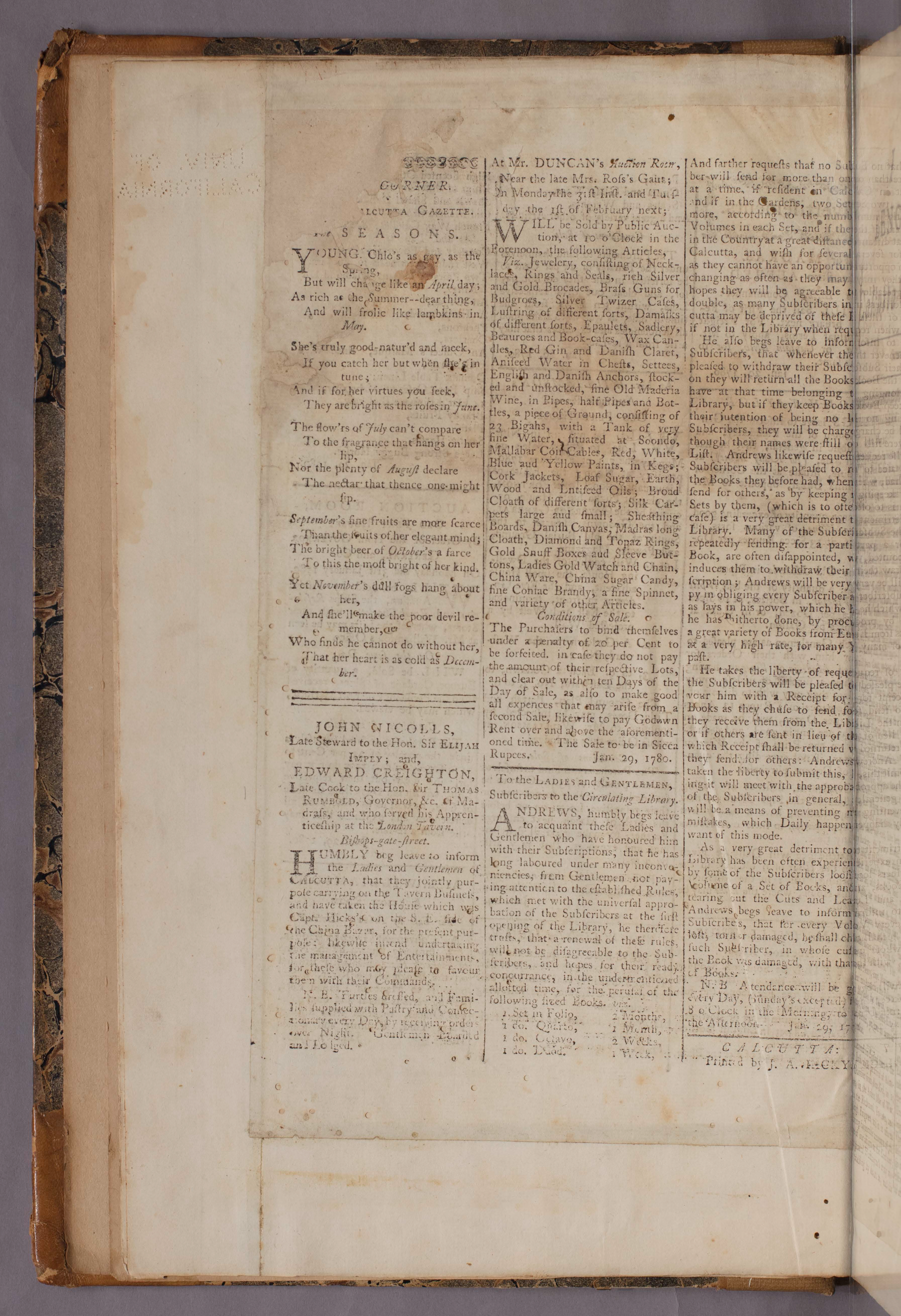
The fourth page of the first issue of Hicky's Bengal Gazette

== Bibliography ==
- Otis, Andrew (2018). Hicky's Bengal Gazette: The Untold Story of India's First Newspaper. Westland Books. ISBN 978-93-86850-91-1.
