= Marathi grammar =

Grammar of the Marathi language, an Indo-Aryan language spoken in Maharashtra, India

The grammar of the Marathi language shares similarities with other modern Indo-Aryan languages such as Odia, Gujarati or Punjabi. The first modern book exclusively about the grammar of Marathi was published and printed in 1805 by Willam Carey.

The principal word order in Marathi is SOV (subject–object–verb). Nouns inflect for gender (masculine, feminine, neuter), number (singular, plural), and case. Marathi preserves the neuter gender found in Sanskrit, a feature further distinguishing it from many Indo-Aryan languages. Typically, Marathi adjectives do not inflect unless they end in an आ (/aː/) vowel, in which case they inflect for gender and number. Marathi verbs inflect for tense (past, present, future). Verbs can agree with their subjects, yielding an active voice construction, or with their objects, yielding a passive voice construction. A third type of voice, not found in English for example, is produced when the verb agrees with neither subject nor object. Affixation is largely suffixal in the language and postpositions are attested. An unusual feature of Marathi, as compared to other Indo-European languages, is that it displays the inclusive and exclusive we feature, that is common to the Dravidian languages, Rajasthani, and Gujarati.

The contemporary grammatical rules described by Maharashtra Sahitya Parishad and endorsed by the Government of Maharashtra are supposed to take precedence in standard written Marathi. These rules are described in Marathi Grammar, written by M. R. Walambe. The book is widely referred to students in schools and colleges.

== Sanskrit influence ==
Traditions of Marathi linguistics and above mentioned rules give special status to ‘tatsama’ (तत्सम) words borrowed from the Sanskrit language. This special status expects the rules for ‘tatsama’ words be followed as of Sanskrit grammar.

== Parts of speech ==
Marathi words can be classified in any of the following parts of speech:

English	Sanskrit
Noun	nāma (नाम)
Pronoun	sarvanāma (सर्वनाम)
Adjective	vishheshaṇa (विशेषण)
Verb	kriyāpada (क्रियापद)
Adverb	kriyāvishheshaṇa (क्रियाविशेषण)
Conjunction	ubhayanvayī avyaya (उभयान्वयी अव्यय)
Preposition	shabdayogī avyaya (शब्दयोगी अव्यय)
Interjection	kevalaprayogī avyaya (केवलप्रयोगी अव्यय)

== Nominals ==
Nouns are primarily divided into three categories – proper nouns (विशेषनाम, visheshnāma), common nouns (सामान्यनाम, samānyanāma), and abstract nouns (भाववाचकनाम, bhāvvāchaknāma) – that are identical in definition to their counterparts in other languages (such as English), and are inflected for gender, number and case. They are also often categorized based on their ending vowel, which is especially useful in studying their inflection – those ending in the schwa (or inherent vowel) a (अ) are termed akārānta (अकारान्त), those ending in the vowel ā (आ) are termed ākārānta (आकारान्त), those ending in the vowel ī (ई) are termed īkārānta (ईकारान्त), and so on.

=== Gender ===
There are three genders in Marathi: masculine, feminine, and neuter. Some other modern Indo-European languages have lost these genders, completely, as in English and Persian, or in part, with either neuter and common gender (merging masculine and feminine), as in some North Germanic languages, or feminine and masculine (absorbing neuter), as in almost all Romance languages.

While there exist no concrete rules for determining the gender of a given noun, certain observations do help speakers in that regard: masculine nouns can only be akārānta or ākārānta, while neuter nouns can only be akārānta, īkārānta, ukārānta (उकारान्त, ending in u), or ekārānt (एकारान्त, ending in e).

The grammatical gender of common nouns referring to animated objects corresponds to their natural sex – for example, mulagā (मुलगा, 'boy') is a masculine noun, whereas mulagī (मुलगी, 'girl') is a feminine one. Given the masculine forms of such nouns, the feminine noun can often be determined using a set of rules:

- Some ākārānta nouns have corresponding feminine forms as īkārānta with the same root – mulagā/mulagī (boy/girl), kutrā/kutrī (dog/bitch), ghoḍā/ghoḍī (horse/mare).
- Some akārānta nouns also have their corresponding feminine forms as īkārānta with the same root – hansa/hansī (male and female swans), vānar/vānrī (male and female monkeys).
- Some nouns use the suffix - īṇa (ईण) to form their feminine forms – vāgha/vāghīṇa (tiger/tigress), mālaka/mālakīṇa (male and female owners).
- Some nouns have their feminine forms made out of entirely different words – navarā/bāīko (husband/wife), bāp/āī (father/mother), rājā/rāṇī (king/queen).

=== Case ===
There are differences of opinion regarding grammatical cases in Marathi. According to one view, there are two cases: direct, which is unmarked (e.g. rām 'Ram (name)' and oblique, which is used before adpositions (e.g. rām-ā-lā 'to Ram', -ā being the oblique case marker and -lā the dative adposition) and postpositions (e.g. rām-ā-pāsuni 'from Ram',-ā being the oblique case marker and -pāsun the postposition). The form of the oblique suffix depends on the gender and the final vowel of the word it is suffixed to.

According to this analysis, true postpositions (like -pāsunī 'from') have a wide range of meanings and can be separated form the noun by clitics like -cya (e.g. ram-a-cya-pasuni). Adpositions (like -la), on the other hand, are only used to mark nominal arguments of the verb in terms of their theta roles and cannot be separated from the noun by clitics (*ram-a-cya-la is ungrammatical). Syntactically, the latter behave the same as case markers corresponding to the traditional grammar. In this view, the cases are: nominative (unmarked), accusative (singular -la, plural -na), ergative, which is traditionally called 'instrumental' (sg. -ne, pl. -nni), dative (singular -sa/si, plural "-nvsa/nvsi"), and genitive/possessive (-tsa, -tse, -tʃa, -tʃi).

The class of true postpositions will then include -hatun 'through', -hu(n) 'from'/ablative, -t locative, -jagi 'in place of' and many more. The genitive markers inflect to agree with the governing noun.

==== Traditional grammar ====
Declension of मी (mī)
	singular	plural
nominative(प्रथमा)	मी (mī)	आम्ही (āmhī)
accusative and Dative(द्वितीया आणि चतुर्थी)	मला,मज,माझ्यास (malā), (maja), (māzhyāsa)	आम्हाला,आम्हांस (āmhālā),(āmhāmsa)
Instrumental(तृतीया)	माझ्याने, माझ्याशी (mājhyāne), (mājhāshī)	आमच्याने, आमच्याशी (āmachyāne), (āmachyāshī)
Ablative(पञ्चमी)	माझ्याहून, माझ्यापासून (mājhyaāhūn'a),(mājhyāpāsūn'a)	आम्हांहून,आम्हांपासून (āmhāmhūn'a),(āmhāmpāsūn'a)
Genetive(षष्ठी)	माझा(māzā) (singular male),माझे(māze) (singular neutral and plural male),माझी(mājhi) (singular female and plural neutral),माझ्या(mājhyā) (female plural and oblique)	आमचा(āmatsā) (singular male),आमचे(āmatse) (singular neutral and plural male),आमची (āmachi) (singular female and plural neutral),आमच्या (āmachyā)(female plural and oblique)
Locative(सप्तमी)	माझ्यात (mājhyāt'a)	आम्हांत (āmhāmta)

In traditional analyses which follow the pattern of Sanskrit grammatical tradition, case suffixes are referred to as (vibhaktī pratyaya) विभक्ति प्रत्यय. There are eight such (vibhaktī) विभक्ती (विभक्ती) in Marathi. The form of the original word changes when such a suffix is to be attached to the word, and the new, modified root is referred to as saamaanya ruup of the original word. For example, the word (ghodā) घोडा (“horse”) gets transformed into (ghodyā-) घोड्या- when the suffix (-vara) वर- (“on”) is attached to it to form (ghodyāvara) घोड्यावर (“on the horse”). The nominal suffixes are tabulated below.

Sanskrit Ordinal Number	English Ordinal Number	Sanskrit Case Description	English Case Description	Singular Suffixes (एकवचन)	Plural Suffixes (अनेकवचन)	Notes
prathamā (प्रथमा)	First	kartā (कर्ता)	Nominative case	-	–	The nominative case uses the unmarked singular or plural form. The unmarked form may also mark certain direct objects. (Note: In the case of indefinite and inanimate direct objects, Marathi exhibits Differential object marking (see below) and uses the unmarked form rather than the form with the accusative ending. Despite being used for a direct object, such unmarked nouns are still considered to be प्रथमा/कर्ता in the traditional analysis and it common to still use the word "nominative" to refer to them.)
dvitīyā (द्वितीया)	Second	karma (कर्म)	Accusative case	-lā,sa (ला,स) (Note: Suffixes like -स and -त are pronounced -s and -t, due to the oblique form always ending in a non-schwa vowel, resulting in a mandatory schwa deletion)	Nnā,msa(न्ना,ंस)-	-sa and -te are not typically used. (Note: -s, while more prevalent in Old Marathi, is largely restricted to the formal written register, and typically used when talking about people.) (Note: -te is obsolete in Modern Marathi but can be found in old poetry, and was the primary marker in Old Marathi) Direct objects may also be unmarked in some situations.
trutīyā (तृतीया)	Third	karaṇa (करण)	Instrumental case (and Ergative case)	Nē ने	-nnī (न्नी)	-shī is not typically used as an instrumental, and never for the ergative case. (Note: -ṣī is only used as an instrumental suffix in northeastern varieties of Marathi but is recognized as such by other speakers. Most speakers use this suffix as a variant of the adessive postposition पाशी pāṣi)
caturthī (चतुर्थी)	Fourth	sampradāna (सम्प्रदान)	Dative case	-lā,sa (ला,स),	-nnā,nvsa (न्ना,ंस),	
pancamī (पञ्चमी)	Fifth	apādāna (अपादान)	Ablative case	-ūna (ऊन), (Note: Vowel suffixes like -i and -un attach the vowel directly to the ending consonant, and are applied to the unmarked (direct) singular form of the noun, as opposed to the oblique form. For example, सकाळ sakāḷa (morning) has a locative case of सकाळी sakāḷī, and घर ghara (house) has an ablative case of घरून gharūna) -hūna (हून)	-ūna (ऊन), -nvhūna (हून)	-hūna is used when the noun ends in a vowel.
shhashhthī (षष्ठी)	Sixth	sambandha (सम्बन्ध)	Genitive case	-cā (-चा), -cī (-ची), -ce (-चे)	-ce (-चे), -cyā (-च्या), -cī (-ची)	The specific suffix used depends on the gender of the noun.
saptamī (सप्तमी)	Seventh	adhikarana (अधिकरण)	Locative case	-ta (-त), -i (-इ), -ā (-आ)	-nta (-न्त), -ī (-ई), -ā (-आ)	The specific suffix used depends on the morphology of the noun and the connotation desired. (Note: The -ī suffix must be used for some feminine stems that end in a consonant (e.g. सकाळी sakāḷī), and may be used for some masculine and neuter stems that end in a consonant (e.g. हातात/हाती hātāta/hātī and घरात/घरी gharāta/gharī). When ambiguous, the -ta suffix has a connotation of location inside a well-defined area in space or time, whereas -ī has a connotation of location "at" a less well defined space, time, or concept. As a rough analogy, the difference between gharāt and gharī, both locative cases of ghara (house), is similar to the difference between "in (a) house" and "at (a) home".)
		sambhodana (सम्बोधन)	Vocative case	आ	-nno (-न्नो)	The vocative case cannot be used in the singular

Examples
English Case Description	Singular (एकवचन)	Case Ending Used	Plural (अनेकवचन)	Case Ending Used
Nominative case	–	–	विद्यार्थी अभ्यास करतात	–
Accusative case	घराला रंग दिला	-lā (-ला)	घरांना रंग दिला	-ṁnā (ंना)
Instrumental case	विद्यार्थी लेखणीने चित्र काढतो	-ne (ने)	विद्यार्थी लेखण्यांनी चित्र काढतात	-ṁnī (ंनी)
Instrumental case	मुलगा दाराशी उभा होता	-shī (शी)	मुले दारांशी उभी होती	-ṁshī (ंशी)
Dative case	मी विद्यार्थ्यास ओळखतो	-sa (-स)	मी विद्यार्थ्यांस ओळखतो	-ṁsa (ंस)
Dative case	मी मुलाला ओळखतो	-lā (-ला)	मी मुलांना ओळखतो	-ṁnā (ंना)
Ablative case	मुलगा घरून निघाला	-ūna (-ऊन)	मुले घरून निघाली	-ūna (-ऊन)
Ablative case	मुलगा गावाहून आला	-hūna (हून)	मुले गावाहून आली	-hūna (हून)
Genitive case	घराचा दर्वाजा सुन्दर आहे	-cā (-चा) (masc.)	घरांचे दरवाजे सुंदर आहेत	-ce (-चे) (masc.)
Genitive case	मुलांची तब्येत सुधारली आहे	-cī (-ची) (fem.)	मुलांच्या तब्येती सुधारल्या आहेत	-cyā (-च्या) (fem.)
Genitive case	मुलाचे प्रगती पत्रक मिळाले	-ce (-चे) (neu.)	मुलांची प्रगती पत्रके मिळाली	-cī (-ची) (neu.)
Locative case	मुलगा घरात होता	-ta (-त)	मुले घरांत होती	-ṁta (-ंत)
Locative case	मुलगा घरी होता	-ī (-ई)	मुले घरी होती	-ī (-ई)
Vocative case	–	–	मुलांनो शांत बसा	-ṁno (-ंनो)

===== Split Ergativity =====
Marathi is considered a split ergative language, i.e. it uses both nominative-accusative and ergative-absolutive alignment. In the latter type, the subject of a transitive verb takes the ergative marking (identical to that of the instrumental case) instead of having the same form as the subject of an intransitive verb. This change also results in the verb agreeing with the unmarked noun (usually the object) instead of its subject, as it would in nominative-accusative situations:

मुलगा पुरी खातो
boy.MASC.SG puri.FEM.SG eat-MASC.SG.PRS
mulgā purī khā-to
"The boy eats puri"

मुलाने पुरी खाल्ली
boy.MASC.SG-ERG puri.FEM.SG eat-FEM.SG.PST
mulā-ne purī khā-llī
"The boy ate puri"

Note that it is possible for the unmarked noun to be a direct object despite Marathi having an accusative case: Marathi exhibits differential object marking for direct objects, and the accusative declension is used in the case of definite or animate objects.

In case there is no unmarked noun, the verb shows neutral agreement:

मुलाने चमच्याने खाल्ले
boy.MASC.SG-ERG spoon.MASC.SG-INST eat-NEUT.SG.PST
mulā-ne camacyā-ne khā-lle
"The boy ate with a spoon"

As in many Indo-Aryan languages, the ergative split in Marathi is primarily aspect-based, specifically triggered by the perfective for transitive verbs, as seen in the examples above. Furthermore, subjects of intransitive verbs in the obligative subjunctive mood are also marked as ergative, as are third-person subjects in the optative:

मुलाने पुरी खाल्ली पाहिजे
boy.MASC.SG-ERG puri.FEM.SG eat-FEM.SG.PFV should.3SG
mulā-ne purī khā-llī pāhije
"The boy must (is obliged to) eat puri"

मुलाने पुरी खावी
boy.MASC.SG-ERG puri.FEM.SG eat-FEM.SG.OPT
mulā-ne purī khā-vī
"(I suggest that) The boy should eat puri"

===== Differential object marking =====
Marathi, like many Indo-Aryan languages, exhibits differential object marking. Direct objects are marked according to definiteness, with unmarked objects representing indefinite nouns. As such, accusative case markings are not universally required.

मुलगा दगड {फेकत आहे}
boy rock throw.PRS.CONT
mulagā dagaḍa {fekata āhe}
"The boy is throwing (some) rocks"

मुलगा दगडाला {फेकत आहे}
boy rock.ACC throw.PRS.CONT
mulagā dagaḍālā {fekata āhe}
"The boy is throwing (the) rock"

Sentences with both unmarked direct objects and unmarked subjects must follow the unmarked SOV word order. Since the nominative case is typically unmarked, the only time this does not occur is when the subject is a pronoun or in the ergative case, allowing for the usage of marked word orders for emphasis:

दगड तो {फेकत आहे}
rock he throw.PRS.CONT
dagaḍa to {fekat āhe}
"He is throwing (some) rocks"

An alternate analysis of this situation is that Marathi does not mark the accusative case at all, rather the -ला marker is shared between the dative case and definite differential object marking.

== Adjectives ==
Adjectives typically precede the noun (although in adjective phrases they can follow the noun) and are divided into declinable and indeclinable categories. Declinable adjectives end in the vowel -ā (आ) and must be declined for the gender, number and case of the nouns they qualify. Declining adjectives for case is easier compared to declining nouns, since a single ending applies to all cases; a complete table listing the different endings is given below, with the masculine nominative singular as the citation form.

			Nominative	All else	Notes
Declinable	Masculine	Singular	-ā (आ)	-yā (या)	The -yā (या) ending requires the removal of the schwa from the final consonant. In other words, the adjective is transformed to its saamaanya ruup.
Declinable	Masculine	Plural	-e (ए)	-yā (या)	The -yā (या) ending requires the removal of the schwa from the final consonant. In other words, the adjective is transformed to its saamaanya ruup.
Declinable	Feminine	Singular	-ī (-ई)	-yā (या)	The -yā (या) ending requires the removal of the schwa from the final consonant. In other words, the adjective is transformed to its saamaanya ruup.
Declinable	Feminine	Plural	-yā (या)	-yā (या)	The -yā (या) ending requires the removal of the schwa from the final consonant. In other words, the adjective is transformed to its saamaanya ruup.
Declinable	Neuter	Singular	-e (ए)	-yā (या)	The -yā (या) ending requires the removal of the schwa from the final consonant. In other words, the adjective is transformed to its saamaanya ruup.
Declinable	Neuter	Plural	-ī (-ई)	-yā (या)	The -yā (या) ending requires the removal of the schwa from the final consonant. In other words, the adjective is transformed to its saamaanya ruup.
Indeclinable	–				

=== Possessive ===
Possessive adjectives in Marathi are slight modifications to the personal pronouns, suffixed with the genitive/possessive case markers – चा/ची/चे (cā/cī/ce), for masculine, feminine and plural subjects respectively. However, in the first and second-person singular the case marking is different, as shown below. Possessive adjectives agree in gender and number with the noun they modify; for plural nouns, the markers change from चा/ची/चे to चे/च्या/ची (ce/cyā/cī), with a similar transformation for the first and second-person singular adjectives.

		Singular		Plural	
		Singular noun	Plural noun	Singular noun	Plural noun
1st person		माझा / माझी / माझे mājhā / mājhī / mājhe	माझे / माझ्या / माझी mājhe / mājhyā / mājhī	आमचा / आमची / आमचे āmachā / āmachī / āmache	आमचे / आमच्या / आमची āmache / āmachyā / āmachī
2nd person		तुझा / तुझी / तुझे tujhā / tujhī / tujhe	तुझे / तुझ्या / तुझी tujhe / tujhyā / tujhī	तुमचा / तुमची / तुमचे tumachā / tumachī / tumache	तुमचे / तुमच्या / तुमची tumache / tumachyā / tumachī
3rd person	M	त्याचा / त्याची / त्याचे tyāchā / tyāchī / tyāche	त्याचे / त्याच्या / त्याची tyāche / tyāchyā / tyāchī	त्यांचा / त्यांची / त्यांचे tyānchā / tyānchī / tyānche	त्यांचे / त्यांच्या / त्यांची tyānche / tyānchyā / tyānchī
3rd person	F	तिचा / तिची / तिचे tichā / tichī / tiche	तिचे / तिच्या / तिची tiche / tichyā / tichī	त्यांचा / त्यांची / त्यांचे tyānchā / tyānchī / tyānche	त्यांचे / त्यांच्या / त्यांची tyānche / tyānchyā / tyānchī
3rd person	N	त्याचा / त्याची / त्याचे tyāchā / tyāchī / tyāche	त्याचे / त्याच्या / त्याची tyāche / tyāchyā / tyāchī	त्यांचा / त्यांची / त्यांचे tyānchā / tyānchī / tyānche	त्यांचे / त्यांच्या / त्यांची tyānche / tyānchyā / tyānchī

=== Demonstrative ===
The adjectives हा (hā, this) and तो (to, that) serve as demonstrative adjectives and are always declined for the gender and number of the noun(s) that follows them.

Adjective	Singular (M/F/N)	Plural (M/F/N)
this/these	हा / ही / हे hā / hī / he	हे / ह्या / ही he / hyā / hī
that/those	तो / ती / ते to / tī / te	ते / त्या / ती te / tyā / tī

== Pronouns ==
There are three grammatical persons (पुरुष purusha) in Marathi. There is gender distinction in the first- and second-persons when the pronouns act as agreement markers on verbs; as independent pronouns this distinction in lost.

English	Sanskrit	Singular	Plural
First Person	प्रथम पुरुष	(mi) मी “I”	(āmhī) आम्ही “we” (exclusive) (āpaṇa) आपण “we” (inclusive)
Second Person	द्वितीय पुरुष	(tū) तू “you”	(tumhī) तुम्ही “you” (formal) (āpaṇa) आपण “you” (extremely formal)
Third Person	तृतीय पुरुष	(to) तो “he” (tī) ती “she” (te) ते “it”	(te) ते “they” (masculine) or (“he”) हे (formal) (tyā) त्या “they” (feminine) (tī) ती “they” (neuter)

== Verbs ==
Verb stems can end in a vowel (ākārānt, īkārānt, or ekārānt) or a consonant (akārānt) and are declined for person, gender and number. They are usually listed in dictionaries in their infinitive forms, which consist of the verb stem with the suffix – ṇe (णे); for example खाणे (khāṇē, to eat), बोलणे (bolaṇē, to speak), चालणे (cālaṇē, to walk). Verbs are fairly regular, although the copula and other auxiliaries are notable exceptions.

The verbal system, much like in other Indo-Aryan languages, revolves around a combination of aspect and tense – there are 3 main aspects (perfect, imperfect, and habitual) and 3 main tenses (present, past, and future). Tenses are marked using conjugations, while aspects are marked using suffixes and by adding conjugations of a copula/auxiliary verb.

=== Copula ===
The verb असणे (asaṇē, to be) is an irregular verb that acts as the copula / auxiliary for all tenses and for the perfect and imperfect aspects; its conjugations are shown below.

असणे (asaṇē, to be)
	Present tense		Past tense		Future tense	
	Singular	Plural	Singular	Plural	Singular	Plural
1st person	आहे āhe	आहोत āhota	होतो/होते hoto/hote	होतो hoto	असेन asena	असू asū
2nd person	आहेस āhes	आहात āhāta	होतास / होतीस hotās / hotīs	होता(त) hotā(ta)	असशील asshīla	असाल asāla
3rd person	आहे āhe	आहेत āheta	होता / होती / होते hotā / hotī / hote	होते hote	असेल asela	असतील astīla

The habitual aspect uses a different set of conjugations of the same auxiliary verb (असणे); for present-tense and past-tense these conjugations are shown below. In future tense a different auxiliary verb, जाणे (jāṇē, to go), is typically used.

असणे (asaṇē, to be, habitual aspect)
	Present tense		Past tense	
	Singular	Plural	Singular	Plural
1st person	असतो / असते asato / asate	असतो asato	असायचो / असायचे asāyaco / asāyace	असायचो asāyaco
2nd person	असतोस / असतेस astosa / astesa	असता asatā	असायचास / असायचीस asāycāsa / asāycisa	असायचात asāycā(ta)
3rd person	असतो / असते / असतं asato / asate / asata	असतात asatāta	असायचा / असायची / असायचं asāyacā / asāyaci / asāyaca	असायचे / असायच्या / असायची asāyace / asāyacyā / asāyaci

=== Causatives ===
Causatives are created from existing verb stems and typically follow the set of patterns listed below.

- Attaching 'व' (va) to the stem of the verb; in modern literature 'व' is often replaced by 'वि' (vi). So हसणे (hasaṇē, to laugh) → हसवणे/हसविणे (hasavaṇē/hasaviṇē, to cause to laugh); चालणे (cālaṇē, to walk) → चालवणे/चालविणे (cālavaṇē/cālaviṇē, to cause to walk).
  - For verbs with stems that have single syllables (खा, घे, दे; khā, ghē, dē), attach 'ववि' (vavi) instead of 'व'. Thus, खाणे (khāṇē, to eat) → खावविणे (khāvaviṇē, to cause to eat); देणे (dēṇē, to give) → देवविणे (dēvaviṇē, to cause to give).
- Root vowel change: a → ā (अ → आ), u/ū → o (उ/ऊ → ओ), i/ī → e (इ/ई → ए); sometimes also accompanied by the root final consonant change 'ṭ' → 'ṛ' (ट → ड). So तुटणे (tuṭaṇē, to be broken) → तोडणे (toṛaṇē, to cause to broken/to break); गळणे (gaḷaṇē, to be buried) → गाळणे (gāḷaṇē, to cause to be buried/to bury).

=== Imperatives ===
The imperative form of a verb (called आज्ञार्थ, ādñārtha) is formed by applying a simple set of rules to the stem of the verb, and has second-person singular (where there is a distinction between formal and informal) and second-person plural forms (which are the same as the second-person singular formal).

- For akārānta verbs, the informal imperative form is the verb stem itself. The formal imperative is formed by utilizing the transformation a → ā (अ → आ) to the stem vowel.
- For ākārānt verbs, the imperative form (formal and informal) is the verb stem itself.
- For īkārānt and ekārānt verbs, the informal imperative is the verb stem itself. The formal imperative is formed by transforming the final vowel to the semi-vowel या (yā).
- Negative imperative forms are constructed by adding the suffix -ऊ (ū) to the verb stem, and then by adding a separate negative particle नकोस/नको (nakosa/nako, for informal imperative) or नका (nakā, for formal imperative).

Imperative forms
Verb (infinitive)		Second-person singular (informal)	Second-person singular (formal) / Second-person plural
बोलणे bolaṇē to speak	–	तू बोल tū bola	तुम्ही बोला tumhī bolā
बोलणे bolaṇē to speak	Negative	तू बोलू नकोस / नको tu bolū nakosa / nako	तुम्ही बोलू नका tumhī bolū nakā
खाणे khāṇē to eat	–	तू खा tū khā	तुम्ही खा tumhī khā
खाणे khāṇē to eat	Negative	तू खाऊ नकोस / नको tū khāū nakosa / nako	तुम्ही खाऊ नका tumhī khaū nakā
देणे dēṇē to give		तू दे tū de	तुम्ही द्या tumhī dyā
देणे dēṇē to give	Negative	तू देऊ नकोस / नको tū deū nakosa / nako	तुम्ही देऊ नका tumhī deū nakā

=== Voice ===
Traditional grammar distinguishes three grammatical voices (प्रयोग, prayoga) in Marathi.

- Active voice (कर्तरी प्रयोग kartarī prayoga) refers to a sentence construction in which the verb changes according to the subject

राम म्हणतोय
Rāma mhaṇtoya
“Rām says”

राम आंबा खातोय
Rāma āmbā khātoya
“Rām eats a mango”

- Passive voice (कर्मणी प्रयोग karmanī prayoga) refers to a sentence construction in which the verb changes according to the object

रामाने आंबा खाल्ला
Rāmānē āmbā khāllā
“The mango was eaten by Raam”

रामाने सांगितले
Rāmānē sāngitale
“It was told by Rām”

- Bhāve prayoga (भावे प्रयोग) refers to a sentence construction in which the verb does not change according to either the subject or the object. This is used for imperatives.

माझा निरोप त्याला जाऊन सांग
Mājha nirop tyālā jāun sāng
“Go tell him my message”

== Sentence structure ==
A Marathi sentence generally has three parts: subject (कर्ता kartā), object (कर्म karma), and verb (क्रियापद kriyāpada). While there is no real restriction on word order, SOV is most commonly used. Poetry like Powada often play with the word order for emphasis or to fit the meter or rhyme.

See also:

- Marathi language

== Bibliography ==
- Dhongde, Ramesh Vaman; Wali, Kashi (2009). Marathi. Amsterdam: John Benjamins Pub. Co. ISBN 978-90-272-38139.
