= Pury End =

Hamlet in Northamptonshire, England

Coordinates: 52.1036°N 0.9660°W

- Location within Northamptonshire
- OS grid reference: SP709455
- Unitary authority: West Northamptonshire
- Ceremonial county: Northamptonshire
- Region: East Midlands
- Country: England
- Sovereign state: United Kingdom
- Post town: Towcester
- Postcode district: NN12
- Dialling code: 01327
- Police: Northamptonshire
- Fire: Northamptonshire
- Ambulance: East Midlands
- UK Parliament: Daventry

Pury End is a hamlet of approximately 100 houses in the civil parish of Paulerspury, near Towcester in West Northamptonshire, England. The Grafton Way footpath crosses through the village and runs down Carey's Road. The population of the parish, including Pury End, Plumpton and Paulerspury, was 1,018 in the 2011 census.

Historically, the village is significant as the birthplace of the missionary William Carey (1761). The cottage of his birth no longer exists, but its site is marked by a stone memorial on Carey's Road, named after him.

During World War II, the small hamlet was hit by a stray bomb. Several houses were damaged – the Manor Farm, "Little Farm", the Bricklayers' Arms pub and the Primitive Methodist Chapel (now known as "Old Chapel Cottage").
