= William Carey University, Meghalaya =

University in Shillong, Meghalaya, India

William Carey University
- Motto: Expect Great Things From God; Attempt Great Things For God.
- Type: State Private University
- Established: 2005
- Chairman: Prof. Ken Gnanakan
- Vice-Chancellor: Dr. Anand Gupta
- Location: Shillong, Meghalaya, India; 25.571°N 91.890°E
- Website: Official website

William Carey University is situated in Shillong, Meghalaya, India. It was established under the William Carey Act 2005 (Gazette of Meghalaya No. 76) which authorized ACTS to establish the university Named in honor of the Baptist missionary William Carey, the university is dedicated primarily to higher education.
