= Greens Norton =

Village in Northamptonshire, England

Coordinates: 52.142°N 1.024°W

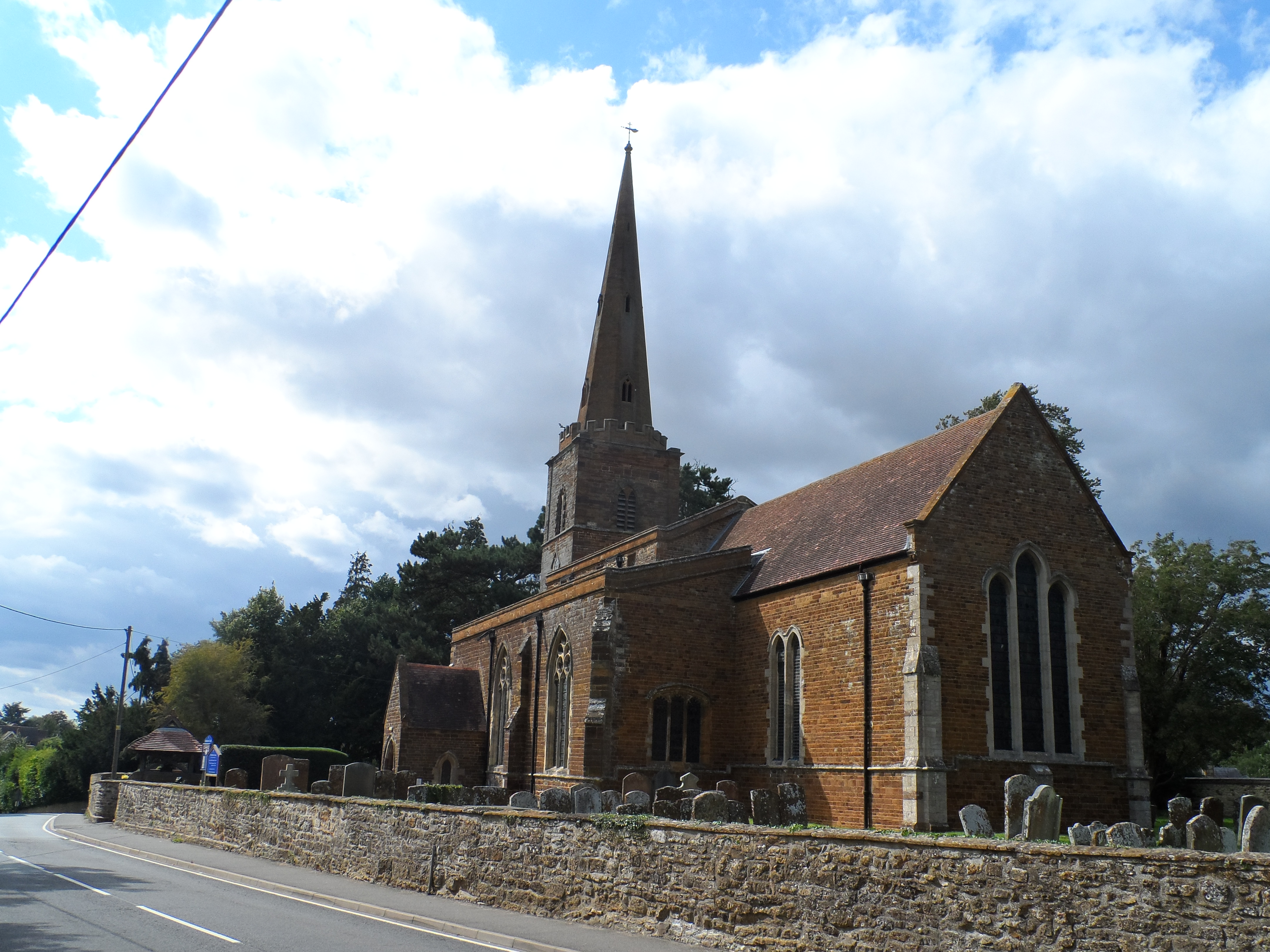
- St Bartholomew's church, Greens Norton

- Location within Northamptonshire
- Population: 1,526 (in 2011)
- OS grid reference: SP6649
- Unitary authority: West Northamptonshire
- Ceremonial county: Northamptonshire
- Region: East Midlands
- Country: England
- Sovereign state: United Kingdom
- Post town: Towcester
- Postcode district: NN12
- Dialling code: 01327
- Police: Northamptonshire
- Fire: Northamptonshire
- Ambulance: East Midlands
- UK Parliament: Daventry
- Website: www.greensnortonparishcouncil.org.uk

Greens Norton is a village and civil parish in West Northamptonshire, England, just over 1 mile (1.6 km) north-west of Towcester. At the 2011 census the parish, including Caswell and Duncote, had a population of 1,526, a slight decrease since the 2001 census.

== History ==
Located on Watling Street, in medieval times the village was known as simply 'Norton' and was a royal domain of Edward the Confessor and later William the Conqueror. In the 14th century the whole village was sold to Sir Henry de Grene for a total of 20 shillings, hence the name Grene's Norton, which today was modernized to just Greens Norton.

== Buildings ==
The Grade I listed parish church is dedicated to St Bartholomew and is Saxon in origin. Its tall spire, last rebuilt in 1957, is a landmark for miles around. The architect H. R. Gough rebuilt the chancel arch in 1882. There are monuments and a brass to members of the de Grene or Greene family. The church is in the Diocese of Peterborough, and the benefice of Towcester with Caldecote and Easton Neston and Greens Norton and Bradden (The Tove Benefice).

There are 27 listed buildings in the parish, all but the church at Grade II. Other notable buildings include Bengal Manor and nearby farms built about 1840 by the Grafton Estate at nearby Caswell and Field Burcote.

== Amenities ==
Greens Norton has a pub, a post office, a village shop, a primary school, a playground and playing field, a butcher and a doctors' surgery. The village is the northern terminus of the Grafton Way footpath, and there is a local nature reserve, Greens Norton Pocket Park. The village holds an annual village show, affiliated to the RHS, has a Neighbourhood Watch scheme, and produces a free bi-monthly village newsletter.

== Transport ==
Although there was never a railway station at Greens Norton, there was once a junction here, where the lines of the Stratford and Midland Junction Railway from Towcester to Stratford, and Towcester to Banbury diverged. In 1910 however, the physical connection was removed, leaving two separate single lines running side by side from here into Towcester.
