= Krishna Pal =

First Indian convert to Baptist Christianity

- কৃষ্ণ পাল
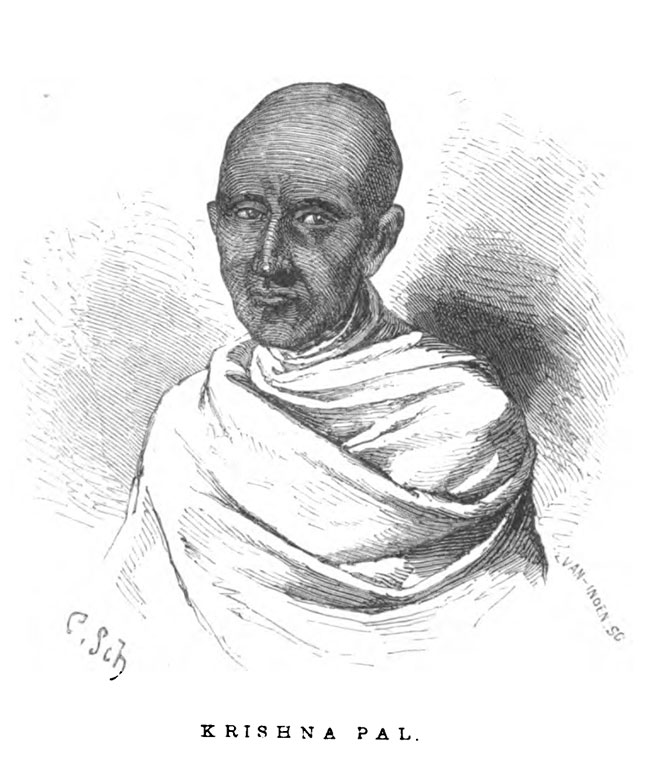
- Born: 1764; Calcutta, India
- Died: 1822
- Religion: Baptist Christianity
- Ordained: 1804

Krishna Pal (Bengali: কৃষ্ণ পাল; 1764–1822) was the first Indian convert to Baptist Christianity, through the missionary activity the Baptist Missionary Society.

== Biography ==
Pal was born in 1764 in Calcutta, India. In 1800, at the age of thirty six, he dislocated his arm while doing carpentry work. He went to the missionary-doctor John Thomas, the first missionary to India from the Baptist Missionary Society, who told Krishna Pal, with the help of Joshua Marshman, of a "disease" they said was even more deadly—sin. Pal was very moved by the story of God's salvation and was baptised by William Carey in the River Ganges a month later, in December 1800, making him the first Bengali convert to Christianity. He renounced his caste at around the same time while he was eating in public with missionaries.

He was ordained in 1804 and, until his death of cholera in 1822, Pal devoted himself to the ministry of the people in Calcutta and built a church there. In these twenty years he wrote hymns such as "The Shipwrecked Sinner Looking to Jesus," "O Thou, My Soul, Forget No More," and "Salvation by the Death of Christ," some translated from Bengali to English by Joshua Marshman.

== Works ==
- The First Hindoo Convert: A Memoir of Krishna Pal, a Preacher of the Gospel to His Countrymen More Than Twenty Years. Philadelphia: American Baptist Publication Society. 1852. OCLC 14560551.
