= Greens Norton Pocket Park =

Nature reserve in Northamptonshire, England

Coordinates: 52.137°N 1.031°W

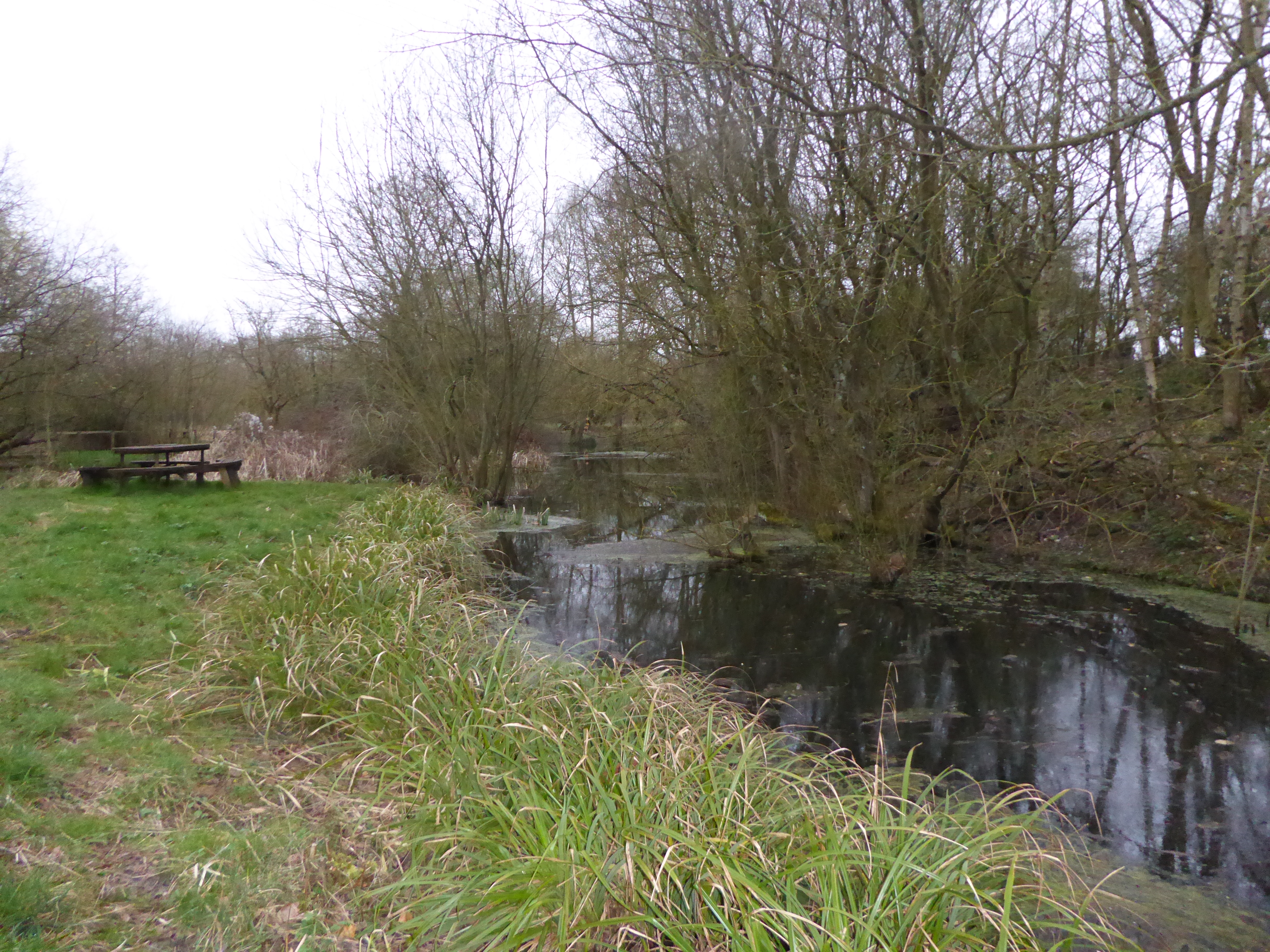
- Interactive map of Greens Norton Pocket Park
- Type: Local Nature Reserve
- Location: Greens Norton, Northamptonshire
- OS grid: SP 664 492
- Area: 2.0 hectares (4.9 acres)
- Manager: Greens Norton Parish Council

Greens Norton Pocket Park is a 2-hectare (4.9-acre) Local Nature Reserve in Greens Norton in Northamptonshire. It is owned and managed by Green Norton Parish Council.

This former brick pit has a pond, wetland, grassland and woods. There are picnic tables and benches. Fauna include barn owls, grass snakes, great crested newts and green woodpeckers.

There is access by a bridleway from Bengal Lane and a footpath from Bury Hill.
