= Duncote =

Hamlet in Northamptonshire, England

Coordinates: 52.1506°N 1.0171°W

- Location within Northamptonshire
- OS grid reference: SP6750
- Unitary authority: West Northamptonshire
- Ceremonial county: Northamptonshire
- Region: East Midlands
- Country: England
- Sovereign state: United Kingdom
- Post town: Towcester
- Postcode district: NN12
- Dialling code: 01327
- Police: Northamptonshire
- Fire: Northamptonshire
- Ambulance: East Midlands
- UK Parliament: Daventry

Duncote is a hamlet in the civil parish of Greens Norton in West Northamptonshire, England. The hamlet is 2 miles (3.2 km) North west of Towcester.

Duncote is not recorded in the Domesday Book, the name of the hamlet first appears in documentation from 1276 as Dunna's Cot. Duncote Hall is now a care home.
