= Grafton Way (footpath) =

Footpath in Northamptonshire, England

Coordinates: 52.0755°N 0.8482°W

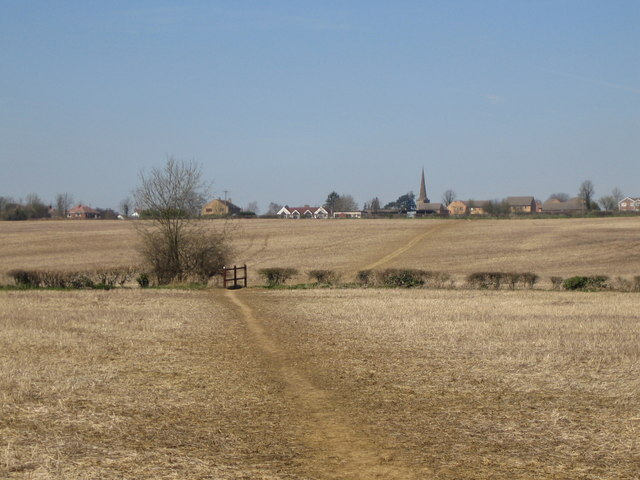
The Grafton Way approaching Greens Norton

The Grafton Way is a 13-mile (21 km) (also measured at 11.5 miles or 18.5 kilometres) footpath in Northamptonshire, England. It runs south east from Greens Norton to Cosgrove (or Wolverton), where it meets the Knightley Way. It is named after the Dukes of Grafton, major land-owners in the area in the 18th and 19th centuries.

It is recognised by the Long Distance Walkers Association and is marked on Ordnance Survey maps.

The walk starts in the centre of Greens Norton, and heads south east, skirting the south-west edge of Towcester. It passes through the hamlet of Pury End near Paulerspury, and crosses the A5 road (the ancient Watling Street) before passing the south-west of Yardley Gobion and the deserted village of Furtho to reach Cosgrove on the Grand Union Canal. Some descriptions of the walk stop here, others continue along the canal tow-path to Old Wolverton on the outskirts of Milton Keynes.
