= Moreshwar Ramachandra Walambe =

Moreshwar Ramachandra Walimbe (Devanagari: मोरेश्वर रामचंद्र वाळंबे or मो.रा. वाळंबे; 30 June 1912 – 21 March 1992) was an educator and a grammarian of the Marathi language. He wrote style guides and textbooks on the grammar of Marathi.

== Early life and education ==
Walambe was born at Ramadurg in the state of Karnataka, India. After completing his primary education at Mudhol, he obtained his Bachelor of Arts degree from Rajaram College, Kolhapur. He served in various capacities as a school teacher, educator and editor of textbooks at several educational institutions in Maharashtra, including a fifteen-year stint at the New English School in Satara and another of equal length at the New English School in Pune. He was also instrumental in the compilation of Marathi dictionaries for Tilak Smarak Mandir, Pune.

== Career ==
Walambe's interest and command of the rules governing the stylistic aspects of written Marathi led him to work as a proofreader for Marathi publishing houses, and as a pro bono consultant for printing presses. His treatise 'सुगम मराठी व्याकरण व लेखन' has become a standard reference in this area.

Walambe was an avid reader of Marathi literature. He nurtured close personal friendships with several prominent Marathi writers, such as V.S. Khandekar, G. D. Madgular, N. S. Phadke and Malati Bedekar. He served as the Secretary of the Marathi Sahitya Parishad as well as the Vasant Vyakhyanmala for many years, and maintained a prolonged association with the Marathi Granthalaya Parishad.

== Works ==
- आंग्ल भाषेचे अलंकार (Figures of speech in the English language)
- डॉ. बाळकृष्ण यांचे चरित्र (A biography of Dr Balakrishna)
- वनराणी एल्सा (A translation of Joy Adamson's book Born Free)
- शिकारीच्या सत्यकथा (An account of Walambe's own experiences with hunting)
- सुबोध वाचन: भाग १, २, ३
- शुद्धलेखन प्रदीप (A style guide for Marathi writing)
- सुगम मराठी व्याकरण व लेखन (A school textbook on Marathi grammar)
- Marāṭhī Śud'dhalēkhana Pradīpa मराठी शुद्धलेखन प्रदीप [Marathi Orthography]. Pune: Nitin. March 1986.

Apart from these, Walambe was also a regular contributor of scholarly articles to many periodicals such as स्त्री, किर्लोस्कर, मनोहर and केसरी.
